= List of Religious Cultural Monuments of Albania =

The List of Religious Cultural Monuments of Albania (Albanian: Objekte fetare me statusin Monument Kulture) refers to a monument in Albania which has been recognized by the Government of Albania and Ministry of Culture as a religious national heritage monument and one which is seen as of top importance to the religious culture of the nation. These cultural monuments include places of worship, including mosques, churches and monasteries. As of 2010, there were 201 places of worship that have been designated as Religious Cultural Monuments.

== List of places of worship designated as Religious Cultural Monuments of Albania ==
=== Berat County ===
| Name | Location |
|---|---|
| Dormition Cathedral | Berat |
| Holy Trinity Church | Berat |
| St. Michael's Church | Berat |
| St. Mary of Blachernae's Church | Berat |
| St. Theodore's Church | Berat |
| King Mosque | Berat |
| Red Mosque | Berat |
| White Mosque | Berat |
| Bachelors' Mosque | Berat |
| Lead Mosque | Berat |
| Hysen Pasha Mosque | Berat |
| Telelka Mosque | Berat |
| Halveti Teqe | Berat |
| Rüfai Teqe | Berat |
| Annunciation Church | Kozarë |
| St. Demetrius' Church | Drobonik |
| St. Mary's Church | Mbreshtan |
| St. Nicholas' Church | Perondi |
| St. Demetrius' Church | Poliçan |

=== Dibër County ===
| Name | Location |
|---|---|
| Allajbegi's Mosque | Burim |
| Kuvend of Dukagjin | Dukagjin |
| Halveti Teqe | Herebel |
| St. Saviour's Church | Herebel |
| St. Saviour's Church | Kërçisht |
| Teqe of Martanesh | Martanesh |

=== Durrës County ===
| Name | Location |
|---|---|
| Gjuricë Church | Durrës |
| Fatih Mosque | Durrës |
| St. Michael Basilica | Arapaj |
| St. Anthony Church | Cape of Rodon |
| Bazaar Mosque | Krujë |
| Church ruins | Krujë |
| Teqe of Dollme | Krujë |
| St. Mary's Church | Shën Mëri |

=== Elbasan County ===
| Name | Location |
|---|---|
| Basilica on Tepe's Hill | Elbasan |
| King Mosque | Elbasan |
| Namazgah | Elbasan |
| Naziresha Mosque | Elbasan |
| St. Mary's Church | Elbasan |
| Church ruins, Belsh | Belsh |
| Church ruins, Bixëllenjë | Elbasan |
| Grabovë Church | Grabovë |
| Church ruins, Mamël | Mamël |
| Annunciation Church, Mjekës | Mjekës |
| Clock Mosque, Peqin | Peqin |
| Church ruins, Selvias | Selvias |
| St. Nicholas' Church | Shelcan |
| St. Jovan Vladimir's Church | Shijon |
| Qafthanë Church | Urakë |
| Qafthanë Cave Church | Urakë |
| St. Paraskevi's Church | Vallesh |

=== Fier County ===
| Name | Location |
|---|---|
| Ardenica Monastery | Ardenicë |
| Basilica of Ballsh | Ballsh |
| St. Mary's Church | Bishqethëm |
| Ancient basilicas of Byllis | Byllis |
| St. Paraskevi's Church | Hoxharë |
| St. Theodore's Church | Kadipashaj |
| St. Athanasius' Church | Karavasta |
| St. Cosmas' and St. Mary's Church | Kolkondas |
| St. Nicholas' Church | Krutje e Sipërme |
| St. Nicholas' Church | Kurjan |
| St. George's Church | Libofshë |
| St. Mary's Monastery | Pojan |
| St. George's Church | Strum |
| St. Nicholas' Church | Toshkëz |
| St. Nicholas' Church | Vanaj |

=== Gjirokastër County ===
| Name | Location |
|---|---|
| Holy Transfiguration Church | Gjirokastër |
| St. Michael's Church | Gjirokastër |
| Teqe Mosque | Gjirokastër |
| Zall Teqe | Gjirokastër |
| St. Paraskevi's Church | Përmet |
| Teqe of Frashër | Përmet |
| St. Mary's Church | Bënjë |
| St. Elijah's Church | Buhal |
| Holy Transfiguration Monastery Church | Çatistë |
| Church ruins, Dashajt | Dashaj në Stanajt |
| St. Mary's Church | Derviçan |
| St. Anne's Church | Derviçan |
| Dhuvjan Monastery | Dhuvjan |
| St. Nicholas' Church | Dhuvjan |
| St. Mary's Monastery | Goranxi |
| Paleochristian Basilica | Goricë |
| St. Paraskevi's Church | Hllomo |
| Holy Apostles' Church | Hoshtevë |
| St. Elijah's Monastery Church | Jorgucat |
| St. Mary's Monastery Church | Koshovicë |
| St. Mary's Church | Kosinë |
| St. Mary's Church | Labovë e Kryqit |
| St. Mary's Church | Leusë |
| Holy Transfiguration Monastery Church | Mingul |
| St. Michael's Church | Mingul |
| Paleochristian Monastery Church | Nepravishtë |
| St. Michael's Monastery Church | Nivan |
| St. George's Church | Nokovë |
| St. Mary's Church | Okdunan |
| Holy Trinity Monastery Church | Pepel |
| St. Mary's Church | Peshkëpi e Sipërme |
| St. Athanasius' Church | Poliçan |
| Mezhan Church | Poliçan |
| St. Nicholas' Church | Saraqinisht |
| St. Paraskevi's Church | Selckë |
| St. Athanasius' Church | Selo |
| St. Mary's Church | Seran |
| St. Mary's Church | Skore |
| Dormition Church | Sopik |
| St. Elijah's Church | Stegopull |
| St. Mary's Monastery Church | Tranoshisht |
| St. Saviour's Church | Tremishtë |
| St. Mary's Church | Vrahogoranxi |
| Annunciation Monastery | Vanistër |
| St. Mary's Church on Drianos | Zervat |
| Dormition Church | Zervat |

=== Korçë County ===
| Name | Location |
|---|---|
| Iljaz Mirahori Mosque | Korçë |
| St. John the Baptist Monastery | Moscopole |
| St. Athanasius Church | Moscopole |
| St. Michael Church | Moscopole |
| St. Nicholas Church | Moscopole |
| St. Mary's Church | Moscopole |
| St. Elijah Church | Moscopole |
| St. Demetrius' Church | Bezmisht |
| St. Mary's Cave | Bezmisht |
| St. John's Church | Boboshticë |
| St. Demetrius' Church | Boboshticë |
| St. George's Church | Dardhë |
| Holy Trinity Church | Lavdar i Oparit |
| Paleochristian Church | Lin |
| Byzantine Church | Lin |
| St. Marina's Monastery | Llëngë |
| St. Mary's Monastery Church | Lubonjë |
| Maligrad Cave Church | Maligrad |
| Holy Resurrection Church | Mborje |
| St. George's Church | Shipckë |
| St. Mary's Church | Vithkuq |
| St. Michael's Church | Vithkuq |

=== Kukës County ===
| Name | Location |
|---|---|
| Kisha e ancitit | Breg-Lum |

=== Lezhë County ===
| Name | Location |
|---|---|
| Fort Mosque | Lezhë |
| St. Nicholas' Church | Lezhë |
| St. Paraskevi's Church | Balldren |
| St. Stephen's Church | Blinisht |
| St. Alexander's Church | Bokion |
| St. Michael's Church | Menshat |
| St. Veneranda's Church | Pllanë |
| Rubik Monastery Church | Rubik |

=== Shkodër County ===
| Name | Location |
|---|---|
| Lead Mosque | Shkodër |
| Sanctuary | Shkodër |
| Drisht Castle Church | Drisht |
| St. John's Church | Linaj |
| Church ruins | Mazrek |
| Shirgj Monastery | Obot |
| St. Mark's Church | Vau i Dejës |

=== Tirana County ===
| Name | Location |
|---|---|
| Et'hem Bey Mosque | Tirana |
| Kapllan Pasha Tomb | Tirana |
| Sheh Dyrri Teqe | Tirana |
| St. Paraskevi's Church | Kavajë |
| Bride's Tomb | Mullet |
| St. Mary's Church | Surrel |
| Tirana Mosaic | Tirana |

=== Vlorë County ===
| Name | Location |
|---|---|
| Muradie Mosque | Vlorë |
| All Saints' Church | Himarë |
| St. Andrew's Church | Himarë |
| St. Mary's Church | Himarë |
| St. Sergius' and St. Bacchus' Church | Himarë |
| Hypapante Church | Dhërmi |
| Panagia Monastery Church | Dhërmi |
| St. Stephen's Church | Dhërmi |
| Mesodhia Church | Vuno |
| St. Michael's Church | Vuno |
| St. Saviour's Church | Vuno |
| St. Spyridon's Church | Vuno |
| St. Nicholas' Church | Armen |
| St. George's Church | Brataj |
| St. John the Theologian's Monastery Tower | Cerkovicë |
| Church ruins, Çiflik | Çiflik |
| Xhemahallë complex | Delvinë |
| St. John's Church | Delvinë District |
| St. George's Monastery | Demë near Sarandë |
| St. Nicholas' Monastery Church | Dhivër |
| St. Mary's Monastery Church | Dhivër |
| St. Nicholas' Church | Dhrovjan |
| Dervish Ali's Tower | Dukat |
| St. Mary's Monastery | Kakome |
| St. Mary's Monastery Church | Kameno |
| Holy Trinity Monastery Church | Kardhikaq |
| St. Mary's Monastery | Krorëz |
| St. Athanasius' Monastery Church | Leshnicë e Poshtme |
| St. George's Church | Leshnicë e Sipërme |
| Ancient temple | Livadhja |
| St. Mary's Church | Melçan |
| St. Nicholas' Monastery Church | Mesopotam |
| Ancient temple | Metoq |
| Kamenicë Church | Palavli |
| Marmiroi church | Pashaliman |
| St. Athanasius' Church | Pecë |
| St. Mary's Monastery Church | Piqeras |
| St. Demetrius' Monastery Church | Qeparo |
| Gjin Aleksi's Mosque | Rusan |
| Forty Saints Monastery | Sarandë |
| St. Athanasius' Church | Sopik |
| St. Marina's Cave | Vagalat |
| St. Mary's Monastery | Zvërnec |

== See also ==
- List of Bektashi tekkes and shrines
- List of tekkes in Albania
