= St. Paraskevi Church =

Church of St. Paraskevi or St. Paraskevi Church may refer to:

- Church of St. Paraskevi, Novgorod, a church in Veliky Novgorod, one of Russia's oldest
- Church of St. Paraskevi (Përmet), a church in Përmet, Gjirokastër County, Albania
- Church of Saint Paraskevi, Nesebar, a medieval Eastern Orthodox church in Nesebar, Bulgaria
- St. Paraskevi's Church, Balldren, a church in Balldren, Lezhë County, Albania
- St. Paraskevi's Church, Çetë, a church in Çetë, Kavajë Municipality, Albania
- St. Paraskevi's Church, Hllomo, a church in Hllomo, Gjirokastër County, Albania
- St. Paraskevi's Church, Hoxharë, a 13th-century church in Hoxharë, Fier County, Albania
- St. Paraskevi Church, Kwiatoń, a Gothic, wooden church located in Kwiatoń, Poland
- St. Paraskevi Church, Radruż, a Gothic, wooden church located in Radruż, Poland
- St. Paraskevi's Church, Selckë, a church in Selckë, Gjirokastër County, Albania
- St. Paraskevi's Church, Vallesh, a church in Valësh, Elbasan County, Albania
