= St. Mary's Monastery Church =

St. Mary's Monastery Church may be:

- St. Mary's Monastery Church, Dhivër, Albania
- St. Mary's Monastery Church, Tranoshisht, Albania
- St. Mary's Monastery Church, Lubonjë, Albania
- St. Mary's Monastery Church, Piqeras, Albania
- St. Mary's Monastery Church, Koshovicë, Albania
- St. Mary of the Angels Church and Monastery, Green Bay, Wisconsin

== See also ==
- St. Mary's Church (disambiguation)
- St. Mary's Monastery (disambiguation)
