= Divri =

Divri (Greek: Δίβρη) may refer to:

- Divri, Phthiotis, a village in the municipality of Lamia, Phthiotis, Greece
- the former name for Lampeia, northeastern Elis, Greece
- the Greek name for Dhivër, Sarandë District, Albania
- the Greek name for Debar, western Macedonia
