= St. Alexander's Church =

St. Alexander's Church may refer to:

- St. Alexander's Church, Bokion, Albania
- Alexander Nevsky Church, Copenhagen, Denmark
- St. Alexander Nevsky Church, Riga, Latvia
- St. Alexander Nevsky Church, Vilnius, Lithuania
- St. Alexander's Church, Warsaw, Poland

== See also ==
- Alexander Nevsky Cathedral (disambiguation)
- Co-Cathedral of St. Alexander, Kyiv
