= Hoxhara wetland =

Former wetland in Albania

Coordinates: 40°46′00″N 19°29′00″E

The Hoxhara wetland (Albanian: Këneta e Hoxharës) was a former wetland in the south of the western Lowlands of Albania, close to the village of Hoxharë.

The wetland was artificially drained in 1962. As a result, 7000ha of land could be used for agriculture and additional 12,000ha had improvement in the soil quality. On the other hand, there was a negative impact on the ecologic balance with many local flora and fauna species being destroyed or going extinct.
