= St. Veneranda's Church =

Cultural monument of Albania

- Kisha e Shën Venerandës (Albanian)
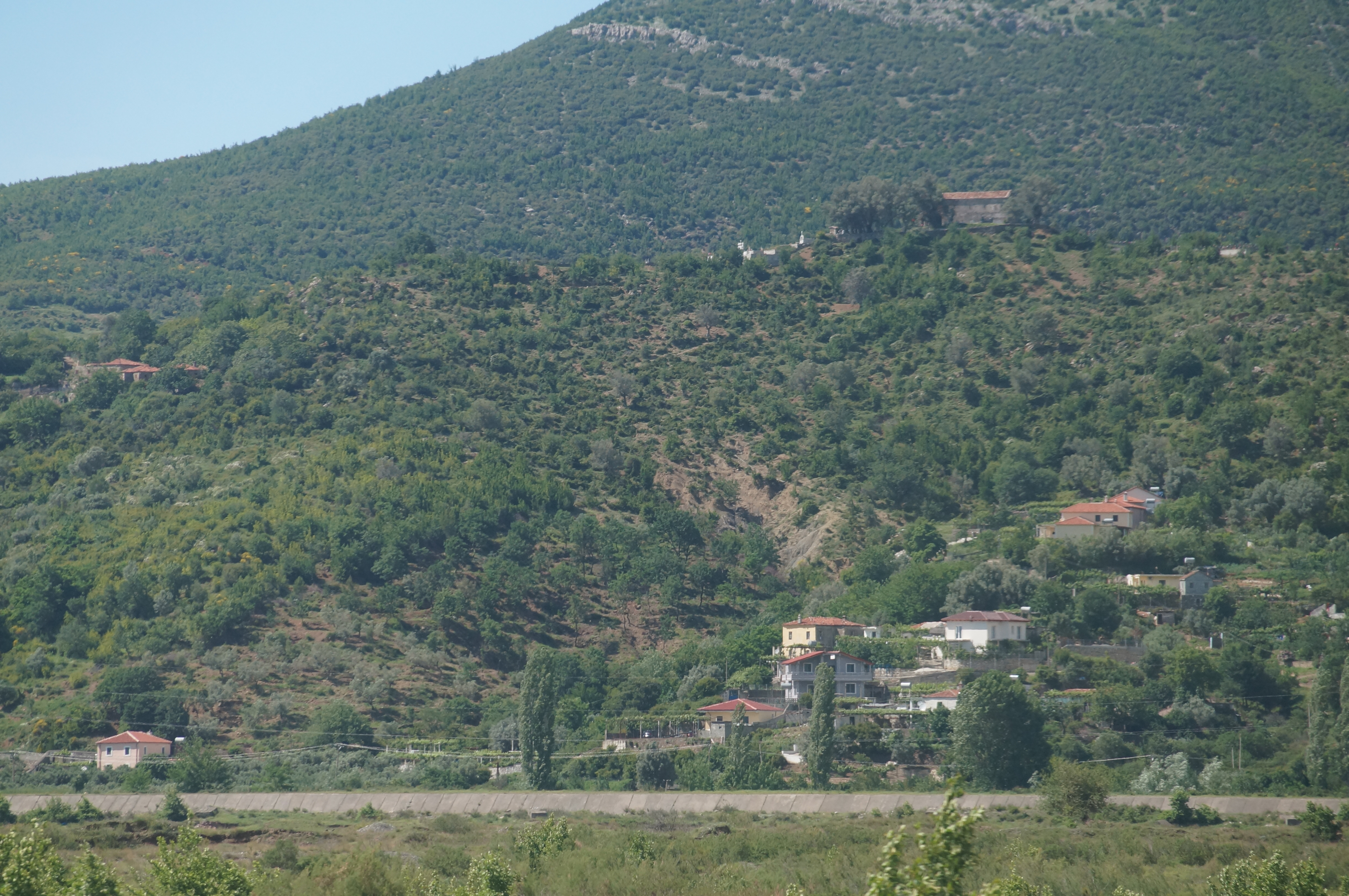
- Interactive map of St. Veneranda's Church
- 41.7036°N 19.7129°E
- Location: Pllanë

Cultural Monument of Albania

St. Veneranda's Church (Albanian: Kisha e Shën Venerandës) is a Cultural Monument of Albania, located near Pllanë, Lezhë County. It was designated as a Cultural Monument in 1963.
