= Hysen Pasha Mosque =

Mosque in Berat, Albania

- Xhamia e Hysen Pashës
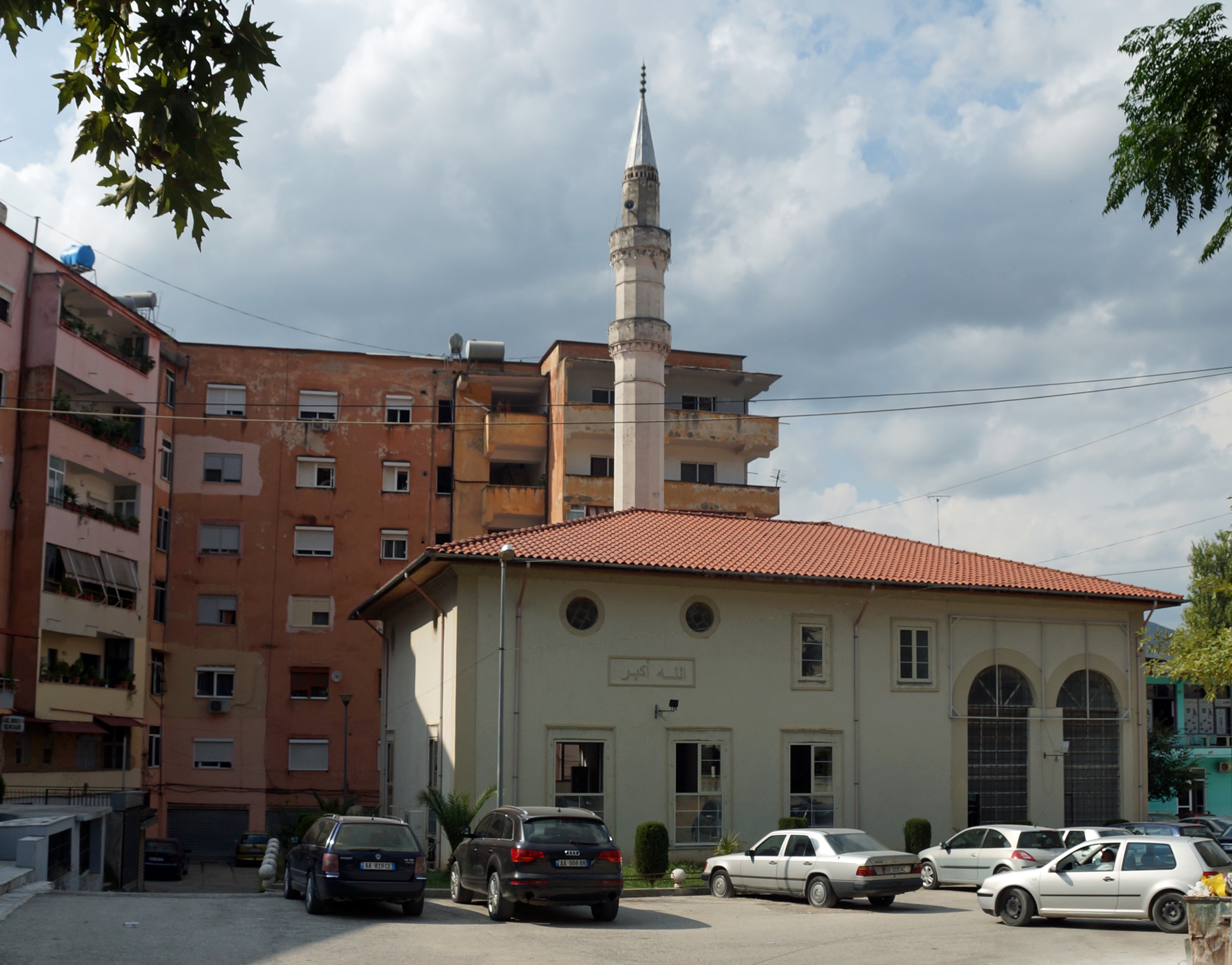
- The mosque and its minaret in 2015

- Location of the mosque in Albania

Religion
- Affiliation: Islam
- Ecclesiastical or organizational status: Mosque: (1670–c. 1960s); (since c. 1991– )
- Status: Active

Location
- Location: Berat
- Country: Albania
- Interactive map of Hysen Pasha Mosque
- Coordinates: 40°42′22″N 19°56′25″E

Architecture
- Type: Islamic architecture
- Style: Ottoman
- Founder: Hussein Pasha
- Completed: 1670 CE
- Minaret: 1

Cultural Monument of Albania
- Official name: Hysen Pasha Mosque
- Part of: Historic Centres of Berat and Gjirokastra

UNESCO World Heritage Site
- Official name: Historic Centres of Berat and Gjirokastër
- Criteria: Cultural: iii, iv
- Reference: 569
- Inscription: 2005 (29th Session)
- Extensions: 2008

The Hysen Pasha Mosque (Albanian: Xhamia e Hysen Pashës), also known as the Clock Mosque (Xhamia e Sahatit), is a mosque, located in Berat, Albania. Completed in 1670, partially destroyed in c. 1967, and renovated in c. 1991, the mosque was designated as a Cultural Monument of Albania; and forms part of the Historic Centres of Berat and Gjirokastër, a UNESCO World Heritage Site that was designated in 2005.

== Overview ==
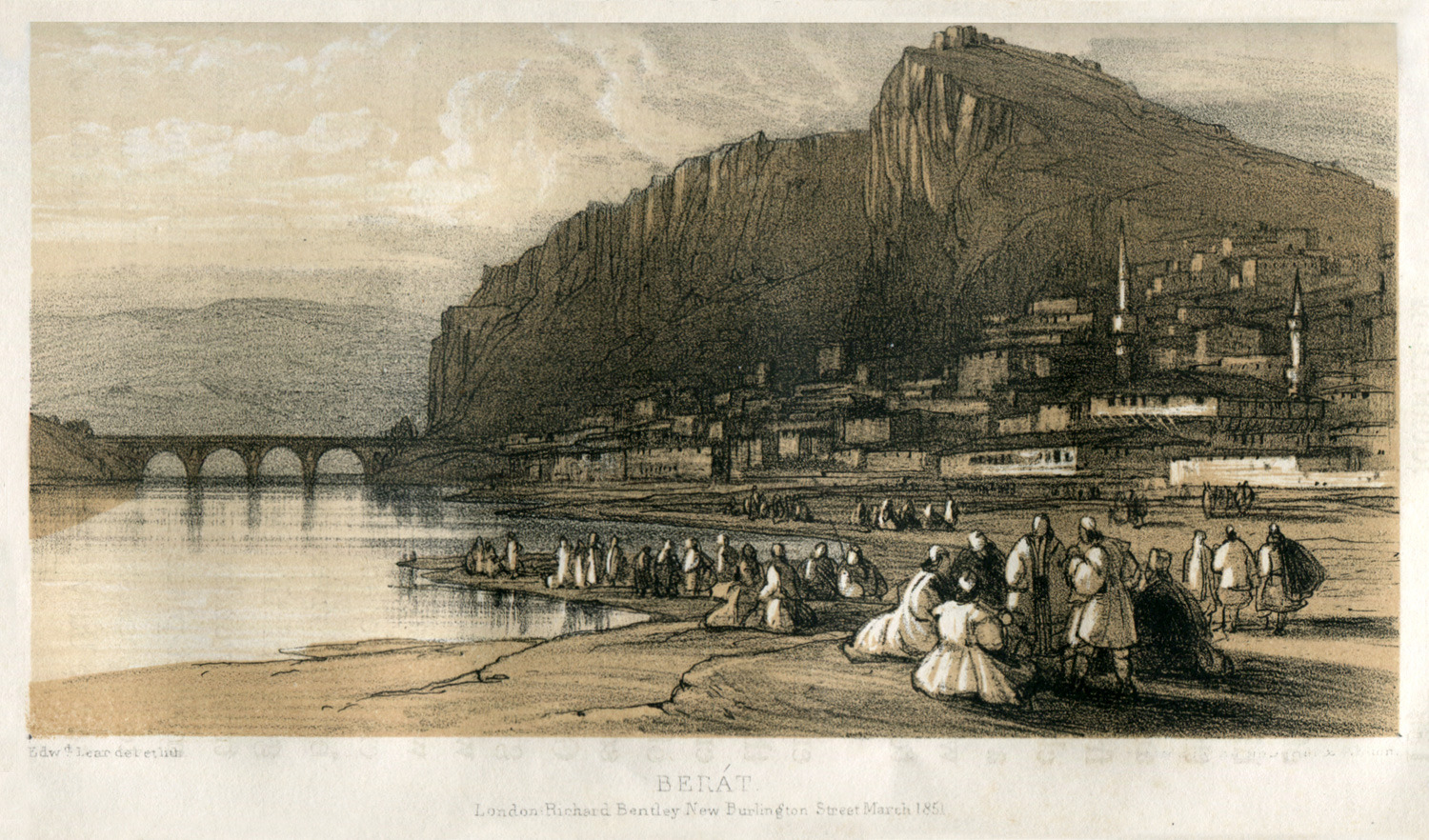
The mosque with its two minaret sherefes (right) in 1851 by Edward Lear

It was built in 1670 CE by Hussein Pasha. It was named Clock Mosque because in 1870 the Ottomans built a clock tower next to it. The clock tower was destroyed during the Communist dictatorship of Enver Hoxha in 1967. The mosque was also destroyed with the minaret being the only part left over. After the end of Communism the mosque was renovated.

== See also ==
- Islam in Albania
- List of mosques in Albania
- List of Religious Cultural Monuments of Albania
