= White Mosque, Berat =

Former mosque in Berat, Albania

White Mosque
- Xhamia e Bardhë
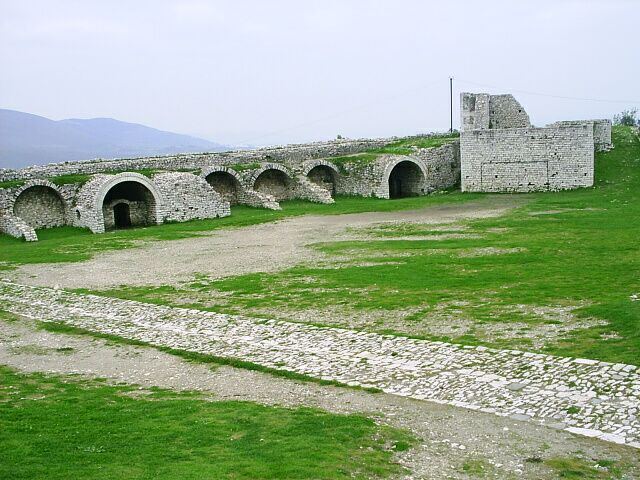
- The former mosque in 2012

- Location of the former mosque in Albania

Religion
- Affiliation: Islam (former)
- Ecclesiastical or organizational status: Mosque (1417–19th century)
- Status: Destroyed (partial ruinous state)

Location
- Location: Berat Castle, Berat
- Country: Albania
- Interactive map of White Mosque
- Coordinates: 40°42′29″N 19°56′43″E

Architecture
- Completed: 1417 CE
- Destroyed: 19th century

Specifications
- Minaret: 1 (since destroyed)
- Materials: Limestone

Cultural Monument of Albania
- Official name: White Mosque
- Designated: 1961
- Part of: Historic Centres of Berat and Gjirokastër
- Reference no.: BR459

UNESCO World Heritage Site
- Official name: Historic Centres of Berat and Gjirokastër
- Criteria: Cultural: iii, iv
- Reference: 569
- Inscription: 2005 (29th Session)
- Extensions: 2008

The White Mosque (Albanian: Xhamia e Bardhë or Ak Mesxhid), also known as the Sultan Bayezid II Mosque, is a ruined mosque in Berat Castle, Berat, Albania. The former mosque was designated as a Cultural Monument of Albania in 1961; and forms part of the Historic Centres of Berat and Gjirokastër, a UNESCO World Heritage Site that was designated in 2005.

== Overview ==
From the small, roughly square mosque there are still about 1-metre-high (3.3 ft) foundation walls and the base of the minaret, that is a little over 2 metres (6 ft 7 in) high. It was built with white limestone in 1417, and was destroyed sometime in the 19th century after a local uprising against the Ottoman Empire's Tanzimat reforms, but was left untended after 1967 under Enver Hoxha's atheistic regime.

== See also ==
- Islam in Albania
- List of mosques in Albania
- List of Religious Cultural Monuments of Albania
