= Teqe Mosque =

Former mosque in Gjirokastër, Albania

- Xhamia e Teqes
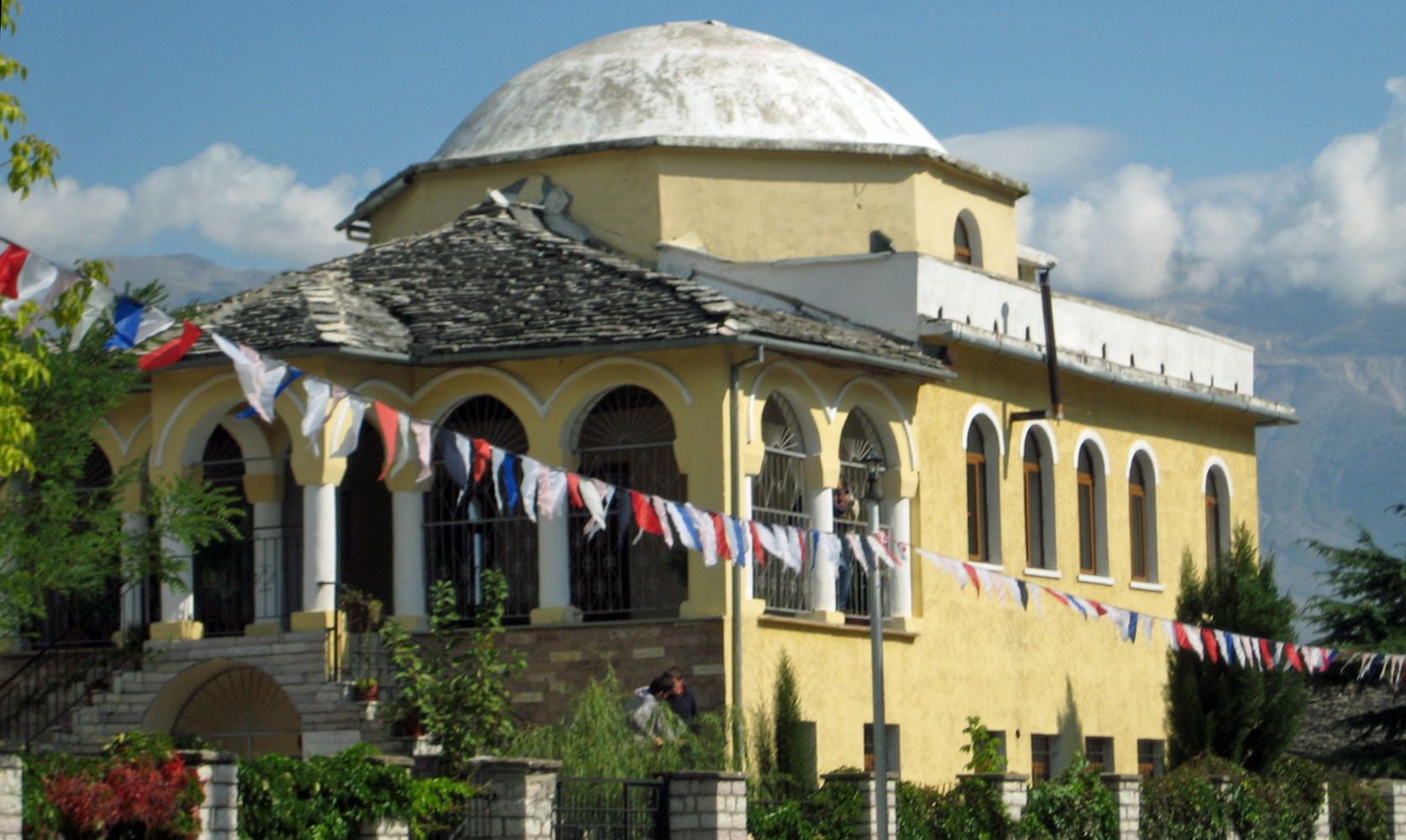
- The former mosque in 2008

- Location of the former mosque in Albania

Religion
- Affiliation: Islam (former)
- Ecclesiastical or organizational status: Mosque and Madrasa; (1733–c. 1960s)
- Status: Inactive (in partial ruins)

Location
- Location: Gjirokastër
- Country: Albania
- Interactive map of Teqe Mosque
- Coordinates: 40°04′26″N 20°08′19″E

Architecture
- Architect: Ahmet Çelebi
- Type: Islamic architecture
- Style: Ottoman
- Completed: 17th century; (first structure); 1145 AH (1732/1733 CE); (current structure)

Specifications
- Dome: 1
- Minaret: 1

Cultural Monument of Albania
- Official name: Teqe Mosque
- Criteria: I
- Designated: 10 June 1973
- Part of: Historic Centres of Berat and Gjirokastër
- Reference no.: GJ157

UNESCO World Heritage Site
- Official name: Historic Centres of Berat and Gjirokastër
- Criteria: Cultural: iii, iv
- Reference: 569
- Inscription: 2005 (29th Session)
- Extensions: 2008

The Teqe Mosque (Note: Also spelled as Tekke.) (Albanian: Xhamia e Teqes) is a former mosque and madrasa, located in Gjirokastër, Albania. The former mosque was designated as a Cultural Monument of Albania in 1973; and forms part of the Historic Centres of Berat and Gjirokastër, a UNESCO World Heritage Site that was designated in 2005.

== Overview ==
It was described by explorer Evliya Çelebi in the 17th century, but its current form was designed by Ahmet Çelebi in 1773. An inscription dates it from 1145 AH (1732/1733 CE). Though named Teqe by its first descriptor, the locals call it Mesh Mosque. Still standing in 1967 and originally slated for demolition soon after, it was reprieved with cultural monument status in 1973.

== Gallery ==
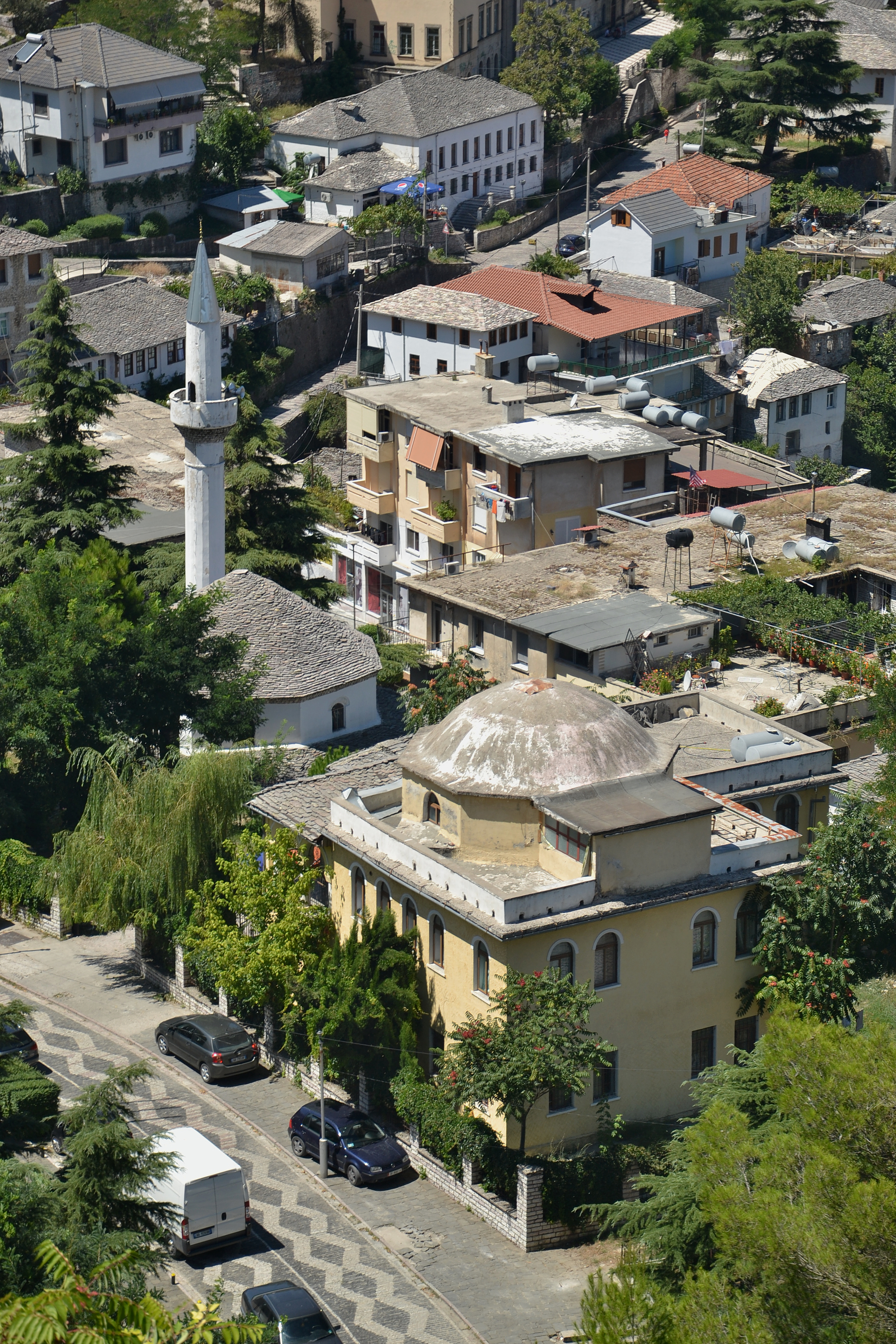
Aerial view of the former mosque

== See also ==
- Islam in Albania
- List of mosques in Albania
- List of Religious Cultural Monuments of Albania
