= Kamenicë Church =

Cultural Monument in Albania

- Rrënojat e Kishës së Kamenicës (Albanian)
- Location within Albania
- 39.98°N 20.04°E
- Location: Palavli

Cultural Monument of Albania

Kamenicë Church (Albanian: Rrënojat e Kishës së Kamenicës) is a ruined church in Palavli, Delvinë, Albania. It is a Cultural Monument of Albania.
