= St. Mary's Church, Melçan =

Cultural monument in Albania

St. Mary's Church
- Kisha e Shën Mërisë (Albanian)
- Interactive map of St. Mary's Church
- 39.8156°N 20.2296°E
- Location: Melçan

Cultural Monument of Albania

St. Mary's Church (Albanian: Kisha e Shën Mërisë) is a church in Melçan, Vlorë County, Albania. It is a Cultural Monument of Albania.
