= Rüfai Tekke, Berat =

Tekke in Berat, Albania

Rüfai Tekke
- Teqeja e Rufaive
- Location of the tekke in Albania

Religion
- Affiliation: Sunni Islam
- Sect: Sufism
- Rite: Rüfai
- Ecclesiastical or organizational status: Tekke
- Status: Active

Location
- Location: Berat
- Country: Albania
- Interactive map of Rüfai Tekke
- Coordinates: 40°42′21″N 19°57′09″E

Architecture
- Type: Islamic architecture
- Style: Ottoman
- Completed: 18th century

Cultural Monument of Albania
- Official name: Rüfai Tekke

The Rufai Tekke (Albanian: Teqeja e Ryfaive), also known as the Sheikh Riza Tekke (Turkish: Şeyh Rıza Tekkesi) is a tekke, located in Berat, Albania. The tekke was built in the 18th century by Ahmet Kurt Pasha and pertained to the Rüfai, a Sufi order. It was designated as a Cultural Monument of Albania.

== See also ==
- Islam in Albania
- List of Religious Cultural Monuments of Albania
