= St. Nicholas' Monastery Church, Dhivër =

Cultural monument of Albania

St. Nicholas' Monastery Church
- Kisha e Manastirit të Shën Kollit (Albanian)
- Interactive map of St. Nicholas' Monastery Church
- 39.8311°N 20.1815°E
- Location: Dhivër, Vlorë County

Cultural Monument of Albania

St. Nicholas' Monastery Church (Albanian: Kisha e Manastirit të Shën Kollit) is a monastery church in Dhivër, Vlorë County, Albania. It is a Cultural Monument of Albania.
