= St. Athanasius' Monastery Church, Leshnicë e Poshtme =

Cultural monument of Albania

St. Athanasius' Monastery Church
- Kisha e Manastirit të Shën Thanasit (Albanian); Ιερά Μονή Αγίου Αθανασίου (Γερμανού) (Greek)
- Location: Leshnicë e Poshtme

Cultural Monument of Albania

St. Athanasius' Monastery Church (Greek: Ιερά Μονή Αγίου Αθανασίου (Γερμανού), Albanian: Kisha e Manastirit të Shën Thanasit, ) is a monastery church in Leshnicë e Poshtme, Vlorë County, Albania. It is a Cultural Monument of Albania.
