= St. Elijah's Church, Buhal =

Cultural monument of Albania

St. Elijah's Church
- Kisha e Shën Dëllisë (Albanian)
- Interactive map of St. Elijah's Church
- 40.2570°N 20.3145°E
- Location: Buhal

Cultural Monument of Albania

St. Elijah's Church (Albanian: Kisha e Shën Dëllisë) is a church in Buhal, Gjirokastër County, Albania. It is a Cultural Monument of Albania.
