= Cave Church, Qafthanë =

Historic site in Urakë, Albania

Qafthanë Cave Church
- Kisha në shpellën e Qafthanës (Albanian)
- Location: Urakë

Cultural Monument of Albania

The Qafthanë Cave Church (Albanian: Kisha në shpellën e Qafthanës) is a cave church near Urakë, Elbasan County, Albania. It is a Cultural Monument of Albania.
