= St. Mary's Church, Mbreshtan =

Cultural monument in Albania

St. Mary's Church
- Kisha e Shën Marisë (Albanian)
- Location: Mbreshtan

Cultural Monument of Albania

St. Mary's Church (Albanian: Kisha e Shën Marisë) is a church in Mbreshtan, a village near Berat, Albania. It became a Cultural Monument of Albania in 1948.
