= St. John's Church, Linaj =

Cultural Monument of Albania

St. John's Church
- Rrënojat e Kishës së Shën Gjinit (Albanian)
- Location: Linaj

Cultural Monument of Albania

St. John's Church (Albanian: Rrënojat e Kishës së Shën Gjinit) is a ruined church in Linaj, Shkodër County, Albania. It is a Cultural Monument of Albania.
