= Bride's Tomb =

Historic site in Mullet, Albania

- Tyrbja e Nuses (Albanian)
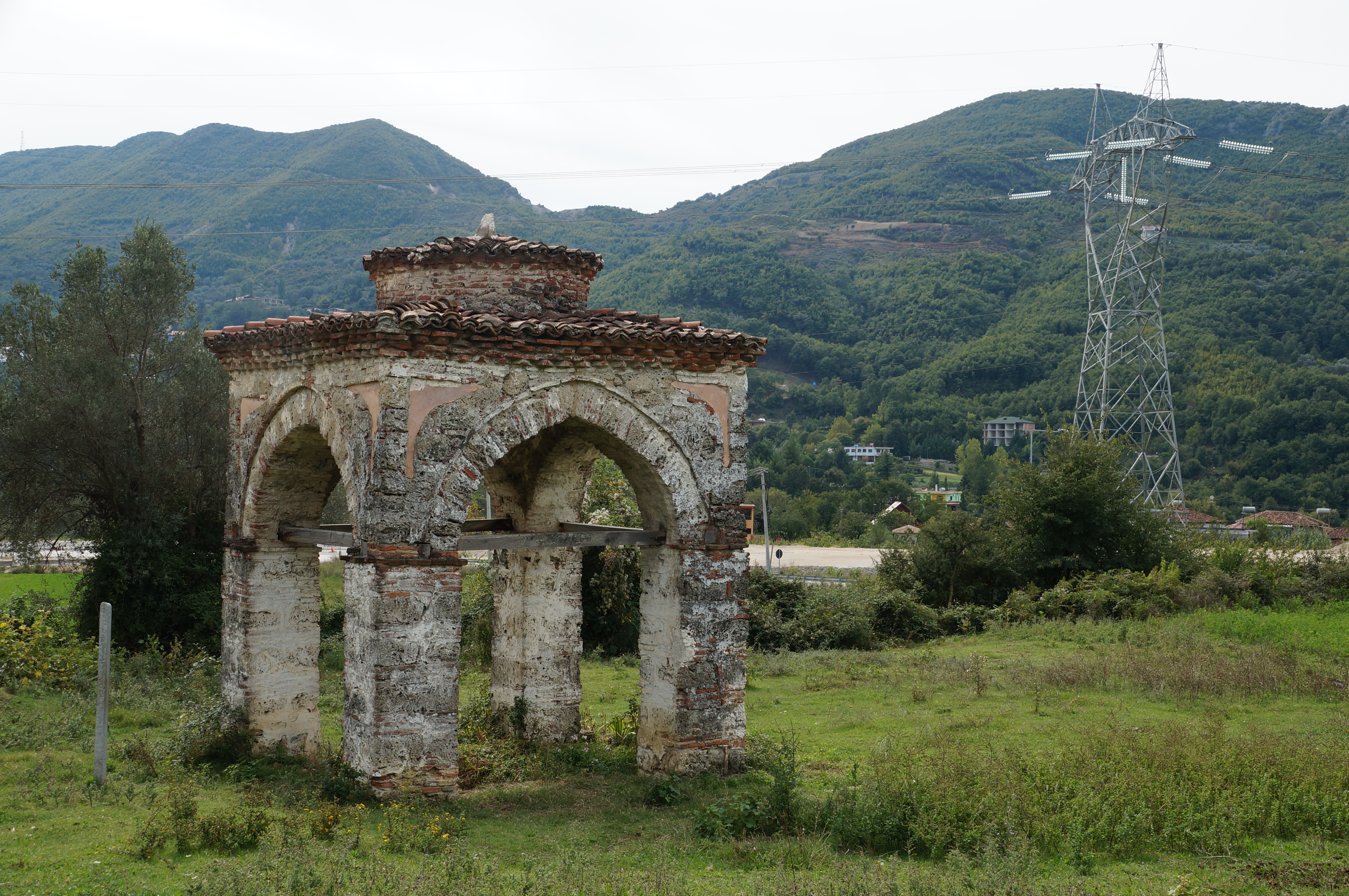
- North side of the building
- Interactive map of Bride's Tomb
- 41.2656°N 19.8718°E
- Location: Mullet

Cultural Monument of Albania

The Bride's Tomb (Albanian: Tyrbja e Nuses) is a Cultural Monument of Albania, located in Mullet, Tirana County.
