= St. John the Theologian's Monastery Tower =

Cultural monument in Albania

- Kulla e Manastirit Theollogos (Albanian)
- Interactive map of St. John the Theologian's Monastery Tower
- 39.8183°N 20.2144°E
- Location: Cerkovicë

Cultural Monument of Albania

St. John the Theologian's Monastery Tower (Albanian: Kulla e Manastirit Theollogos) is a tower, remnant of a former monastery, in Cerkovicë, Vlorë County, Albania. It is a Cultural Monument of Albania.
