= Sheh Dyrri Tekke =

Tekke in Tirana, Albania

- Teqja e Sheh Dyrrit
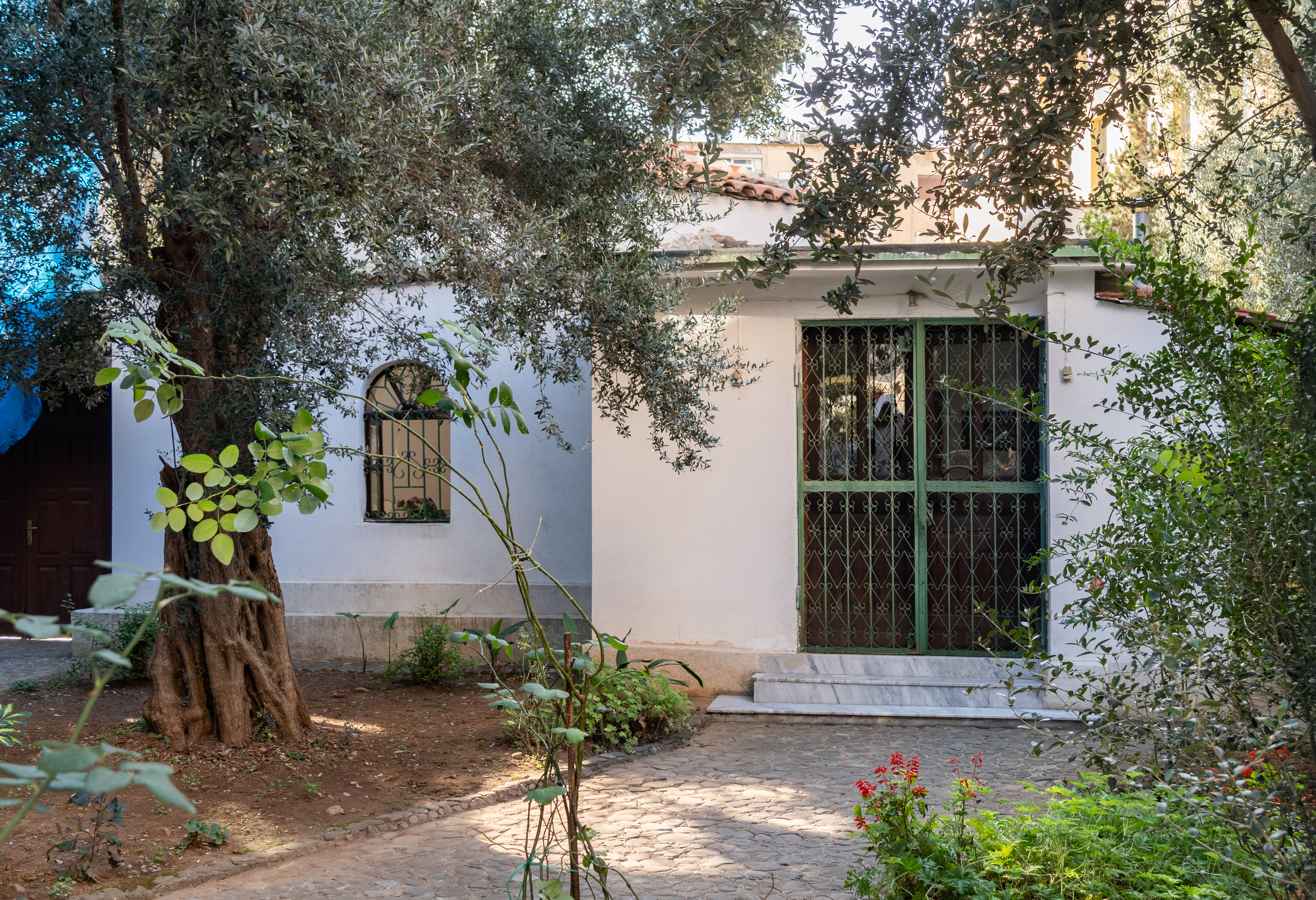
- The tekke, in 2024

- Location of the tekke in Albania

Religion
- Affiliation: Sunni Islam
- Sect: Sufism
- Rite: Qadiriyya
- Ecclesiastical or organisational status: Tekke
- Status: Active

Location
- Location: Tirana
- Country: Albania
- Interactive map of Sheh Dyrri Tekke
- Coordinates: 41°19′57″N 19°49′09″E

Architecture
- Type: Islamic architecture

Cultural Monument of Albania
- Official name: Sheh Dyrri Tekke
- Designated: 1963
- Reference no.: TR-141

The Sheikh Dyrri Tekke (Albanian: Teqja e Sheh Dyrrit) or Shaykh Duri Tekke (Turkish: Şeyh Düri Tekkesi) is a tekke, located in Tirana, Albania. The tekke was designated as a Cultural Monument of Albania in 1963. The tekke relates to the Qadiriyya, a Sufi order.

== See also ==
- Islam in Albania
- List of Religious Cultural Monuments of Albania
