= Telelka Mosque =

Former mosque in Berat, Albania

- Xhamia e Telelkave
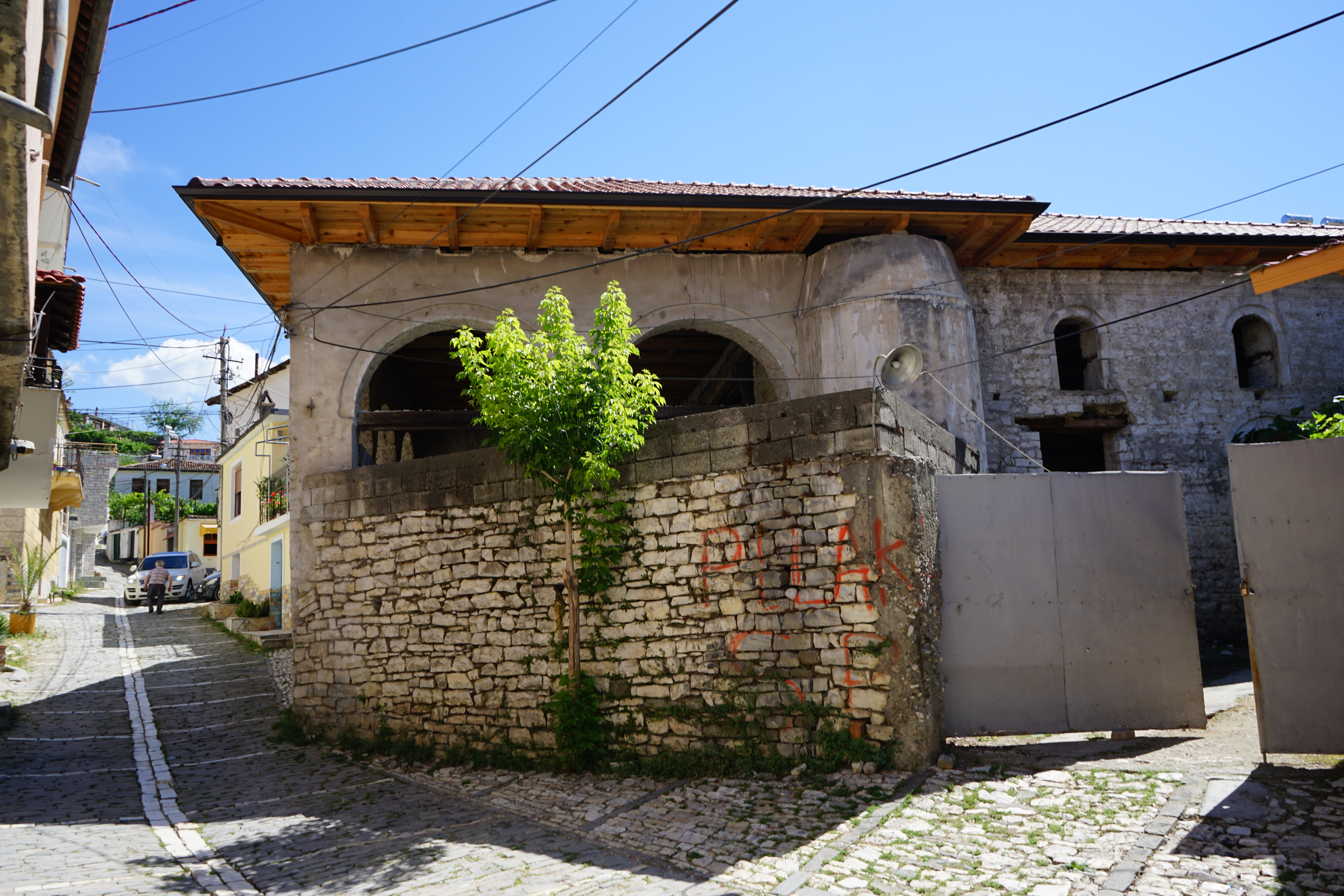
- The former mosque with the missing minaret on the right, in 2021

- Location of the former mosque in Albania

Religion
- Affiliation: Islam (former)
- Ecclesiastical or organizational status: Mosque (15th century–1967)
- Status: Inactive (as a mosque)

Location
- Location: Berat
- Country: Albania
- Interactive map of Telelka Mosque

Architecture
- Type: Islamic architecture
- Style: Ottoman
- Founder: Ibrahim Pasha Vlora
- Completed: c. 18th century
- Minaret: 1 (since destroyed)

Cultural Monument of Albania
- Official name: Ibrahim Pasha Mosque

The Telelka Mosque (Albanian: Xhamia e Telelkave), also known as the Ibrahim Pasha Mosque (Albanian: Xhamia e Ibrahim Pashës), is a former mosque, located in Berat, Albania. The former mosque was designated as a Cultural Monument of Albania.

== Overview ==
The former mosque was built by the Ottoman-era governor Ibrahim Pasha Vlora at the end of the 18th century and rebuilt in 1852. In 1967, during the communist dictatorship of Enver Hoxha, the minaret of the mosque was destroyed and the building repurposed as a wood factory. The former mosque is located exactly between the Lead and the King mosques.

The former mosque is still used as a wood workshop. The person who used it was rented out of the muftiate which belongs to the Muslim Community of Albania (KMSH).

== See also ==
- Islam in Albania
- List of mosques in Albania
- List of Religious Cultural Monuments of Albania
