= Qafthanë Church =

Cultural monument of Albania

- Kisha në Qafthanë (Albanian)
- Location: Urakë

Cultural Monument of Albania

Qafthanë Church (Albanian: Kisha në Qafthanë) is a church in Urakë, Elbasan County, Albania. It became a Cultural Monument of Albania in 1948.
