= Castle Mosque, Lezhë =

Former mosque in Lezhë, Albania

Castle Mosque
- Xhamia e Kalasë
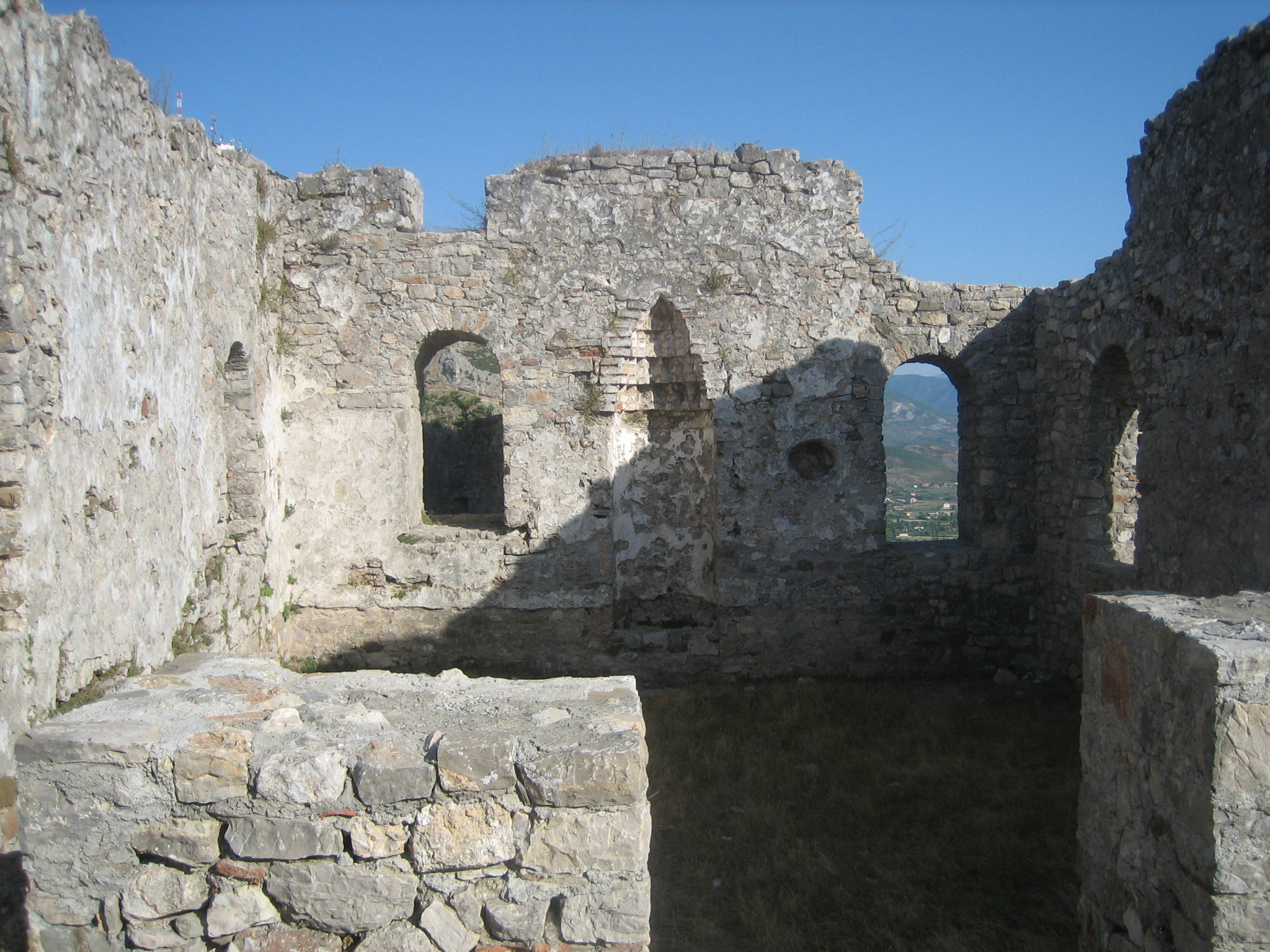
- The former mosque ruins in 2009

- Location of the former mosque in Albania

Religion
- Affiliation: Islam (former)
- Ecclesiastical or organizational status: Mosque
- Status: Inactive (in partial ruins)

Location
- Location: Lezhë
- Country: Albania
- Interactive map of Castle Mosque
- Coordinates: 41°47′02″N 19°39′00″E

Architecture
- Type: Islamic architecture

Cultural Monument of Albania
- Official name: Castle Mosque

The Castle Mosque (Albanian: Xhamia e Kalasë) is a former mosque, now in partial ruins, located in Lezhë, Albania. The former mosque was designated as a Cultural Monument of Albania.
