= St. Mary's Church, Himarë =

Cultural monument in Albania

Coordinates: 40°6′56″N 19°46′18″E

St. Mary's Church
- Kisha e Shën Mërisë së Athalit (Albanian); Ναός Παναγίας Αθαλιώτισσας (Greek)
- Interactive map of St. Mary's Church
- Location: Himarë

Cultural Monument of Albania

St. Mary's Church (Albanian: Kisha e Shën Mërisë së Athalit, Greek: Καθολικό Μονής Παναγίας Αθαλιώτισσας) is the katholikon of the monastery of Panagia (Theotokos) Athaliottisa, in Himarë, Vlorë County, Albania. It is a Cultural Monument of Albania.
