= St. Paraskevi's Church, Hoxharë =

Church in Fier County, Albania

St. Paraskevi's Church
- Kisha e Shën Premtes (Albanian)
- Location: Hoxharë, Fier County, Albania

History
- Built: 13th-century

Cultural Monument of Albania
- Designated: 1979

St. Paraskevi's Church (Albanian: Kisha e Shën Premtes) is a small 13th-century church in Hoxharë, Fier County, Albania. It became a Cultural Monument of Albania in 1979.
