= Tepe Basilica =

Cultural monument in Albania

Tepe Hill Basilica
- Bazilika në Kodrën e Tepes (Albanian)
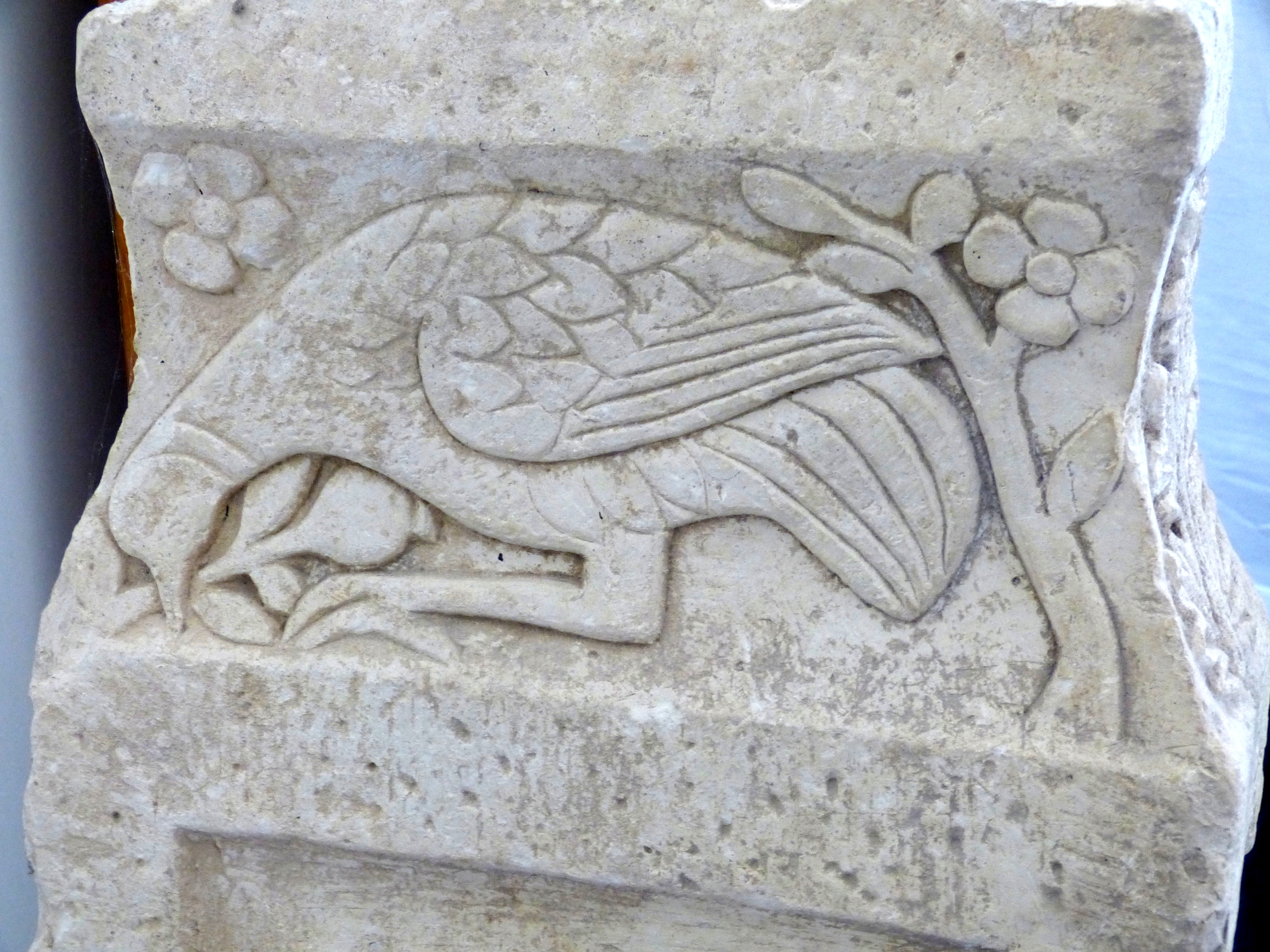
- Church fragment from Tepe in Koritza

- Location within Albania
- 41.11°N 20.07°E

Cultural Monument of Albania

The Basilica on Tepe's Hill (Albanian: Bazilika në Kodrën e Tepes, from Ottoman Turkish Tepe meaning ″hill″) is a Cultural Monument of Albania, located near Elbasan.
