= Mesodhia Church =

Cultural monument of Albania

- Kisha e Mesodhisë (Albanian)
- Location: Vuno

Cultural Monument of Albania

Mesodhia Church (Albanian: Kisha e Mesodhisë) is an Albanian Orthodox church in Vuno, Vlorë County, Albania. It is a Cultural Monument of Albania.
