= St. Paraskevi's Church, Balldren =

Cultural monument of Albania

St. Paraskevi's Church
- Kisha e Shën Premtes (Albanian)
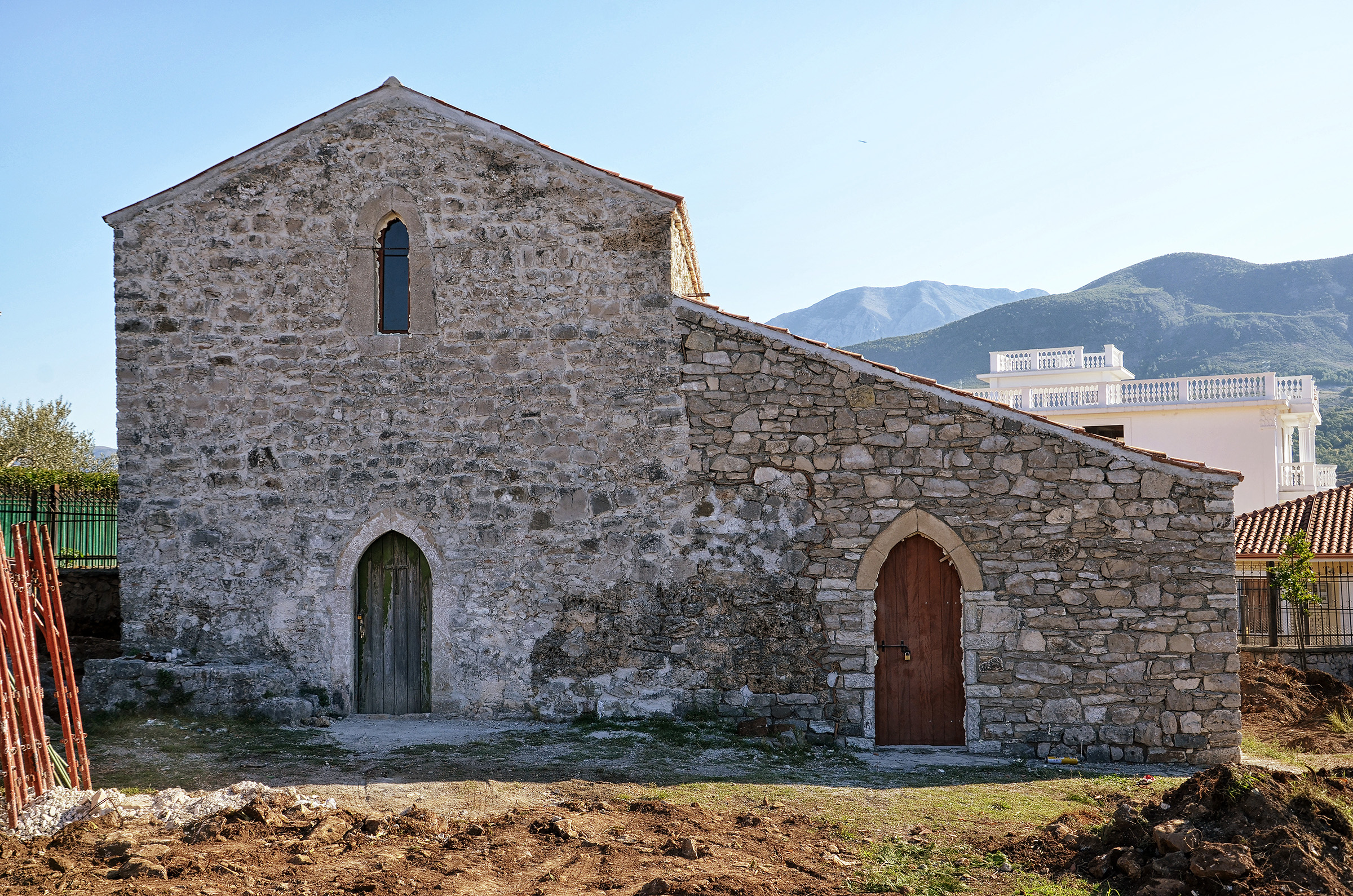
- Interactive map of St. Paraskevi's Church
- 41.8183°N 19.6403°E
- Location: Balldren

Cultural Monument of Albania

St. Paraskevi's Church (Albanian: Kisha e Shën Premtes) is a church in Balldren, Lezhë County, Albania. It became a Cultural Monument of Albania in 1984. The church was built between the XII-XIII centuries, and was renovated in 1462 according to writing found on the outer side of the church apse.
