= Leshnicë e Sipërme =

Leshnicë e Sipërme Άνω Λεσινίτσα
- Village
- Location within Albania
- Coordinates: 39.849°N 20.278°E
- Country: Albania
- County: Vlorë
- Municipality: Finiq
- Administrative unit: Dhivër
- Time zone: UTC+1 (CET)
  - Summer (DST): UTC+2 (CEST)

Leshnicë e Sipërme (Albanian definite form: Leshnica e Sipërme; Greek: Άνω Λεσινίτσα, Ano Lesinitsa) is a village in the Vlorë County in Albania near the Greek-Albanian border. At the 2015 local government reform it became part of the municipality Finiq.

== Name ==
The placename Leshnicë has several possible origins. The Bulgarian word леска, leska meaning 'hazel bush' and the suffix -ьн-иц-а, -an-its-a, with the Slavic sound change sk and y into sht and further into sh. The Bulgarian dialectal form лес, les, rendered in old Slavic as лѣсь, les meaning 'forest' and the suffix -ьн+ -иц-а, an+ -its-a, with an old Albanian sound change s into sh. The Bulgarian лешница leshnica meaning 'European bladdernut'. Or from Лес/Леш -ин, Les/Lesh -in and the suffix -иц-а, -its-a, with loss of the unemphasized i.

== Demographics ==
The village is inhabited by Greeks and the population was 502 in 1992.

== Notable people ==
- Nikos Katsalidas (Niko Kacalidha, b. 1949), poet and founding member of the organization of the Greek minority, Omonoia.

== Nearest places ==
- Leshnicë e Poshtme
- Cerkovicë
- Maliçan
- Shëndre
- Dhrovjan
- Kërrë
- Tsamantas (Greece)
