= St. Saviour's Church, Vuno =

Cultural monument of Albania

St. Saviour's Church
- Kisha e Shën Sotirës (Albanian)
- Location: Vuno

Cultural Monument of Albania

St. Saviour's Church (Albanian: Kisha e shën Sotirës) is an Albanian Orthodox church in Vuno, Vlorë County, Albania. It is a Cultural Monument of Albania.
