= St. John's Church, Delvinë =

Cultural monument in Albania

St. John's Church
- Kisha e Shën Janit (Albanian)
- Interactive map of St. John's Church
- Location: Delvinë District

Cultural Monument of Albania

St. John's Church (Albanian: Kisha e Shën Janit) is a church in Delvinë District, Albania. It is a Cultural Monument of Albania.
