= Ancit Church =

Church in Breg-Lum, Albania

Kisha e ancitit
- Location: Breg-Lum

Cultural Monument of Albania

Kisha e ancitit is a church in Breg-Lum, Kukës County, Albania. It is a Cultural Monument of Albania.
