= St. George's Church, Brataj =

Cultural Monument in Albania

St. George's Church
- Rrënojat e kishës së Shën Gjergjit (Albanian)
- Location: Brataj

Cultural Monument of Albania

St. George's Church (Albanian: Rrënojat e kishës së Shën Gjergjit) is a ruined church in Brataj, Vlorë County, Albania. It is a Cultural Monument of Albania.
