= Castle Church, Drisht =

Church in Drisht Castle, Albania

Drisht Castle Church
- Kisha Trikonëshe në Kalanë e Drishtit (Albanian)
- Location: Drisht

Cultural Monument of Albania

The Drisht Castle Church (Albanian: Kisha Trikonëshe në Kalanë e Drishtit) is a church in Drisht Castle, in Drisht, Shkodër County, Albania. It is a Cultural Monument of Albania.
