= Paleochristian Basilica, Goricë =

Cultural Monument in Albania

- Rrënojat e Bazilikës paleokristiane Goricë (Albanian)
- Location: near Gjirokastër

Cultural Monument of Albania

The ruined Paleochristian Basilica in Goricë (Albanian: Rrënojat e Bazilikës paleokristiane Goricë) is a Cultural Monument of Albania, located near Gjirokastër.
