= St. Mark's Church, Vau i Dejës =

Cultural monument of Albania

- Interactive map of St. Mark's Church, Vau i Dejës
- 42.0134°N 19.6255°E
- Location: Vau i Dejës

Cultural Monument of Albania

The ruined St. Mark's Church is a Cultural Monument of Albania, located in Vau i Dejës Castle, Vau i Dejës.
