= Church ruins, Dashajt =

Cultural Monument of Albania

Church ruins
- Rrënojat e Kishës së Dashajt (Albanian)
- Location: Dashaj në Stanajt

Cultural Monument of Albania

The Church ruins (Albanian: Rrënojat e Kishës së Dashajt) in Dashaj në Stanajt, Tepelenë District, Albania are a Cultural Monument of Albania.
