= St. Mary's Church, Krujë =

Cultural Monument of Albania

- Rrënojat e Kishës së Shën Mërisë (Albanian)

Cultural Monument of Albania

The ruins of St. Mary's Church (Albanian: Rrënojat e Kishës së Shën Mërisë) is a Cultural Monument of Albania, located in Shën Mëri, Krujë District.
