= St. George's Church, Dardhë =

Cultural monument in Albania

St. George's Church
- Kisha e Shën Gjergjit (Albanian)
- Location: Dardhë

Cultural Monument of Albania

St. George's Church (Albanian: Kisha e Shën Gjergjit) is an Albanian Orthodox church in Dardhë, Korçë County, Albania. It has been a Cultural Monument of Albania since 1970.
