= Basilica of Ballsh =

- Bazilika e Ballshit (Albanian)
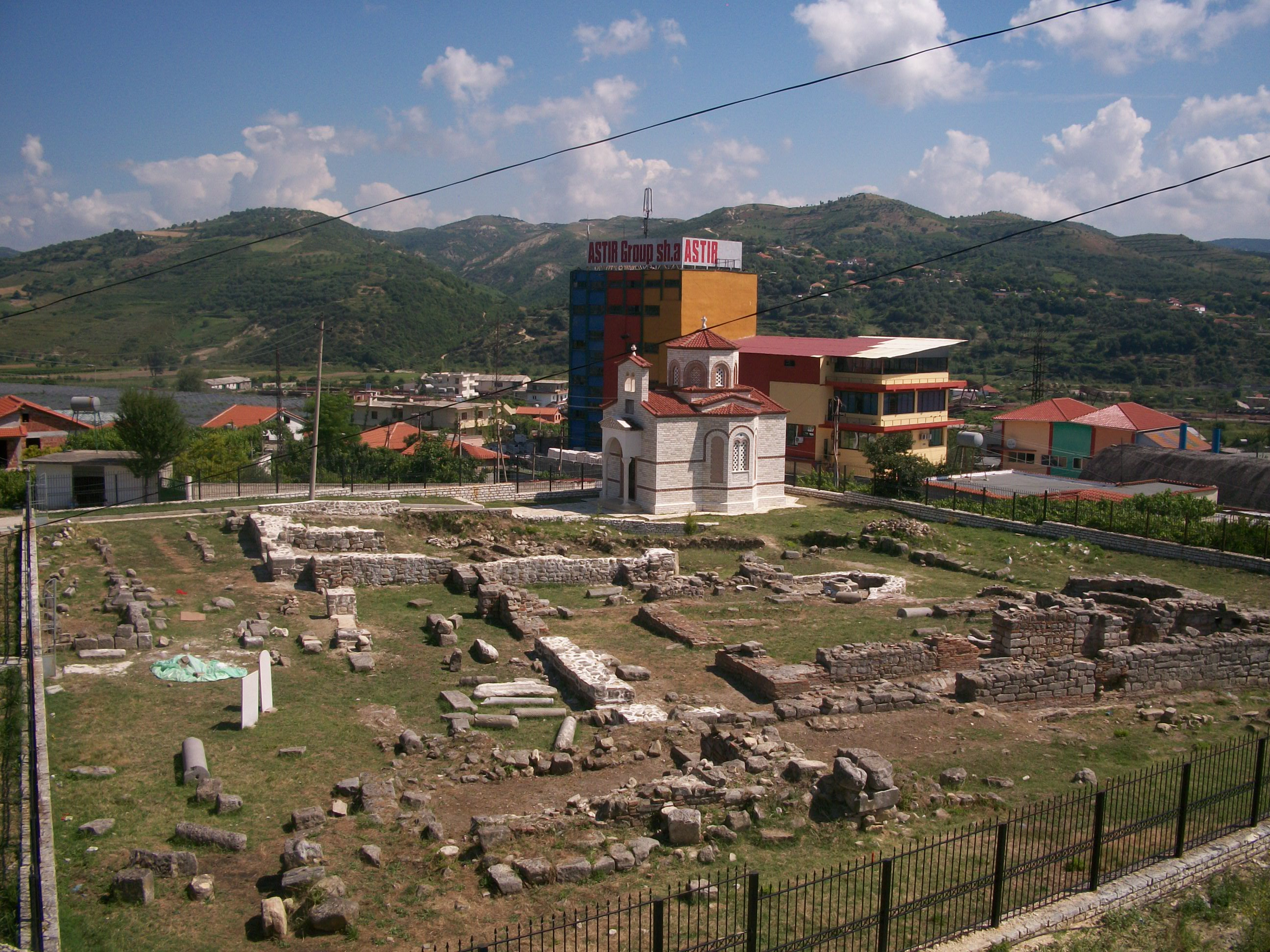
- Location: Ballsh

Cultural Monument of Albania

The Basilica of Ballsh (Albanian: Bazilika e Ballshit) is a Cultural Monument of Albania, located in Ballsh, Fier County.
