= St. Saviour's Church, Tremishtë =

Cultural monument of Albania

St. Saviour's Church
- Kisha e Shën Sotirit (Albanian)
- Location: Tremishtë

Cultural Monument of Albania

St. Saviour's Church (Albanian: Kisha e Shën Sotirit) is a church in Tremishtë, Gjirokastër County, Albania. It is a Cultural Monument of Albania.
