= Sanctuary, Shkodër =

Cultural monument of Albania

Sanctuary
- Faltorja (kishë-xhami) (Albanian)
- Location: Shkodër

Cultural Monument of Albania

The Sanctuary (church-mosque) (Albanian: Faltorja (kishë-xhami)) in Shkodër, Albania is a Cultural Monument of Albania.
