= St. Mary's Monastery, Kakome =

Pre-Ottoman monastery in Albania

St. Mary's Monastery
- Manastiri Shën Mërisë (Albanian)
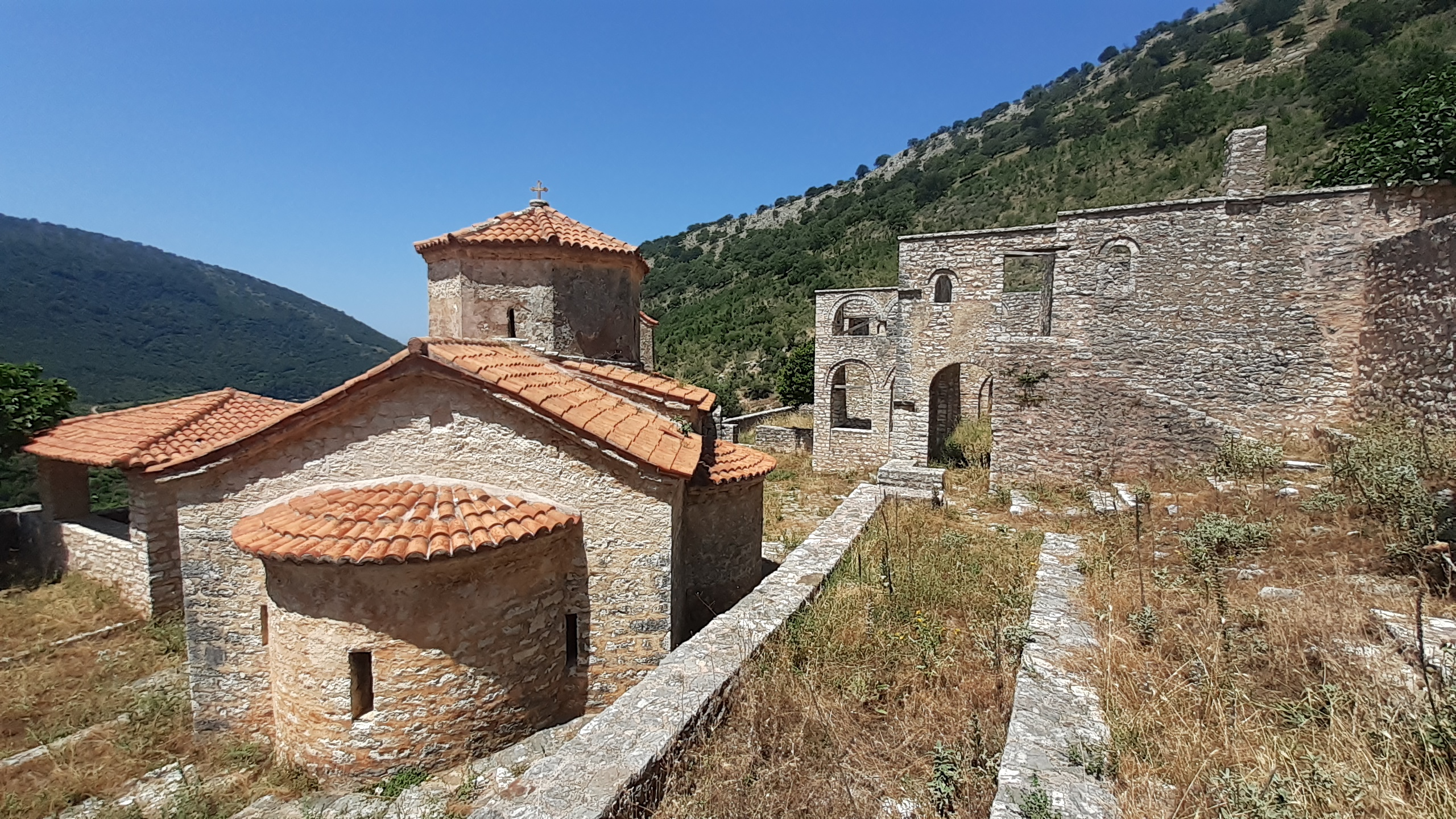
- Interactive map of St. Mary's Monastery
- 39.9310°N 19.9499°E
- Location: Kakome

Cultural Monument of Albania

St. Mary's Monastery (Albanian: Manastiri Shën Mërisë) is an Albanian Orthodox monastery in Kakome, Vlorë County, Albania. It is a Cultural Monument of Albania.

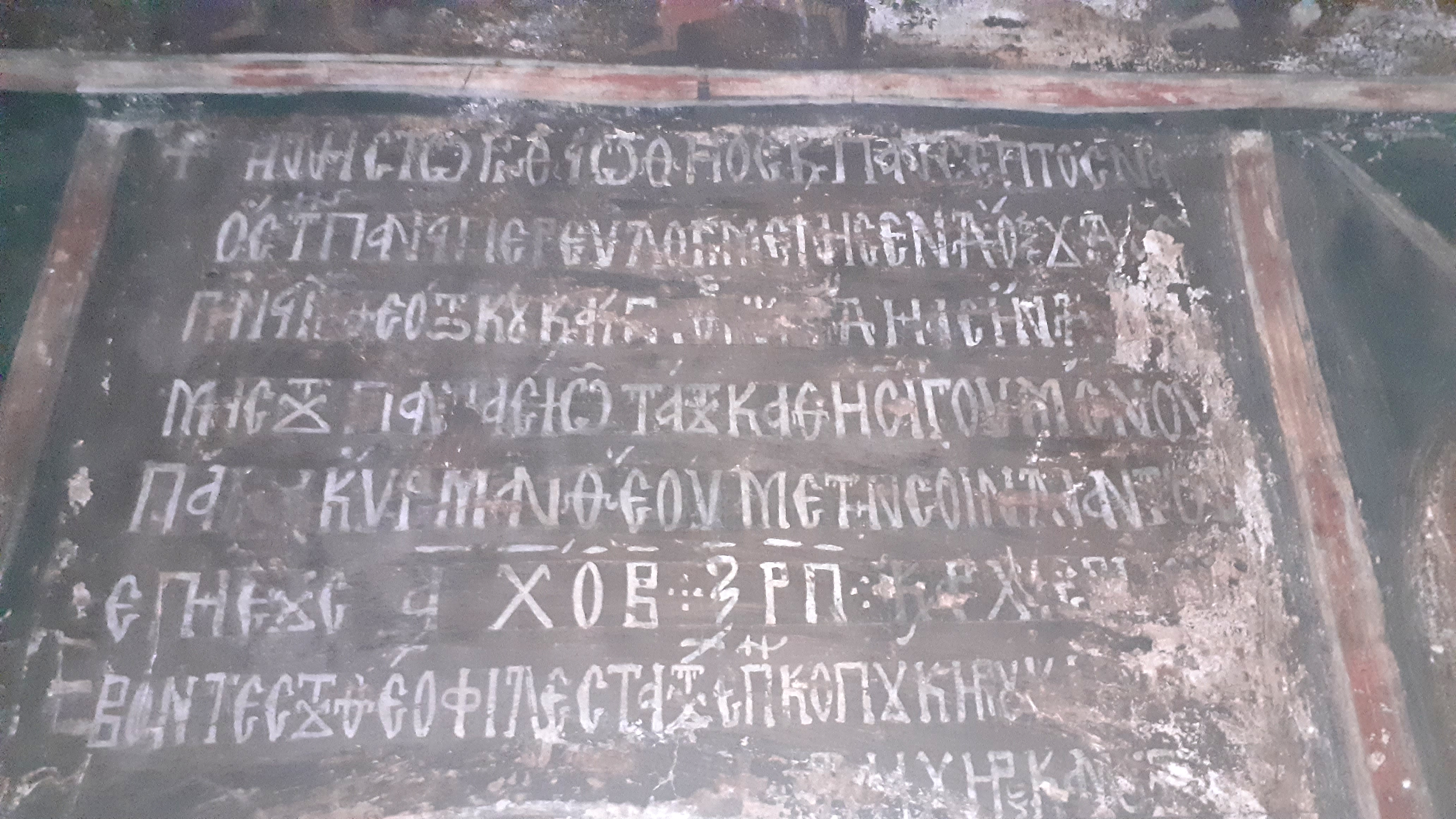
The Ctetoric inscription (in Orthodox tradition ctetoric is called an inscription set by the founder of a church or monastery at its entrance (or by someone who had renovated the church), that mentions the name of the founder and the date) in Greek begins as follows: ΑΝΙΣΤΟΡΗΘΗ Ο ΘΕΙΟΣ ΚΑΙ ΠΑΝΣΕΠΤΟΣ ΝΑΟΣ ΤΗΣ ΠΑΝΑΓΙΑΣ ΕΥΛΟΓΗΜΕΝΗΣ="The divine and most sacred church of Virgin Mary the Blessed was decorated again...", a very common stereotypical phrase in the beginning of Greek Orthodox ctetoric inscriptions

== Description and history ==
The church is a triconch (triple apse) edifice similar to the cross-and-dome models of the pre-Ottoman era. The nave and altar area are separated by a wooden iconostasis. Despite the long, narrow nave, the interior is spacious. The apses are covered by cylindrical arches opening to the central nave. The nave features four windows in the side apses, while the altar is illuminated by three more small windows. Four inner columns create a square platform on which the octagonal dome rests. The double-tiled roof is higher above the northern and southern apses. The church was built by the same craftsmen behind St. Mary's Monastery near Sarandë.

The church was painted in 1672 by Mihal Jerma. The church was burned by the Luftwaffe during World War II. A 500-page leather-bound copy of the Gospels was stolen then and ended up in the Louvre. The bell was donated by the King of Naples in 1695 and inscribed “Dedicated to the Captains of Lukovë” after the seat of the feudal lord of the area.

Fresco Gallery
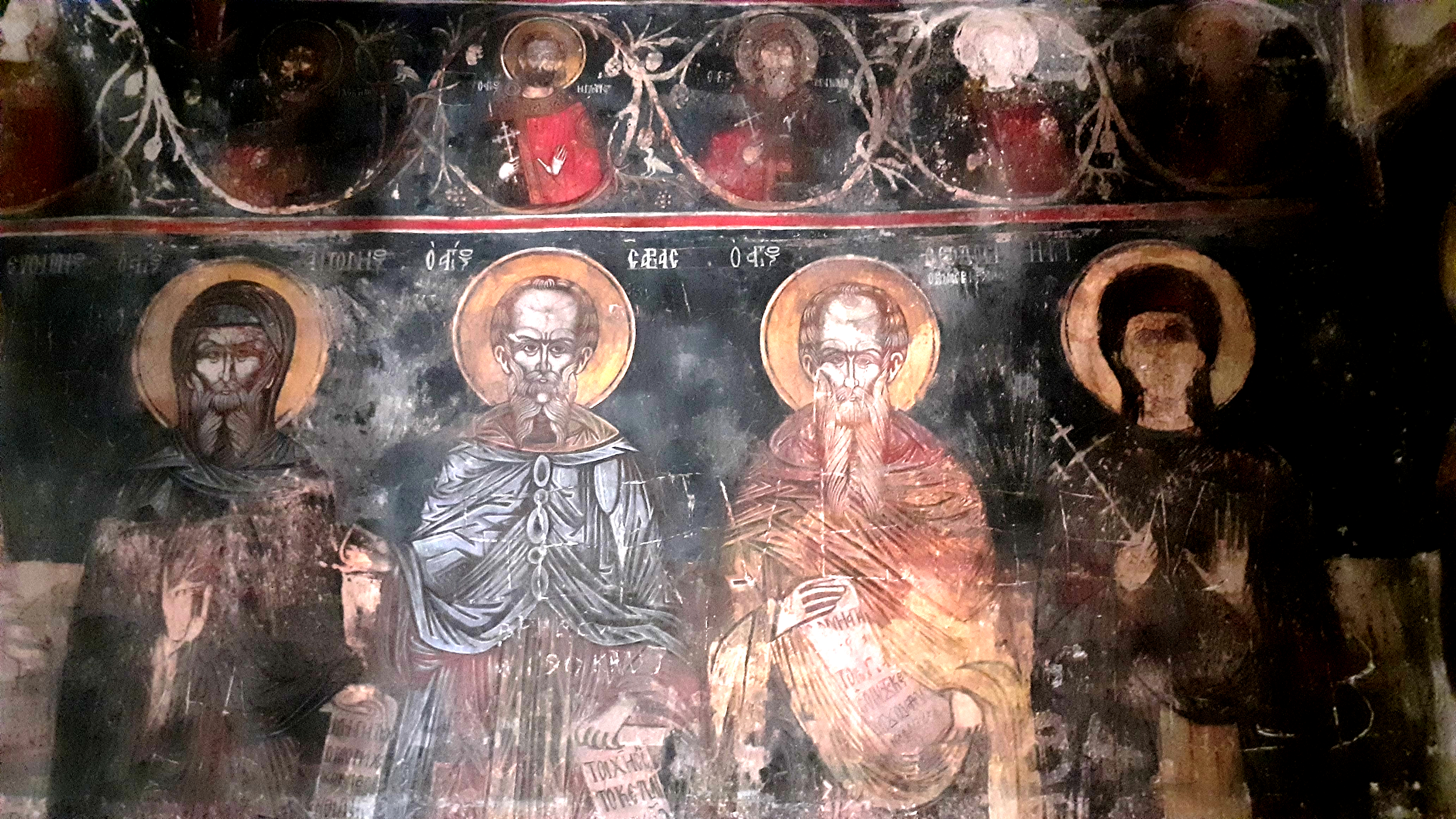

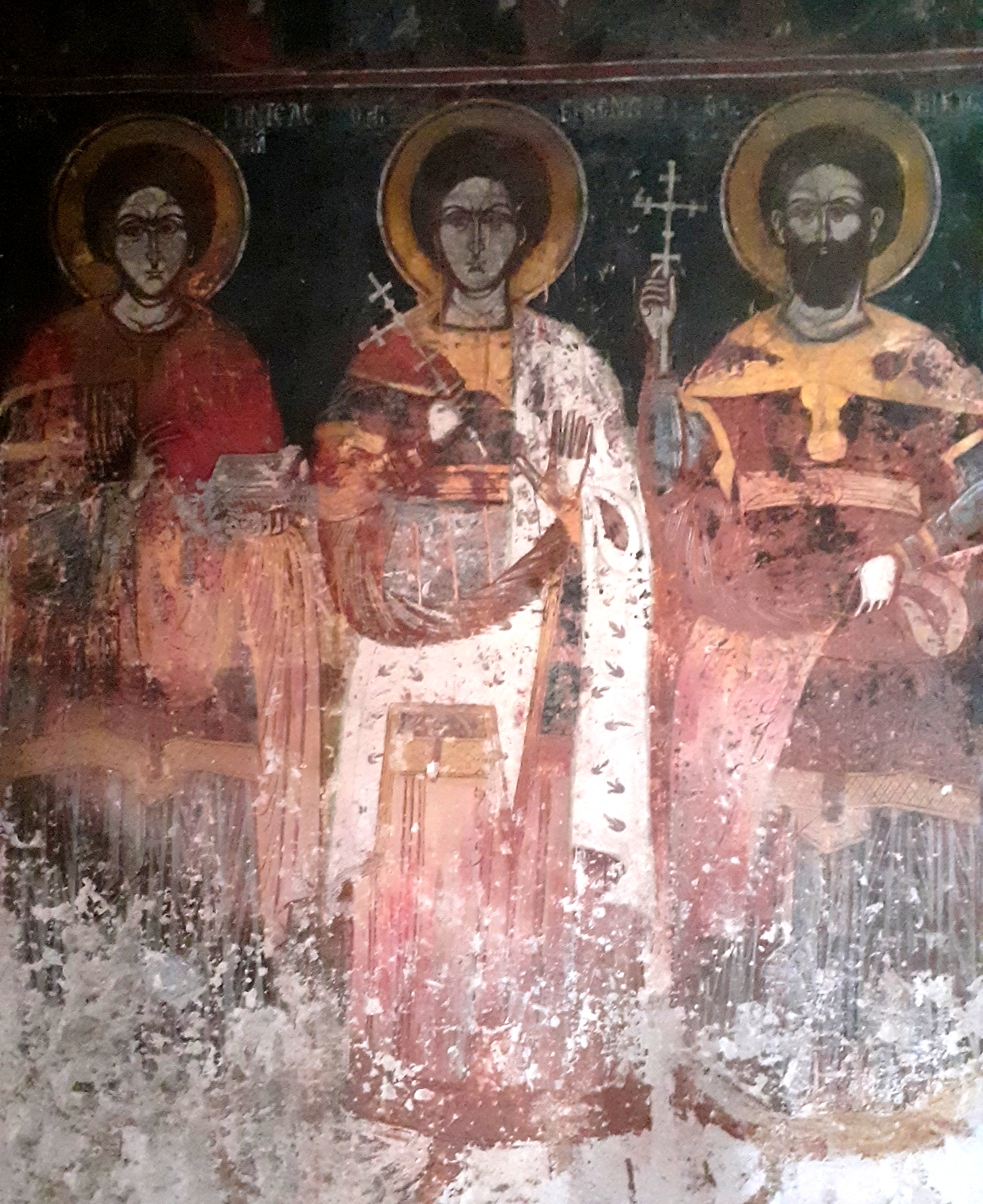

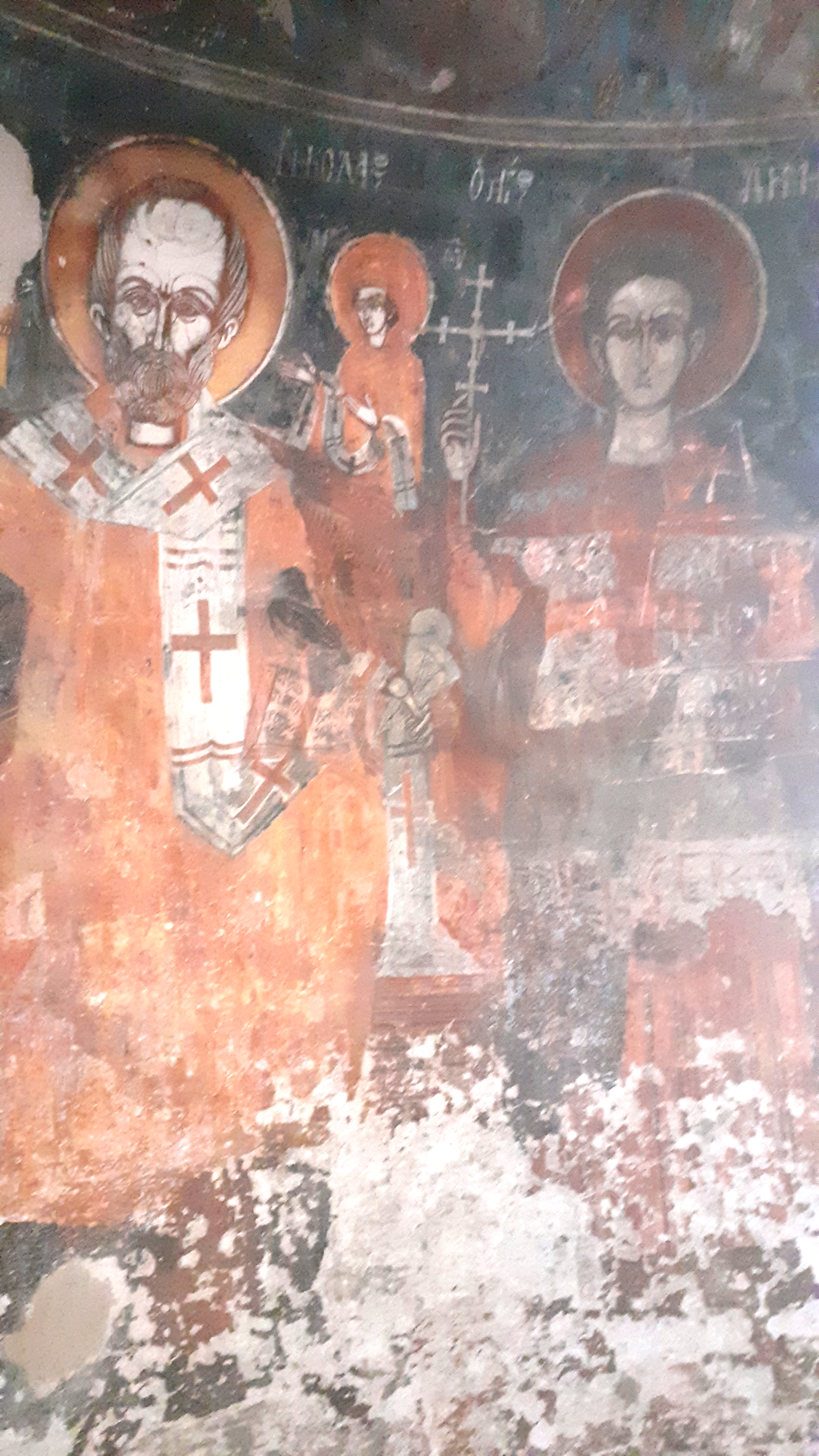

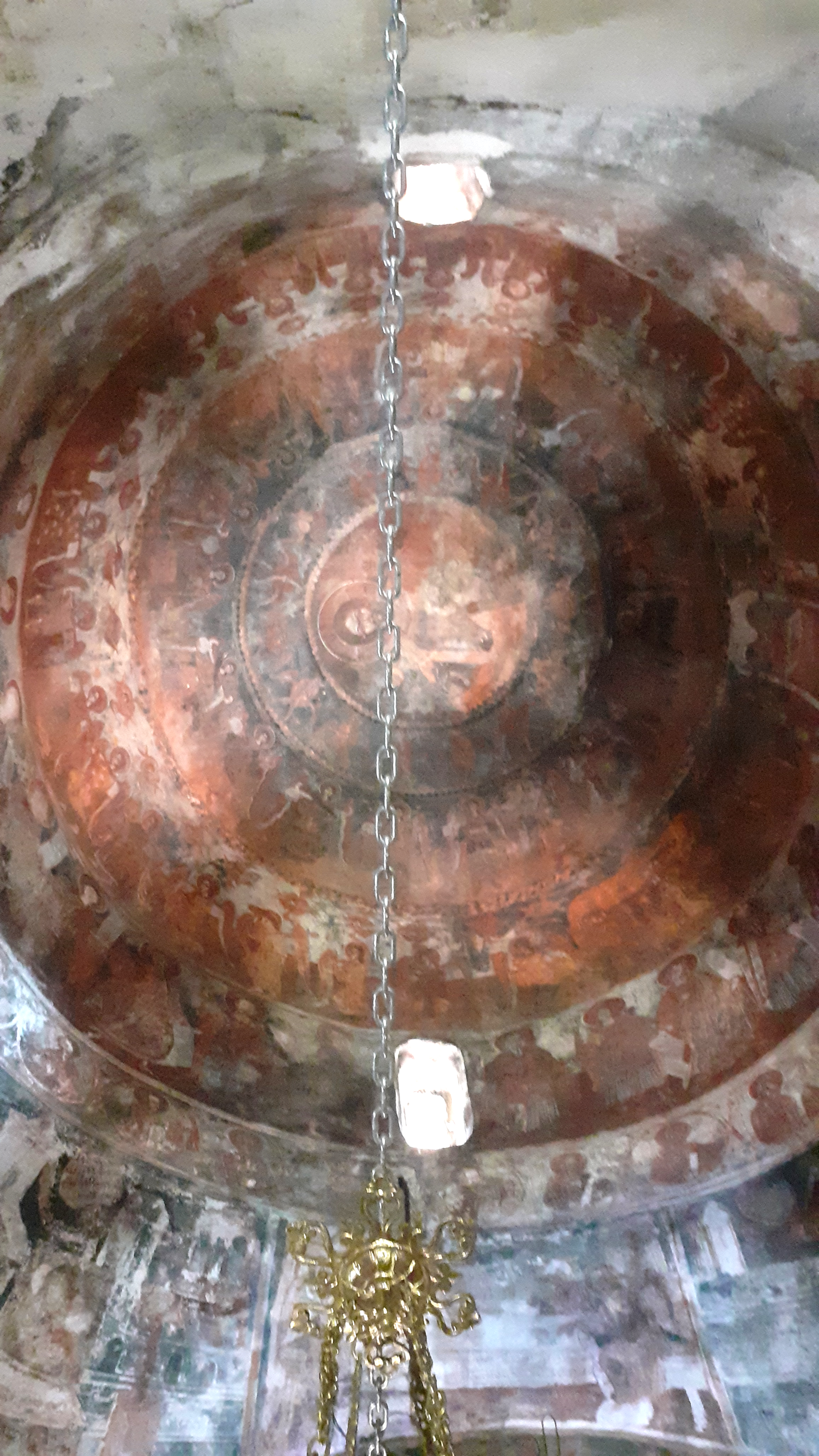

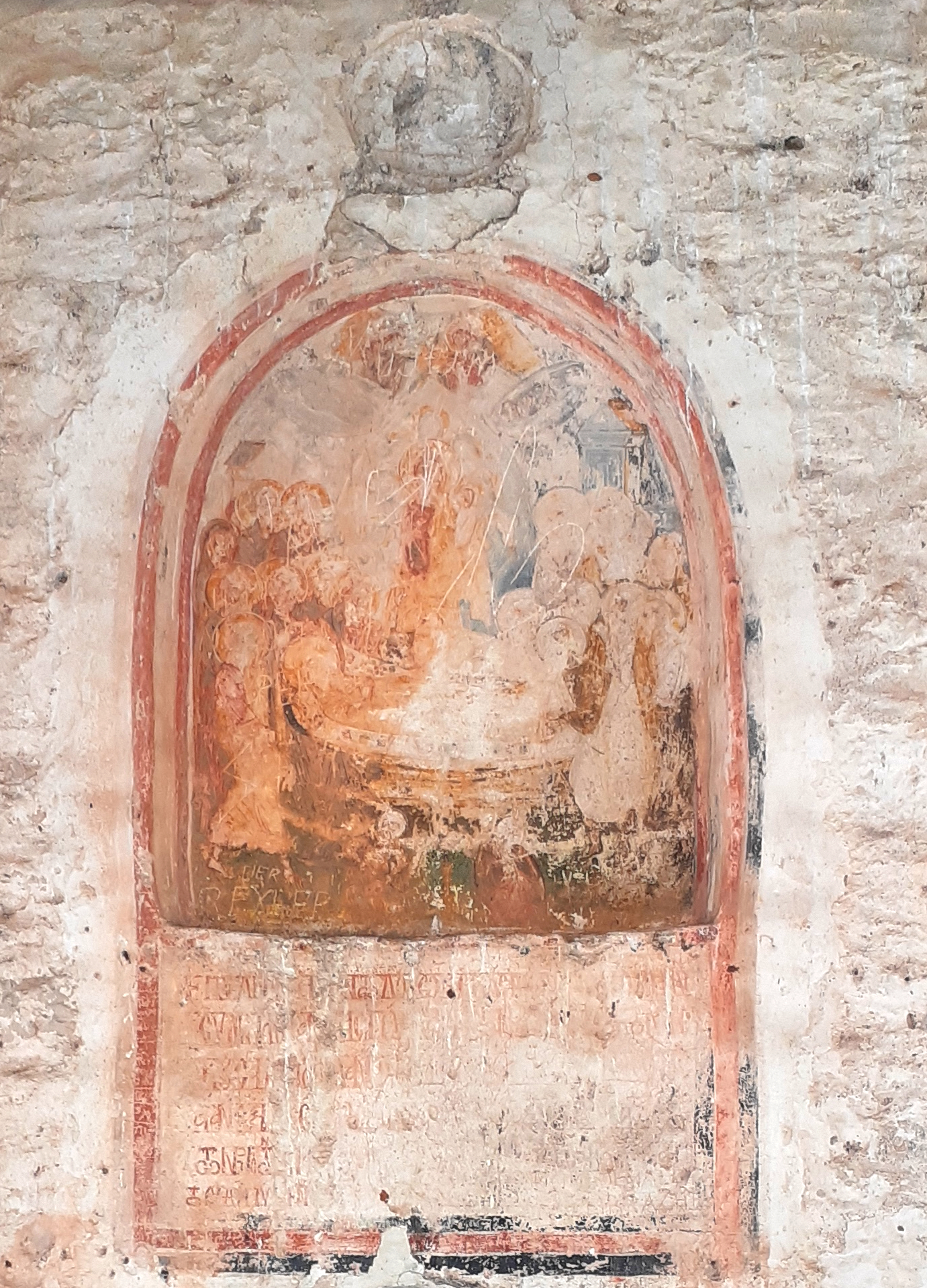
