= St. Mary's Church, Surrel =

Cultural Monument of Albania

St. Mary's Church
- Rrënojat e Kishës Shën Mëri (Albanian)
- Interactive map of St. Mary's Church
- Location: Surrel

Cultural Monument of Albania

St. Mary's Church (Albanian: Rrënojat e Kishës Shën Mëri) is a ruined church in Surrel, Tirana County, Albania. It is a Cultural Monument of Albania.
