= Ancient temple, Livadhja =

Ancient temple
- Tempulli Antik (Albanian)
- Location: near Livadhja

Cultural Monument of Albania

The Ancient temple (Albanian: Tempulli Antik) near Livadhja, Vlorë County, Albania, is a Cultural Monument of Albania.
