= St. Mary's Monastery Church, Dhivër =

Cultural monument in Albania

St. Mary's Monastery Church
- Kisha e Manastirit të Shën Mërisë Mavrodhivrit (Albanian)
- Location: Dhivër

Cultural Monument of Albania

St. Mary's Monastery Church (Albanian: Kisha e Manastirit të Shën Mërisë Mavrodhivrit) is a monastery church in Dhivër, Vlorë County, Albania. It is a Cultural Monument of Albania.
