= Kuvend of Dukagjin =

Cultural monument of Albania

- Kuvendi i Dukagjinit (Albanian)
- Location: Dukagjin

Cultural Monument of Albania

The Kuvend of Dukagjin (Albanian: Kuvendi i Dukagjinit) is a Cultural Monument of Albania. The word Kuvend in the Albanian Kanun means convention and was a particular and regulated form of parliament.
