= Mezhan Church =

Cultural monument of Albania

- Kisha e Mezhanit (Albanian)
- Location: Poliçan

Cultural Monument of Albania

Mezhan Church (Albanian: Kisha e Mezhanit) is a church in Poliçan, Gjirokastër County, Albania. It is a Cultural Monument of Albania.
