= Church ruins, Belsh =

Cultural Monument in Albania

Church ruins
- Interactive map of Church ruins
- Location: Belsh

Cultural Monument of Albania

The Church ruins in Belsh, Elbasan County, Albania have been designated a Cultural Monument of Albania in 1973.
