= St. Elijah's Monastery Church, Jorgucat =

Cultural monument of Albania

St. Elijah's Monastery Church
- Kisha e Manastirit të Shën Ilias (Albanian)
- Interactive map of St. Elijah's Monastery Church
- 39.924°N 20.242°E
- Location: Jorgucat

Cultural Monument of Albania

St. Elijah's Monastery Church (Albanian: Kisha e Manastirit të Shën Ilias) is a monastery church in Jorgucat, Gjirokastër County, Albania. It is a Cultural Monument of Albania.
