= St. Nicholas' Church, Armen =

Cultural monument of Albania

St. Nicholas' Church
- Rrënojat e Kishës së Shën Kollit (Albanian)
- Location: Armen

Cultural Monument of Albania

St. Nicholas' Church (Albanian: Rrënojat e Kishës së Shën Kollit) is a ruined church in Armen, Vlorë County, Albania. It is a Cultural Monument of Albania.
