= St. Michael's Church, Menshat =

Cultural Monument of Albania

St. Michael's Church
- Rrënojat e Kishës së Shën Mëhillit (Albanian)
- Location: Menshat

Cultural Monument of Albania

St. Michael's Church (Albanian: Rrënojat e Kishës së Shën Mëhillit) is a ruined church in Menshat, Lezhë District, Albania. It is a Cultural Monument of Albania.
