= St. Paraskevi's Church, Hllomo =

Cultural monument of Albania

St. Paraskevi's Church
- Kisha e Shën Premtes (Albanian)
- Interactive map of St. Paraskevi's Church
- 40.0680°N 20.3465°E
- Location: Hllomo

Cultural Monument of Albania

St. Paraskevi's Church (Albanian: Kisha e Shën Premtes) is a church in Hllomo, Gjirokastër County, Albania. It is a Cultural Monument of Albania.
