= St. Andrew's Church, Himarë =

Cultural monument in Albania

St. Andrew's Church
- Rrënojat e Kishës së Shën Ndreut (Albanian)
- Location: Himarë

Cultural Monument of Albania

St. Andrew's Church (Albanian: Rrënojat e Kishës së Shën Ndreut) is a ruined church in Himarë, Vlorë County, Albania. It is a Cultural Monument of Albania.
