= Xhemahallë complex =

Coordinates: 39.9450°N 20.0917°E

Xhemahallë Complex
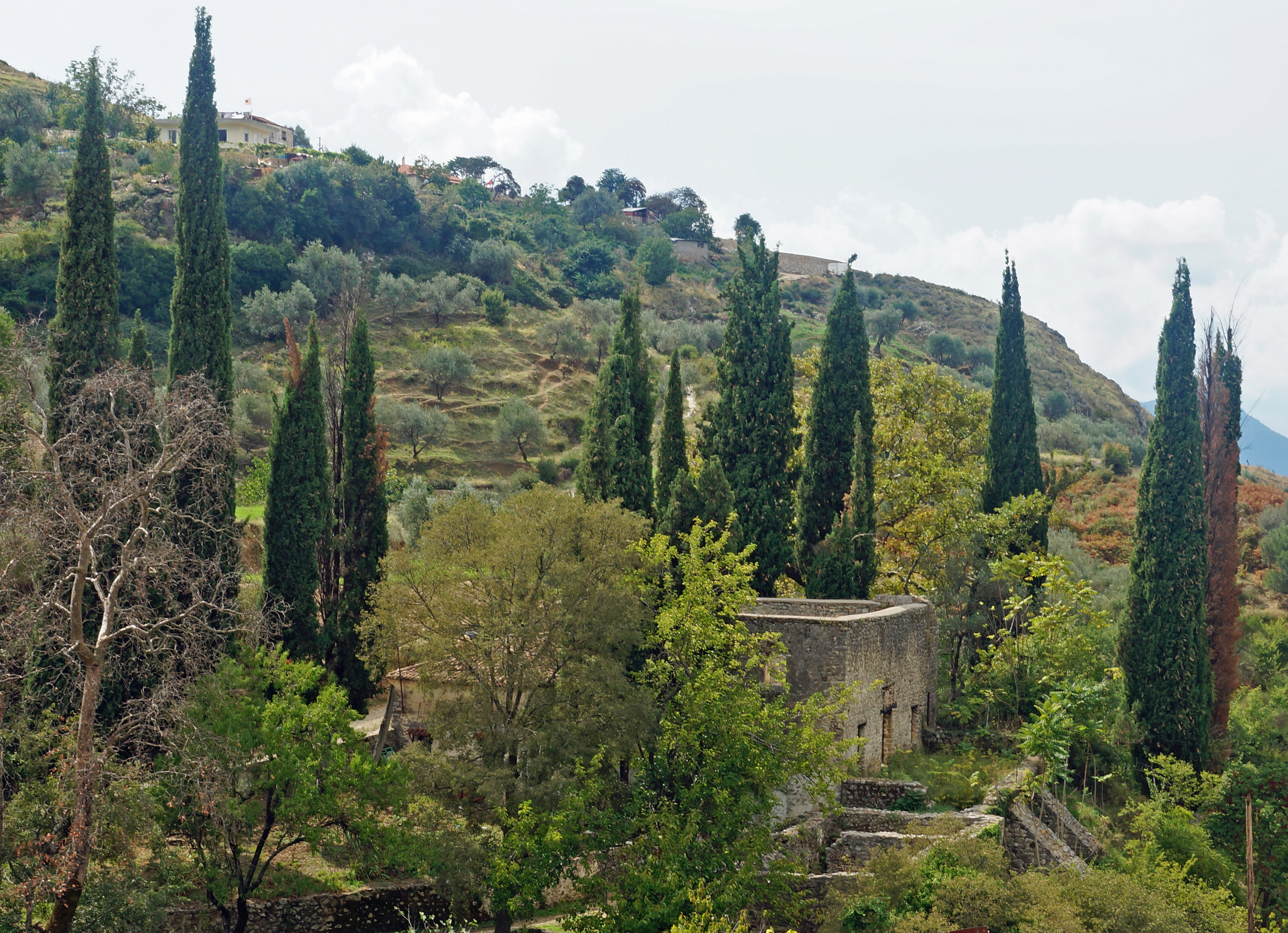
- Ruins of the mosque
- Interactive map of Xhemahallë Complex

History
- Built: 1682

Cultural Monument of Albania

The Xhemahallë Complex (Albanian: Kompleksi i Xhemahallës) is a Cultural Monument of Albania, located in Delvinë. The mosque of the complex is thought to be the first "King type" mosque in Albania. Built in 1682, it one of the first mosques built for the local pasha class and is supplied by Llutro's Fountain, a source of water for the mosque itself as well as the adjoining madrasa and hammam (Turkish bathhouse).
