= Paleochristian Monastery Church, Nepravishtë =

Cultural monument of Albania

Paleochristian Monastery Church
- Kisha Paleokristiane e Manastirit (Albanian)
- Interactive map of Paleochristian Monastery Church
- Location: Nepravishtë

Cultural Monument of Albania

The Paleochristian Monastery Church (Albanian: Kisha Paleokristiane e Manastirit) in Nepravishtë, Gjirokastër County, Albania is a Cultural Monument of Albania.
