= Church ruins, Krujë =

Church in Albania

Church ruins
- Rrënoja kishash (Albanian)

Cultural Monument of Albania

Church ruins (Albanian: Rrënoja kishash) is a Cultural Monument of Albania in Krujë.
