= St. Marina's Cave =

Cultural monument in Albania

- Shpella e Shën Marenës (Albanian)
- Location: Livadhja

Cultural Monument of Albania

St. Marina's Cave (Albanian: Shpella e Shën Marenës) is a cave in Livadhja, Vlorë County, Albania. It is a Cultural Monument of Albania.
