= Gjuricaj Basilica =

6th century basilica in Albania

- Kisha e fshatit Gjuricë (Albanian)
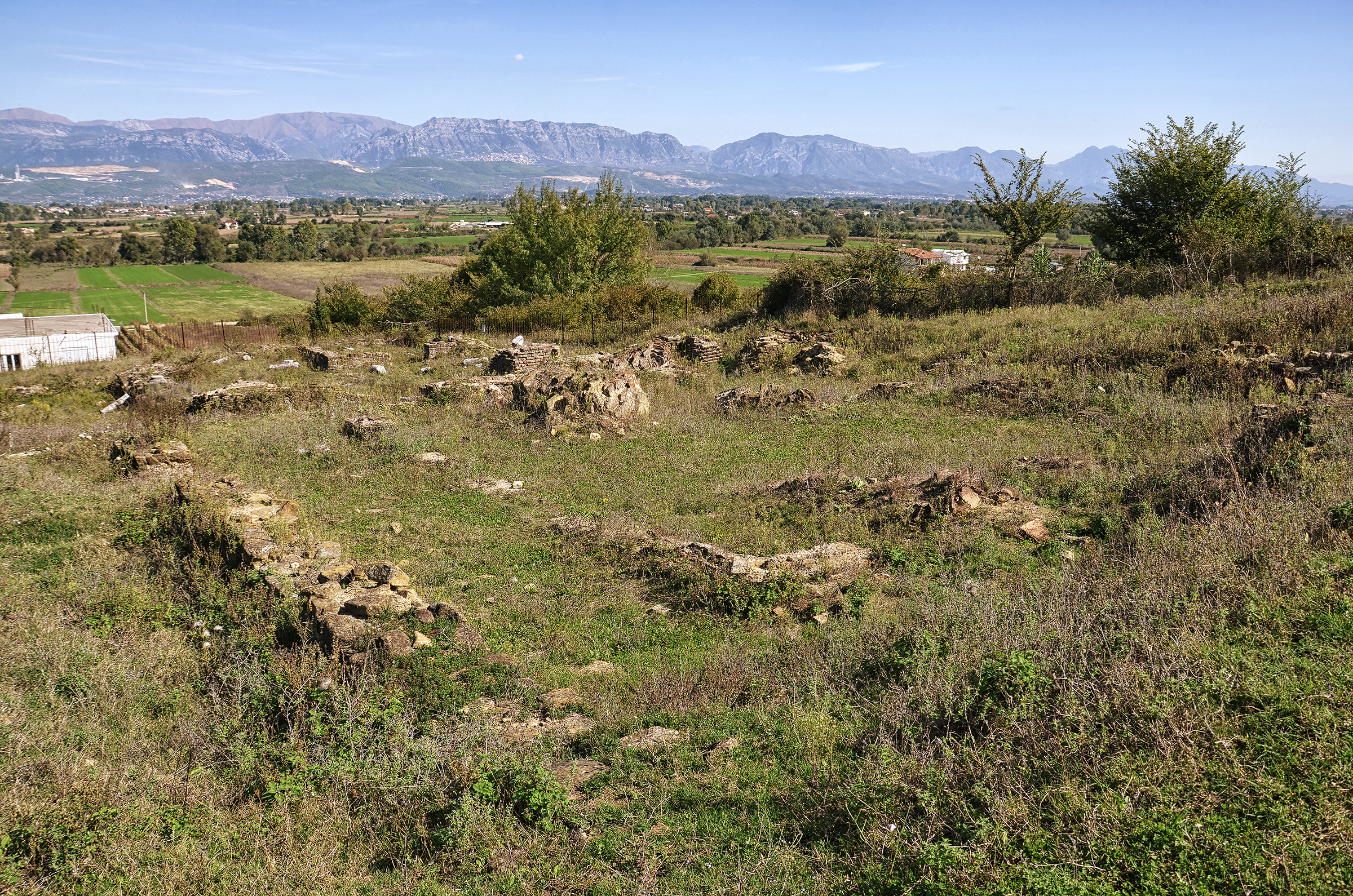

- Location within Albania
- 41.526°N 19.617°E
- Location: Ishëm, Durrës County, Albania

History
- Built: 5th century to 6th century

Site notes
- Governing body: DRKK Durrës

Cultural Monument of Albania
- Type: Archaeological
- Criteria: I
- Designated: 2006
- Part of: 194, April 21, 2006
- Reference no.: DR006

The Gjuricaj Basilica (Albanian: Kisha e fshatit Gjuricë or Bazilika e Gjuricajt) is a Cultural Monument of Albania, located in the village Gjuricaj, Durrës municipality.

The basilica dates to the 5th to 6th century and was discovered in 1980. There are still no signs along nearby roads indicating its presence.
