= Paleochristian Church, Lin =

Church in Albania

Coordinates: 41.0660°N 20.6448°E

Paleochristian Church and Mosaics
- Rrënojat e Kishës Paleokristian & mozaikët (Albanian)
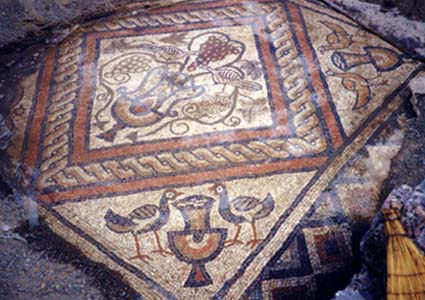
- Interactive map of Paleochristian Church and Mosaics
- Location: Lin

Cultural Monument of Albania

The Paleochristian Church (Albanian: Rrënojat e Kishës Paleokristian) is a ruined church in Lin, Korçë County, Albania. Mosaics from the 4th-5th century have been discovered during excavations. It is a Cultural Monument of Albania.
