= Zejmen =

- Administrative unit
- Location within Albania
- Coordinates: 41°43′N 19°41′E
- Country: Albania
- County: Lezhë
- Municipality: Lezhë

Population (2023)
  - Administrative unit: 4,042
- Time zone: UTC+1 (CET)
  - Summer (DST): UTC+2 (CEST)

Zejmen is a village and a former municipality in the Lezhë County, northwestern Albania. At the 2015 local government reform it became a subdivision of the municipality Lezhë. The population at the 2023 census was 4,042.

== Demographic history ==
Zejmen (Zojmen) is recorded in the Ottoman defter of 1467 as a village in the timar of Abdullah in the vilayet of Dimitri Gjonima. The settlement had a total of five households represented by the following household heads: Gjergj Gjika, Gjon Sujma, Domenik Hajmili, Progon Nizha, and Dimitri Dromshi.
