= St. Paraskevi's Church, Vallesh =

Cultural Monument of Albania

St. Paraskevi's Church
- Kisha e Shën Premtes (Albanian)
- Location: Valësh

Cultural Monument of Albania

St. Paraskevi's Church (Albanian: Kisha e Shën Premtes) is a church in Valësh, Elbasan County, Albania. It became a Cultural Monument of Albania in 1963.
