= St. Alexander's Church, Bokion =

Cultural monument of Albania

St. Alexander's Church
- Kisha e Shën Aleksandrit (Albanian)
- Location: Bokion

Cultural Monument of Albania

St. Alexander's Church (Albanian: Kisha e Shën Aleksandrit) is a church in Bokion, Lezhë District, Albania. It is a Cultural Monument of Albania.
