= Vergo =

- Administrative unit
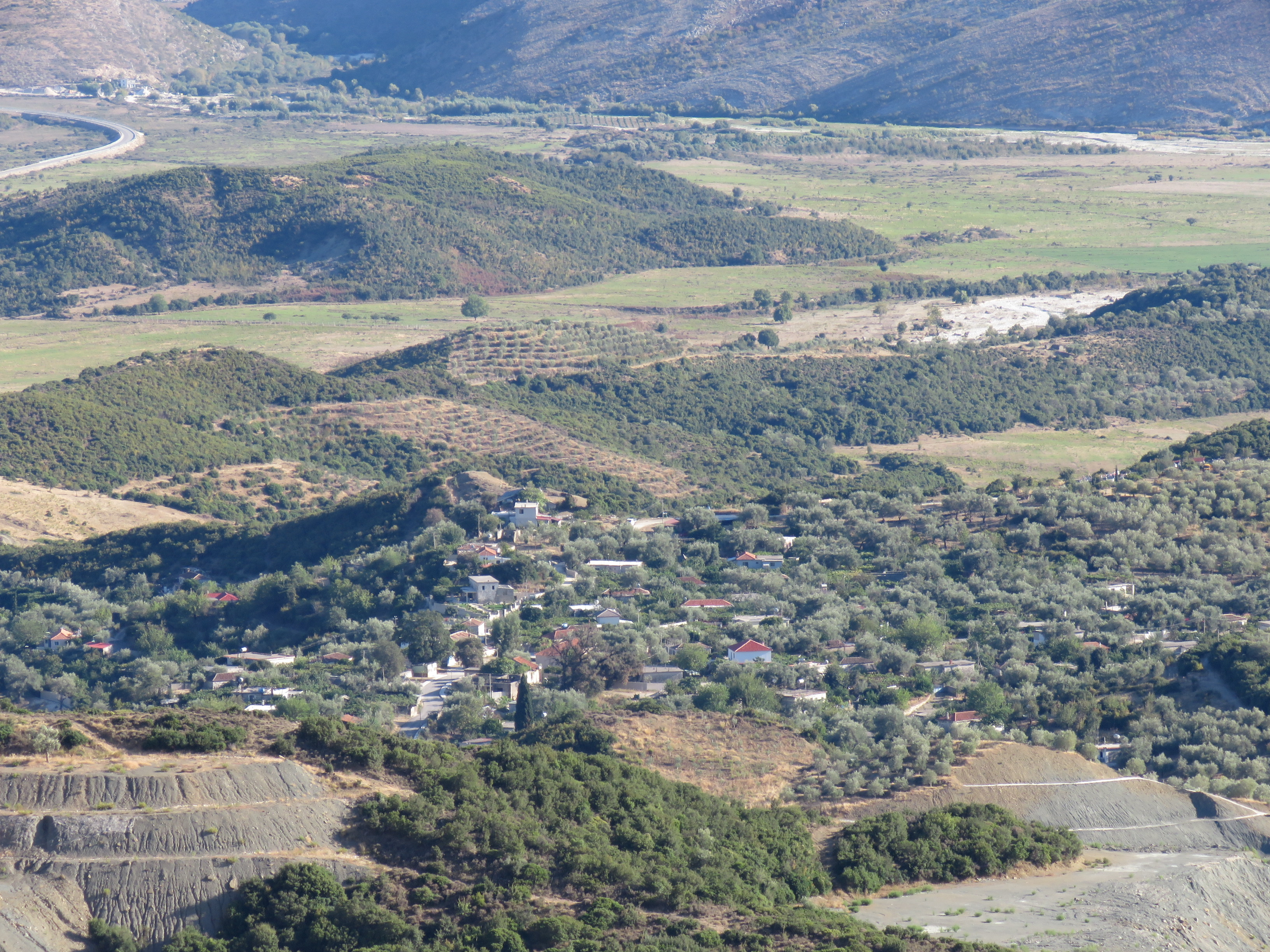
- The village of Fushë-Vërri in Vergo

- Location within Albania
- Coordinates: 40°0′N 20°1′E
- Country: Albania
- County: Vlorë
- Municipality: Delvinë

Population (2023)
  - Administrative unit: 1,214
- Time zone: UTC+1 (CET)
  - Summer (DST): UTC+2 (CEST)

Vergo is a village and a former municipality in the Vlorë County, southern Albania. At the 2015 local government reform, it became a subdivision of the Delvinë municipality. The population at the 2023 census was 1,214.

The municipal unit consists of the villages Vergo, Tatzat, Kalasë, Fushë Vërri, Kopaçez, Qafë Dardhë (previously: Palavli) and Bajkaj inhabited by Muslim Albanians, and Senicë, populated by an Orthodox Albanian population, making up 94% and 6% of the total each.

In 1779, a Greek school was founded in Vergo by Orthodox missionary, Kosmas the Aetolian.
