= Sinjë =

- Administrative unit
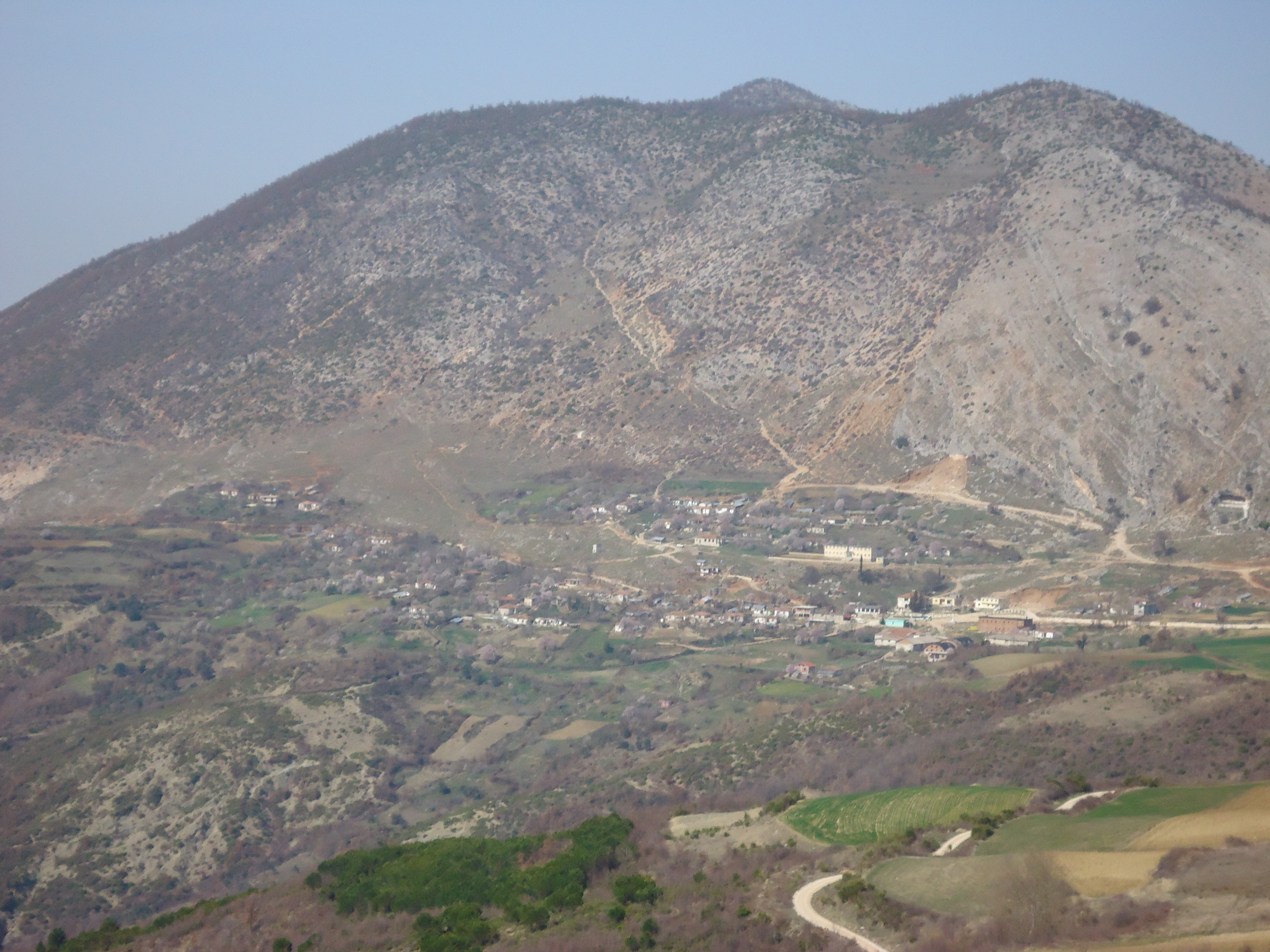
- Sinjë village

- Location within Albania
- Coordinates: 40°38′48″N 19°52′09″E
- Country: Albania
- County: Berat
- Municipality: Berat

Population (2011)
  - Administrative unit: 3,351
- Time zone: UTC+1 (CET)
  - Summer (DST): UTC+2 (CEST)

Sinjë is a village and a former municipality in Berat County, central Albania. At the 2015 local government reform it became a subdivision of the municipality Berat. The population at the 2011 census was 3,351.
