= St. Paraskevi Church (Përmet) =

Cultural monument of Albania

St. Paraskevi's Church
- Kisha e Shën Premtes (Albanian)
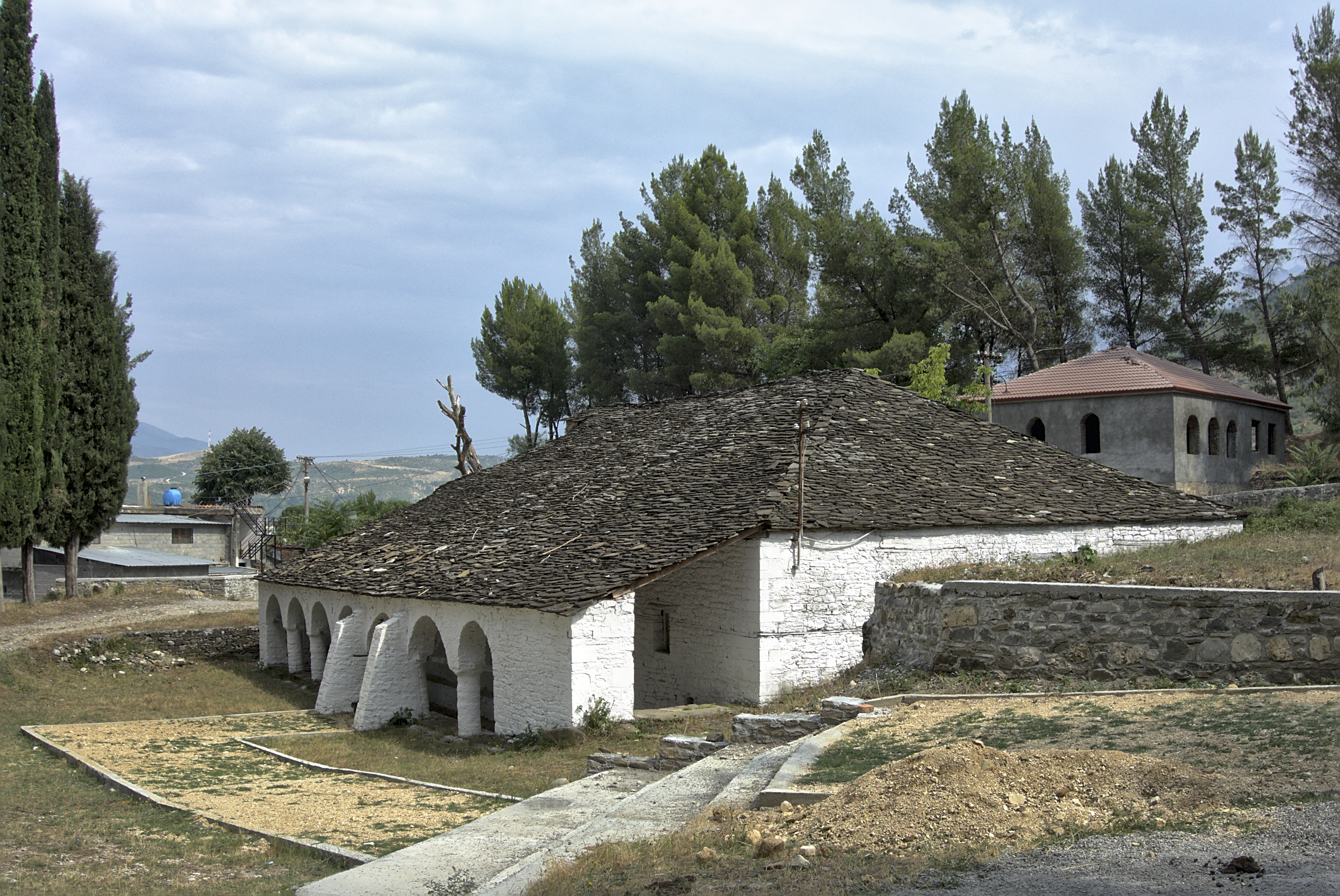
- Kisha e Shën Premtes of Përmet
- Interactive map of St. Paraskevi's Church
- 40.2306°N 20.3541°E
- Location: Përmet

Cultural Monument of Albania

St. Paraskevi's Church (Albanian: Kisha e Shën Premtes) is a church in Përmet, Gjirokastër County, Albania. It became a Cultural Monument of Albania in 1963.
