= St. Mary's Monastery Church, Lubonjë =

Cultural monument in Albania

St. Mary's Monastery Church
- Kisha e Manastirit të Shën Marisë (Albanian)
- Location: Lubonjë

Cultural Monument of Albania

St. Mary's Monastery Church (Albanian: Kisha e Manastirit të Shën Marisë) is a monastery church in Lubonjë, Korçë County, Albania. It is a Cultural Monument of Albania.
