= Cerkovicë =

Cerkovicë Τσερκοβίτσα
- Village
- Location within Albania
- Coordinates: 39°49′37″N 20°12′28″E
- Country: Albania
- County: Vlorë
- Municipality: Finiq
- Administrative unit: Dhivër
- Time zone: UTC+1 (CET)
  - Summer (DST): UTC+2 (CEST)

Cerkovicë (Albanian definite form: Cerkovica; Greek: Τσερκοβίτσα, Tserkovitsa) is a village in the Vlorë County in Albania. At the 2015 local government reform it became part of the municipality Finiq.

== Name ==
The toponym Cerkovicë refers to a place where a church is located and is derived from the Bulgarian word церква/черква, tserkva/cherkva for 'church' and the suffix ов-иц-а, ov-its-a.

== Demographics ==
The village is inhabited by Greeks and the population was 580 in 1992.

== Nearest places ==
- Leshnicë e Poshtme
- Leshnicë e Sipërme
- Maliçan
- Shëndre
