= Qendër Piskovë =

- Administrative unit
- Location within Albania
- Coordinates: 40°17′N 20°16′E
- Country: Albania
- County: Gjirokastër
- Municipality: Përmet

Population (2011)
  - Administrative unit: 1,742
- Time zone: UTC+1 (CET)
  - Summer (DST): UTC+2 (CEST)

Qendër Piskovë is a former municipality in the Gjirokastër County, southern Albania. At the 2015 local government reform it became a subdivision of the municipality Përmet. The population at the 2011 census was 1,742. The municipal unit consists of the villages Piskovë, Bual, Kosinë, Rapckë, Mokricë-Zleushë, Kutal, Kosovë, Hotovë, Odriçan, Raban, Alipostivan, Borockë, Gosnisht, Pagri, Pacomit, Grabovë and Argovë.
