= Leshnicë e Poshtme =

Leshnica e Poshtme Κάτω Λεσινίτσα
- Village
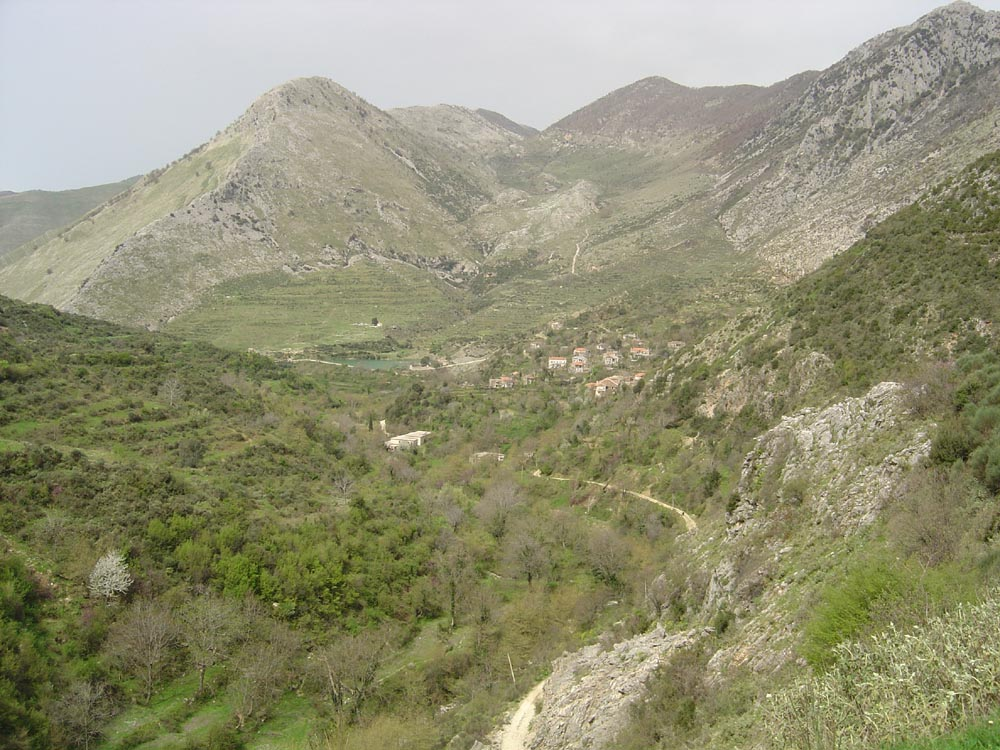
- Part of the village showing some houses and the lake.

- Location within Albania
- Coordinates: 39°50′38″N 20°15′35″E
- Country: Albania
- County: Vlorë
- Municipality: Finiq
- Administrative unit: Dhivër
- Elevation: 648 m (2,126 ft)
- Time zone: UTC+1 (CET)
  - Summer (DST): UTC+2 (CEST)

Leshnicë e Poshtme (Albanian definite form: Leshnica e Poshtme; Greek: Κάτω Λεσινίτσα, Kato Lesinitsa) is a village in the Vlorë County in Albania, adjacent to the Greek-Albanian borders. At the 2015 local government reform it became part of the municipality Finiq. It is located less than 1 km north-west of the Greek border.

== Name ==
The placename Leshnicë has several possible origins. The Bulgarian word леска, leska meaning 'hazel bush' and the suffix -ьн-иц-а, -an-its-a, with the Slavic sound change sk and y into sht and further into sh. The Bulgarian dialectal form лес, les, rendered in old Slavic as лѣсь, les meaning 'forest' and the suffix -ьн+ -иц-а, an+ -its-a, with an old Albanian sound change s into sh. The Bulgarian лешница leshnica meaning 'European bladdernut'. Or from Лес/Леш -ин, Les/Lesh -in and the suffix -иц-а, -its-a, with loss of the unemphasized i.

== Geography ==
The village is situated on an altitude of 648 meters (2129 ft) above the sea-level.

== Demographics ==
The village is inhabited by Greeks. The population was 553 in 1992.

== Nearest places ==
- Leshnica e Sipërme
- Tsamantas
- Cerkovica

== See also ==
- Web site
- Photos from the village
- Video presentation
