= Hllomo =

Hllomo Χλωμό
- Village
- Location within Albania
- Coordinates: 40°04′N 20°21′E
- Country: Albania
- County: Gjirokastër
- Municipality: Dropull
- Administrative unit: Pogon
- Time zone: UTC+1 (CET)
  - Summer (DST): UTC+2 (CEST)
- Postal Code: 6007

Hllomo (Albanian: Hllomoja, Greek: Χλωμό) is one of the six villages of the former commune of Pogon, in southern Albania. At the 2015 local government reform it became part of the municipality Dropull. According to a 2014 report by the Albanian government, there were 410 ethnic Greeks in the village.

== See also ==
- Greeks in Albania
