= St. Mary's Monastery Church, Piqeras =

Cultural monument in Albania

St. Mary's Monastery Church
- Kisha e Manastirit të Shën Mërisë Krimanovës (Albanian)
- Interactive map of St. Mary's Monastery Church
- 40.0211°N 19.8952°E
- Location: Piqeras

Cultural Monument of Albania

St. Mary's Monastery Church (Albanian: Kisha e Manastirit të Shën Mërisë Krimanovës) is an Albanian Orthodox monastery church in Piqeras, Vlorë County, Albania. It is a Cultural Monument of Albania.
