= St. Mary's Monastery Church, Tranoshisht =

Cultural monument in Albania

St. Mary's Monastery Church
- Kisha e Manastirit të Shën Mërisë (Albanian)
- Interactive map of St. Mary's Monastery Church
- Location: Tranoshisht

Cultural Monument of Albania

St. Mary's Monastery Church (Albanian: Kisha e Manastirit të Shën Mërisë) is a monastery church in Tranoshisht, Gjirokastër County, Albania. It is a Cultural Monument of Albania.
