= Mullet, Albania =

Mullet
- Village
- Location within Albania
- Coordinates: 41°16′02″N 19°52′18″E
- Country: Albania
- County: Tirana
- Municipality: Tirana
- Administrative unit: Petrelë
- Time zone: UTC+1 (CET)
  - Summer (DST): UTC+2 (CEST)

Mullet (Albanian definite form: Mulleti) is a village in Tirana County, Albania. At the 2015 local government reform it became part of the municipality Tirana. It lies at an elevation of 551 feet (167 m).

== Notable people ==
- Sulejman Bargjini, founder of the town of Tirana
