= Balldren =

- Administrative unit
- Location within Albania
- Coordinates: 41°49′N 19°38′E
- Country: Albania
- County: Lezhë
- Municipality: Lezhë

Population (2023)
  - Administrative unit: 3,792
- Time zone: UTC+1 (CET)
  - Summer (DST): UTC+2 (CEST)

Balldren is a village and a former municipality in the Lezhë County, northwestern Albania. At the 2015 local government reform it became a subdivision of the municipality Lezhë. The population at the 2023 census was 3,792.

== Etymology ==
The name comes from the Albanian, which means "in front of the Drin". In Latin and later Italian sources, the town was known by the names Blandin or Baladreni.
