= Dërmenas =

- Administrative unit
- Location within Albania
- Coordinates: 40°45′N 19°30′E
- Country: Albania
- County: Fier
- Municipality: Fier

Population (2011)
  - Administrative unit: 7,788
- Time zone: UTC+1 (CET)
  - Summer (DST): UTC+2 (CEST)

Dërmenas is a village and a former municipality in the Fier County, southwestern Albania. At the 2015 local government reform it became a subdivision of the municipality Fier. The population at the 2011 census was 7,788.
