= Rrajcë =

- Administrative unit
- Interactive map of Rrajcë
- Location within Albania
- Coordinates: 41°6′N 20°35′E
- Country: Albania
- County: Elbasan
- Municipality: Prrenjas

Population (2019)
  - Administrative unit: 12,121
- Time zone: UTC+1 (CET)
  - Summer (DST): UTC+2 (CEST)

Rrajcë is a village and a former municipality in Elbasan County, in eastern Albania. As of the 2015 local government reform, it became a subdivision of the municipality of Prrenjas. The population at the 2019 census was 12,121. The subdivision consists of seven villages: Rrajcë Fushë, Sutaj, Skenderbe, Skenderbe Bardhaj, Urakë, Katjel, and Kotodesh. The village of Rrajcë is found within the boundaries of Shebenik-Jabllanicë National Park. The nearby forest was declared part of UNESCO's transnational natural site, The Ancient and Primeval Beech Forests of the Carpathians and Other Regions of Europe.

== Demographics ==
In statistics gathered by Vasil Kanchov in 1900, the village of Rrajcë was inhabited by 840 Albanian Muslims. Other villages in the modern day municipality were not included in those demographic statistics.

During the 2000s, linguists Klaus Steinke and Xhelal Ylli, seeking to corroborate villages cited in past literature as being Slavic speaking, carried out fieldwork. Rrajcë was noted as being fully Muslim and Albanian speaking while the linguists found no contemporary speakers of Slavic languages in the village, with local elderly people stating they spoke only Albanian.
