= Dhivër =

Dhivër Δίβρη
- Administrative unit
- Location within Albania
- Coordinates: 39°50′N 20°10′E
- Country: Albania
- County: Vlorë
- Municipality: Finiq

Population (2011)
  - Administrative unit: 1,396
- Time zone: UTC+1 (CET)
  - Summer (DST): UTC+2 (CEST)

Dhivër (Albanian definite form: Dhivëri; Greek: Δίβρη) is a village and a former municipality in the Vlorë County, southern Albania. At the 2015 local government reform it became a subdivision of the municipality Finiq. The population at the 2011 census was 1,396,

The municipal unit consists of the villages: Dhivër; Rumanxë; Memoraq; Navaricë; Dermish; Leshnicë e Sipërme; Leshnicë e Poshtme; Janicat; Llupsat; Cerkovicë; Shëndre and Maliçan.

== Name ==
The toponym Dhivër is derived from the old Slavic word дьбръ, dybra meaning 'pit, cave', with the old reflex ь, y rendered as ë; with a Greek or Albanian sound change of d into dh, and the Greek sound change b into v.

== Demographics ==
A 1992 study by Leonidas Kallivretakis found that the population of the commune consisted of 91% ethnic Greek Christians and 9% Albanian Muslims; the latter all located in the village of Navaricë. Kallivretakis recorded that the settlement unit of Dhivër at that time was inhabited solely by Greeks. The 2011 census, in which Greeks and other groups have been underrepresented in numbers due to boycott and irregularities: counted 1,065 Greeks and 330 Albanians.
