= Ali Kraja =

Albanian Mufti

- Title: Mufti; Hafiz

Personal life
- Born: 1900 Shkodër, Ottoman Empire
- Died: 1973 (aged 72–73) Shkodër, Communist Albania
- Education: Al-Azhar University

Religious life
- Religion: Islam
- Denomination: Sunni
- Jurisprudence: Hanafi
- Creed: Maturidi

Muslim leader
- Influenced by: Hafiz Ismail Hakiu

Hafiz Ali Kraja or Hafiz Ali Tari (1900–1973) was an Albanian imam and Islamic educator.

== Biography ==
Kraja was born to a family from Kraja that was expelled after said Albanian-settled areas were ceded to Montenegro at the Congress of Berlin in 1878. He was known as Ali Tari (probably from Myftari or “son of Tari”) given the avoidance of surnames under the millet system of the Ottoman Empire. He went to kuttab and madrasa in Shkodër under the tutelage of Hafiz Ismail Hakiu, going on to enroll at Al-Azhar University in Cairo. Completing his degree in fiqh there in 1924, he was appointed by the Mufti of Shkodër as imam of the Lead Mosque upon his return. He later served at the Parrucë, Fushë Çela, and other local mosques. In 1931, he married Zenepja.

The Mufti of Tirana offered Kraja the post of Mufti of Durrës and the directorship of the magazine Zani i Naltë, but Kraja rejected the promotion, believing he was doing the most good where he was. In 1934, Kraja published the pamphlet "A duhet feja. A e pengon bashkimin kombtar?” (“Religion matters. Does it hinder national unity?”) with the local publishing house Ora e Shkodrës, considering the impact of recent changes to Albanian society.

When the parish of Shkodër decided to send its envoy to the Italian Parliament for the coronation of Victor Emmanuel III, Kraja did not attend. He was interned with his father and two brothers by the Italian army at Porto Palermo Castle in 1943. That September, after the Italian surrender, he addressed the faithful at Fushë Çela with the sermon, “Ç’ёshtё komunizmi dhe pasojat e tij pёr popullin shqiptar” (“What is communism and what does it mean for the Albanian people”).

As the partisans approached the Drin, Kraja brokered a truce between Sulçe Bushati and his rival Gjon Markagjoni and the Shkodër National Committee to fight off the ultimately successful communist takeover. He took advantage of an amnesty offer to avoid an initial death sentence, pleading it down by decision no. 213 on June 8, 1947, to 25 years of imprisonment, from whence he was released early after 18 years on October 12, 1965. His library was looted that year, and he stayed on self-imposed house arrest until his death in 1974.

== Family persecution ==
After his arrest, his family’s property was confiscated, and Zenepja and their children grew up in grave privation.
