= Bazaar Mosque, Gjirokastër =

Sunni mosque in Gjirokastër, Albania

Bazaar Mosque
- Xhamia e Pazarit
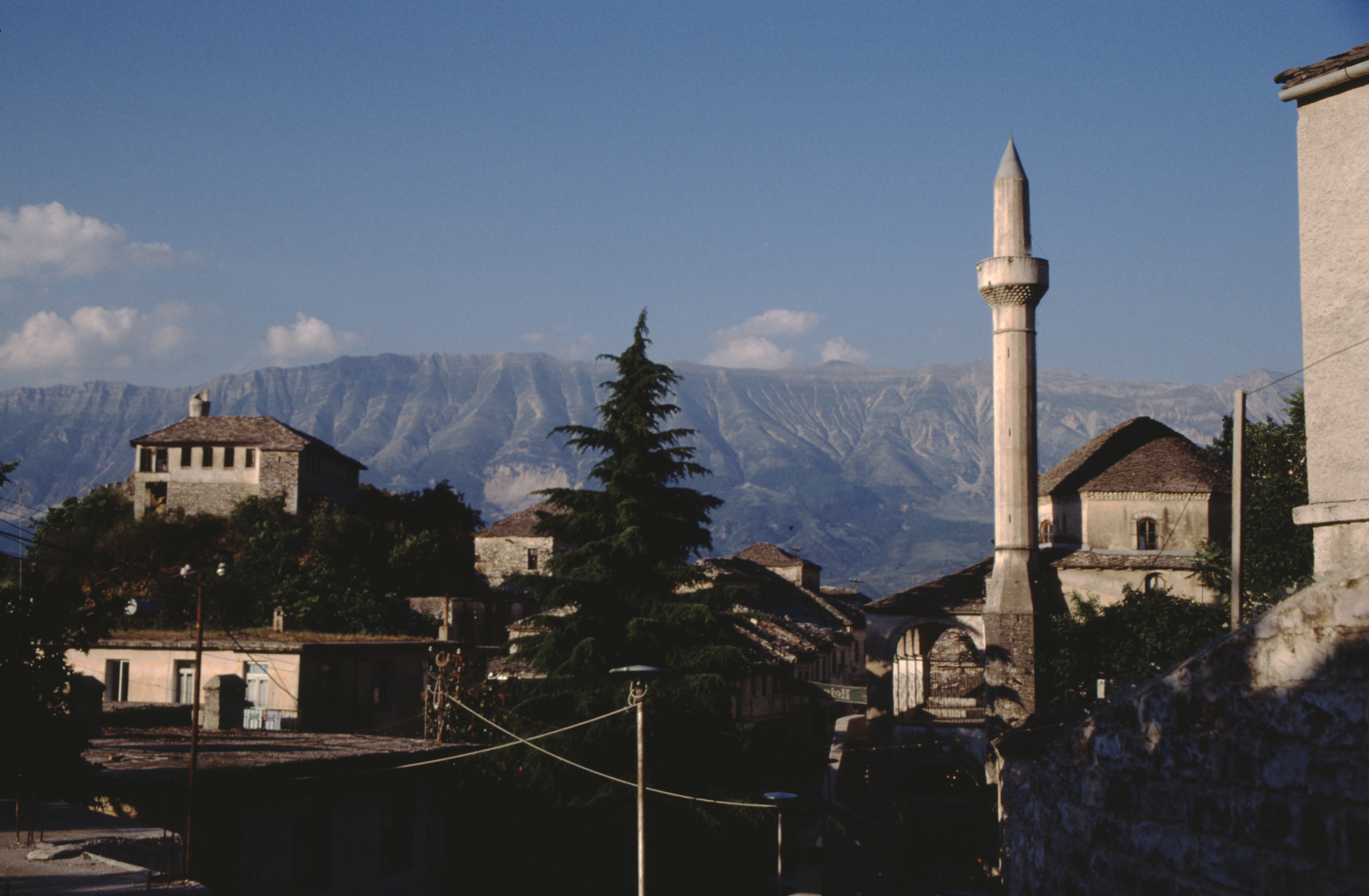
- The mosque in 1998

- Location of the mosque in Albania

Religion
- Affiliation: Sunni Islam
- Ecclesiastical or organizational status: Mosque
- Status: Active

Location
- Location: Gjirokastër
- Country: Albania
- Interactive map of Bazaar Mosque
- Coordinates: 40°4′26″N 20°8′17″E

Architecture
- Type: Islamic architecture
- Style: Ottoman
- Completed: 1757 CE

Cultural Monument of Albania
- Official name: Bazaar Mosque
- Designated: 1973
- Part of: Historic Centres of Berat and Gjirokastër

UNESCO World Heritage Site
- Official name: Historic Centres of Berat and Gjirokastër
- Criteria: Cultural: iii, iv
- Reference: 569
- Inscription: 2005 (29th Session)
- Extensions: 2008

The Bazaar Mosque (Albanian: Xhamia e Pazarit; Turkish: Pazar Camii), also known as the Memi Bey Mosque (Albanian: Xhamia e Memi Beut; Turkish: Memi Bey Camii), is a Sunni mosque located in Gjirokastër, Albania. The mosque was designated as a Cultural Monument of Albania in 1973; and forms part of the Historic Centres of Berat and Gjirokastër, designated as a UNESCO World Heritage Site in 2005.

== History ==
The Memi Bey mosque was built during the Ottoman Albanian period in 1757 and is located in the Old Bazaar neighbourhood. It is one of fifteen mosques originally built in the city during the Ottoman era, of which thirteen survived till the communist period.

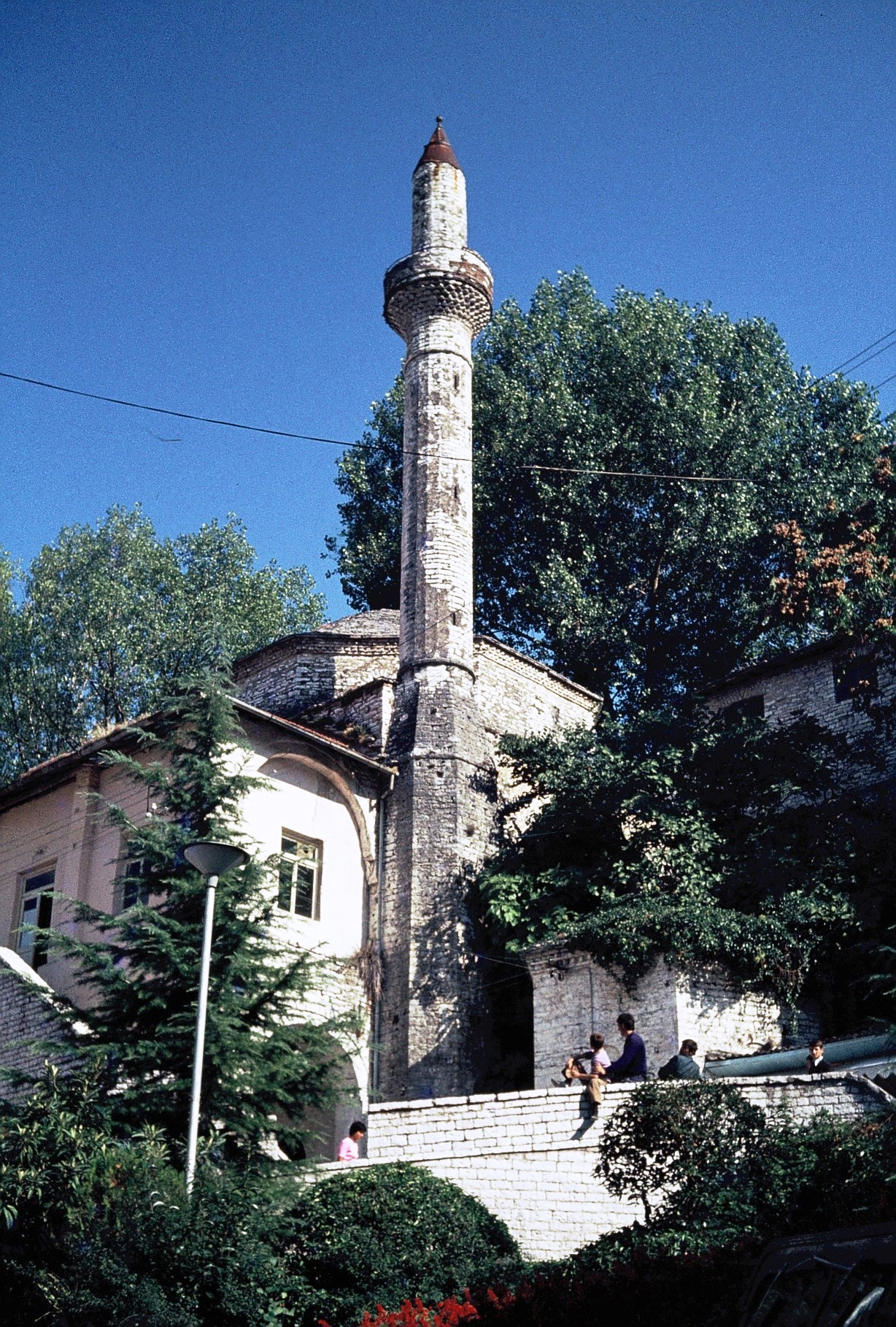
The closed and repurposed building in 1978

The mosque was originally designed to be located in the New Bazaar neighbourhood of Gjirokastër, as part of Memi Pasha's urban plan, that was built in the 17th century. It was, however, destroyed by fire in the following century, with the exception of the mosque.

The mosque was designated as a "Cultural Monument" (Monumente Kulturore) by the Albanian government in 1973, sparing its destruction by the totalitarian communist regime of Albania. The remaining twelve mosques were subsequently demolished. Because of a religion ban in Albania, the mosque was used as a training hall for circus acrobats who made use of the high domed ceilings to hang their trapezes.

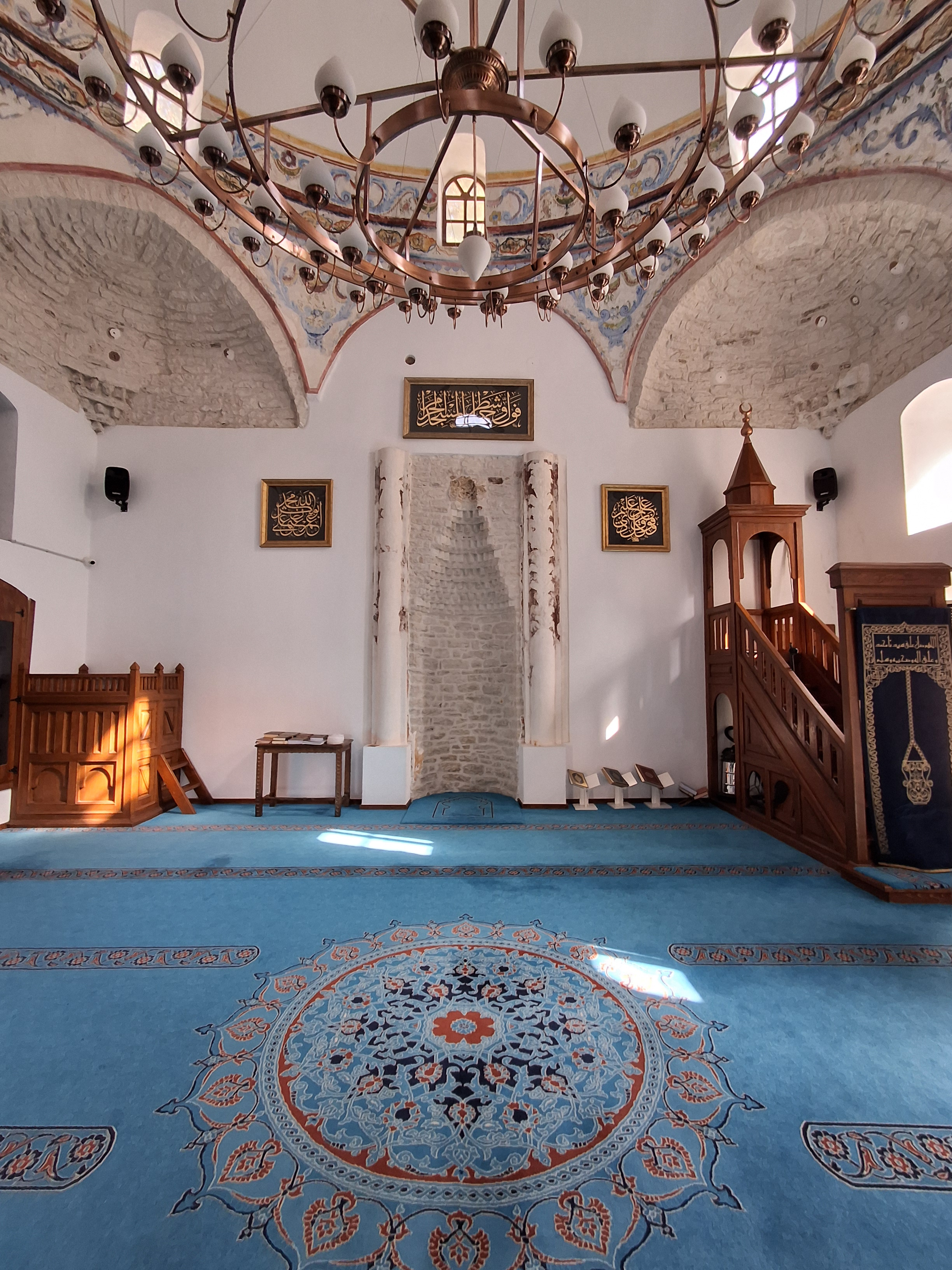
Antique Turkish frescoes and inscriptions inside the restored mosque in 2025

== Other structures ==
Nearby, the mosque is a two-story octagonal building, constructed in 1727. Although originally used as a Bektashi cemevi, it was closed down during the communist period. It is currently used as a madrasah.

== See also ==
- Islam in Albania
- List of mosques in Albania
