= List of mosques in Albania =

This is a list of mosques in Albania.

Approximately 740 mosques were destroyed in c. 1967 by the Communist dictatorship under Enver Hoxha, when state atheism was introduced. Only a small number of mosque have been restored.

== List of mosques ==
=== Current mosques ===
| Name | Image | Location | Built (CE) | Notes |
|---|---|---|---|---|
| King Mosque, Elbasan | | Elbasan, Elbasan County | 1485 | Desecrated in 1967; Restored in 1991; Also a Cultural Monument |
| King Mosque, Berat | | Berat, Berat County | 1492 | Also a Cultural Monument |
| Mirahori Mosque | | Korçë, Korçë County | 1494 | Desecrated in 1967; Restored in 1991 and 2014; Also a Cultural Monument |
| Fatih Mosque, Durrës | | Durrës, Durrës County | 1502 | Desecrated in 1967; Restored in 1991; Also a Cultural Monument |
| Bazaar Mosque | | Krujë, Durrës County | 1533 | Desecrated in 1967; Restored in 1991; Also a Cultural Monument |
| Muradie Mosque | | Vlorë, Vlorë County | 1542 | Also a Cultural Monument |
| Lead Mosque, Berat | | Berat, Berat County | 1554 | Also a Cultural Monument; Restored in 2014 |
| Allajbegi's Mosque | | Burim, Dibër County | 1578 | Also a Cultural Monument |
| Naziresha Mosque | | Elbasan, Elbasan County | 1599 | Also a Cultural Monument |
| Clock Mosque | | Peqin, Elbasan County | 1666 | Also a Cultural Monument |
| Hysen Pasha Mosque | | Berat, Berat County | 1670 | Partially desecrated in 1967; Restored in 1991; Also a Cultural Monument; Part of a World Heritage Site |
| Gjin Aleksi Mosque | | Delvinë, Vlorë County | 17th century | Also a Cultural Monument |
| Tanners' Mosque | | Tirana, Tirana County | 17th century | Sunni; Partially desecrated in 1967; Restored in 1990 |
| Kokonozi Mosque | | Tirana, Tirana County | 1750 | Profane use from 1966; Reopened in 1991 |
| Bazaar Mosque, Gjirokastër | | Gjirokastër, Gjirokastër County | 1757 | Sunni; Also a Cultural Monument; Part of a World Heritage Site |
| Lead Mosque, Shkodër | | Shkodër, Shkodër County | 1773 | Desecrated in 1967; Restored in 1991; Also a Cultural Monument |
| Et'hem Bey Mosque | | Tirana, Tirana County | 1821 | Sunni; Desecrated in 1967; Restored in 1991; Also a Cultural Monument |
| Bachelors' Mosque | | Berat, Berat County | 1828 | Also a Cultural Monument |
| Great Mosque of Durrës | | Durrës, Durrës County | 1931 | Also a Cultural Monument; Restored in 1993 |
| Ebu Beker Mosque | | Shkodër, Shkodër County | 1995 | Sunni; Capacity of 1,300 worshippers |
| Baitul Awal Mosque | | Tirana, Tirana County | 1995 | Ahmadiyya; Capacity of 2,500 worshippers |
| Kubelie Mosque | | Kavajë, Tirana County | 20th century | Earlier mosque destroyed in the 1970s; This mosque erected prior to 1995 |
| Fier Mosque | | Fier, Fier County | 2005 | Earlier mosque destroyed in 1967 |
| Parrucë Mosque | | Shkodër, Shkodër County | 2006 | 1937 mosque was destroyed in 1967 |
| Namazgah Mosque | | Tirana, Tirana County | 2024 | Sunni; Capacity of 10,000 worshippers; Largest mosque in the Balkans |

=== Former mosques ===
- White Mosque, Berat – established 1417; destroyed in the 19th century; now in ruins
- Selimije Mosque – established 1478 on the site of a 1st-century BCE church; destroyed in 1967; repurposed in the 1980s as a mausoleum and national monument
- Fethiye Mosque (Krujë) – established 1481; destroyed from 1937; now in ruins
- Red Mosque, Berat – established in the 15th century; now in ruins
- Hajji Bendo Mosque – established in the 16th century; destroyed in 1967; now in ruins
- Sulejman Pasha Mosque – established in 1614; destroyed in 1944
- Fatih Sultan Mehmet Mosque – established in 1685 on the site of a 13th-century church; destroyed in 1967; now in ruins
- Teqe Mosque – established 1733; destroyed in 1967; now in ruins
- Telelka Mosque – established in the 18th century; destroyed in 1967; now in partial ruins
- Castle Mosque, Lezhë – established year unknown; now in ruins

== See also ==
- Islam in Albania
- Lists of mosques
