= King Mosque =

King Mosque may refer to:

- King Mosque, Berat, in Berat, Albania
- King Mosque, Elbasan, in Elbasan, Albania
