= Great Mosque of Durrës =

Mosque in Durrës, Albania

- Xhamia e Madhe e Durrësit
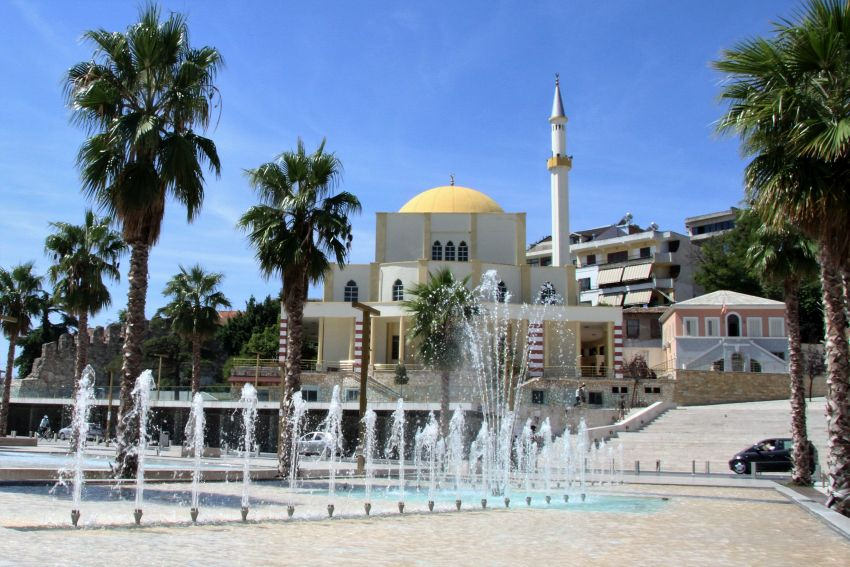
- The mosque in 2016

- Location of the mosque in Albania

Religion
- Affiliation: Islam
- Ecclesiastical or organizational status: Mosque: (1931–1967); (since 1993– )
- Status: Active

Location
- Location: Durrës, Durrës County
- Country: Albania
- Interactive map of Great Mosque of Durrës
- Coordinates: 41°18′48″N 19°26′44″E

Architecture
- Type: Islamic architecture
- Style: Ottoman
- Completed: 1931 CE

Specifications
- Dome: 1
- Minaret: 1 (replaced)

Cultural Monument of Albania
- Official name: Great Mosque of Durrës

The Great Mosque of Durrës (Albanian: Xhamia e Madhe), also called the New Mosque (Xhamia e Re) and also the Grand Mosque, (Note: The term Grand mosque is used in order to distinguish it from the Ottoman-era Fatih Mosque, called the Little mosque.) is a mosque built during the era of the Albanian Kingdom and located in the port-town of Durrës, in the Durrës County of Albania. The mosque is designated as a Cultural Monument of Albania.

== Overview ==
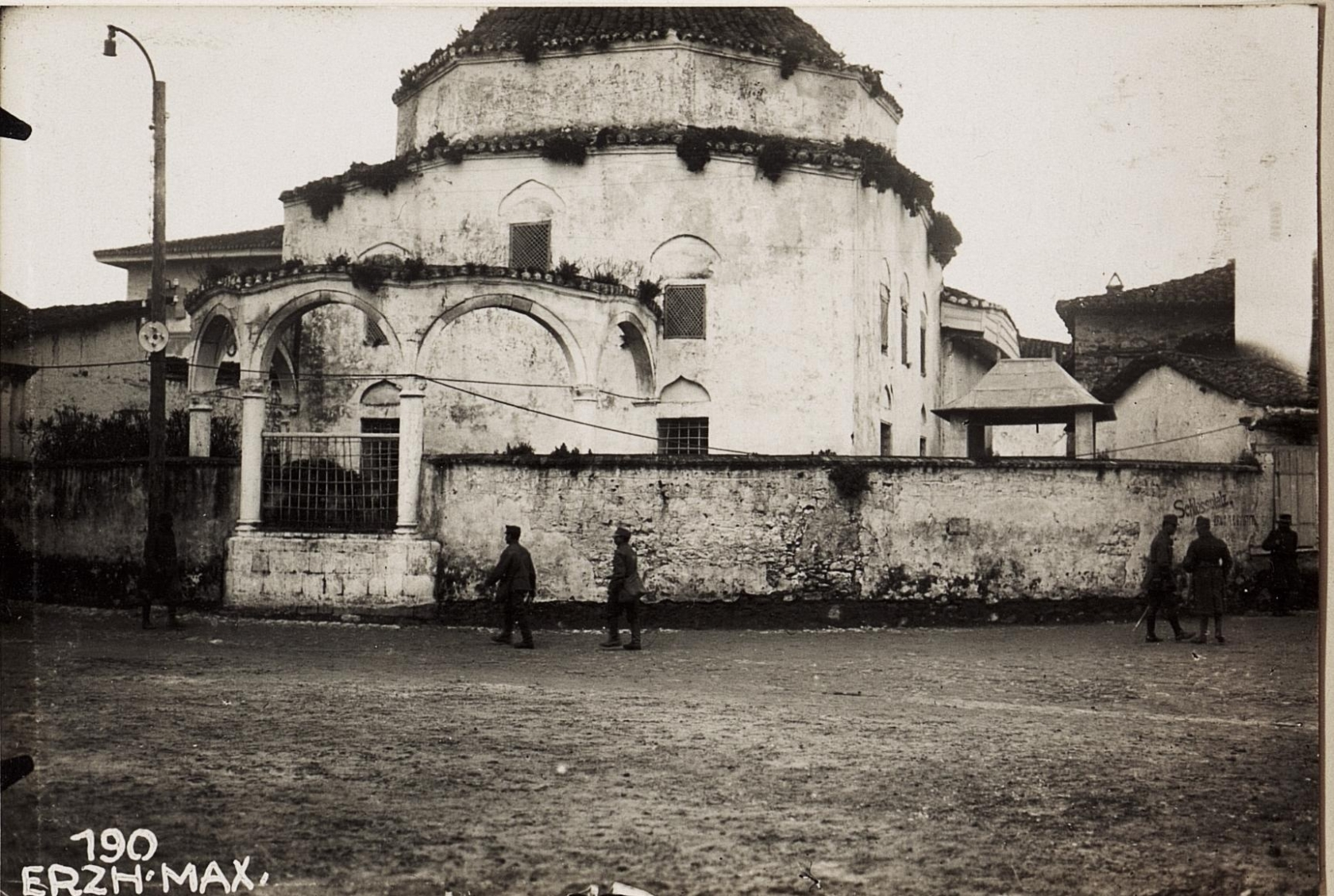
The old Ottoman mosque before 1931

The mosque was built in 1931 under the Kingdomship of King Ahmed Zogu on the site of an older mosque from Ottoman times. By the day of its opening, it was the largest mosque in Albania. The architects were Italian as the result of an Italian-Albanian cooperation. The goal of the architecture of the building was to have influence from Islamic tradition while also incorporating Durrës-style columns. When the mosque was completed, there was a celebration which included many foreign delegations.

Alongside other houses of worship during the Communist rule of Enver Hoxha, the mosque was closed in 1967 and its minaret was destroyed. Most other mosques of the Ottoman era were destroyed. The mosque was subsequently used for profane purposes, as a youth centre. The building was damaged by an earthquake in 1979.

With the help of the International Islamic Relief Organization of the Muslim World League, the mosque was reopened again in 1993.

== See also ==
- Islam in Albania
- Freedom of religion in Albania
- List of mosques in Albania
