= King Mosque, Berat =

Mosque in Berat City, Berat County, Albania

King Mosque
- Xhamia e Mbretit
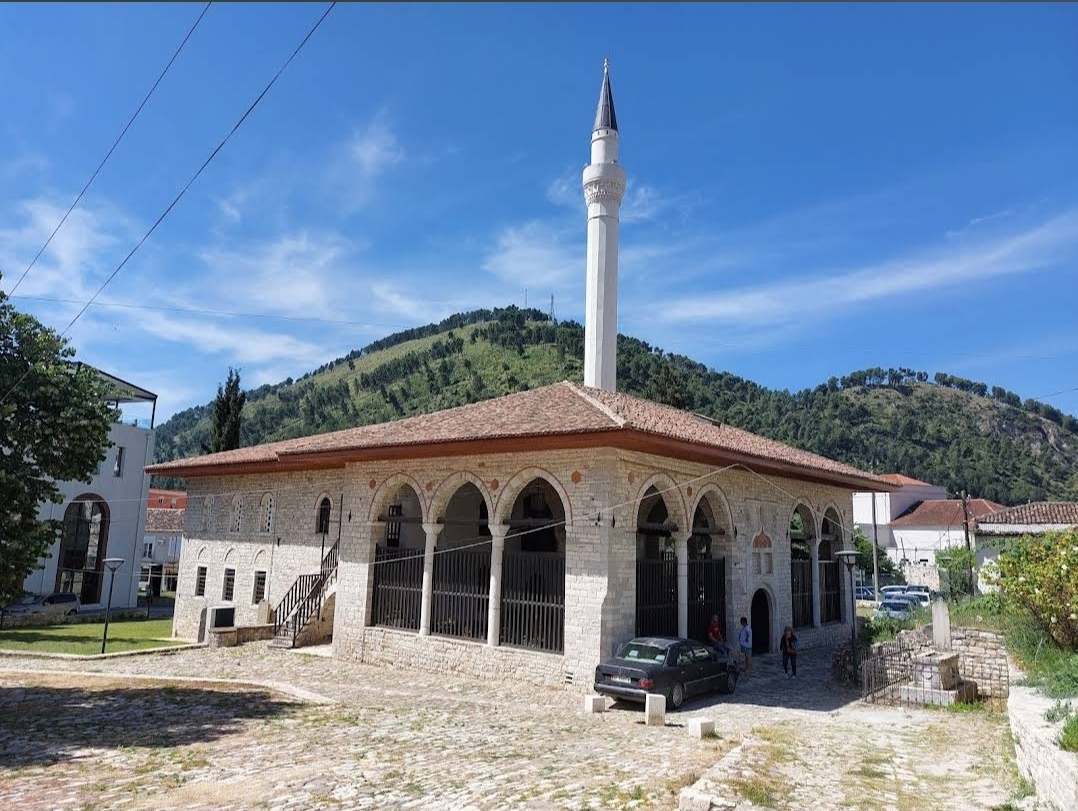
- King Mosque, Berat in 2024

- Location of the mosque in Albania

Religion
- Affiliation: Islam
- Ecclesiastical or organisational status: Mosque
- Status: Active

Location
- Location: Berat, Berat County
- Country: Albania
- Interactive map of King Mosque
- Coordinates: 40°42′20″N 19°57′08″E

Architecture
- Type: Islamic architecture
- Style: Ottoman
- Founder: Bayezid II
- Completed: 1492 CE

Cultural Monument of Albania
- Official name: King Mosque, Berat
- Designated: 1948
- Reference no.: BR462

The King Mosque (Albanian: Xhamia e Mbretit or Xhamia e Hynqarit), also known as the Sultan's Mosque (Xhamia e Sulltanit) or Sultan Bayezid Mosque, is a mosque located in Berat City, Berat County, Albania. Completed in 1492 CE, the mosque was designated as a Cultural Monument of Albania in 1948 and forms part of the Historic Centres of Berat and Gjirokastër, designated as a UNESCO World Heritage Site in 2005.

== Overview ==
The mosque in was first built in 1492, but it was almost completely destroyed during the Ottoman campaign against the revolts of 1830–31. Commander Reshid Mehmed Pasha, whose artillery caused the damage, had the mosque rebuilt from the ground up, following older local architectural traditions. The result is one of Albania’s largest mosques, featuring a portico larger than the prayer hall and an innovative system of ten shallow domes with octagonal wooden inlays, richly decorated with geometric and calligraphic designs, including a band listing the 99 Names of Allah. A women’s gallery on the north side enhances the hall’s spatial character. During the Communist dictatorship under Enver Hoxha, in 1967 the portico was altered and the minaret demolished, but both were later restored according to the original plans.

== Gallery ==
Ceiling of the mosque

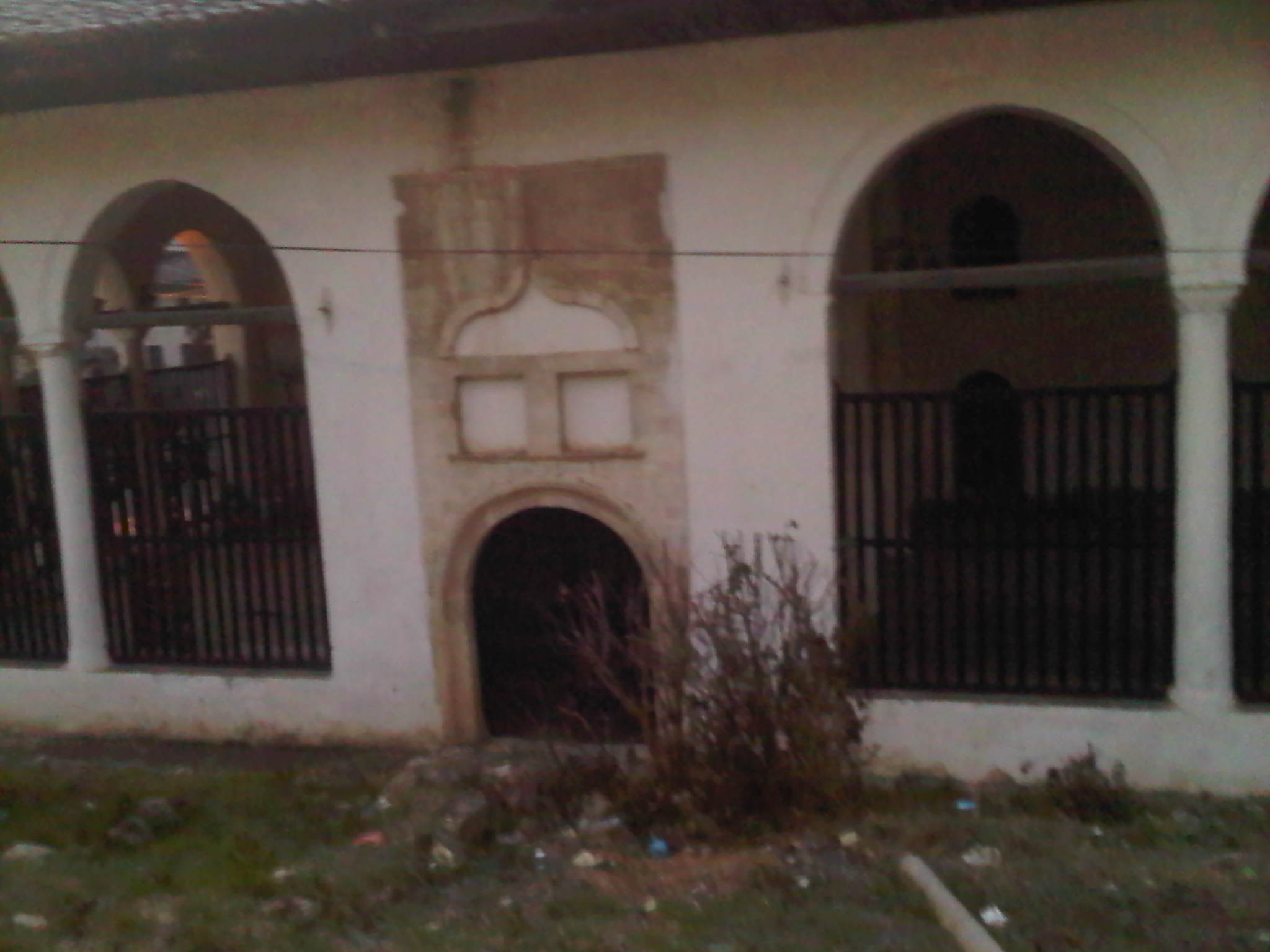
Southern part of the mosque

== See also ==
- Islam in Albania
- List of mosques in Albania
- List of Religious Cultural Monuments of Albania
