= King Mosque, Elbasan =

Mosque in Elbasan City, Elbasan County, Albania

King Mosque
- Xhamia e Mbretit
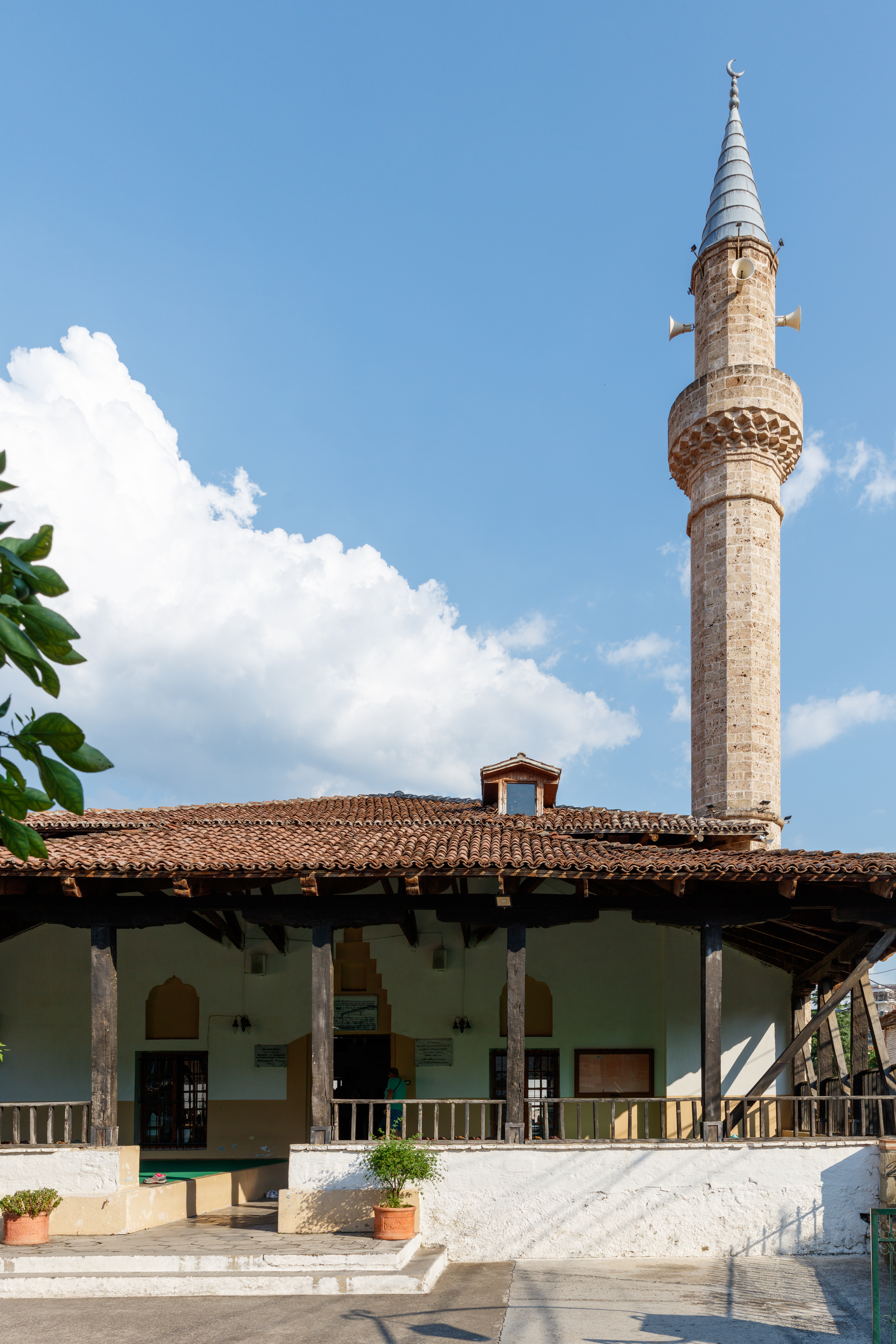
- The rebuilt minaret

- Location of the mosque in Albania

Religion
- Affiliation: Islam
- Ecclesiastical or organizational status: Mosque: (c. 1485–1967); (since 1991– )
- Status: Active

Location
- Location: Elbasan Castle, Elbasan, Elbasan County
- Country: Albania
- Interactive map of King Mosque
- Coordinates: 41°6′43″N 20°4′45″E

Architecture
- Type: Islamic architecture
- Style: Ottoman
- Founder: Bayezid II
- Groundbreaking: 1492 CE
- Completed: 1502 CE

Specifications
- Minaret: 1 (rebuilt in 2013)
- Minaret height: 14 m (46 ft)

Cultural Monument of Albania
- Official name: Sultan Bayezid Mosque, Elbasa
- Designated: 1948
- Reference no.: 12175

The King Mosque (Albanian: Xhamia e Mbretit or Xhamia e Hynqarit; Turkish: Hünkâr Camii) also known as the Sultan Bayezid Mosque (Xhamia e Sulltan Bajazitit) is a mosque, located within Elbasan Castle, in the town of Elbasan, in the Elbasan County of Albania. The mosque was designated as a Cultural Monument of Albania in 1948.

== Overview ==
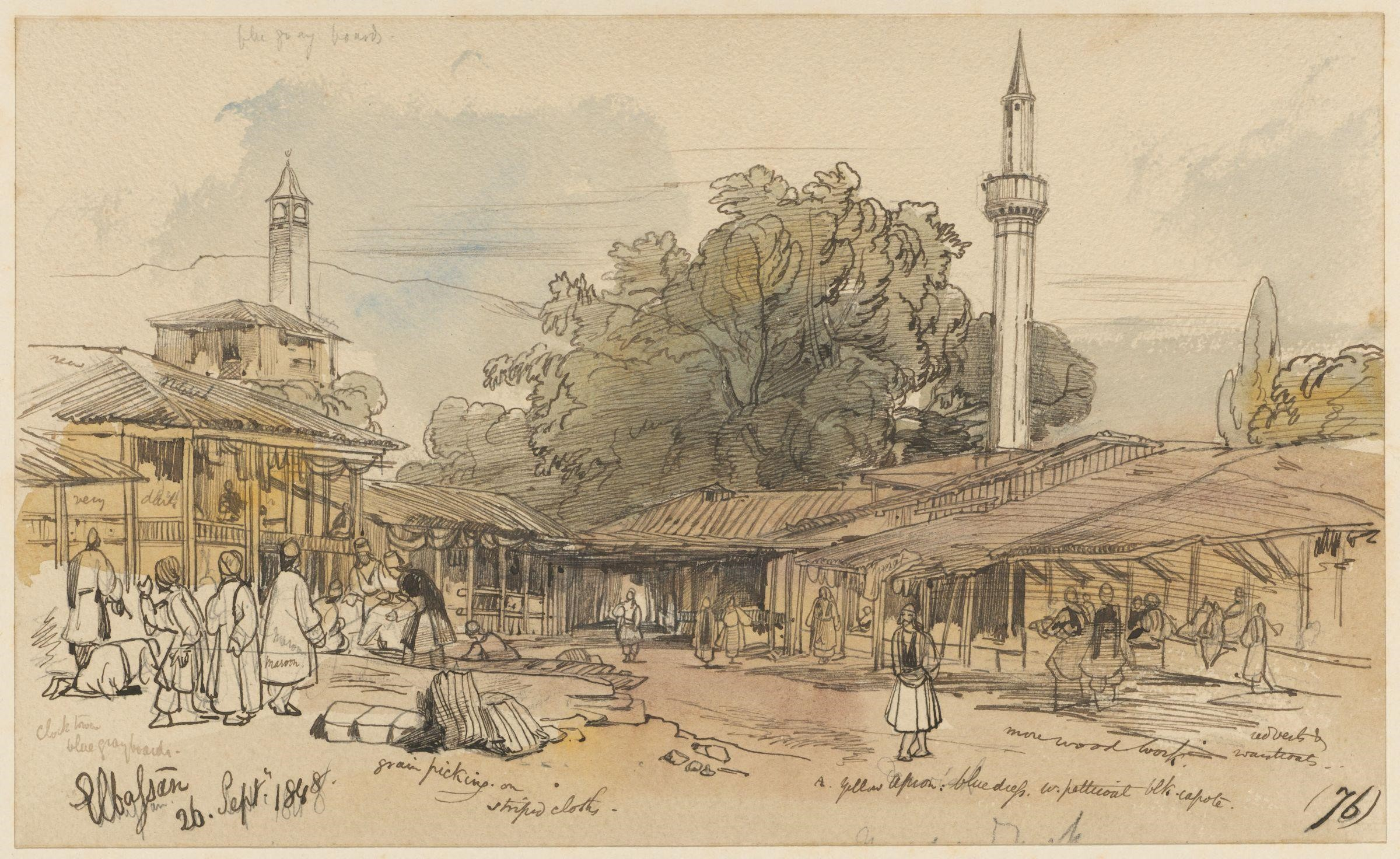
Either the Mbret mosque or the Pasha's mosque in 1848 (right)

The mosque was built by the Ottoman Sultan Bayazid II between 1492 and 1502; (Note: It was also claimed to be built between 1482 and 1485.) and was named in honour of the Ottoman Sultan Mehmet II. It is one of the oldest active mosques in Albania, after the Fatih Mosque in Durrës, established in 1466 CE.

The mosque consists of a porch with a tiled roof and a prayer hall that is c. 12 by 12 metres (39 ft × 39 ft), separated in two by a wooden portico of three pillars. During the Communist rule of Enver Hoxha, the building was converted into a political education center in 1967. Its 14-metre-high (46 ft) minaret, that was partially destroyed in 1979, was rebuilt in 2013.

== Gallery ==
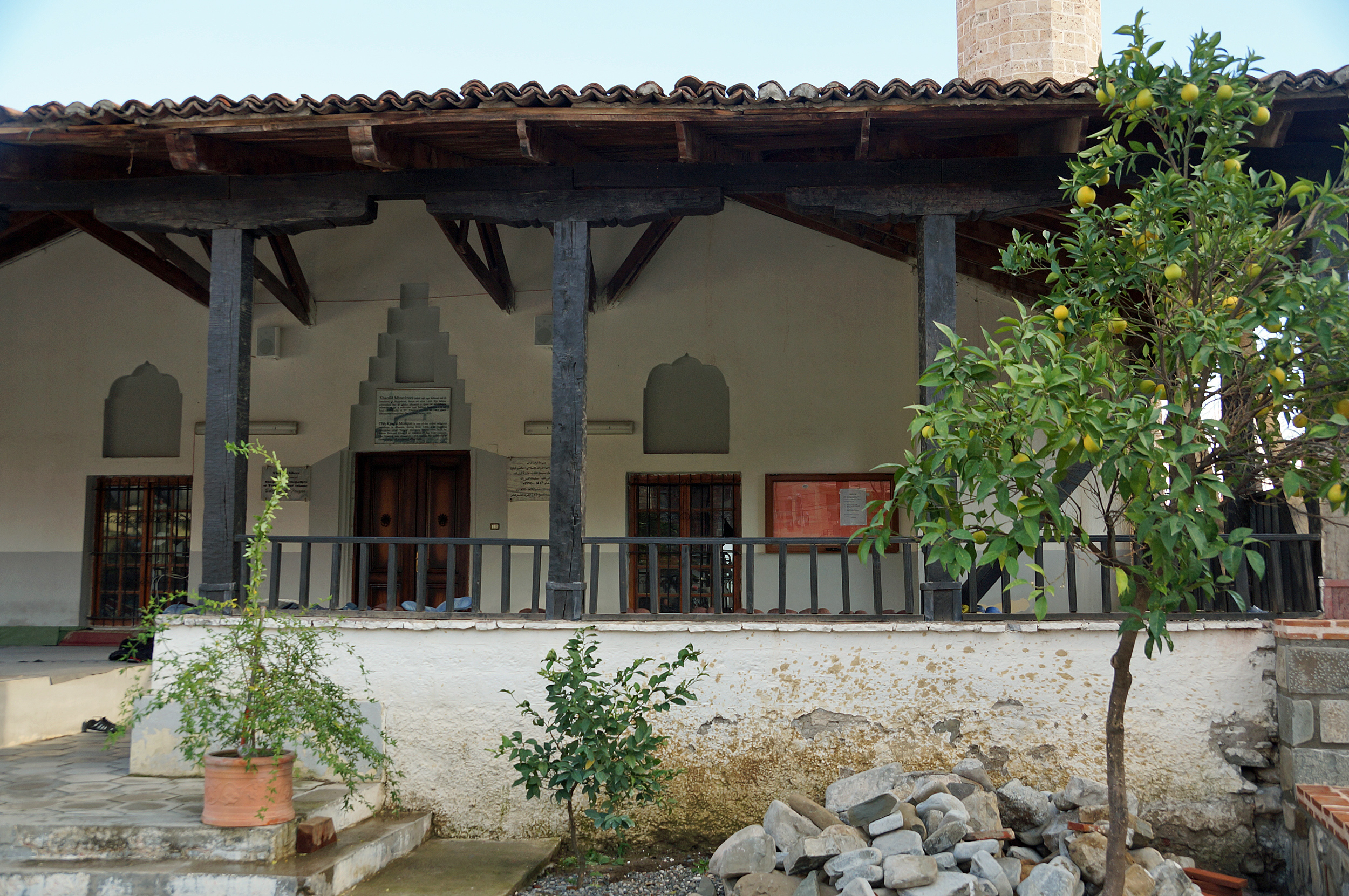
Portico and entrance in 2013, after restoration

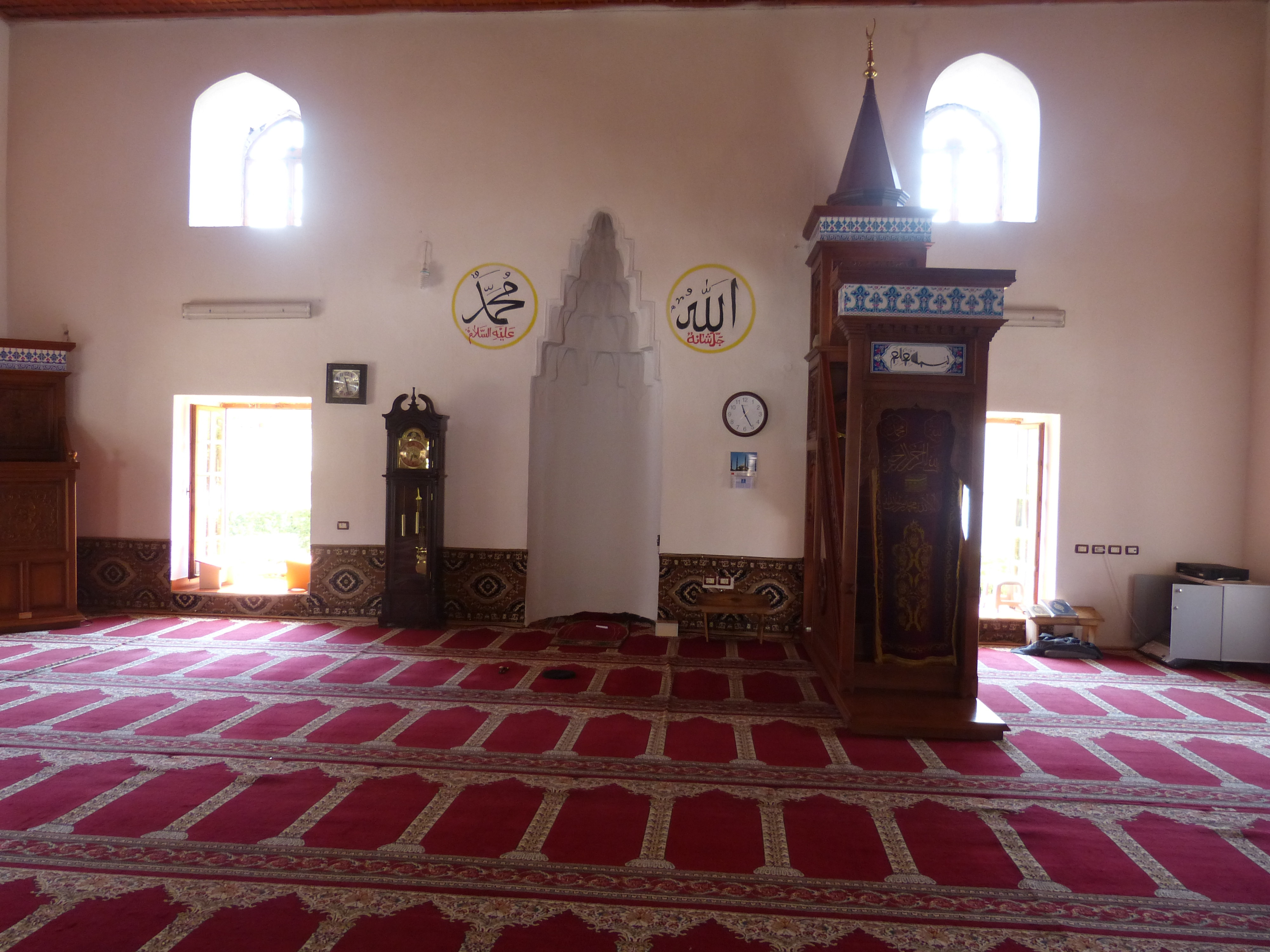
The mosque interior

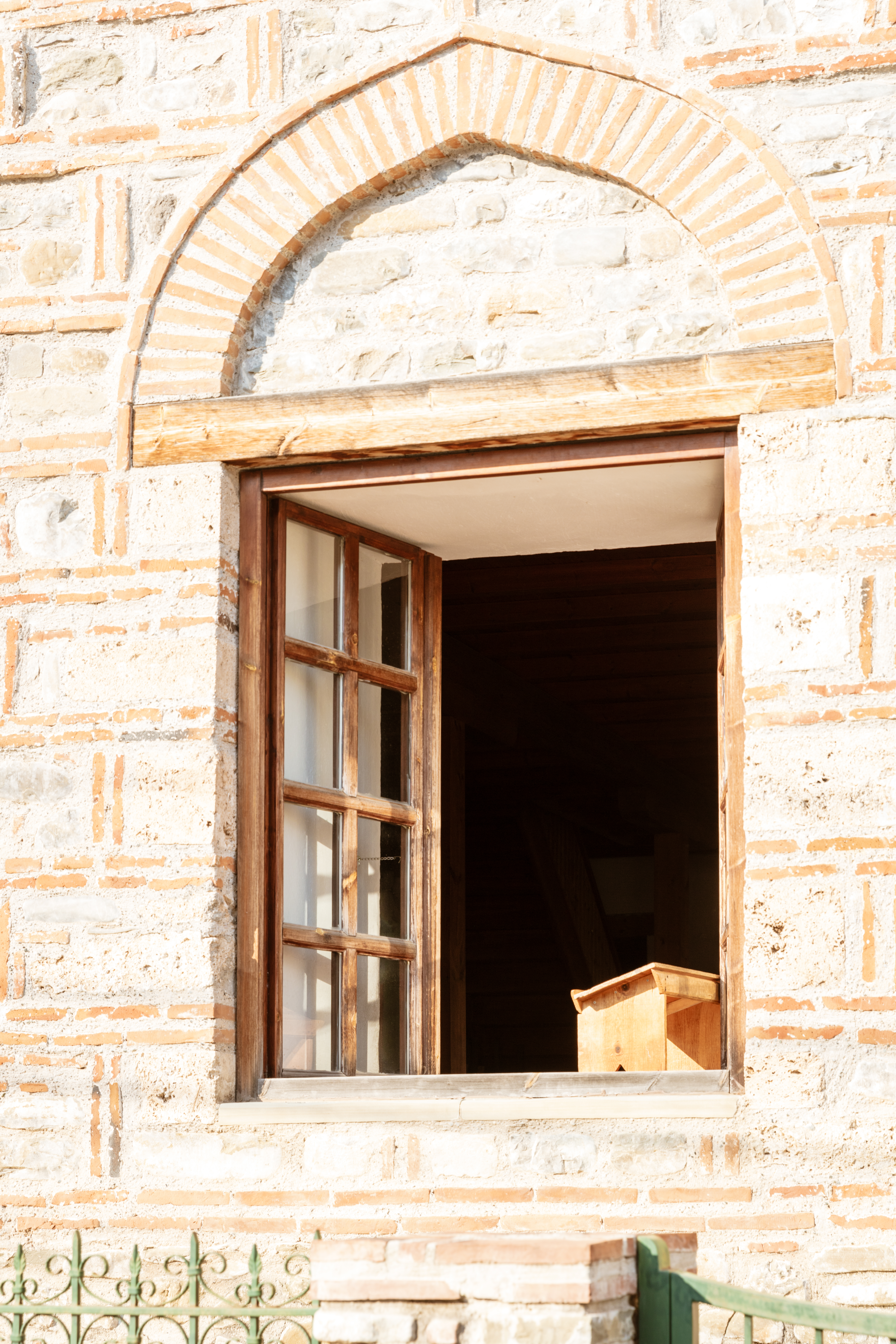
An Ottoman-style mosque window, in 2023

== See also ==
- Islam in Albania
- List of mosques in Albania
- List of religious cultural monuments of Albania
- List of the oldest mosques in Central and Eastern Europe
