= Allajbegi's Mosque =

Mosque in Maqellarë, Dibër County, Albania

- Xhamia e Allajbegisë
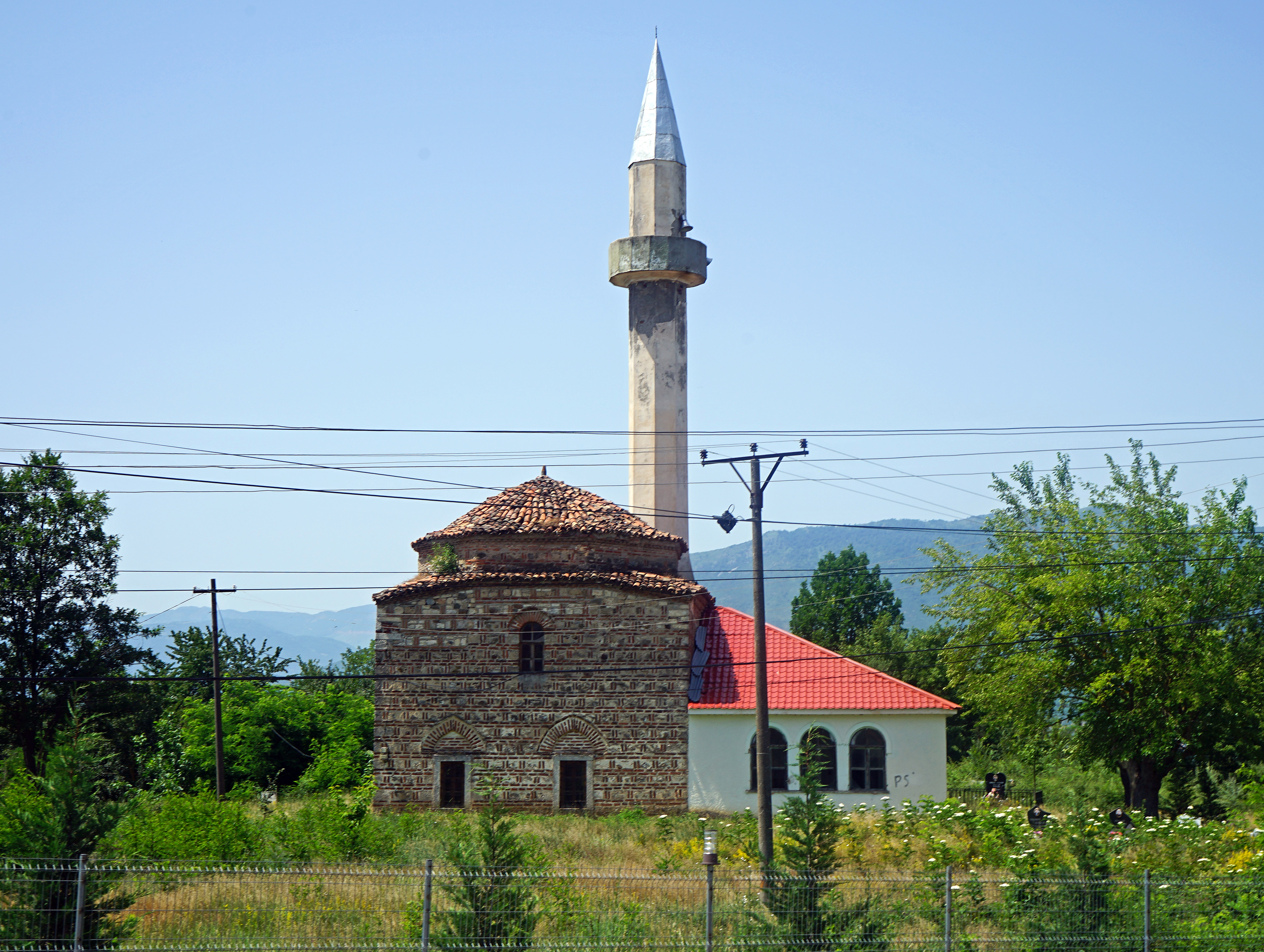

- Location of the mosque in Albania

Religion
- Affiliation: Islam
- Ecclesiastical or organizational status: Mosque
- Status: Active

Location
- Location: Burim, Dibër County
- Country: Albania
- Interactive map of Allajbegi's Mosque
- Coordinates: 41°34′42″N 20°27′57″E

Architecture
- Type: Islamic architecture
- Completed: 1578 CE

Specifications
- Dome: 1
- Minaret: 1

Cultural Monument of Albania
- Official name: The Mosque of Allajbegise, Burim, Diber
- Designated: 1970
- Reference no.: 8

The Allajbegi's Mosque (Albanian: Xhamia e Allajbegisë) is a mosque located in Burim (Allajbegi), in the Dibër County of Albania. Completed before 1578 CE, the mosque was designated a Cultural Monument of Albania in 1970.

== See also ==
- List of mosques in Albania
- Islam in Albania
