= Gjin Aleksi Mosque =

Mosque near Delvinë, Vlorë County, Albania

- Xhamia e Gjin Aleksit
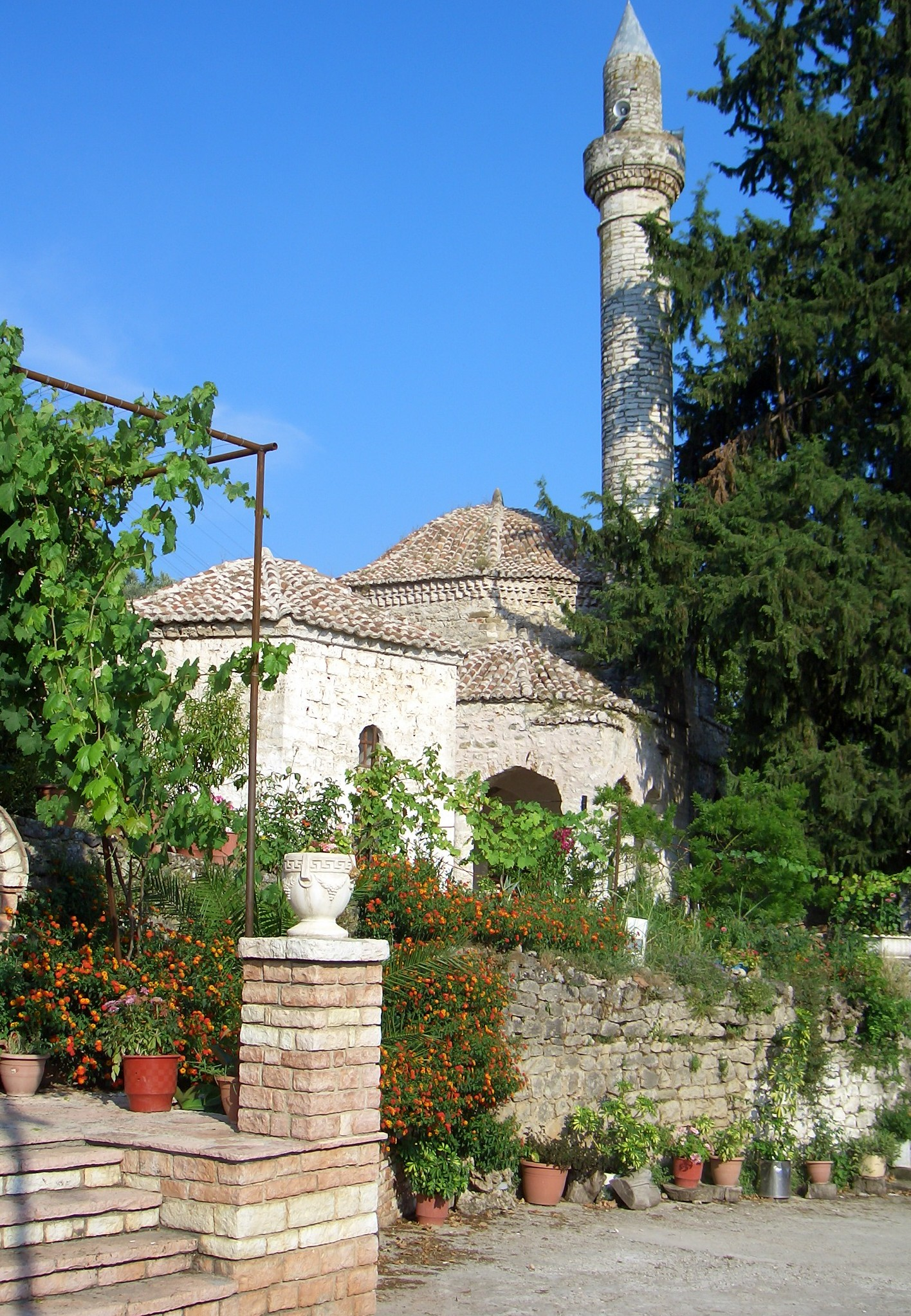
- The mosque in 2010

- Location of the mosque in Albania

Religion
- Affiliation: Islam
- Ecclesiastical or organizational status: Mosque
- Status: Active

Location
- Location: Rusan near Delvinë, Vlorë County
- Country: Albania
- Interactive map of Gjin Aleksi Mosque
- Coordinates: 39°57′06″N 20°04′35″E

Architecture
- Type: Islamic architecture
- Style: Ottoman
- Completed: 17th century CE
- Minaret: 1

Cultural Monument of Albania
- Official name: Gjin Aleksi Mosque

The Gjin Aleksi Mosque (Albanian: Xhamia e Gjin Aleksit) is a mosque, located in the village of Rusan, near Delvinë, in the Vlorë County of Albania. Completed during the 17th century CE, the mosque was designated as a Cultural Monument of Albania. The mosque is distinguished for the high quality of acoustics, obtained through casks that are strategically placed in holes in the walls.

== Description ==
The mosque consists of a columned prayer hall with tile-covered domes, a minaret which does not have a roof anymore and a gallery for the muezzin. There is also a gallery for women on the side of the entrance. The hall has a frieze with the names of God in Islam. Due to walls covered with ceramics, the mosque has good acoustics.

== History ==
Evliya Çelebi describes Gjin Aleksi as a quarter of Delvina. The mosque was likely built in the first half of the 17th century. It seems that later it was turned into a center of the Bektashi order. Bektashi babas (clergymen) were originally buried in the hexagonal turrets, one of which directly saw through the window to the mihrab in the east wall. The turrets serve as classrooms and prayer rooms.

== See also ==
- List of mosques in Albania
- Islam in Albania
- List of Religious Cultural Monuments of Albania
