= Bachelors' Mosque =

Mosque in Berat City, Berat County, Albania

- Xhamia e Beqarëve
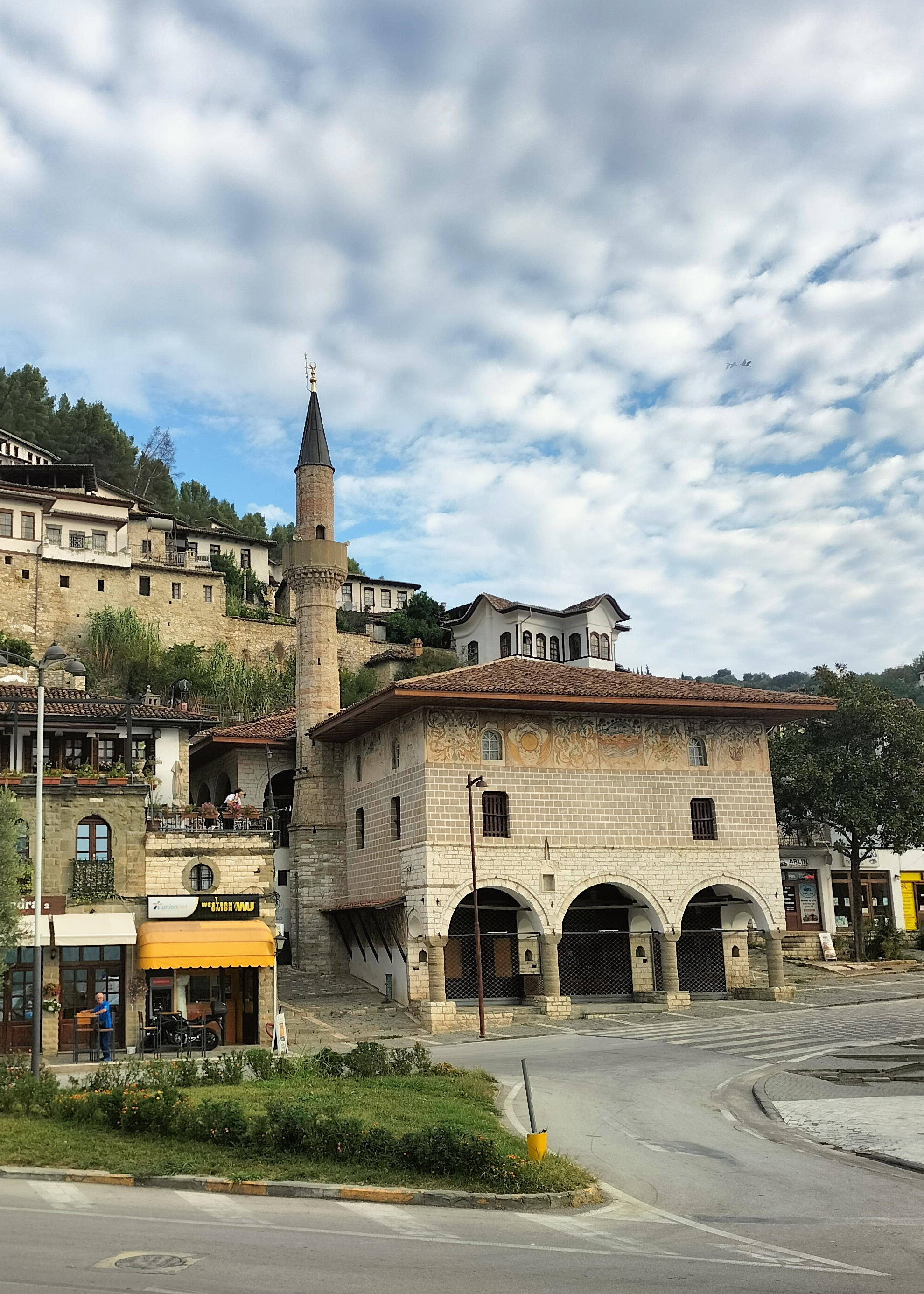

- Location of the mosque in Albania

Religion
- Affiliation: Islam
- Ecclesiastical or organizational status: Mosque
- Status: Active

Location
- Location: Berat, Berat County
- Country: Albania
- Interactive map of Bachelors' Mosque
- Coordinates: 40°42′17″N 19°57′00″E

Architecture
- Type: Islamic architecture
- Style: Ottoman
- Completed: 1828 CE
- Minaret: 1

Cultural Monument of Albania
- Official name: Bachelor’s Mosque, Berat
- Designated: 1961
- Reference no.: BR460

The Bachelors' Mosque (Albanian: Xhamia e Beqarëve), formerly known as the Sylejman Pasha Mosque (Albanian: Xhamia e Sylejman Pashës), is a mosque located in Berat City, Berat County, Albania. Completed in 1828 CE during the Ottoman era, the mosque was designated as a Cultural Monument of Albania in 1961 and forms part of the Historic Centres of Berat and Gjirokastër, designated as a UNESCO World Heritage Site in 2005.

The mosque is located in the lower Mangalem neighborhood. It has two floors and arcades on three sides of it. The minaret of the mosque is low. The paintings inside the mosque were dated in 1927–1928. Since the times of the Communist dictatorship under Enver Hoxha, the portico (hajati) of the mosque has been used as a store for women's underwear which can be seen as a disgrace to Islam.

== See also ==
- Islam in Albania
- List of mosques in Albania
- List of Religious Cultural Monuments of Albania
- Albanian uprisings in the Ottoman Empire
