= Fier Mosque =

Mosque in Fier, Albania

- Xhamia e Fierit
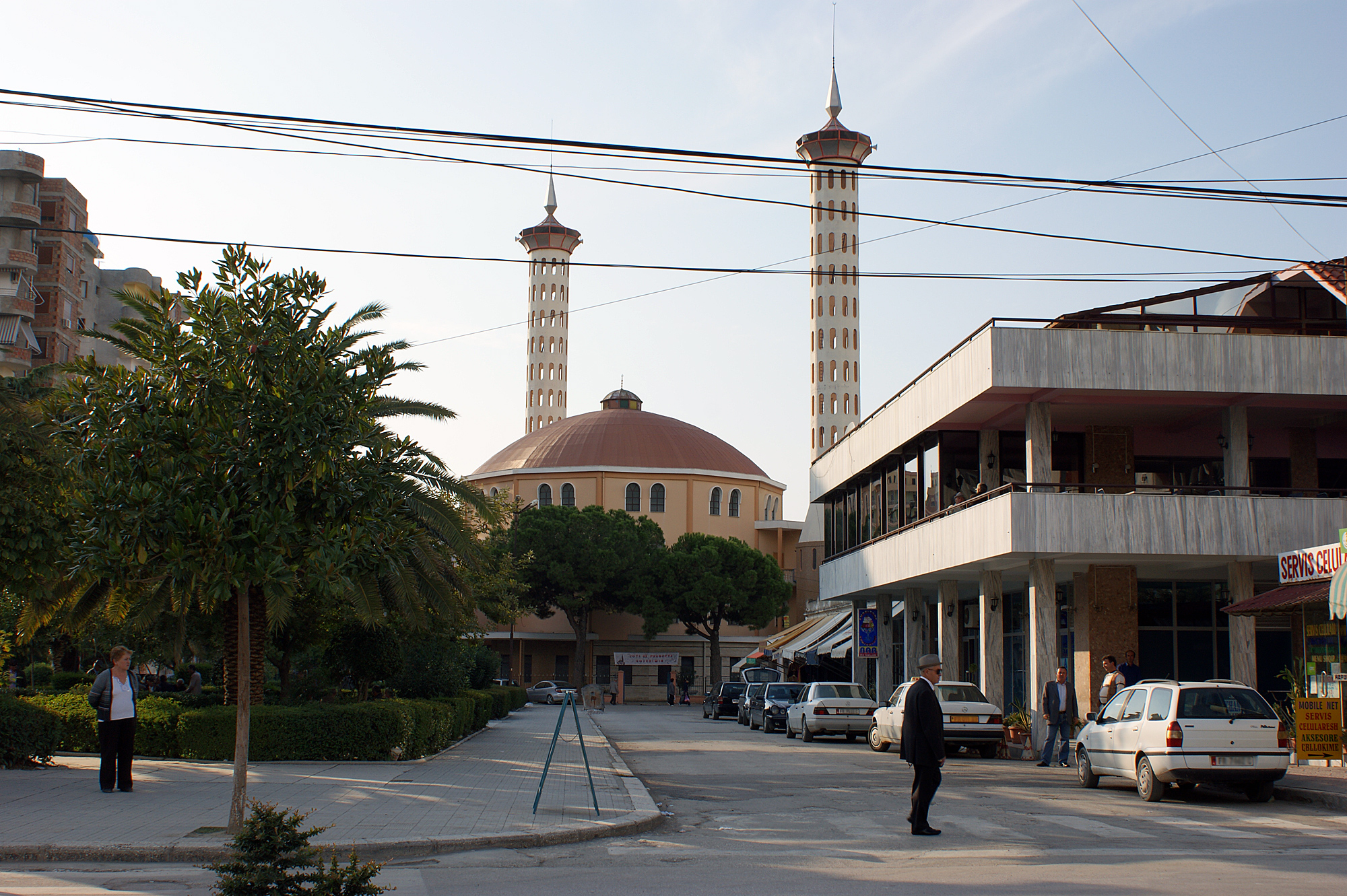
- The reconstructed mosque, in 2008

- Location of the mosque in Albania

Religion
- Affiliation: Islam
- Ecclesiastical or organizational status: Mosque
- Status: Active

Location
- Location: Fier, Fier County
- Country: Albania
- Interactive map of Fier Mosque
- Coordinates: 40°43′34″N 19°33′26″E

Architecture
- Type: Islamic architecture
- Style: Ottoman
- Completed: 2005 (rebuilt)

Specifications
- Dome: 1
- Minaret: 2

The Fier Mosque, officially the Mosque of Fier (Albanian: Xhamia e Fierit), is a mosque located in the town of Fier, in Fier County, Albania.

Destroyed alongside other houses of worship during the Communist rule of Enver Hoxha, the mosque was rebuilt in 2005, in the Ottoman architectural style. It is one of the largest mosques in Albania and is a local visitors' attraction.

An Ottoman-era mosque is also located in another part of the town of Fier.

== See also ==
- Islam in Albania
- List of mosques in Albania
