= Lead Mosque, Shkodër =

Mosque in Shkodër City, Shkodër County, Albania

Lead Mosque
- Xhamia e Plumbit
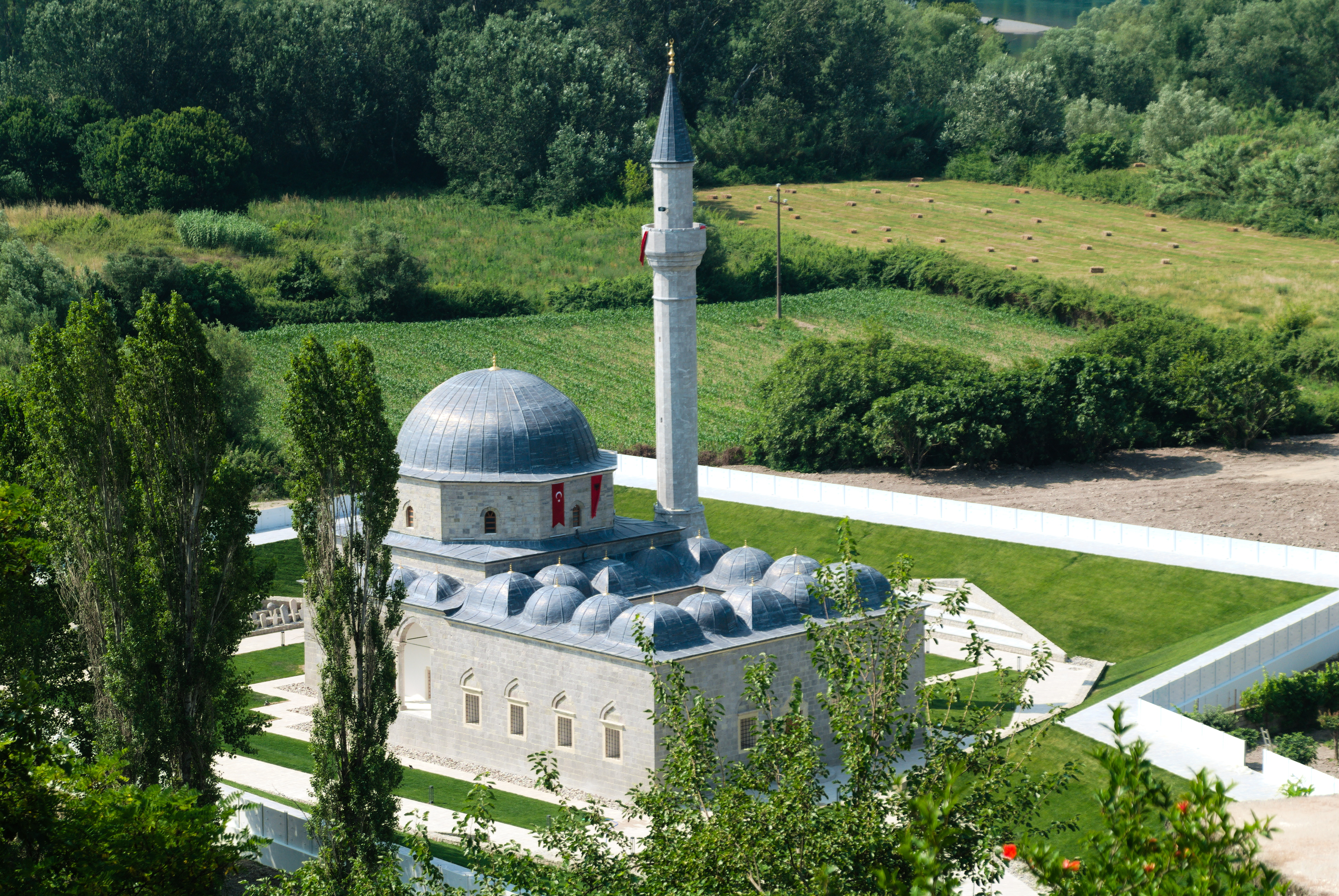
- The restored mosque in 2025

- Location of the mosque in Albania

Religion
- Affiliation: Islam
- Ecclesiastical or organisational status: Mosque: (1773 CE–1967); (since 1990– )
- Status: Active

Location
- Location: Shkodër
- Country: Albania
- Interactive map of Lead Mosque
- Coordinates: 42°02′47″N 19°29′58″E

Architecture
- Type: Islamic architecture
- Style: Ottoman
- Founder: Mehmed Bushati
- Completed: 1773 CE

Specifications
- Domes: 1 (main); many (others)
- Minaret: 1

Cultural Monument of Albania
- Official name: Lead Mosque, Shkodër
- Designated: 1948

The Lead Mosque (Albanian: Xhamia e Plumbit), known as the Mosque of Mehmet Bushati (Albanian: Xhamia e Mehmet Bushatit), is a mosque built in 1773 in Shkodër, northwestern Albania. The cupolas of the mosque were covered in lead; hence its name. The mosque was designated as a Cultural Monument of Albania in 1948.

== History ==
The Lead Mosque was built in 1773 CE by the Albanian pasha Mehmed Bushati of the noble Bushati family, who was vizier of Pashalik of Scutari at the time. Through this act, he intended to give the feeling of the capital to his city of birth. It is said that the mosque was built on land owned by the Catholic Church.

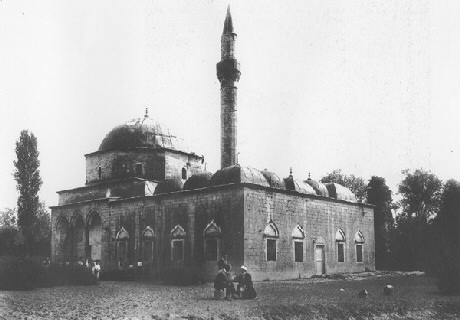
The mosque with its original stone minaret until 1967

Mehmed Bushati was involved with the construction and stones were incised under his patronage. Almost every day, he followed the progress of the works on site, leaving the Rozafa Castle, his residence.

The first Imam of the mosque was Haxhi Ahmet Misria, who was of Egyptian origin. He came to Albania after the contacts he had with Mehmed Bushati. After him, other Imams served and also took care of the mosque.

=== Damage ===
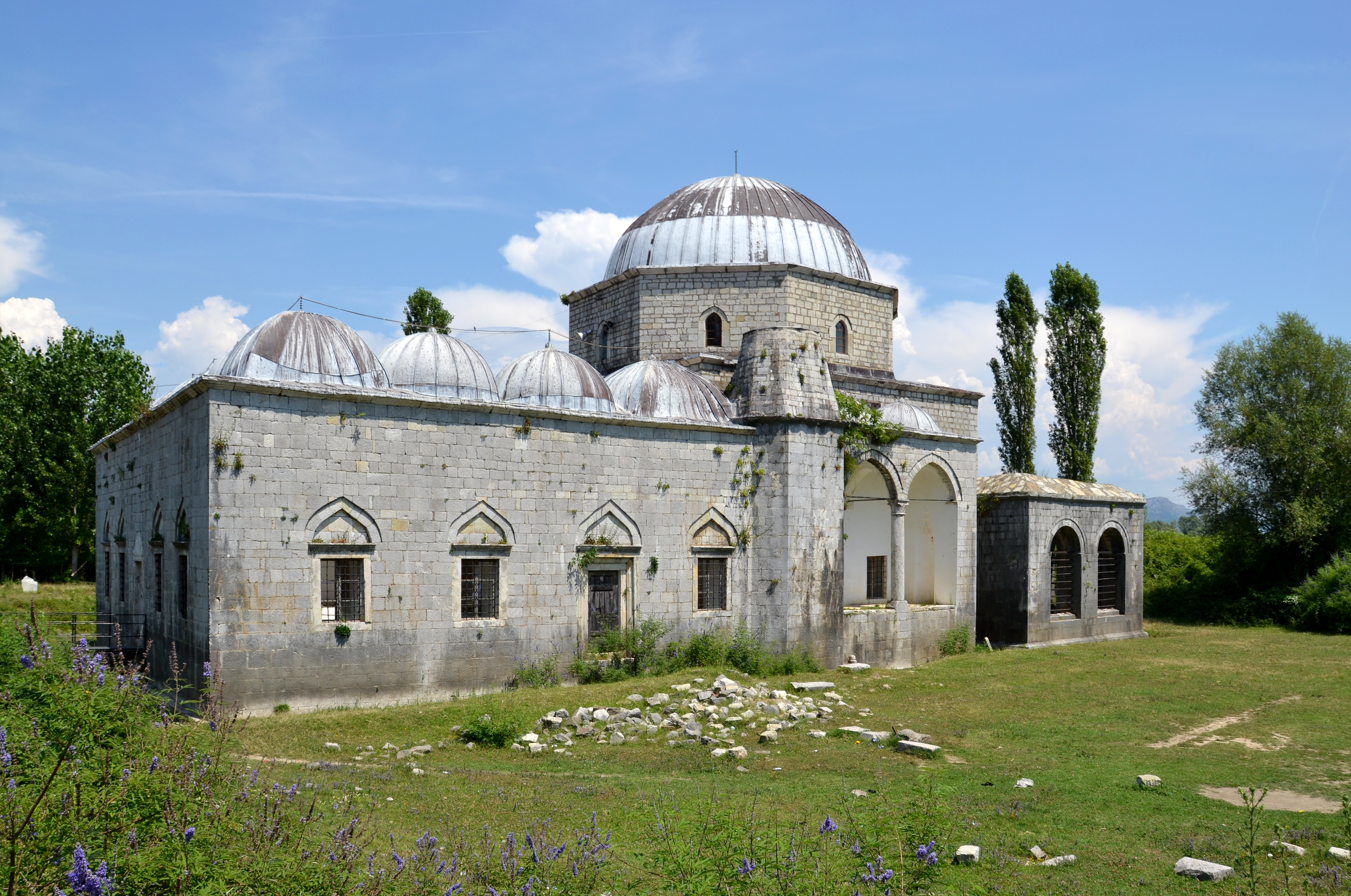
The neglected historic building with its minaret destroyed during Communist times

During the 1900s, the mosque was damaged and the lead that covered the cupolas was gradually stolen. In 1916, the remaining lead was removed by the Austrian army during the Austrian rule in Albania.

In 1920, Xhelal Bushati, a descendant of Mehmed Bushati, reconstructed the mosque's minaret. The minaret was subsequently destroyed in 1967. The same year, the mosque was closed, like the other religious institutions, after the anti-religious communist leader Enver Hoxha declared Albania an atheist state. Unlike many mosques that were destroyed during this time, the Lead Mosque survived, probably because it was designated as a Cultural Monument in 1948.

On 16 November 1990, the Lead Mosque preceded other mosques in Albania to reopen when religion was again allowed in the country. The very first religious rally was held in this mosque by Hafiz Sabri Koçi, after 23 years of state atheism.

== Architecture ==
The Lead Mosque was completed in the Ottoman style, unlike most other mosques in Albania which follow Arab architecture. The mosque closely mirrors the Classical Ottoman style of Istanbul, Turkey, pioneered by architect Mimar Sinan during the 16th century.

The mosque is built with hewn stones of almost the same size, that created a construction symmetry. Stones were brought from the nearby village of Gur i Zi by people who aligned to each other over kilometers passing the stones to reach the construction point.

=== Restoration ===
Flood damage in rainy seasons resulted in damage to the Lead Mosque over time. The mosque was repaired numerous times: including in 1863, 1920 and 1963. Beginning from 2021, the Albanian and Turkish governments completed the mosque's restoration.

== Gallery ==
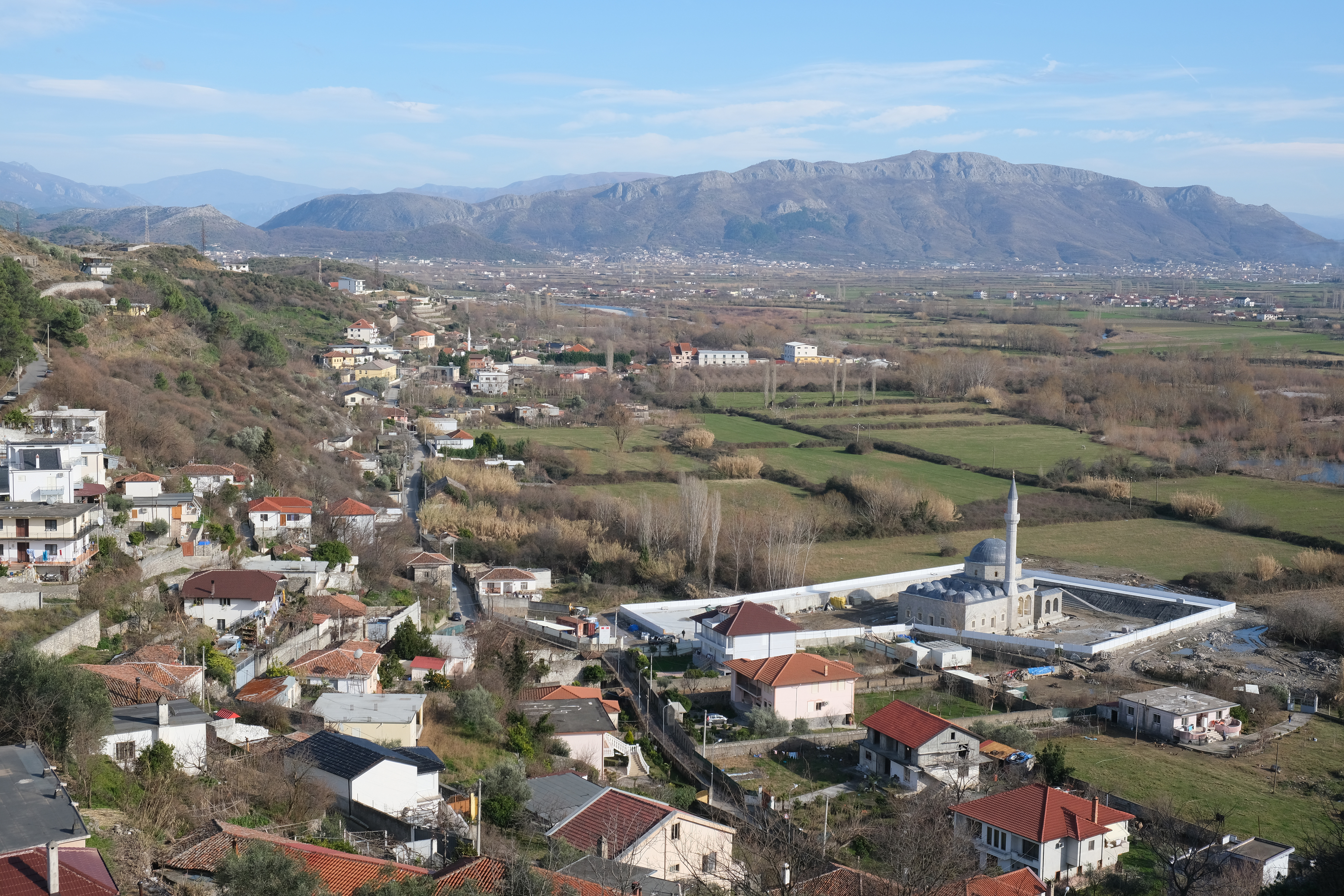
View to the restored mosque from Rozafa Castle

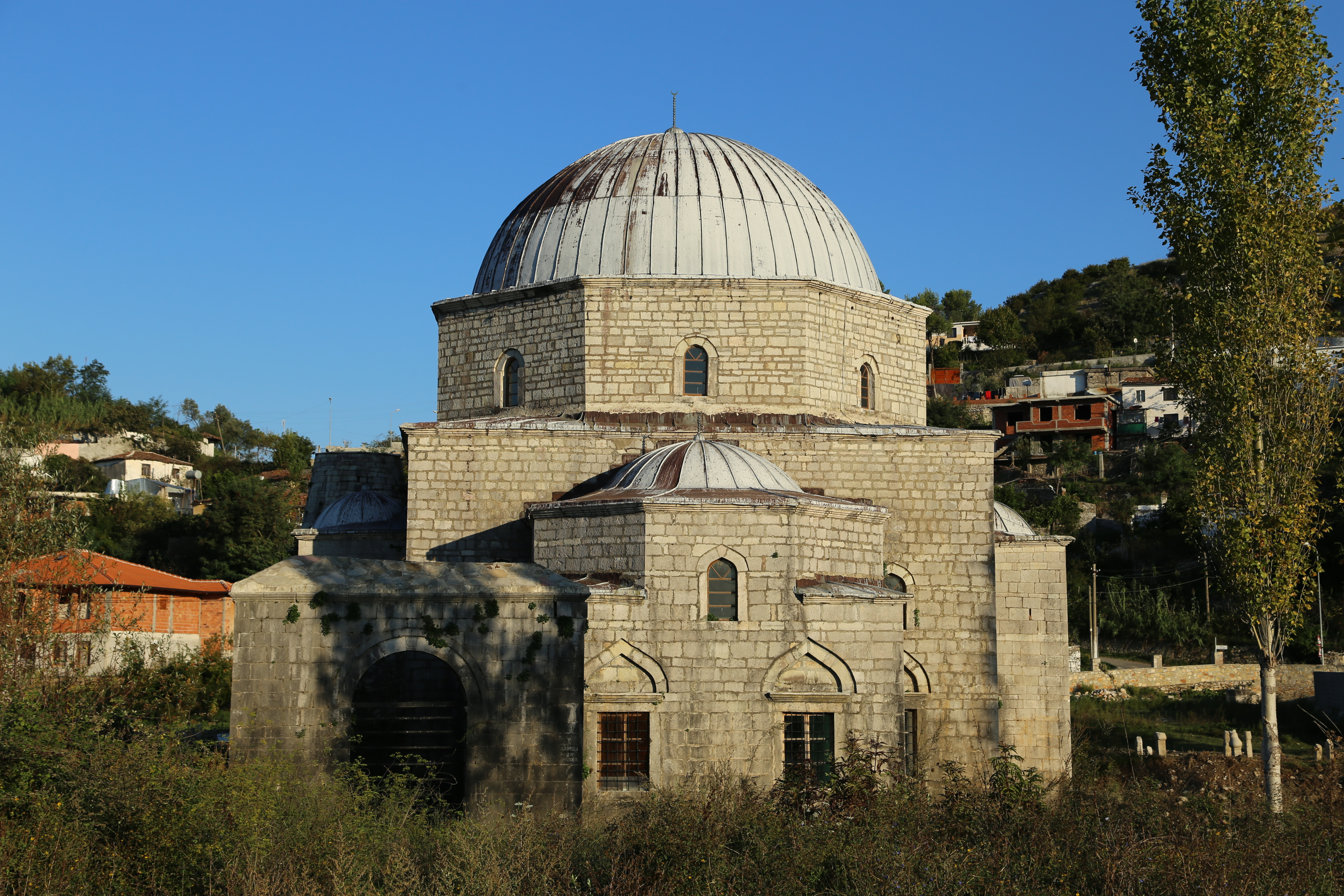
South side of the mosque

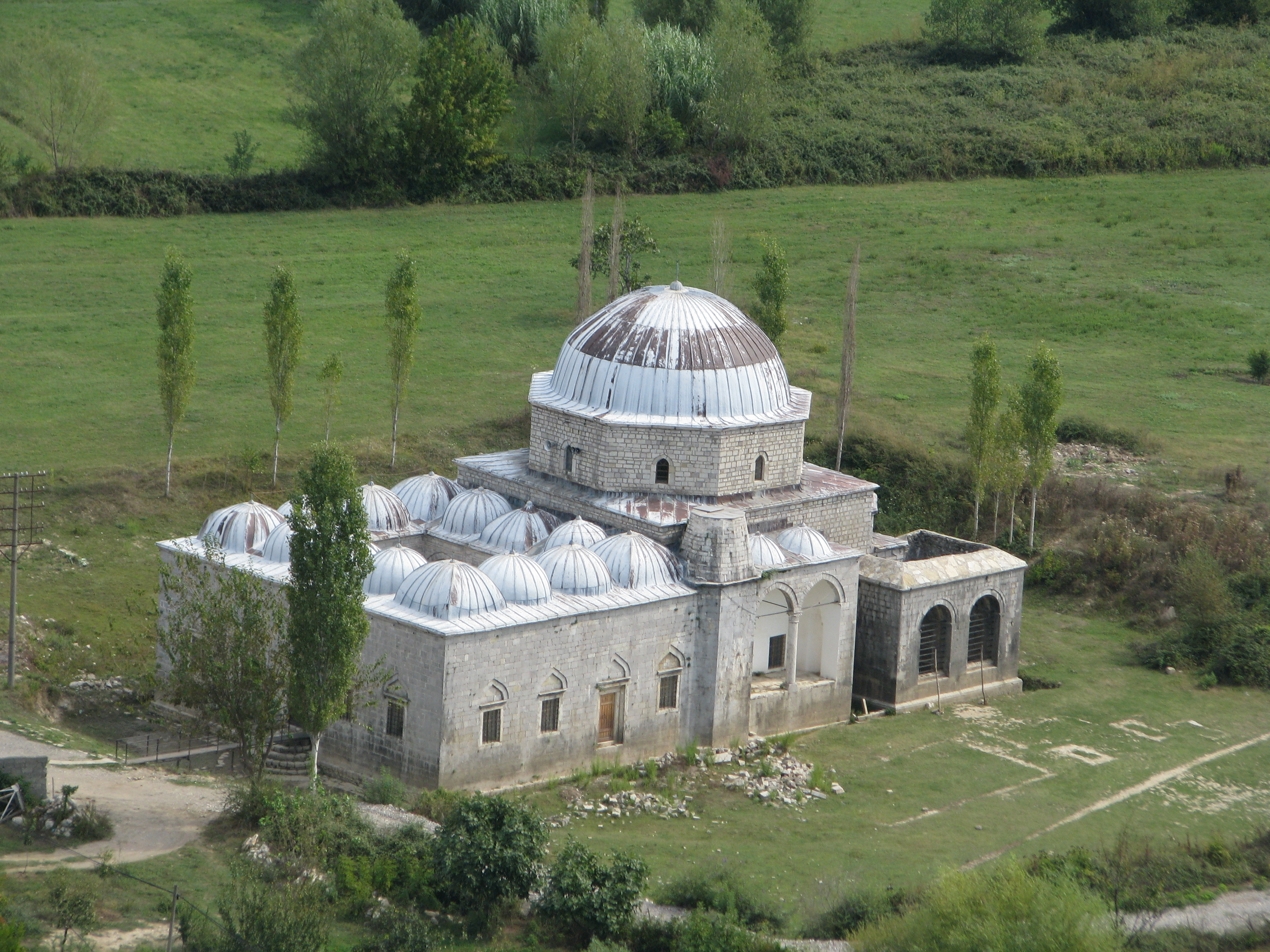

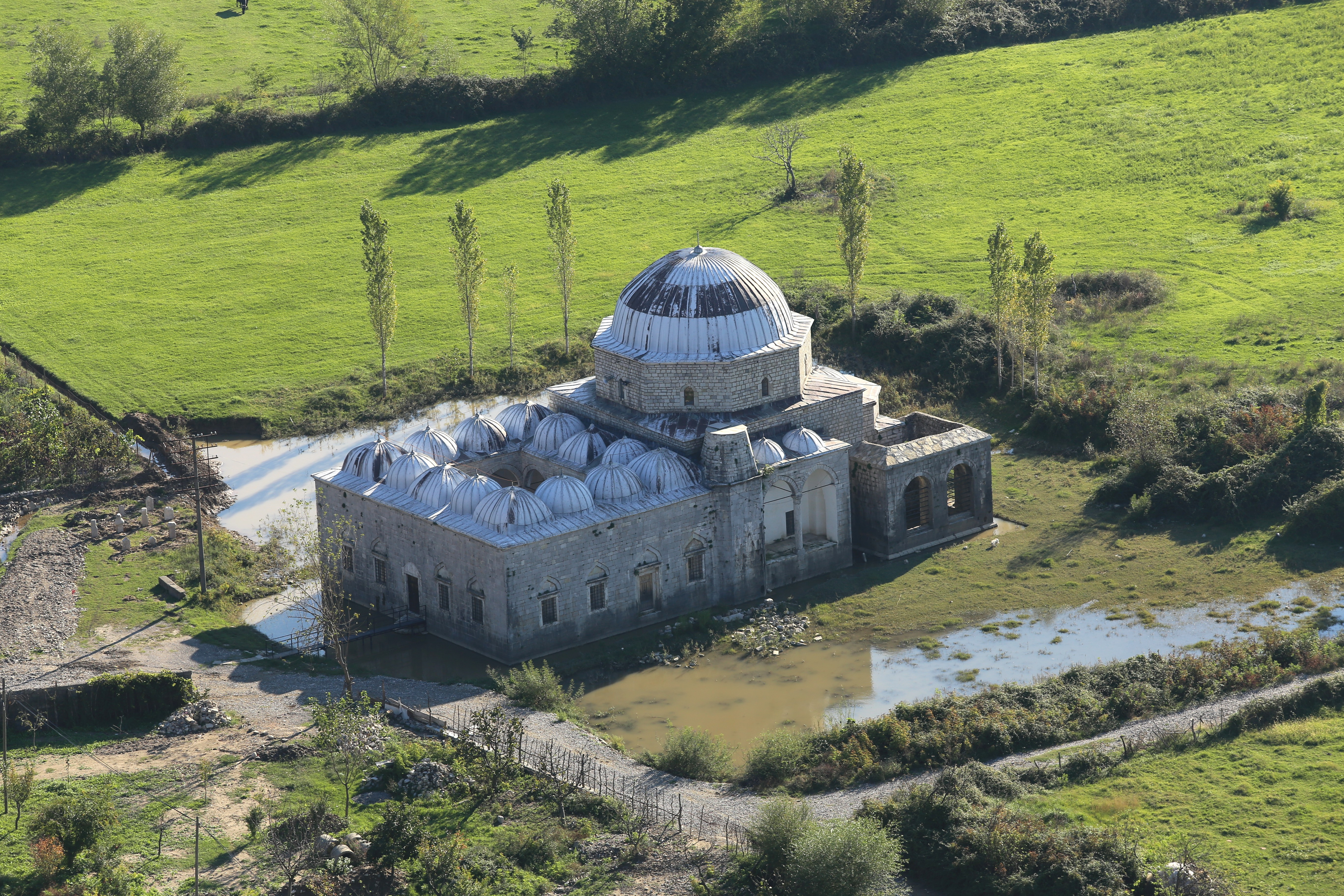
View from Rozafa Castle

== See also ==
- Islam in Albania
- List of mosques in Albania
- List of Religious Cultural Monuments of Albania
