= Rusan, Albania =

Rusan
- Village
- Location within Albania
- Coordinates: 39°57′14″N 20°4′30″E
- Country: Albania
- County: Vlorë
- Municipality: Delvinë
- Administrative unit: Delvinë
- Time zone: UTC+1 (CET)
  - Summer (DST): UTC+2 (CEST)

Rusan is a community in the Vlorë County, Albania. It is part of the municipality Delvinë. The village is inhabited by Muslim Albanians. In the village is the Gjin Aleksi's Mosque.
