= Parrucë Mosque =

Mosque in Shkodër City, Shkodër County, Albania

- Xhamia e Parrucës
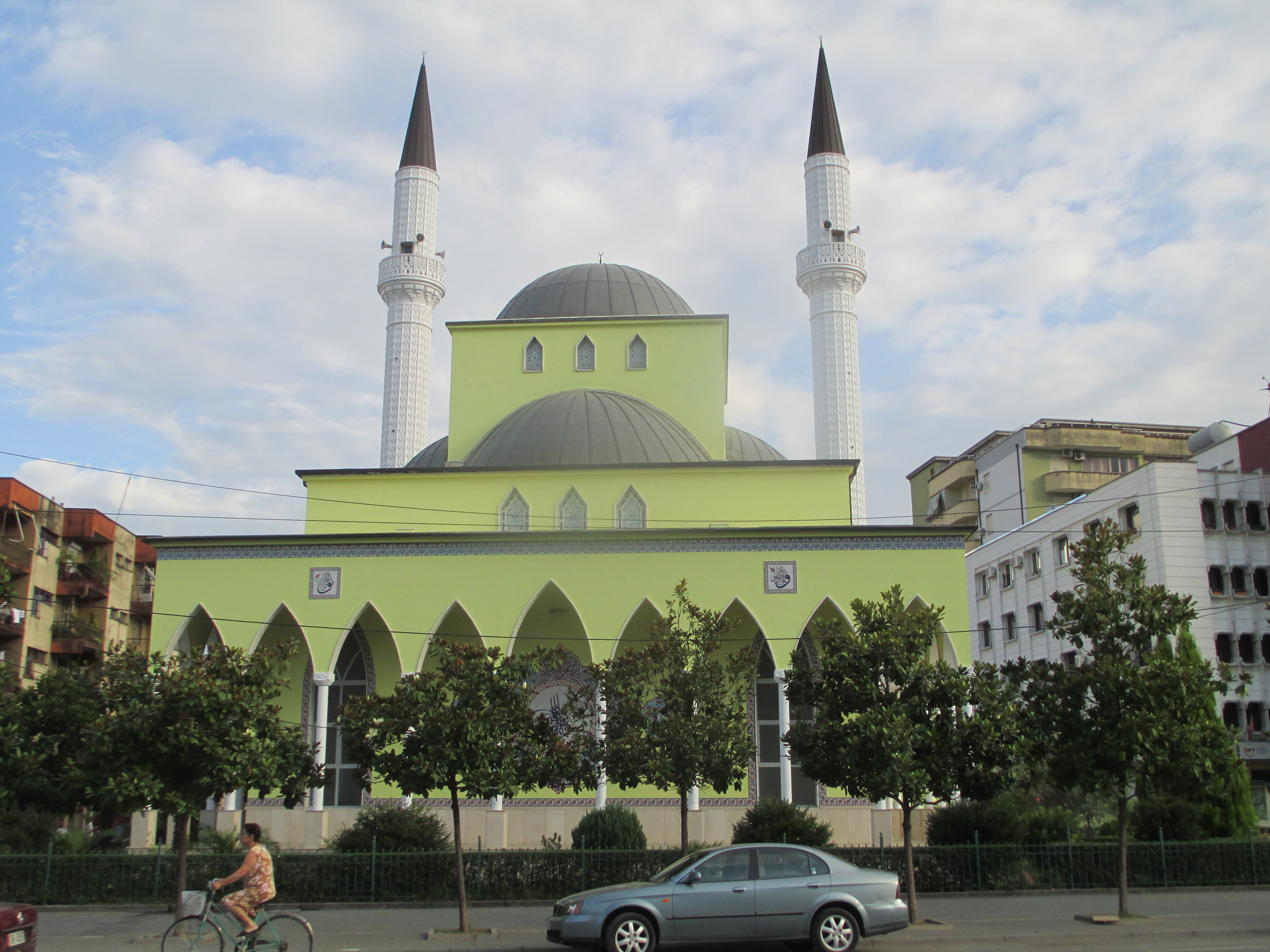
- The mosque in 2014

- Location of the mosque in Albania

Religion
- Affiliation: Sunni Islam
- Ecclesiastical or organizational status: Mosque: (1937–1967); (since 2006– )
- Status: Active

Location
- Location: Shkodër City, Shkodër County
- Country: Albania
- Interactive map of Parrucë Mosque
- Coordinates: 42°03′55″N 19°30′31″E

Architecture
- Type: Islamic architecture
- Style: Ottoman
- Completed: 1937 (first mosque); 2006 (reconstruction)
- Destroyed: 23 March 1967 (under Communist rule)

Specifications
- Dome: 3 (maybe more)
- Minaret: 2

The Parrucë Mosque (Albanian: Xhamia e Parrucës) is a mosque in Shkodër City, Shkodër County, Albania. The original mosque was constructed in 1937 during the era of the Albanian Kingdom on the site of an Ottoman one built in the 17th century. After being destroyed again in 1967, it was rebuilt in the same style in 2006.

== History ==
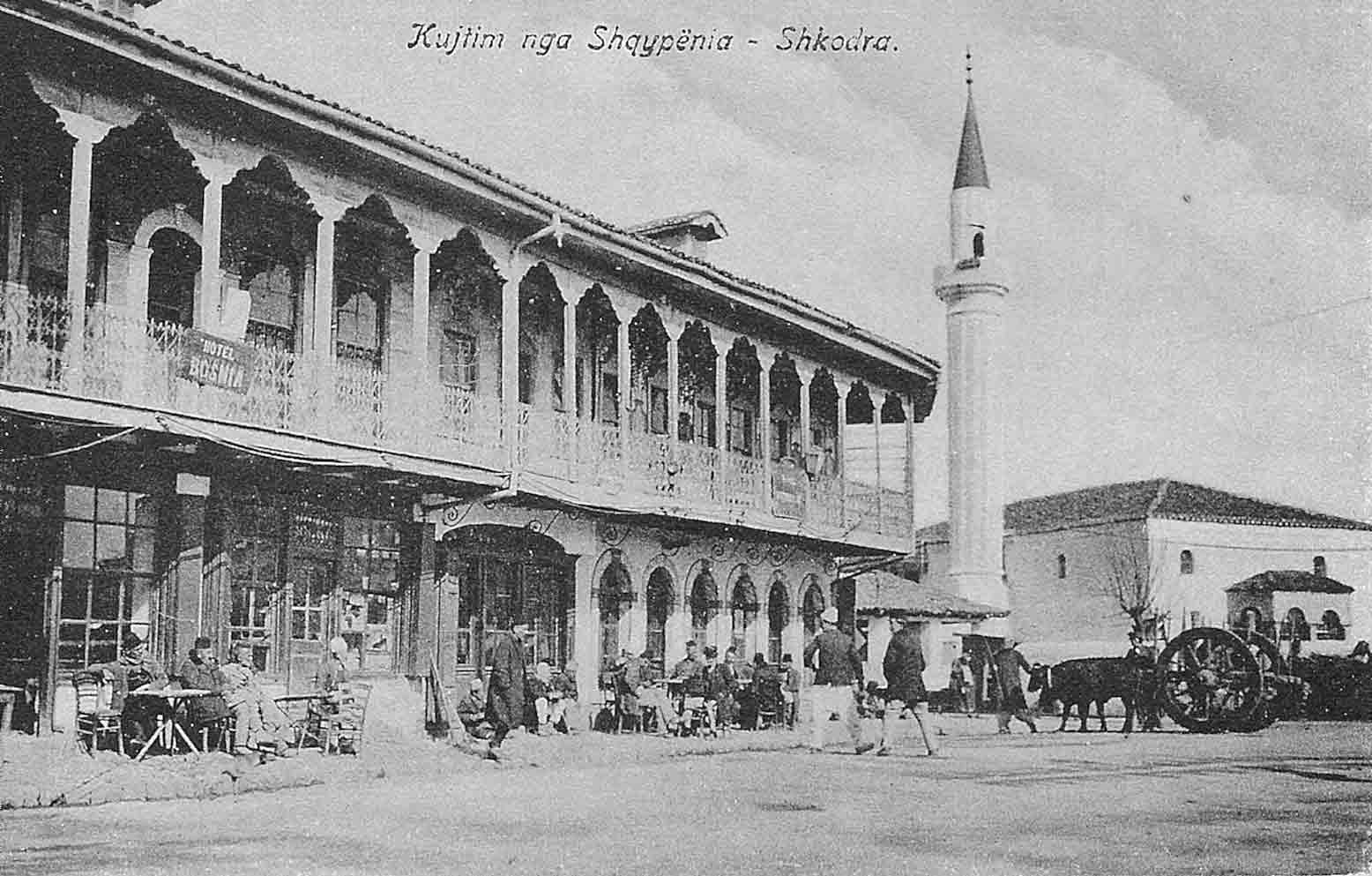
The first mosque at the Parruce road (around 1910)

The original Parruca Mosque was constructed in 1937 and destroyed, alongside other houses of worship during the Communist dictatorship of Enver Hoxha, on March 23, 1967. The Parruce mosque itself replaced an older, smaller, more traditional and historic mosque from Ottoman times built in the 17th century. The recononstruction was completed in 2006 in the original Ottoman style with funding from Haxhi Sait Jakup Fishta. Exactly 40 years after the destruction of the old mosque, the Parruca Mosque was consecrated on March 23, 2007. The interior is decorated with bright colour paintings.

== See also ==
- Islam in Albania
- List of mosques in Albania
