= Fatih Mosque, Durrës =

Mosque in Durrës, Albania

Fatih Mosque
- Xhamia e Fatihut
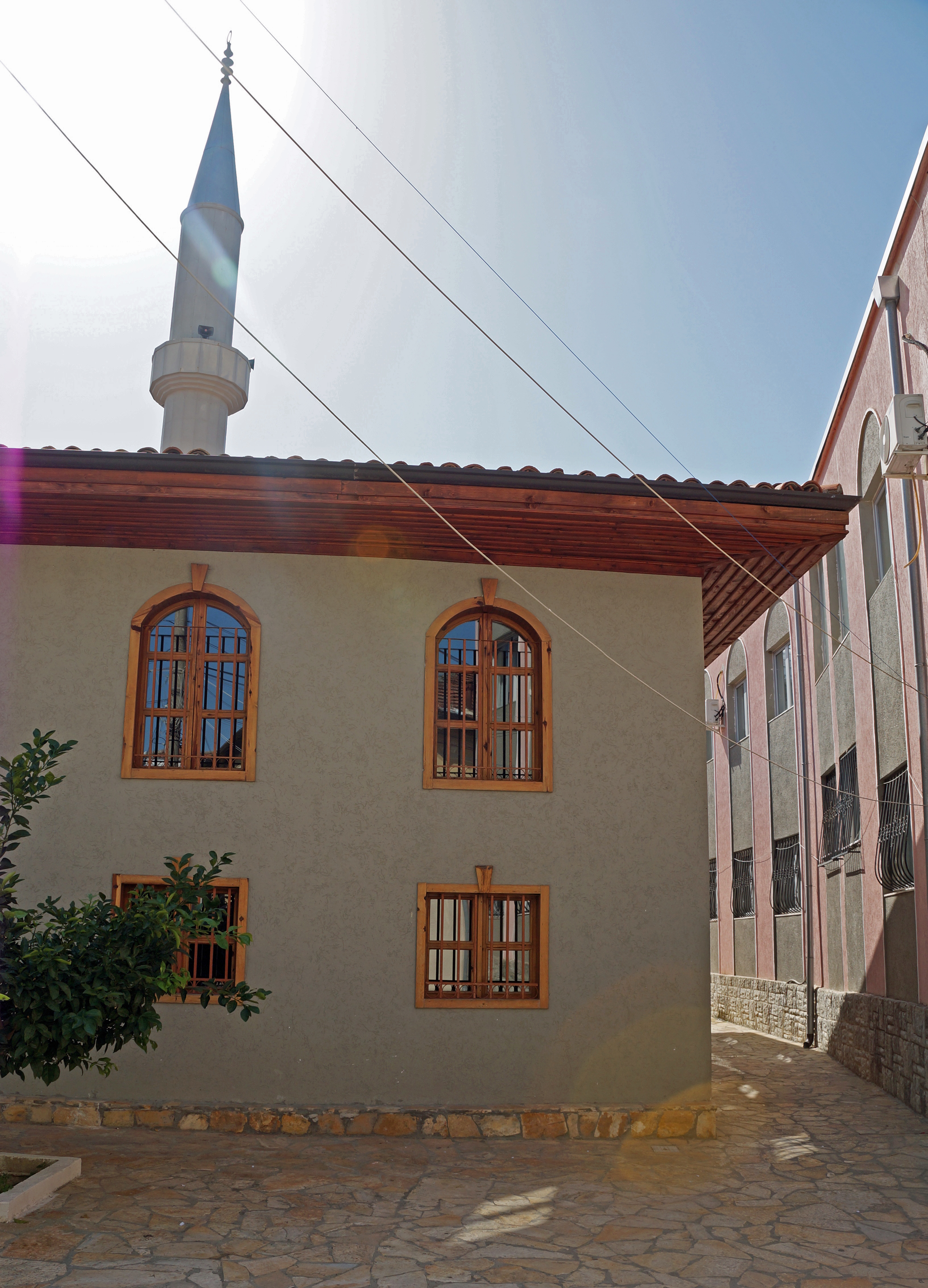
- The mosque in 2015

- Location of the mosque in Albania

Religion
- Affiliation: Islam
- Ecclesiastical or organizational status: Mosque: (1502 CE–1967); (since 1991– )
- Status: Active

Location
- Location: Durrës, Durrës County
- Country: Albania
- Interactive map of Fatih Mosque
- Coordinates: 41°18′40″N 19°26′45″E

Architecture
- Type: Islamic architecture
- Style: Ottoman
- Completed: 1502 CE
- Minaret: 1 (replaced)

Cultural Monument of Albania
- Official name: Fatih Mosque
- Designated: 1973
- Reference no.: DR028

The Fatih Mosque (Albanian: Xhamia e Fatihut), also known alternately as Xhamia e vogël (transl. The Small Mosque) and Xhamia e vjetër (transl. The Old Mosque), is a mosque, located in Durrës, Albania. Completed in 1502, the year after the Turkish conquest of the city, the mosque was designated as a Cultural Monument of Albania in 1973.

== Overview ==
The mosque was built in 1502 and named for the Ottoman Sultan Mehmed the Conqueror, (Sulltan Mehmet Fatihu). It is known that the minaret of the Vogel Mosque was never the original one, because from 1501 until as late as 1700, it was targeted by Venetian ships when the trade was not going well. The tower behind the wall had large fig trees, which camouflaged the minaret during the Ottoman period. Closed by the Communist dictatorship under Enver Hoxha, when state atheism was introduced, in c. 1967 its minaret was torn down and was later rebuilt in a simpler style after 1991. The current restoration was done after the 1990s.

== See also ==
- Islam in Albania
- List of mosques in Albania
- List of Religious Cultural Monuments of Albania
