= Historic Centres of Berat and Gjirokastër =

World Heritage Site and a tourist attraction in Albania

UNESCO World Heritage Site
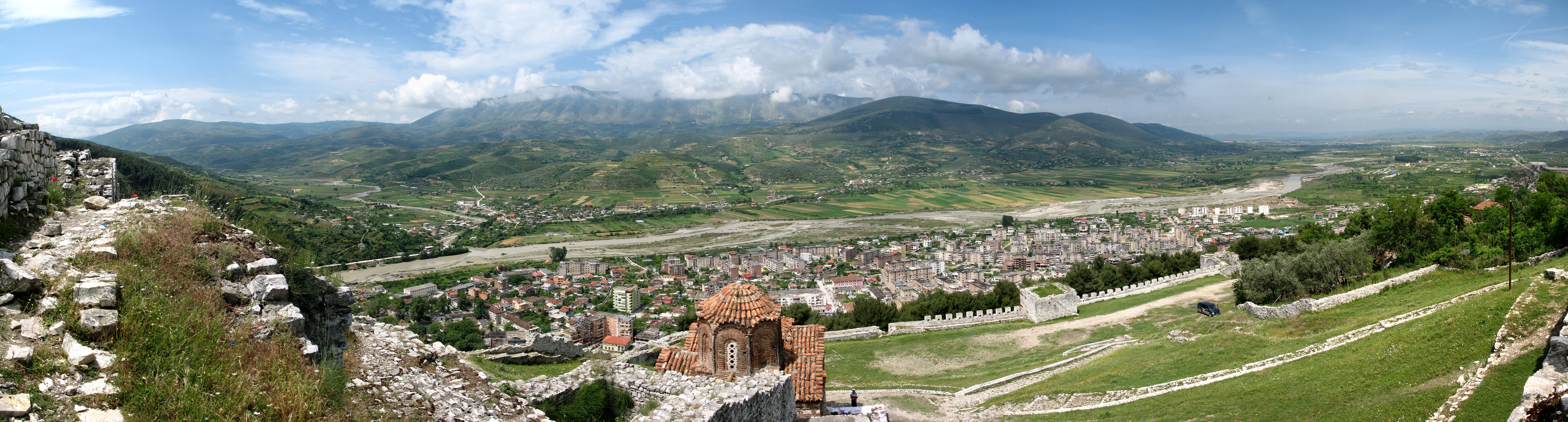
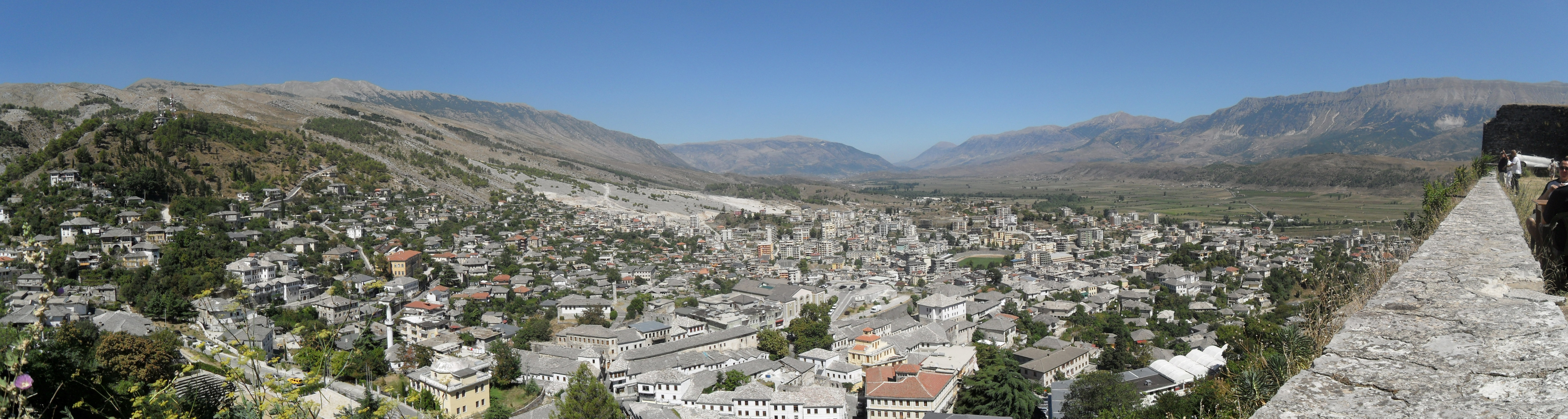
- Panoramas of Berat (top) and Gjirokastër (bottom)
- Interactive map of Historic Centres of Berat and Gjirokastër
- Location: Albania
- Criteria: Cultural: iii, iv
- Reference: 569
- Inscription: 2005 (29th Session)
- Extensions: 2008

The Historic Centres of Berat and Gjirokastër (Albanian: Qendrat historike të Beratit dhe Gjirokastrës) encompasses the cities of Berat and Gjirokastër in southern Albania. Gjirokastër was added to the UNESCO World Heritage Site list in 2005 while Berat was added as a site extension in 2008. They are inscribed as rare examples of an architectural character typical of the Ottoman period.

Berat is often referred as the city of a thousand windows and considered one of the architectural treasures of Albania. Traces from Illyrians, Greeks, Romans, Byzantines and Ottomans are still evident and well preserved in the city with castles and mansions, old churches and mosques and impressive wall paintings, icons and murals. Throughout the centuries, Berat was the place where various religions and communities coexisted in peace.

Gjirokastër, referred as the city of stone, stretches on the steep side of the Drino River valley overlooking the historic landscape with picturesque stone architecture framed by mountains at every side. As most of other cities in Albania, Gjirokastër bears architectural treasures of various civilizations that previously conquered the region.

== Attractions ==
=== Berat ===
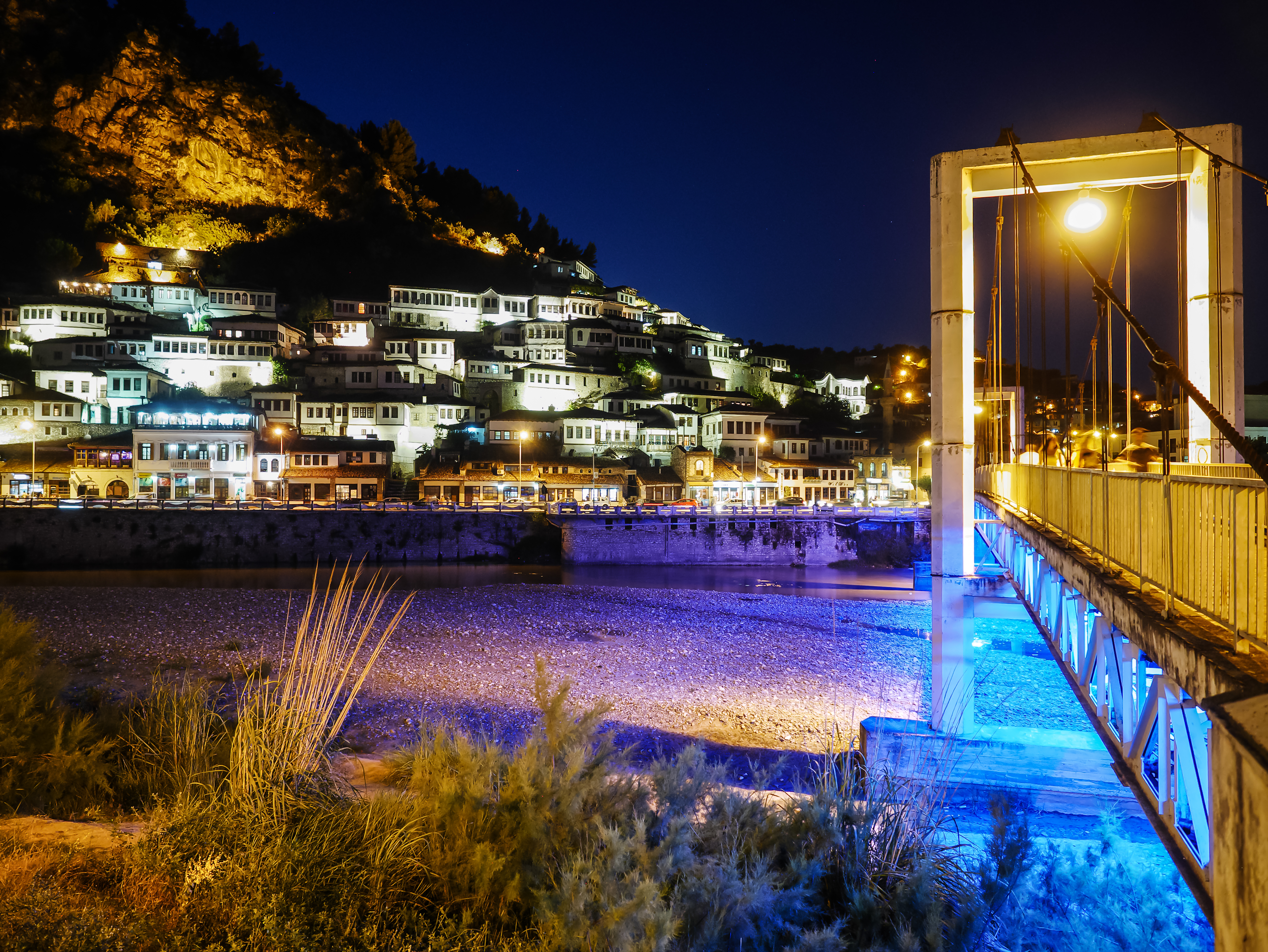
Mangalem district

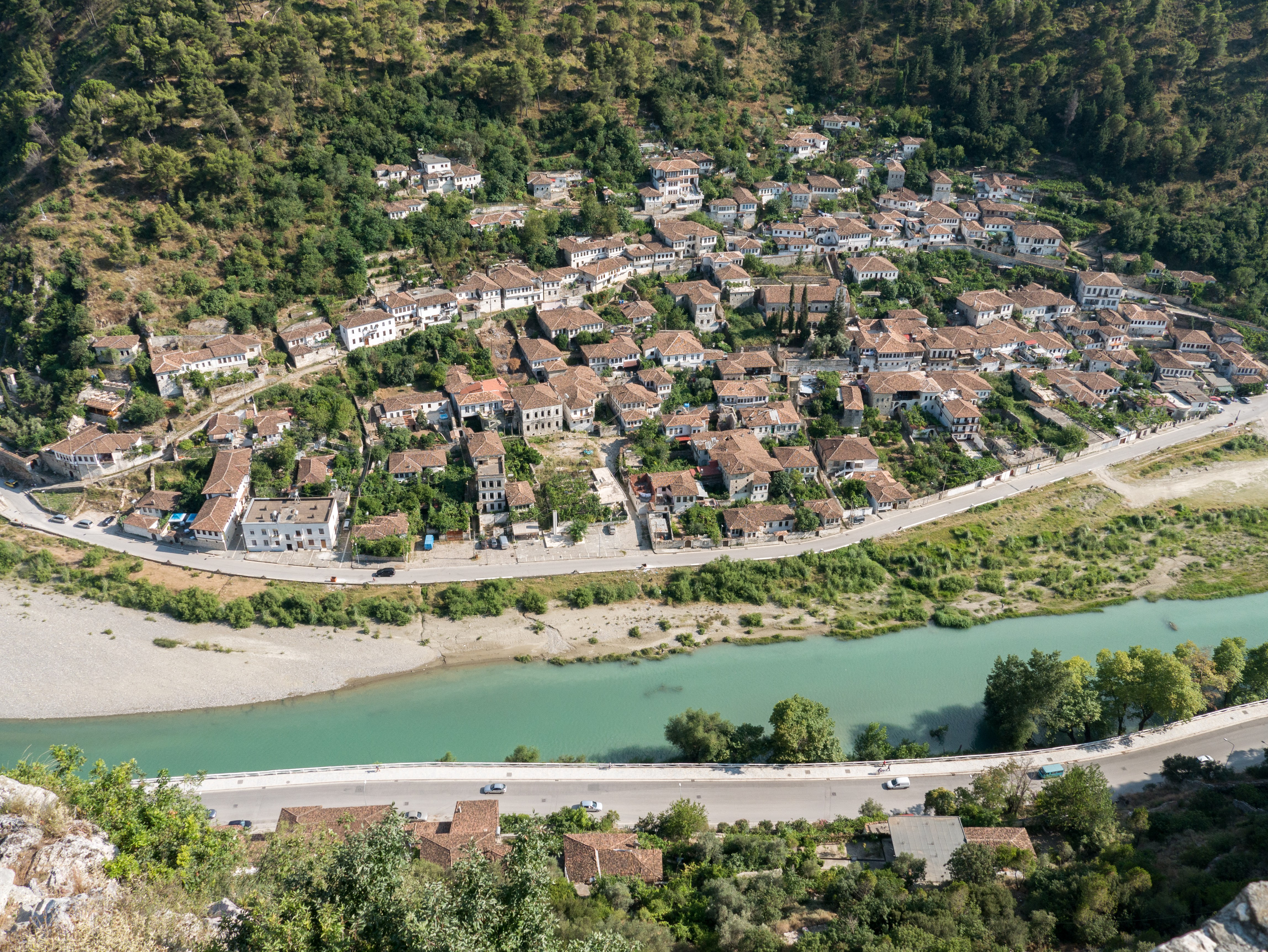
Gorica district

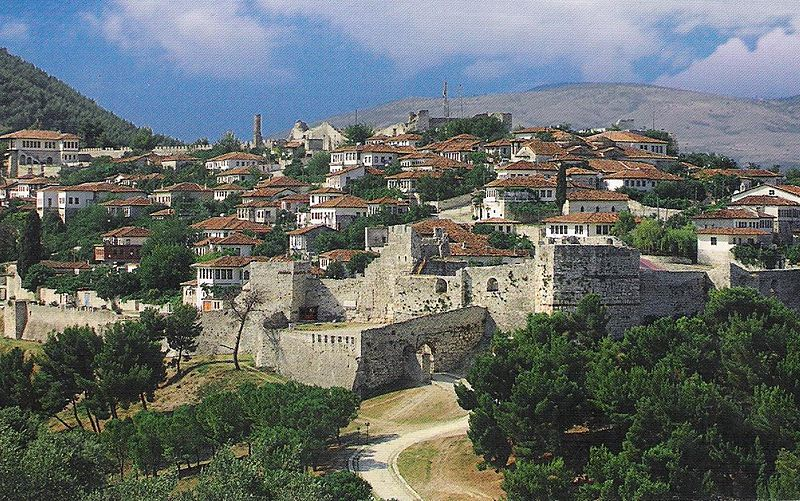
Kalaja district

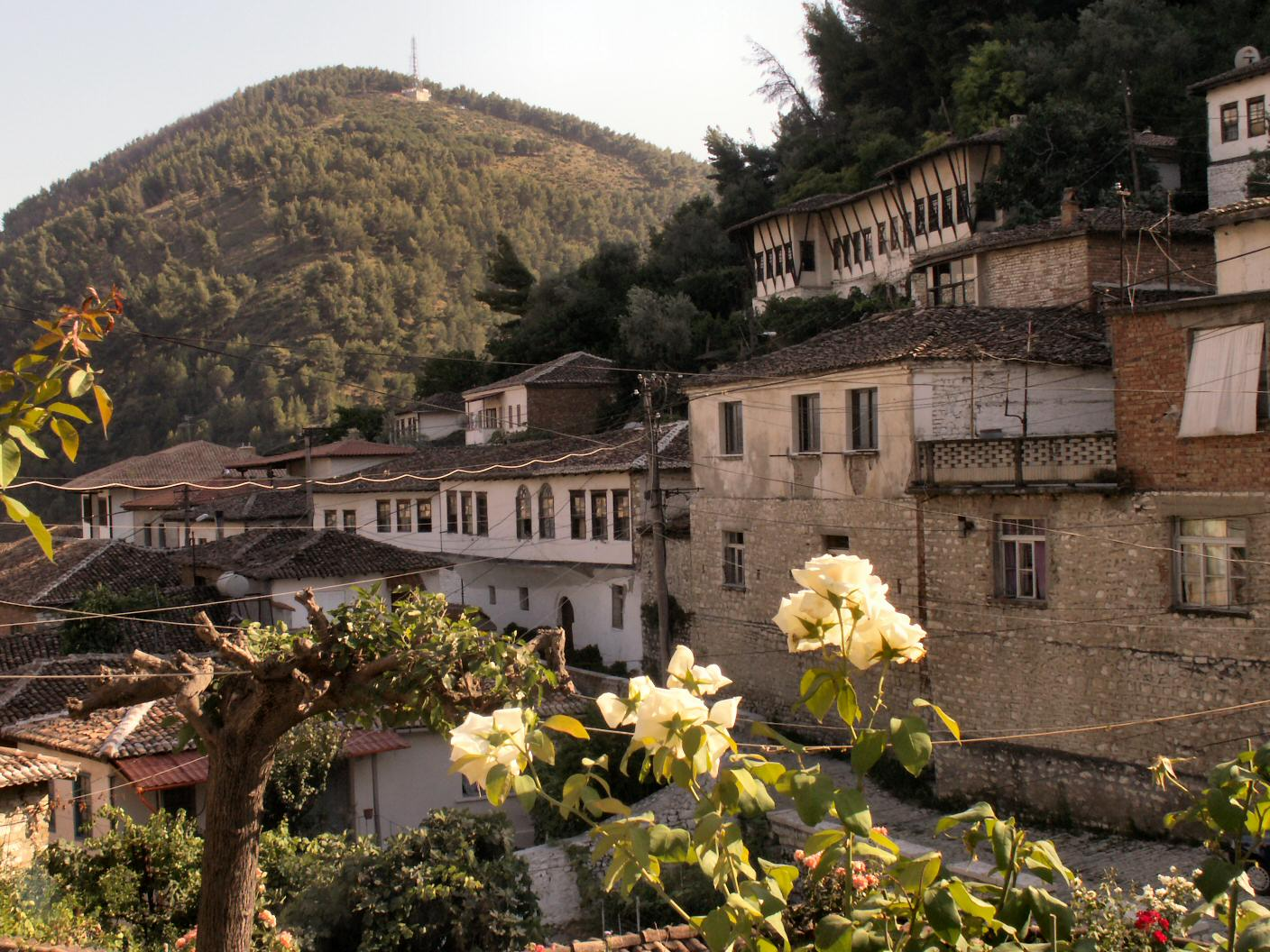
Houses in Kalaja district

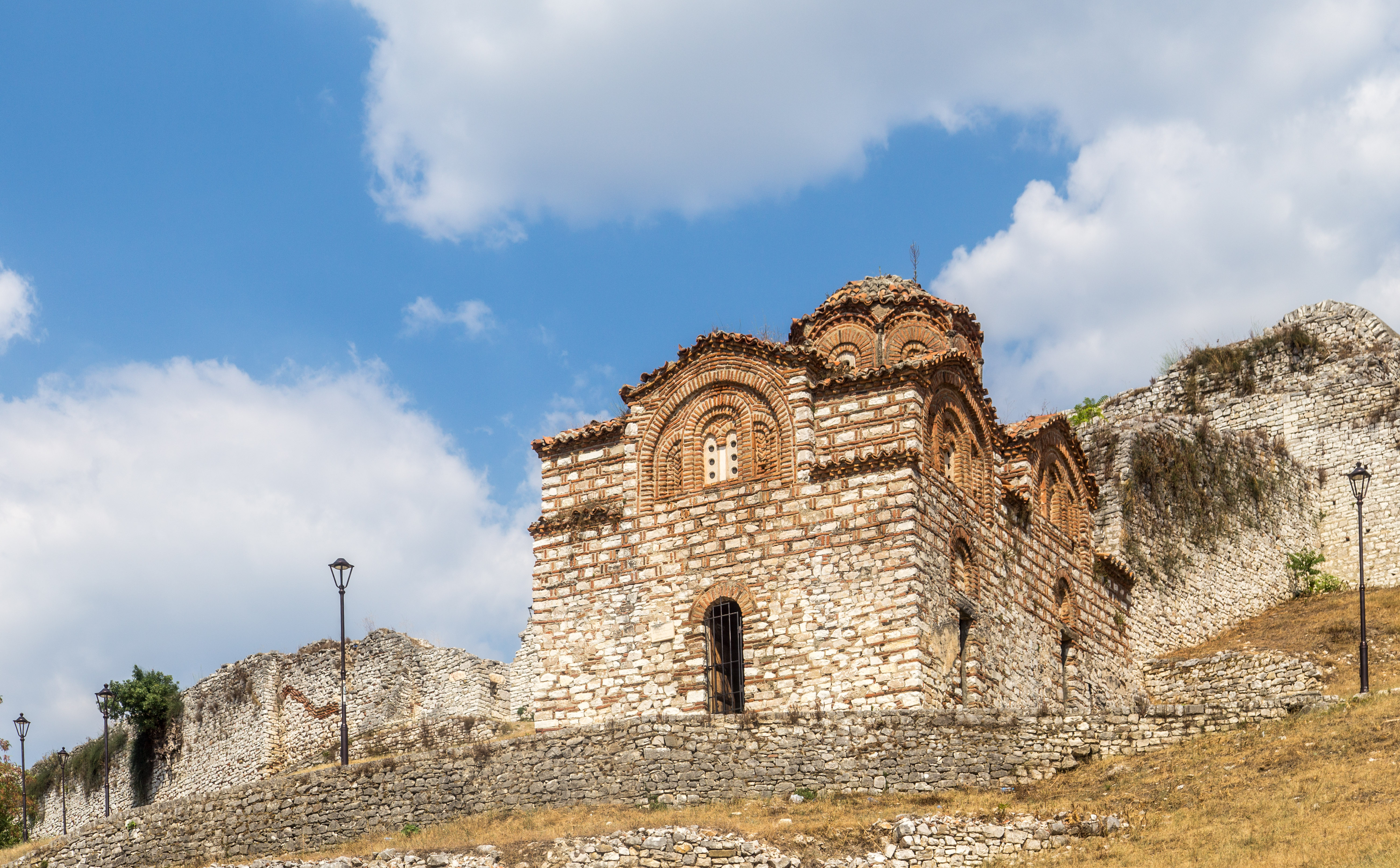
Holy Trinity Church

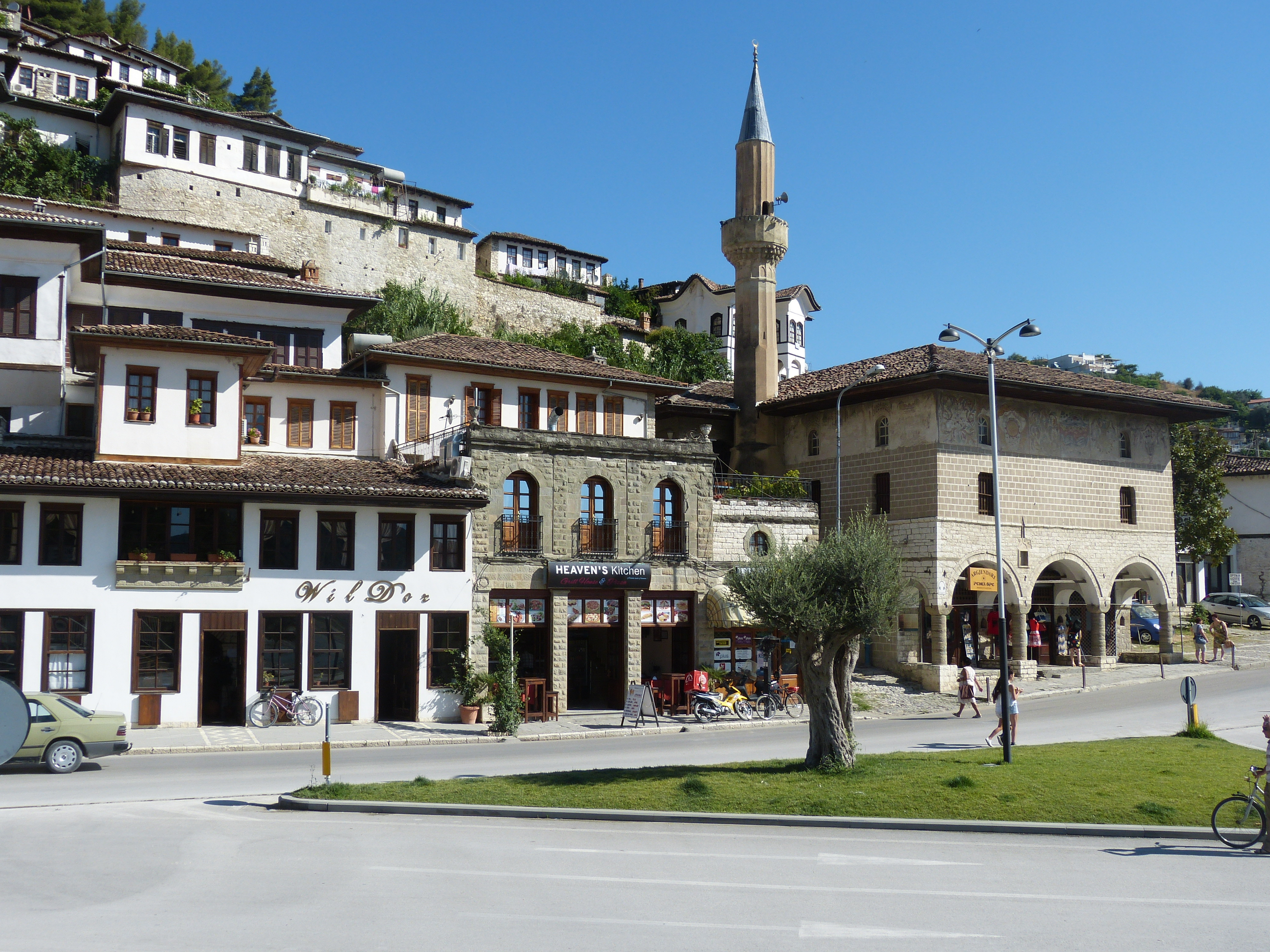
Bachelors Mosque

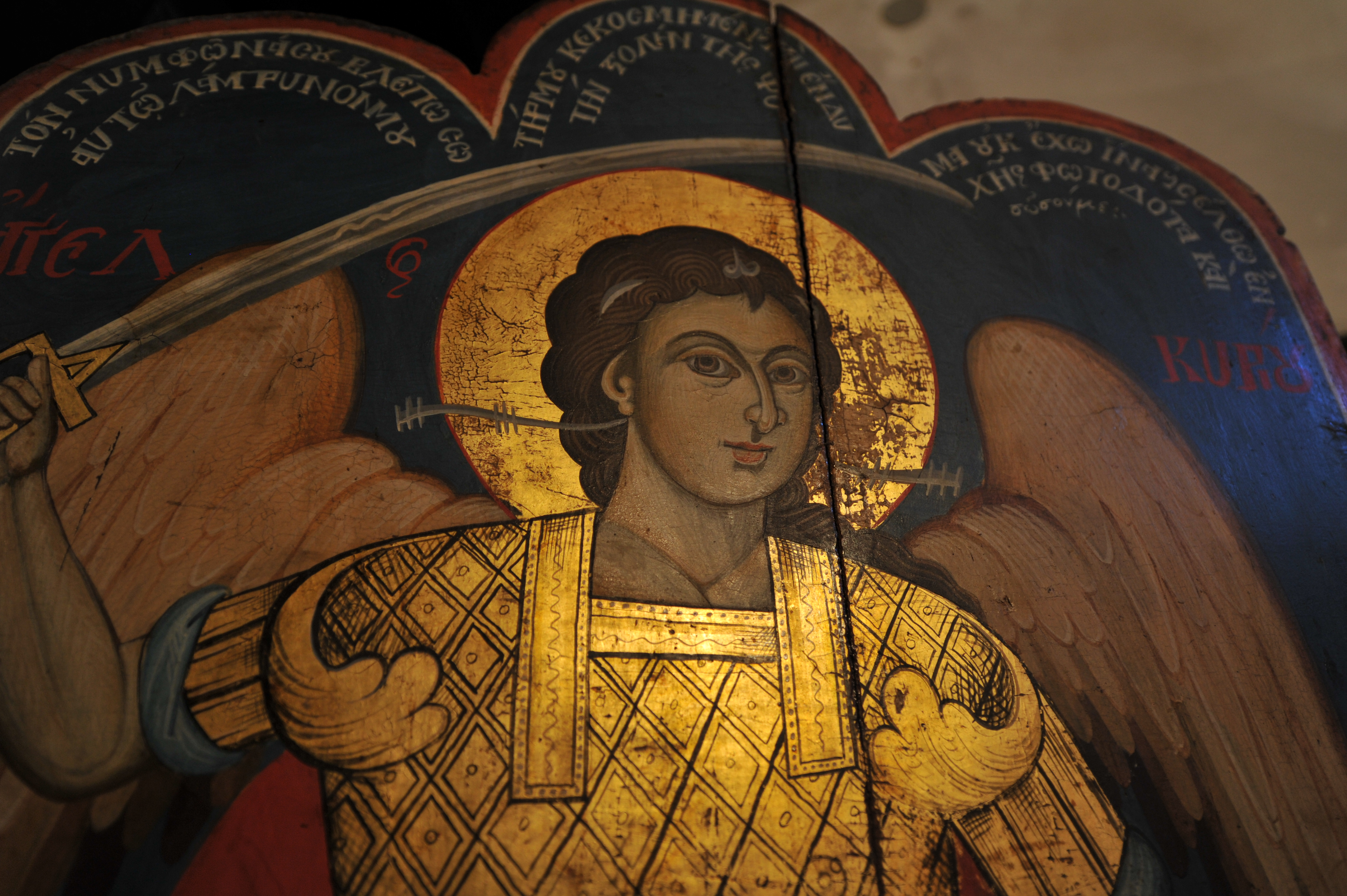
Fresco at St. Theodore's Church

== See also ==
- Culture & Architecture of Albania
- List of World Heritage Sites in Albania
