= Cultural Monument of Albania =

Heritage designation in Albania

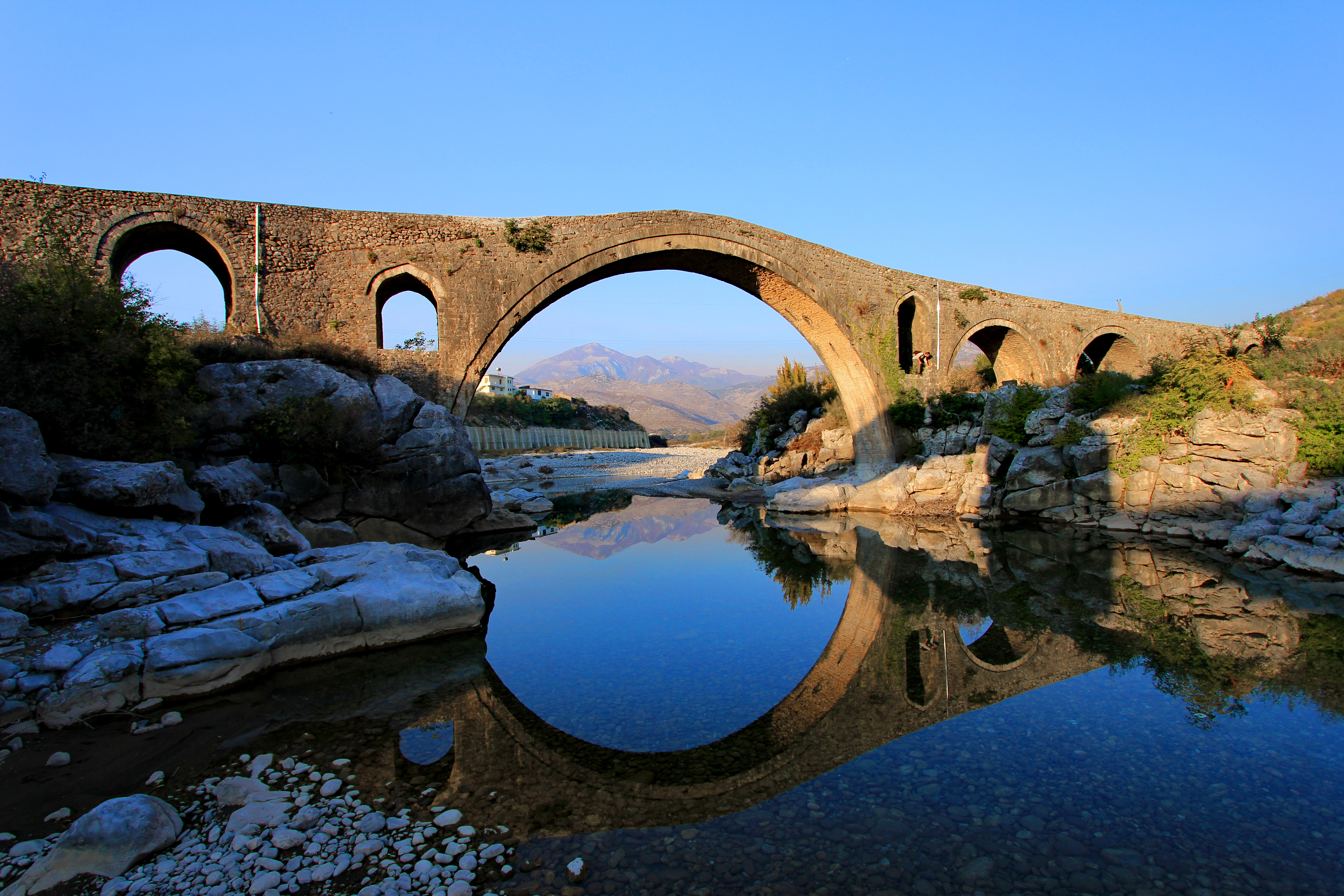
Mesi Bridge standing above the Kir river stream in north-western Albania was declared a cultural monument on June 10, 1973.

In Albania, a cultural monument (Albanian: monument kulture) is a construction or work of cultural, historical and artistic value that is built in a visible space, made in memory of important events or prominent people. Cultural monuments are usually under state protection as they are evidence of the history of human development, for the preservation of which there is a public interest.

== Definition ==
Law nr.9048, dated 04.07.2003, titled "For Cultural Heritage" describes a cultural monument as an object or building with historical-cultural value that is protected by the state. Cultural monuments are classified into two categories:

=== Category I ===
Cultural Monuments of the first category are buildings of significant value and importance for cultural heritage. They are preserved in the balance of their architectural and technical components. The volume composition, the architectural treatment of the external and internal views, as well as the planimetric and functional solution of these monuments cannot be changed. New buildings near them must respect the distances of the protected surrounding space.

=== Category II ===
Cultural monuments of the second category are buildings of significant value, mainly in their external appearance. They are preserved in their volume and appearance.

Both categories are declared as such by the Ministry of Culture.

== See also ==
- Cultural heritage of Albania
- List of Religious Cultural Monuments of Albania
