= Islamization of Albania =

Gradual conversion of Albanians from Christianity to Islam during the Ottoman period

The Islamization of Albania occurred as a result of the Ottoman conquest of the region beginning in 1385. The Ottomans through their administration and military brought Islam to Albania.

In the first few centuries of Ottoman rule, the spread of Islam in Albania was slow and mainly intensified during the seventeenth and eighteenth centuries. It was one of the most significant developments in Albanian history as Albanians in Albania went from being a largely Christian (Catholic and Orthodox) population to one that is mainly Sunni Muslim, while retaining significant ethnic Albanian Christian minorities in certain regions. The resulting situation where Sunni Islam was the largest faith in the Albanian ethnolinguistic area, but other faiths were also present in a regional patchwork, played a major influence in shaping the political development of Albania in the late Ottoman period. Apart from religious changes, conversion to Islam also brought about other social and cultural transformations that have shaped and influenced Albanians and Albanian culture.

== History ==
=== Early Ottoman period ===
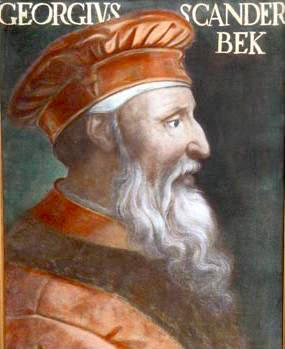
Skanderbeg (1405–1468)

Albanians began converting to Islam when they became part of the Ottoman Empire in the late 14th century. Albania differs from other regions in the Balkans such as Bulgaria and Bosnia in that until the 1500s, Islam remained confined to members of the co-opted aristocracy and sparse military outpost settlements of Yuruks. In the early 1430s, Ottoman rule was challenged by Albanian feudal lords from northern and central Albania and the Ottomans responded with two military campaigns. The Albanian defeats resulted in the Ottomans awarding much land to timars from Anatolia and a quarter to Albanians from the elite. The first conversions to Islam by some of the Albanian Christian elite allowed them to retain some previous political and economic privileges, and to join the emerging class of timar or estate holders of the sipahis in the new Ottoman system.

Among some of these aristocratic figures were George Kastrioti (Skanderbeg) who while in the service of the Ottomans was a convert to Islam and later reverted to Christianity during the late 15th century during the northern Albanian uprising he initiated. In doing so, he also ordered others who had embraced Islam or were Muslim colonists to convert to Christianity or face death. Skanderbeg received military assistance from the Kingdom of Naples that sent in 1452 Ramon d'Ortafà who was appointed as viceroy of Albania and tasked with maintaining Catholicism among the local population from the spread of Islam. During the conflicts between Skanderbeg and Ottomans the various battles and raiding pushed Sultan Mehmet II to construct the fortress of Elbasan (1466) in the lowlands to counter resistance coming from the mountain strongholds. During Skanderbeg's uprising, many of the Muslims and Jews in the Vlorë area were killed and some fled to Italy or Istanbul. Prior to and after Skanderbeg's death (1468) parts of the Albanian aristocracy migrated to southern Italy with some number of Albanians to escape the Ottoman conquest whose descendants still reside in many villages they settled. Another Albanian uprising against Ottoman rule happened in 1481.

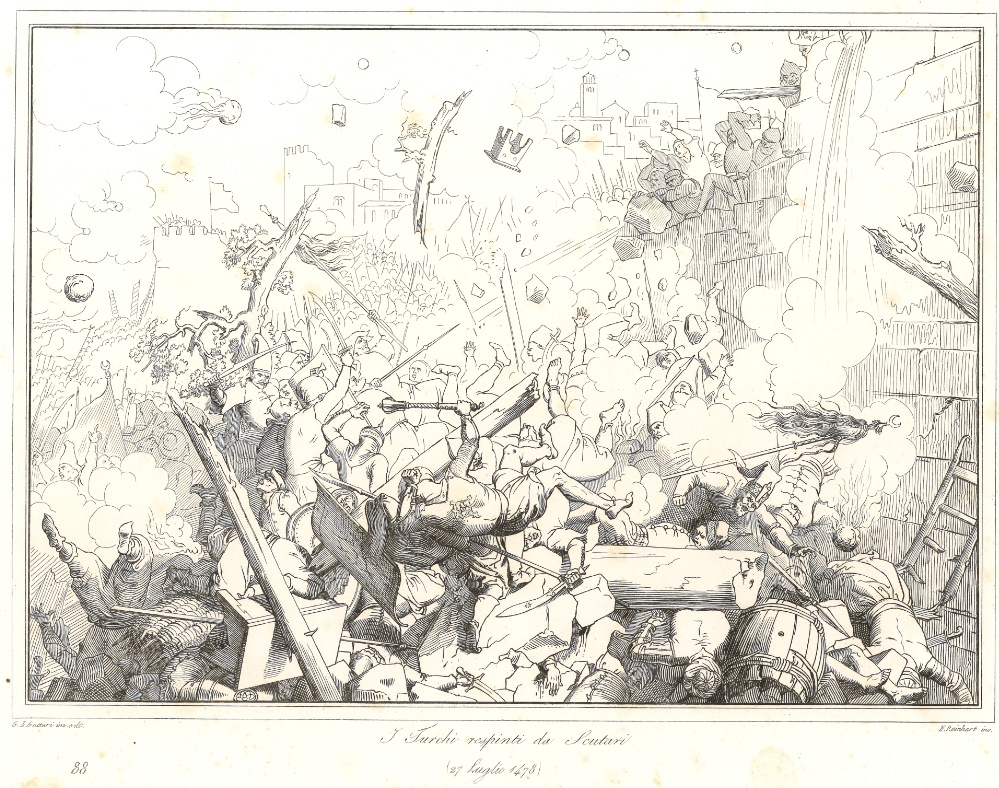
Siege of Shkodër, 1478

Even long after the fall of Skanderbeg, large regions of the Albanian countryside frequently rebelled against Ottoman rule, often incurring large human costs, including the decimation of whole villages. In the 1570s, a concerted effort by Ottoman rulers to convert the native population to Islam in order to stop the occurrence of seasonal rebellions began in Elbasan and Reka, and a failed rebellion in 1596 among Catholics in the North preceded a series of heavy punitive measures that induced conversion to Islam. The peak of Islamization in Albania occurred much later than other Islamized or partially Islamized areas: 16th century Ottoman census data showed that sanjaks where Albanians lived remained overwhelmingly Christian with Muslims making up no more than 5% in most areas while during this period Muslims had already risen to large proportions in parts of Bosnia (Bosnia 46%, Herzegovina 43%, urban Sarajevo 100%), Northern Greece (Trikala 17.5%), urban Macedonia (Skopje and Bitola both at 75%) and Eastern Bulgaria (Silistra 72%, Chirmen 88%, Nikopol 22%). Later on, in the 19th century, when the process of Islamization had halted in most of the Balkans it continued to make significant progress in Albania, especially in the South.

In the early period of Ottoman rule, the areas that form contemporary Albania were reorganised into an administrative unit named Sancak-i Arnavid or Sancak-i Arnavud. During the onset of Ottoman rule only prominent churches with significant symbolic meaning or cultural value of an urban settlement were converted into mosques. Most early mosques constructed in Albania were mainly built within fortresses for Ottoman garrisons at times by Ottoman Sultans during their military campaigns in the area like Fatih Sultan Mehmet Mosque in Shkodër, the Red Mosque in Berat and others.

As a rule, Ottoman rule largely tolerated Christian subjects but also discriminated against them, making them second-class citizens with higher taxes and various legal restrictions like being unable to take Muslims to court, have horses, have weapons, or have houses overlooking those of Muslims. While the Ottoman authorities were chronically suspicious of Catholicism, they largely allowed the Orthodox church to function unhindered, except during certain periods when the church was suppressed with expulsions of bishops and seizure of property and revenues. During the Ottoman period, most Christians as well as most Muslims employed a degree of syncretism, still practicing various pagan rites; many of these rites are best preserved among mystical orders like the Bektashi Order.

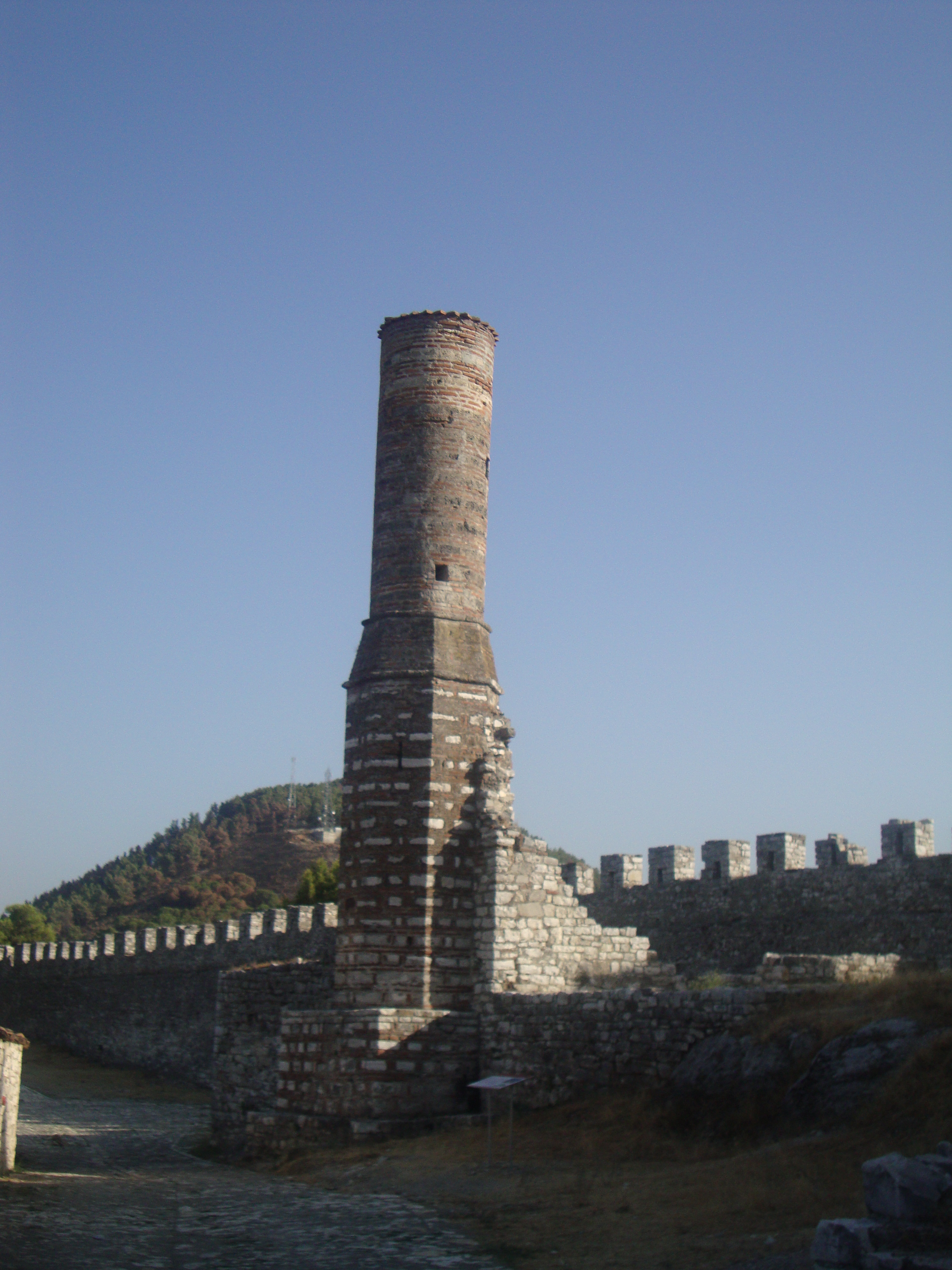
Ruined Red Mosque within citadel, Berat.

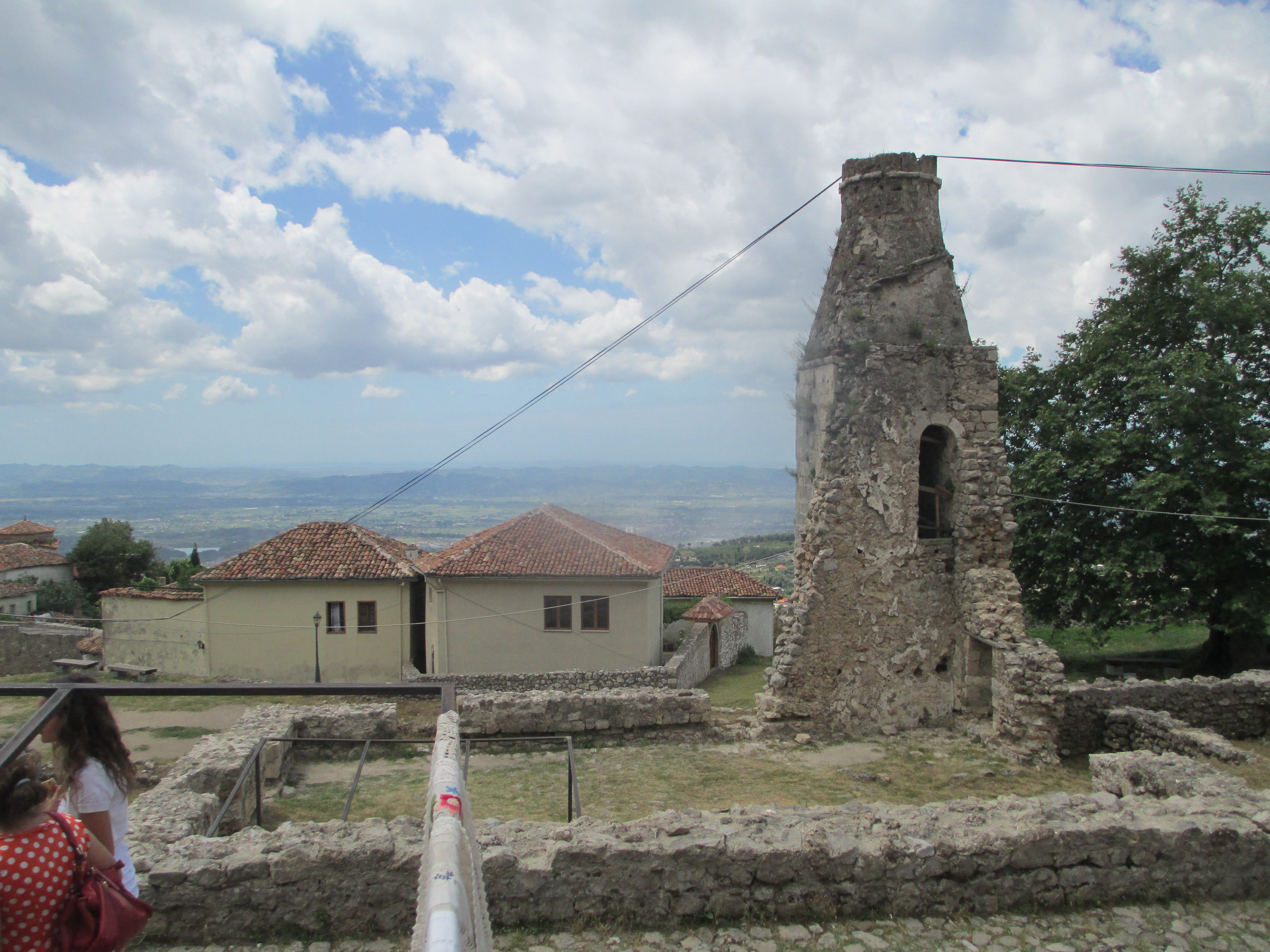
Ruined Fethije Mosque within citadel, Krujë.

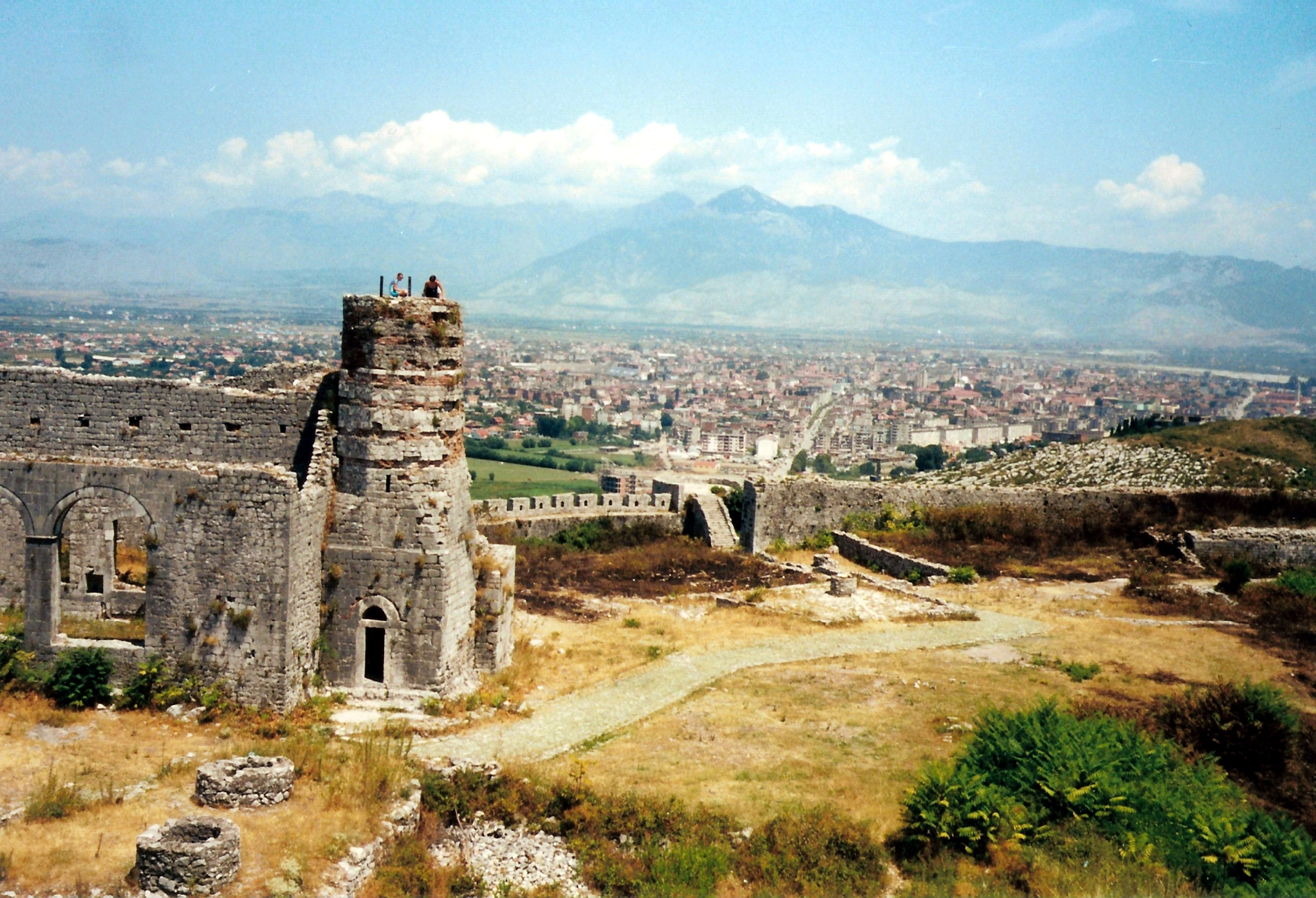
Ruined Fatih Sultan Mehmet Mosque within Rozafa fortress, Shkodër.

=== Northern Albania ===
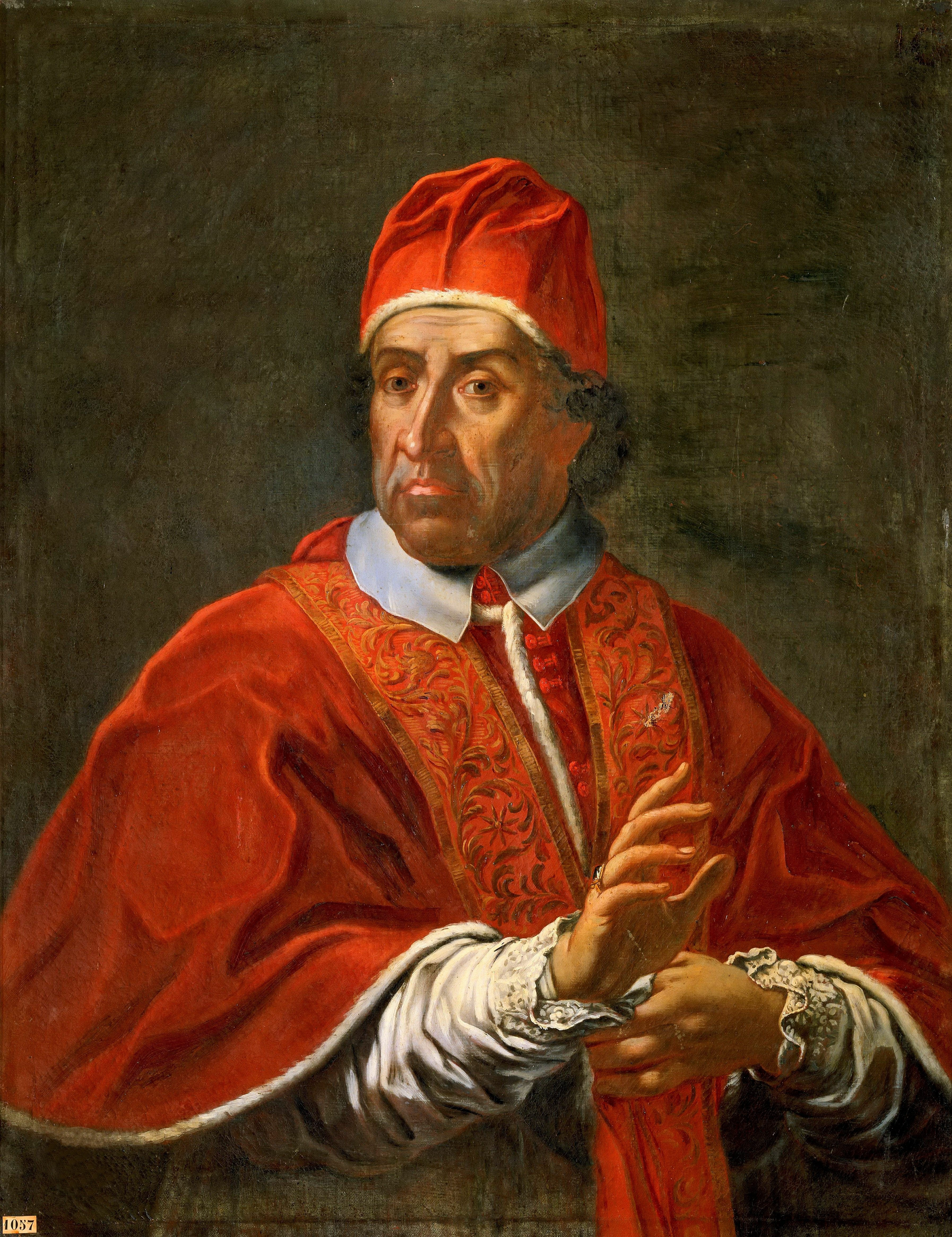
Pope Clement XI was the Pope from 1700 to 1721. Born to the noble Albani family of Italian and Albanian origin, and convened the Kuvendi i Arbënit to halt the decline of the Catholic population

The Ottoman conquest of certain northern cities from the Venetians happened separately to the initial conquest of Albania from local feudal lords. Cities such as Lezhë fell in 1478, Shkodër during 1478–79 and Durrës in 1501 with the bulk of their Christian population fleeing. Over the course of the sixteenth century, the urban populations of these cities became primarily Muslim. In the north, the spread of Islam was slower due to resistance from the Roman Catholic Church and the mountainous terrain which contributed to the curbing of Muslim influence in the 16th century. The Ottoman conquest and territorial reorganisation of Albania though affected the Catholic church as ecclesiastical structures were decimated. In the 16th century, the sanjak of Shkodër was reported as having a Muslim population standing at 4.5% of the total, while Dukagjini (sparsely populated at the time) had 0% and Prizreni had 1.9%.

Catholic Albanian rebellions, often in the context of Ottoman wars with Catholic powers of Venice and Austria in the seventeenth century resulted in severe reprisals against Catholic Albanians who had rebelled which accentuated conversion to Islam. In 1594, the Pope incited a failed rebellion among Catholic Albanians in the North, promising help from Spain. However the assistance did not come, and when the rebellion was crushed in 1596, Ottoman repression and heavy pressures to convert to Islam were implemented to punish the rebels. Steep decreases occurred during the 1630s-1670s where for example the number of Catholics in the diocese of Lezhë declined by 50%, whereas in the diocese of Pult Catholics went from being 20,000 to 4,045 adherents, with most converting to Islam and a few to Orthodoxy.

During the Great Austro-Turkish War, Albanian Catholic leaders Pjetër Bogdani and Toma Raspasani rallied Kosovo Albanian Catholics and Muslims to the pro-Austrian cause. After the war, when Kosovo did not end up part of the Habsburg empire, harsh reprisals followed. Large numbers of Catholic Albanians fled north where many "died, some of hunger, others of disease" around Budapest. After the flight of Serbs, the Pasha of Ipek forced Catholic Albanians in the North to move to the now depopulated plains of Southern Serbia, and forced them to convert to Islam there.

Conversion among Catholics in communities of Northern Albania involved males outwardly embracing Islam, often to avoid payment of taxes and other social pressures which in the Ottoman system targeted men while females of the household remained Christian. Christian wives were sought by converted Muslim men to retain a degree of Catholicism in the household. In 1703, pope Clement XI, himself of Albanian heritage, ordered a synod of local Catholic bishops that discussed stemming conversions to Islam which also agreed to deny communion to crypto-Catholics in Albania who outwardly professed Islam. Some Albanians maintained a Crypto-Christian culture, known as "Laramans". In Northern Albania, conflict with Slavs emerged as an additional factor toward conversion to Islam. Sharing the faith of Ottoman authorities allowed northern Albanians to become allies and equals in the imperial system and gain security against neighbouring Orthodox Slavs.

In some areas adjacent to the east of Northern Albania, Islam became the majority faith faster: for example, official Ottoman statistics of Nahiya of Tetova across the border with Macedonia (which had a mixed Albanian, Slavic Bulgarian, and Turkish population) show Muslim families outnumbering Christian families for the first time in 1545, where there are 2 more Muslim families than Christian families, and 38 of the Muslim families had recently converted from Christianity, while in Opojë in Kosovo near Prizren, Muslims are shown to have the majority in 1591.

=== Central Albania ===
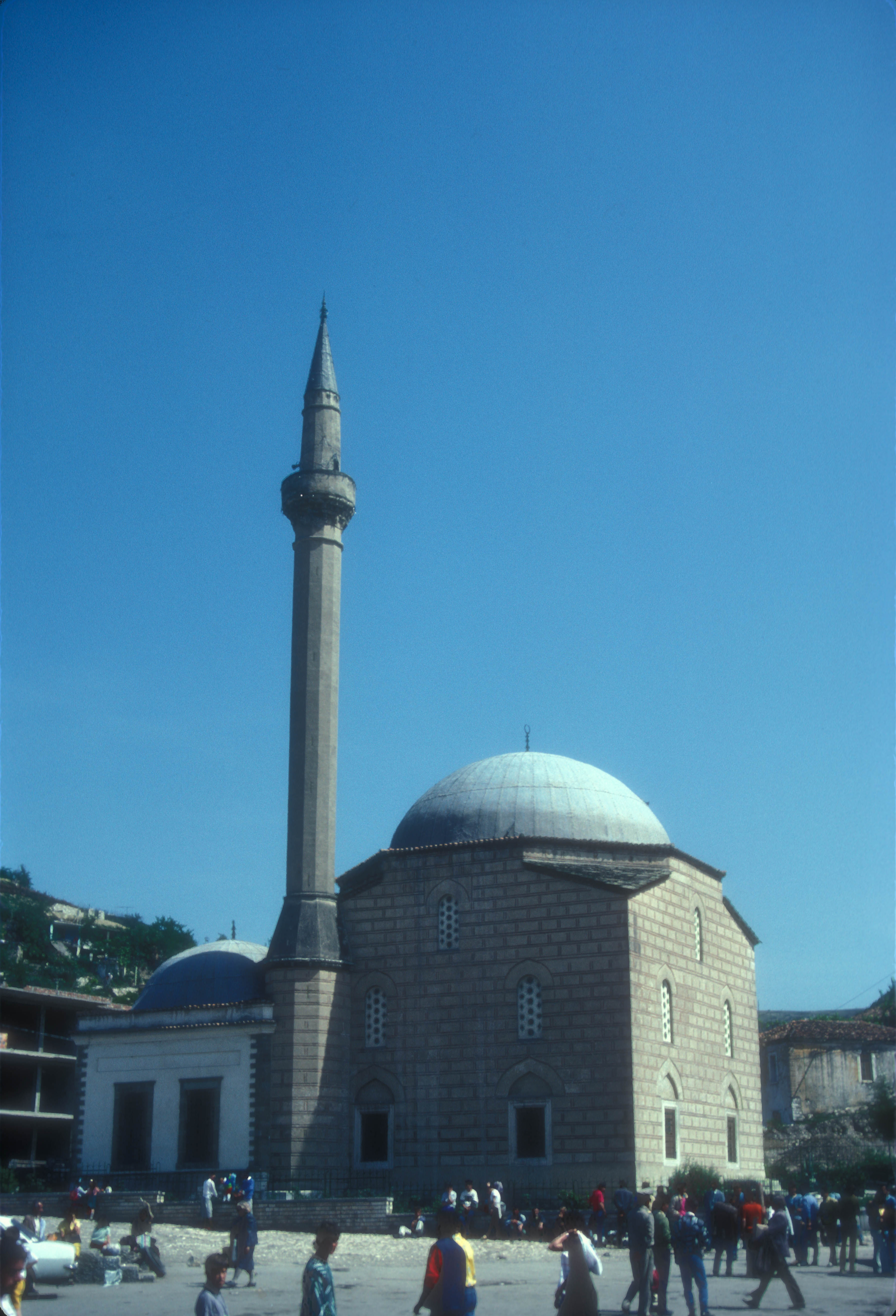
The 16th-century built Lead mosque in Berat

Consisting of plains between northern and southern Albania, central Albania was a hub on the old Via Egnatia, a road that facilitated direct Ottoman administrative control and Muslim religious influence. The conversion to Islam of most of central Albania has thus been attributed in large part to the role of geography in the socio-political and economic fortunes of the region.

Official Ottoman recognition of the Orthodox church resulted in the Orthodox population being tolerated until the late 18th century, and the traditionalism of the church's institutions slowed the process of conversion to Islam amongst Albanians. The Orthodox population of central and south-eastern Albania was under the ecclesiastical jurisdiction of the Orthodox Archbishopric of Ohrid, while south-western Albania was under the Patriarchate of Constantinople through the Metropolis of Ioannina. Differences between Christian Albanians of central Albania and archbishops of Ohrid led to conversions to Bektashi Islam, whose lighter emphasis on ritual observance made it more appealing than mainstream Islam.

In the early 16th century, the Albanian cities of Gjirokastër, Kaninë, Delvinë, Vlorë, Korçë, Këlcyrë, Përmet and Berat were still Christian and by the late 16th century, Vlorë, Përmet and Himarë were still Christian, while Gjirokastër became increasingly Muslim. In the earlier parts of the 16th century, the sanjak of Elbasan reportedly had a population that was 5.5% Muslim, more than any other Albanian-inhabited sanjak. In 1570, a concerted effort by Ottoman authorities to convert the restive Christian populations of Elbasan and Reka began. In the area around Durrës, it was reported by a Greek traveler that, due to Islamization, there were no longer any Orthodox Christians. Conversion to Islam in cities overall within Albania was slow during the 16th century as around only 38% of the urban population had become Muslim. The city of Berat from 1670 onward became mainly Muslim, its conversion being attributed in part to a lack of Christian priests able to provide religious services.

=== Southern Albania ===
In the 16th century, the sanjak of Vlora was found to be 1.8% Muslim while the sanjak of Ohrid was found to be 1.9% Muslim. It was mainly during the late eighteenth century, however, that Orthodox Albanians converted in large numbers to Islam due overwhelmingly to the Russo-Turkish wars of the period and events like the Russian instigated Orlov revolt (1770) that made the Ottomans view the Orthodox population as allies of Russia. As some Orthodox Albanians rebelled against the Ottoman Empire, the Porte responded by forcibly converting some Orthodox Albanians to Islam and by offering more economic incentives for conversion. By 1798, a massacre perpetrated against the coastal Orthodox Albanian villages of Shënvasil and Nivicë-Bubar by Ali Pasha, semi-independent ruler of the Pashalik of Yanina, led to another sizable wave of conversions of Orthodox Albanians to Islam. In the 19th century, Albania as a whole, and especially Southern Albania, was one of only two regions in the Ottoman Balkans, the other being Dobruja, that still saw widespread conversion from Christianity to Islam.

During this time conflict between newly converted Muslim Albanians and Orthodox Albanians occurred in certain areas. Examples include the coastal villages of Borsh attacking Piqeras in 1744, making some flee abroad to places such as southern Italy. Other areas such as 36 villages north of the Pogoni area converted in 1760, after which an attack on Orthodox Christian villages of the Kolonjë, Leskovik and Përmet areas left many settlements sacked and ruined. By the late eighteenth century, weakening control by the Ottoman government enabled local bandits and Muslim Albanian bands to raid Aromanian, Greek, and Orthodox Albanian settlements located within and outside of contemporary Albania. Within Albania those raids led to the destruction of various settlements, two of the largest being Vithkuq, mainly an Orthodox Albanian centre, and Moscopole (Albanian: Voskopojë), mainly an Aromanian centre, both with Greek literary, educational and religious culture. Those events pushed some Aromanians and Orthodox Albanians to migrate to such places as Macedonia and Thrace.

Some Orthodox individuals, known as neo-martyrs, attempted to stem the tide of conversion to Islam amongst the Orthodox Albanian population and were executed for doing so. Notable among them was Cosmas of Aetolia, (died 1779) a Greek monk and missionary who traveled and preached as far as Krujë, and opened many Greek schools, before being accused and executed as a supposed agent of the Russians. Cosmas advocated Greek education and spread of Greek language among illiterate Christian non-Greek speaking peoples so that they could understand the scriptures and liturgy and thereby remain Orthodox, while his spiritual message is revered today among Orthodox Albanians.

=== Other factors for conversion ===
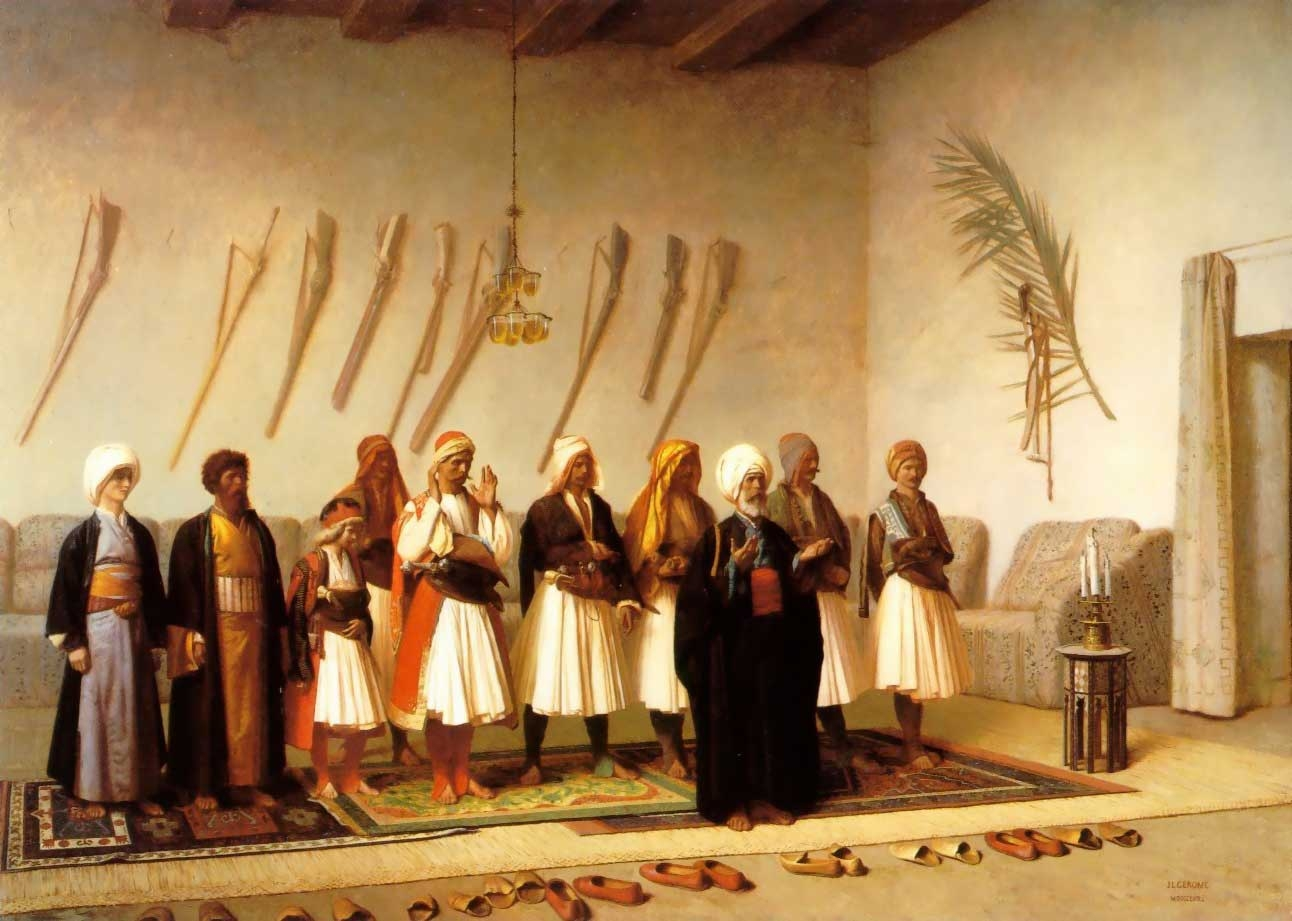
Prayer In The House Of An Arnaut Chief by Jean-Léon Gérôme (1857)

Other conversions such as those in the region of Labëria occurred due to ecclesiastical matters when for example during a famine the local bishop refused to grant a break in the fast to consume milk with threats of hell. Conversion to Islam also was undertaken for economic reasons which offered a way out of heavy taxation such as the jizya or poll tax and other difficult Ottoman measures imposed on Christians while opening up opportunities such as wealth accumulation and so on. In times of conflict between Muslims and Christians, local interests such as protection of family predominated over fighting causing the Ottomans to refuse Muslim Albanians the bearing of arms as often Christian Albanians would convert to Islam to obtain the right to arms and then employ them against the Ottomans. Other multiple factors that led to conversions to Islam were the poverty of the Church, illiterate clergy, a lack of clergy in some areas and worship in a language other than Albanian. Additionally the reliance of the bishoprics of Durrës and southern Albania upon the declining Archbishopric of Ohrid, due in part to simony weakened the ability of Orthodox Albanians in resisting conversion to Islam.

Crypto-Christianity also occurred in certain instances throughout Albania in regions such as Shpat amongst populations that had recently converted from Christian Catholicism and Orthodoxy to Islam. Gorë, a borderland region straddling contemporary north-eastern Albania and southern Kosovo, had a Slavic Orthodox population which converted to Islam during the latter half of the eighteenth century due to the abolition of the Serbian Patriarchate of Peć (1766) and subsequent unstable ecclesiastical structures. The Romani people entered Albania sometime in the fifteenth century and those that were Muslim became part of local Muslim Ottoman society.

=== Muslim Albanians and the wider Ottoman world ===
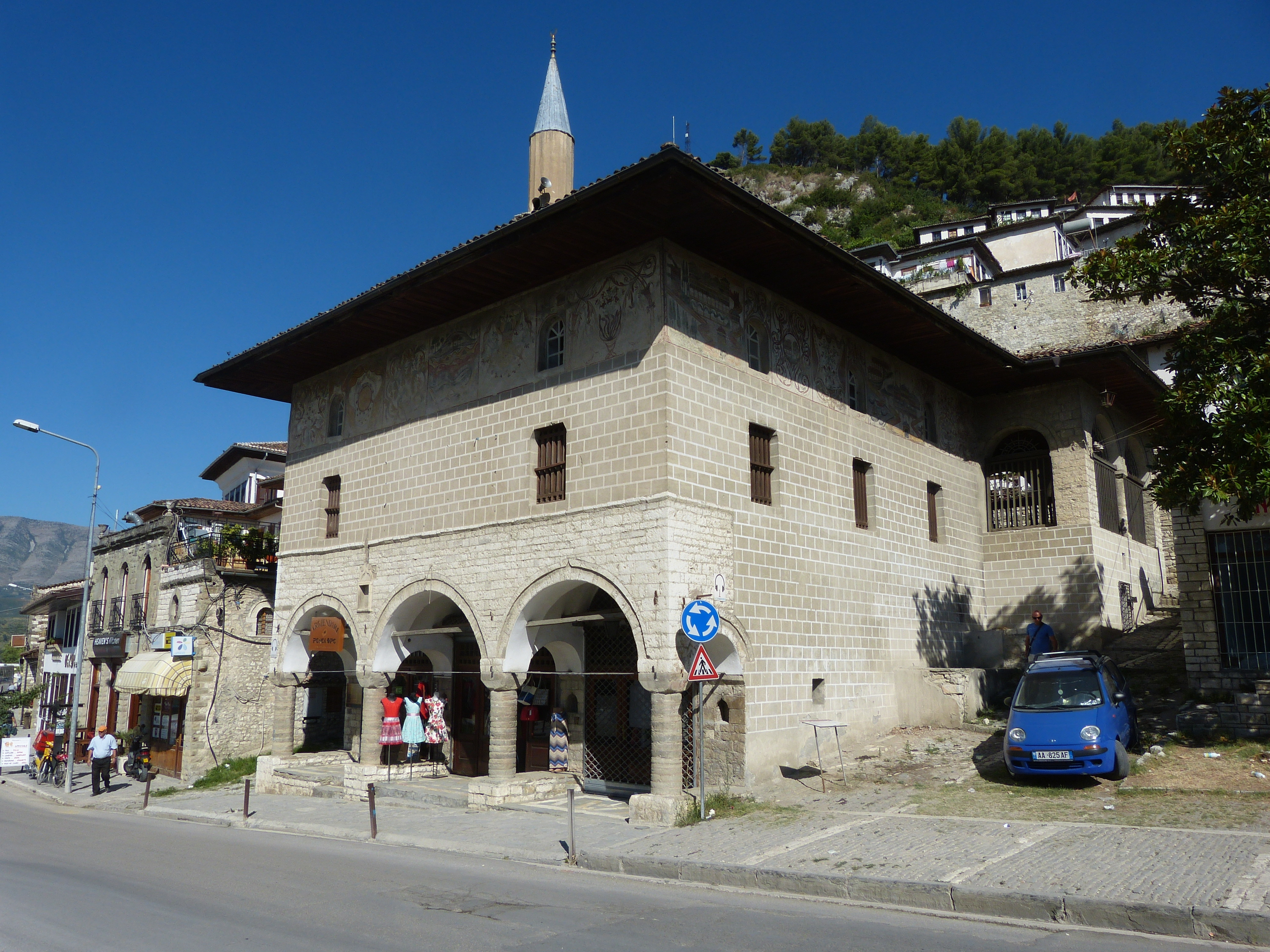
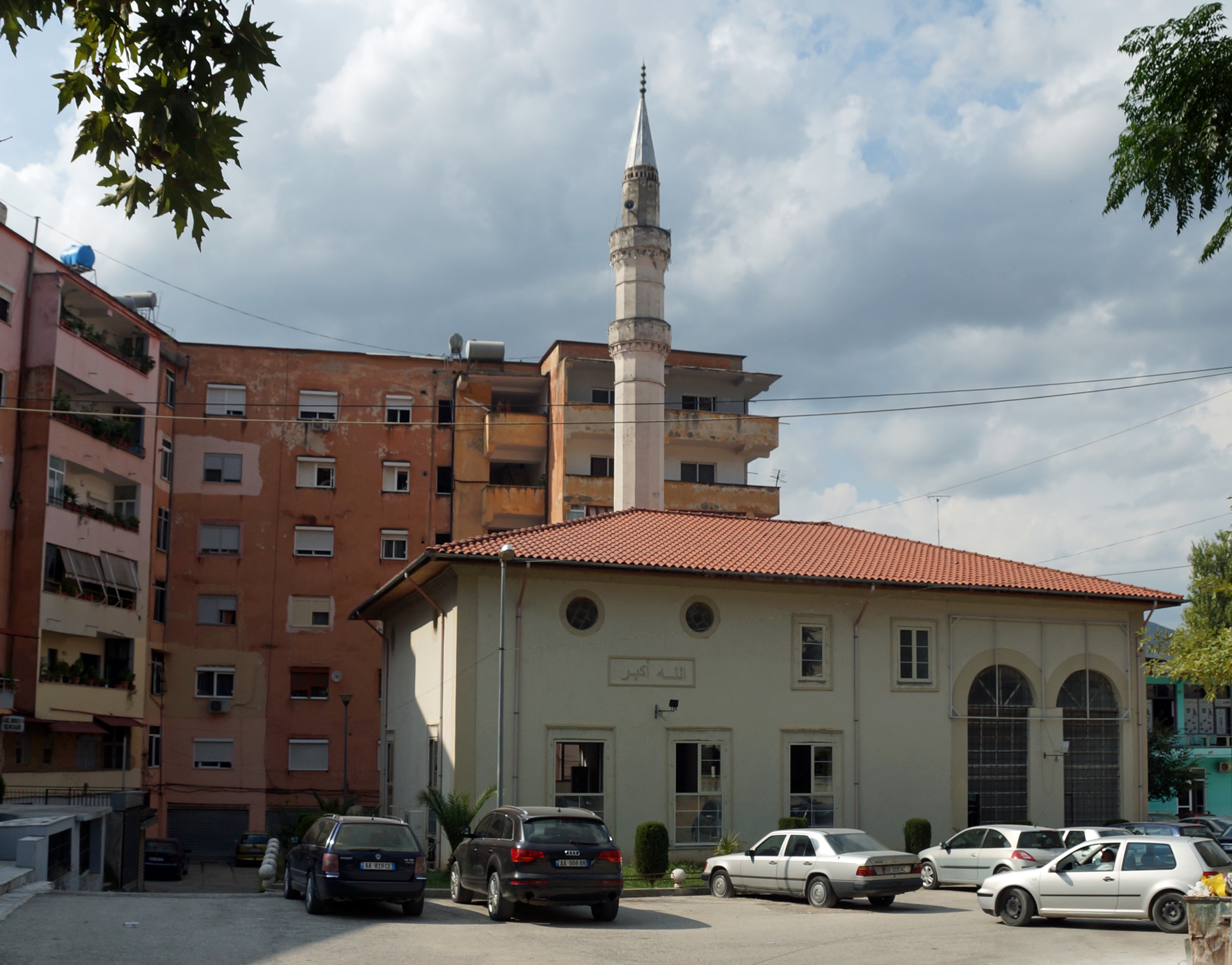
Bachelors' Mosque (left) and Hysen Pasha Mosque in Berat. (right).

Islam was closely associated with the state that made the Ottoman Empire an Islamic polity of which religious law coincided alongside state law with only Muslims having full civic rights while ethnic or national affiliations were disregarded. In the center and south by the end of the seventeenth century the urban centers had largely adopted the religion of the growing Muslim Albanian elite. The construction of mosques in Albania increased substantially from the 17th century onward with the advent of large numbers of Muslim Albanian converts. The Albanian old aristocratic ruling class converted to Islam to retain their lands. By the 18th century, a class of local aristocratic Albanian Muslim notables had emerged. The existence of that class as pashas and beys during that period, having military employment as soldiers and mercenaries while also able to join the Muslim clergy played an increasingly important role in Ottoman political and economic life that became an attractive career option for many Albanians. Depending on their role, these people in Muslim Albanian society attained a respectable position as they performed administrative tasks and maintained security in urban areas and sometimes were rewarded by the Ottoman state with high ranks and positions. Albanians, as such were also represented in sizable numbers at the imperial Ottoman court. Alongside Christians though, many Muslim Albanians were poor and partially serfs that worked on the land of the emerging landowning Ottoman Albanian elite while others found employment in business, as artisans and in other jobs.

Sunni Islam was promoted and protected by Ottoman governors and feudal society that resulted in support and spread of dervish Sufi orders considered more orthodox in the Balkans region. Foremost of these were the Bektashi order who were considered Sunni by means of association with shared legal traditions, though viewed as Shiite by everyday Muslims due to esoteric practices such as revering Ali, Hassan, Husein and other notable Muslim figures.

During Ottoman rule the Albanian population partially and gradually began to convert to Islam through the teachings of Bektashism in part to gain advantages in the Ottoman trade networks, bureaucracy and army. A few Albanians became part of the Ottoman ruling class and gained an elevated position where their influence eventually exceeded that of the Bosniaks. Many Albanians were recruited into the Ottoman Devşirme and Janissary with 42 Grand Viziers of the Ottoman Empire being of Albanian origin. The most prominent Albanians during Ottoman rule were Koca Davud Pasha, Hamza Kastrioti, Iljaz Hoxha, Köprülü Mehmed Pasha, Ali Pasha, Edhem Pasha, Ibrahim Pasha of Berat, Köprülü Fazıl Ahmed, Muhammad Ali of Egypt, Kara Mahmud Bushati and Ahmet Kurt Pasha. Within these contexts of serving in the military and as administrators, the relationship of Muslim Albanians with the Ottomans was at times one of cooperation and mutual advantage.

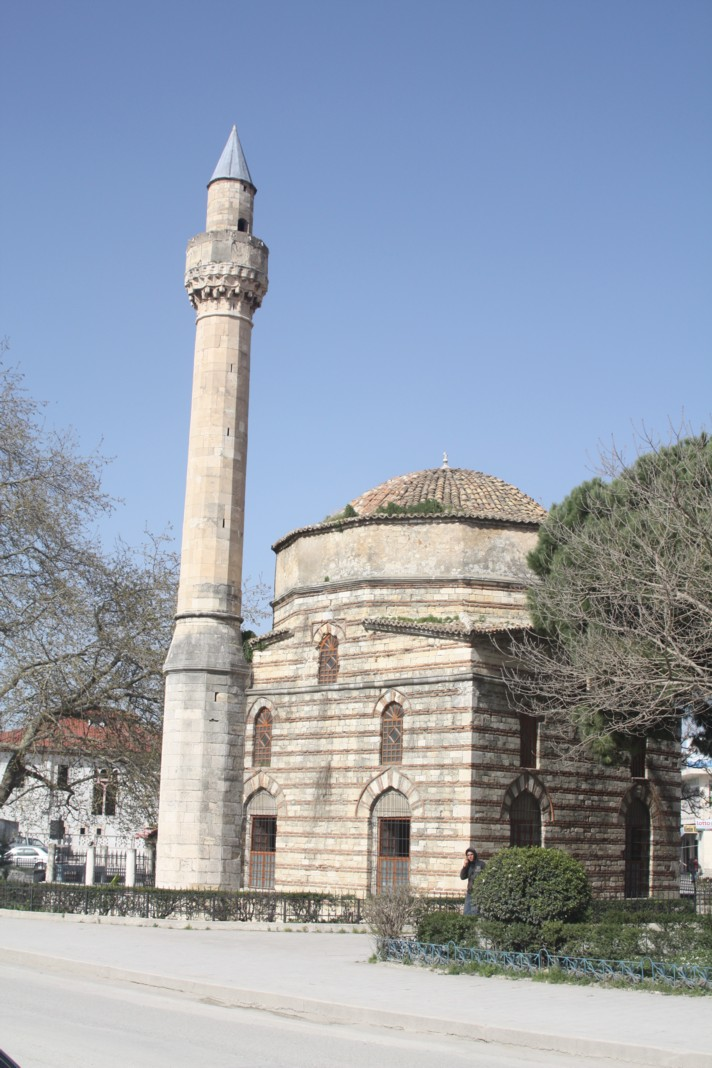
Muradie Mosque in Vlorë.

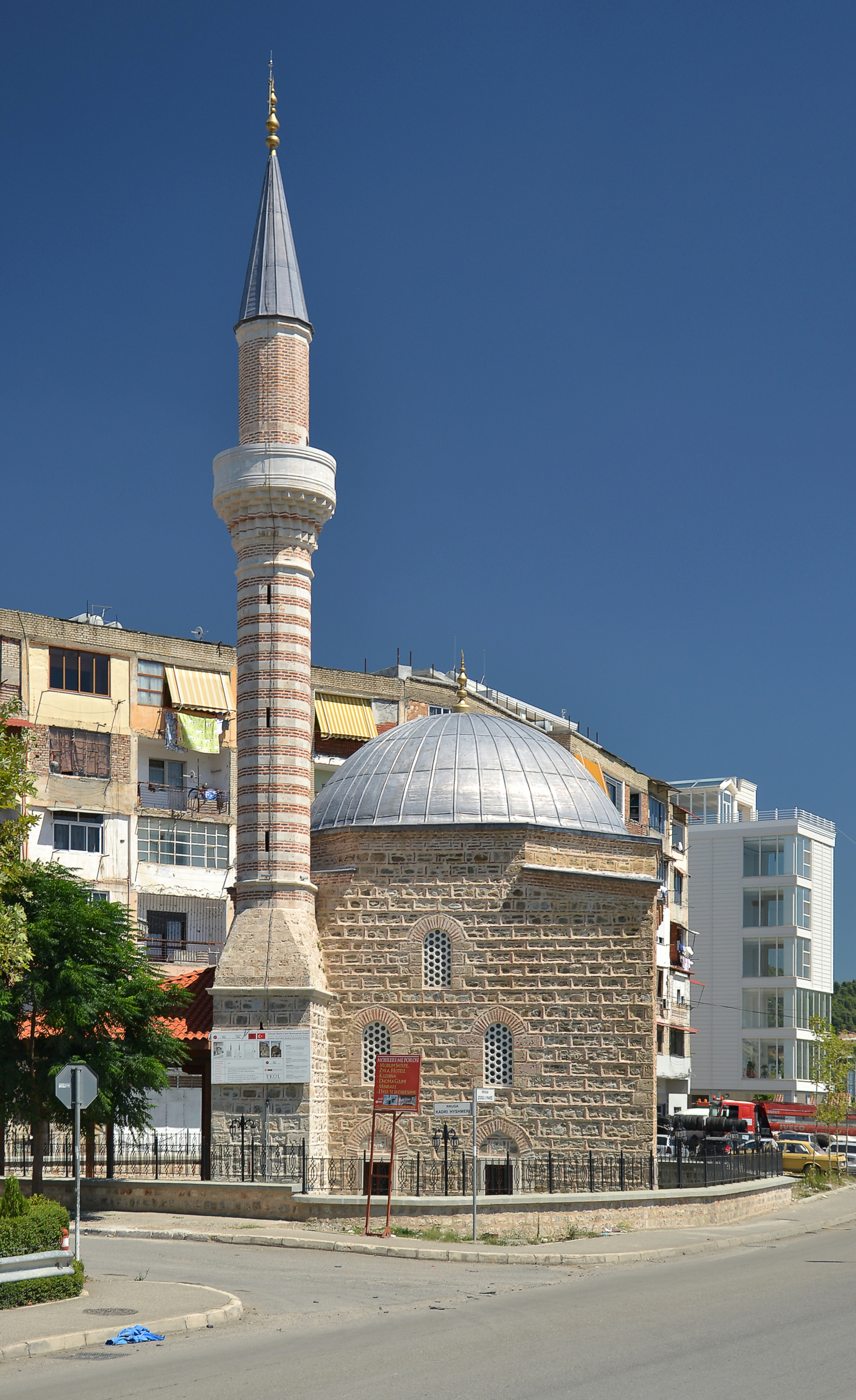
Naziresha Mosque in Elbasan.

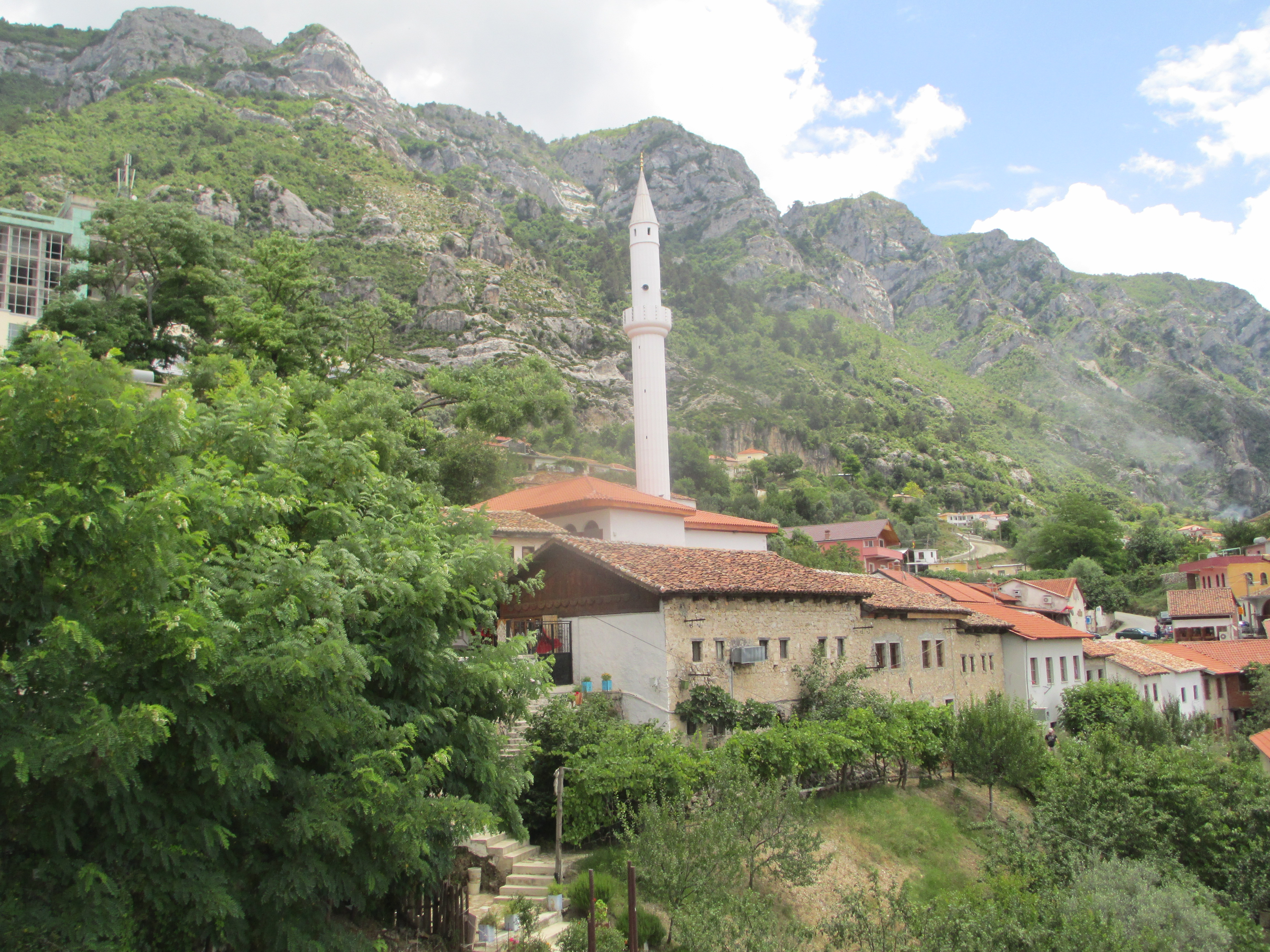
Bazaar Mosque in Krujë.

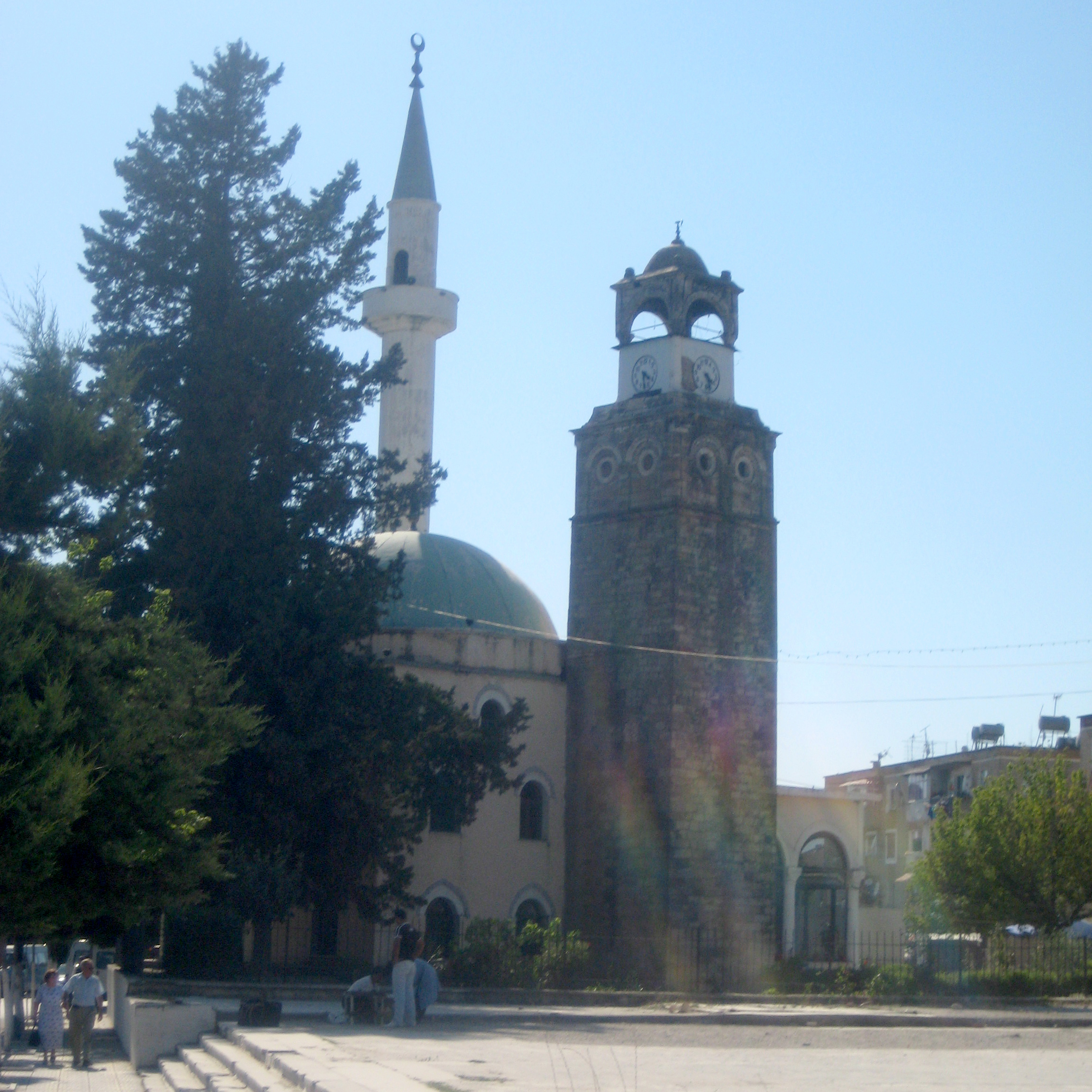
Clock Mosque in Peqin.

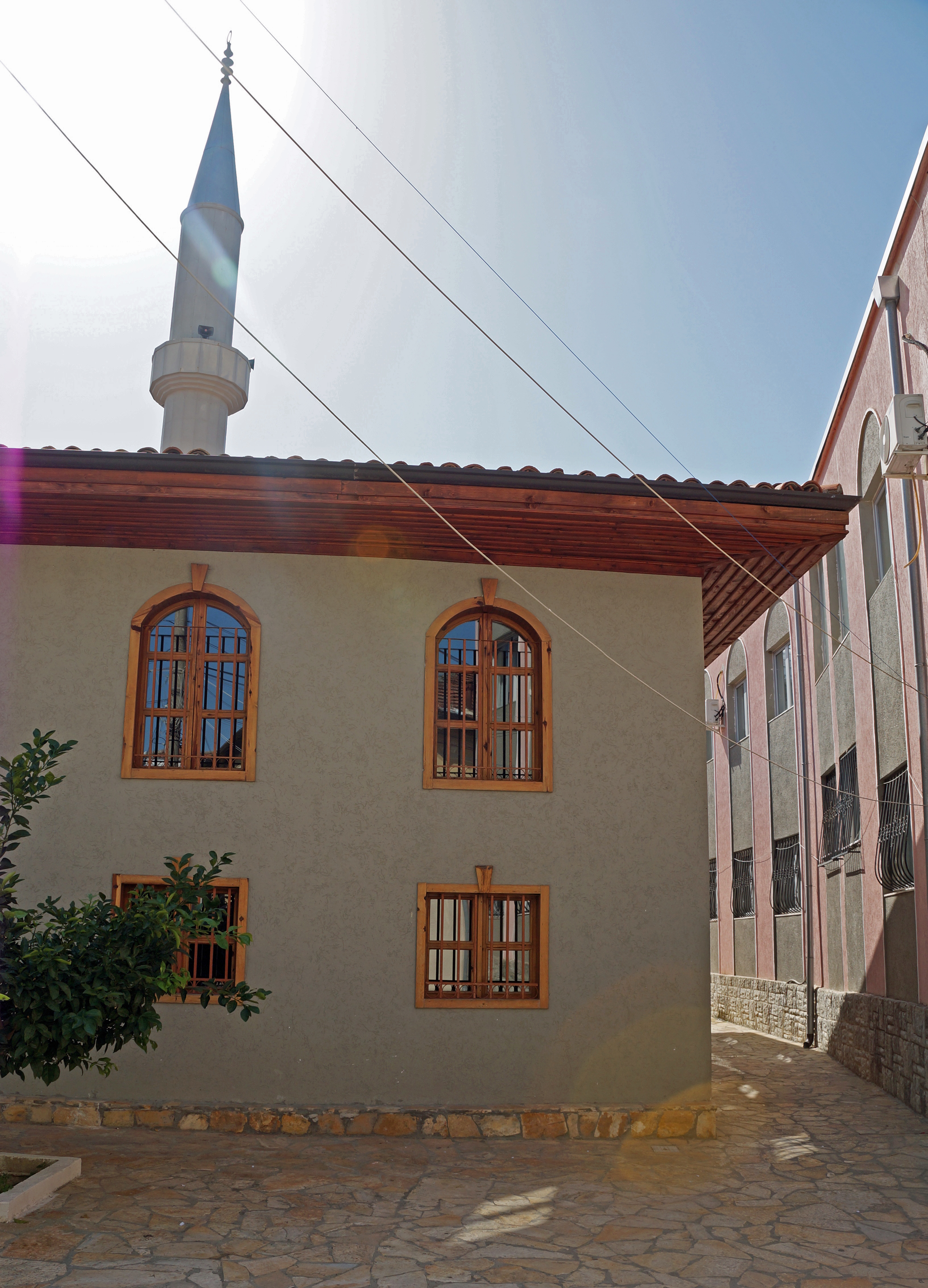
Fatih Mosque in Durrës.

=== Muslim denominations and sects ===
Besides those associated with Sunni Islam, the Muslims of Albania during the Ottoman period belonged to several Sufi Orders. The Qadiri order spread within urban areas of the seventeenth century and was linked with guilds of urban workers while in the 18th century, the Qadiri had spread into central Albania and in particular the mountainous Dibër region. The Qadiri contributed to the economic, and in the Dibër area, the socio-political milieu where they were based. The Halveti order who competed with the Bektashis for adherents and based in the south and northeast of Albania. Other Sufi orders were the Rufai and the Melami and so on. The most prominent of these in Albania were and still are the Bektashis, a mystic Dervish order belonging to Shia Islam that came to Albania during the Ottoman period, brought first by the Janissaries in the 15th century. The spread of Bektashism amongst the Albanian population though occurred during the 18th and mainly early 19th centuries, especially in the domains of Ali Pasha who is thought to have been a Bektashi himself. Sufi dervishes from places afar like Khorasan and Anatolia arrived, proselytized, gained disciples and in time a network of tekkes was established that became centres of Sufism in regions such as Skrapar and Devoll. Some of the most prominent tekkes in Albania were in settlements such as Gjirokastër, Melçan, Krujë and Frashër. Of the Bektashi order by the early 20th century, Albanians formed a sizable amount of its dervishes outside the Balkans, even at the tekke of Sufi saint Haji Bektash in Anatolia and in Egypt. Sufi orders, in particular the Bektashis, associate Christian saints and their local shrines with Sufi holy men, creating a synthesis and syncretism of religious observance and presence. For Albanian converts to Islam, Bektashism with its greater religious freedoms and syncretism was viewed at times as a more appealing option than Sunni Islam. The Bektashi sect is considered heretical by conservative Muslims. Traditionally Bektashis are found in sizable numbers within southern Albania and to a lesser extent in central Albania, while the rest of the Muslim population belongs to Sunni Islam.

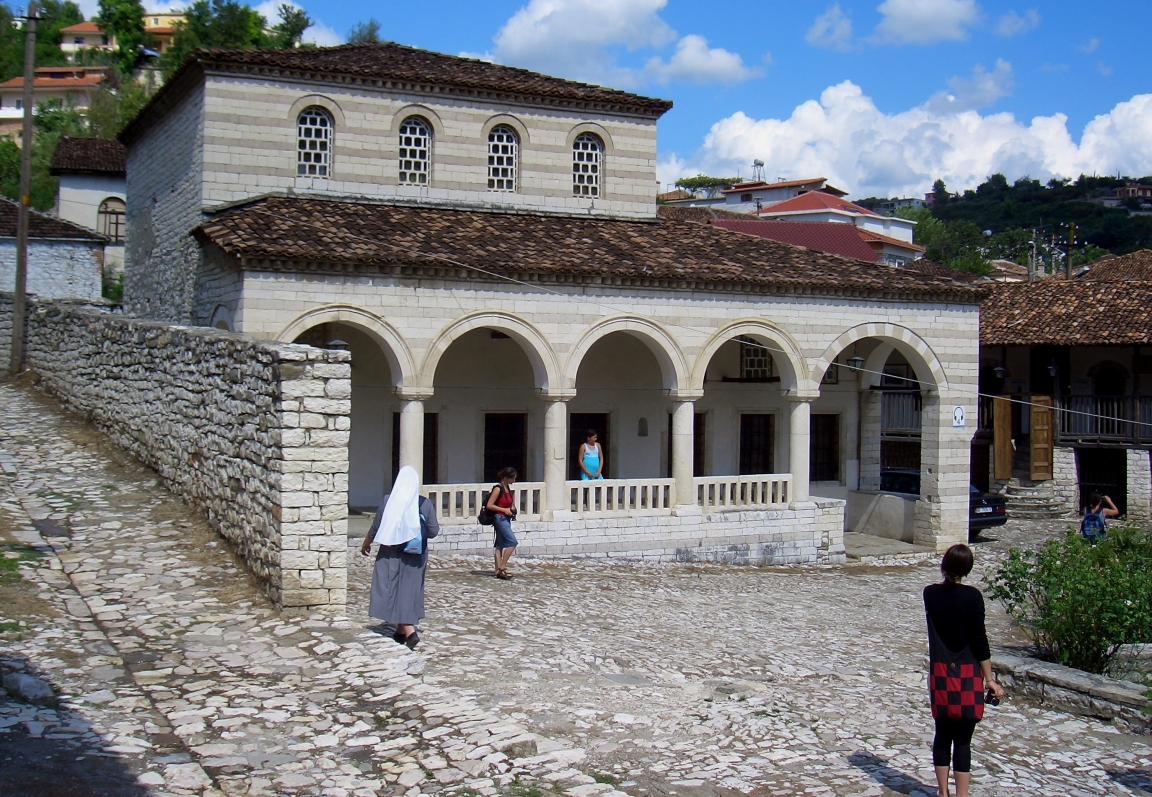
Teqe in Berat of the Sufi Halveti order (built 1782).

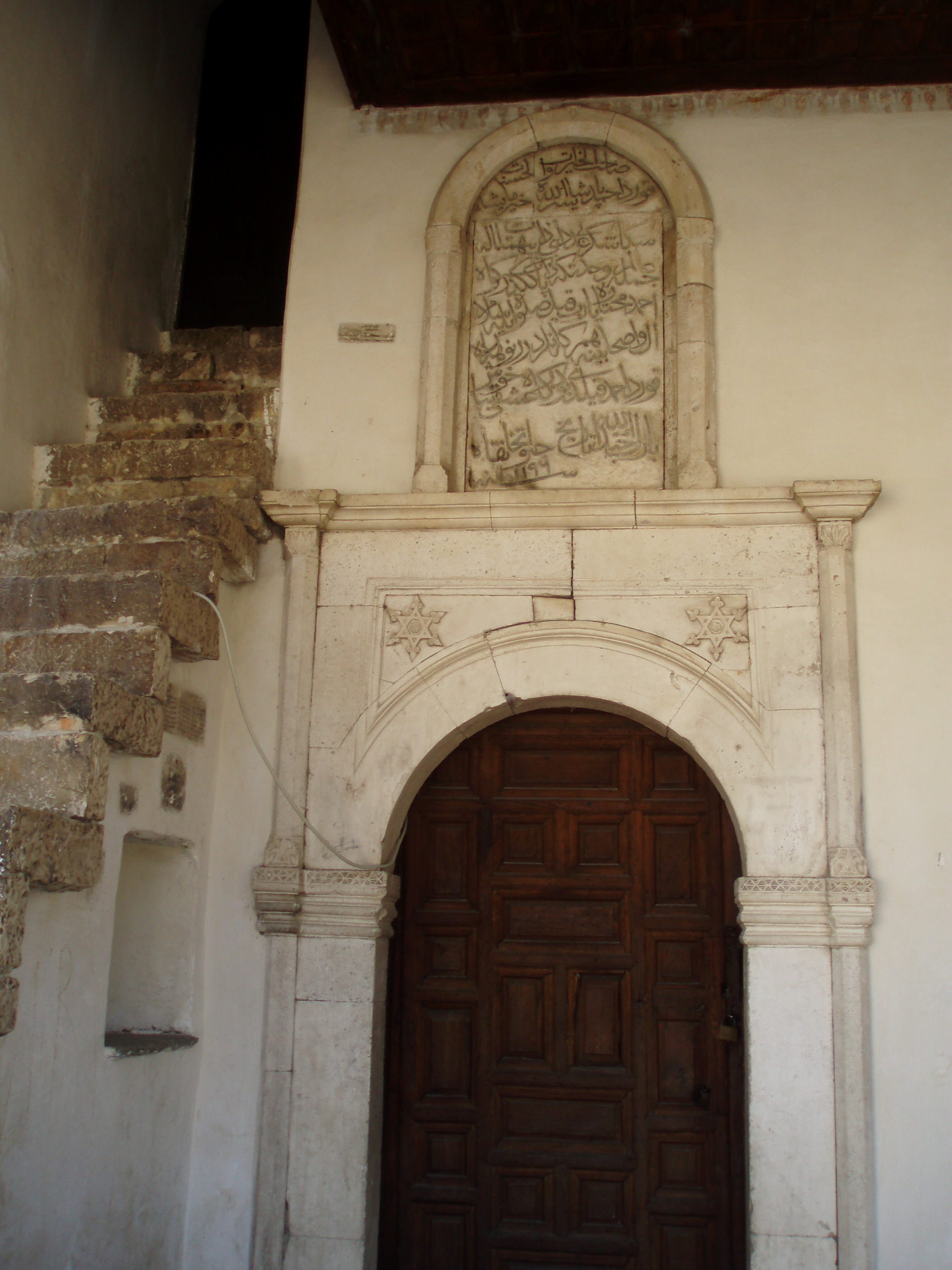
Arabic script inscription above door at Halveti teqe, Berat.

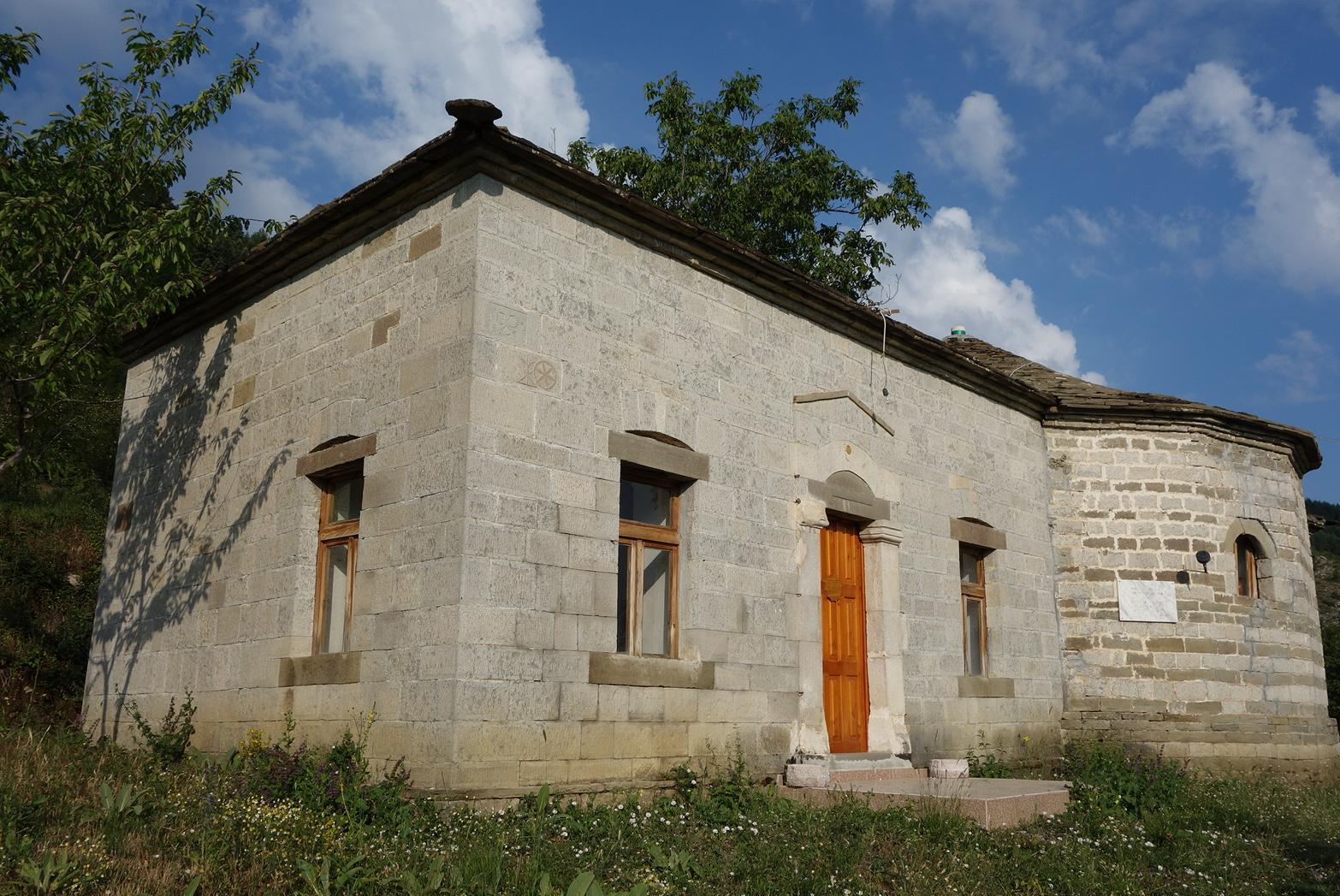
Bektashi Teqe in Frashër.

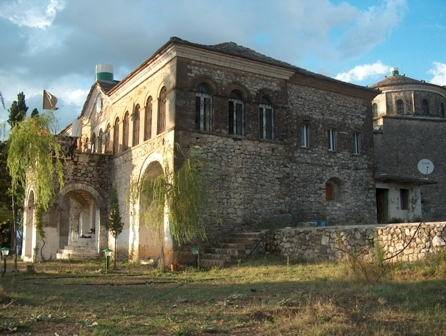
Melani teqe of the Bektashi in Gjirokastër.

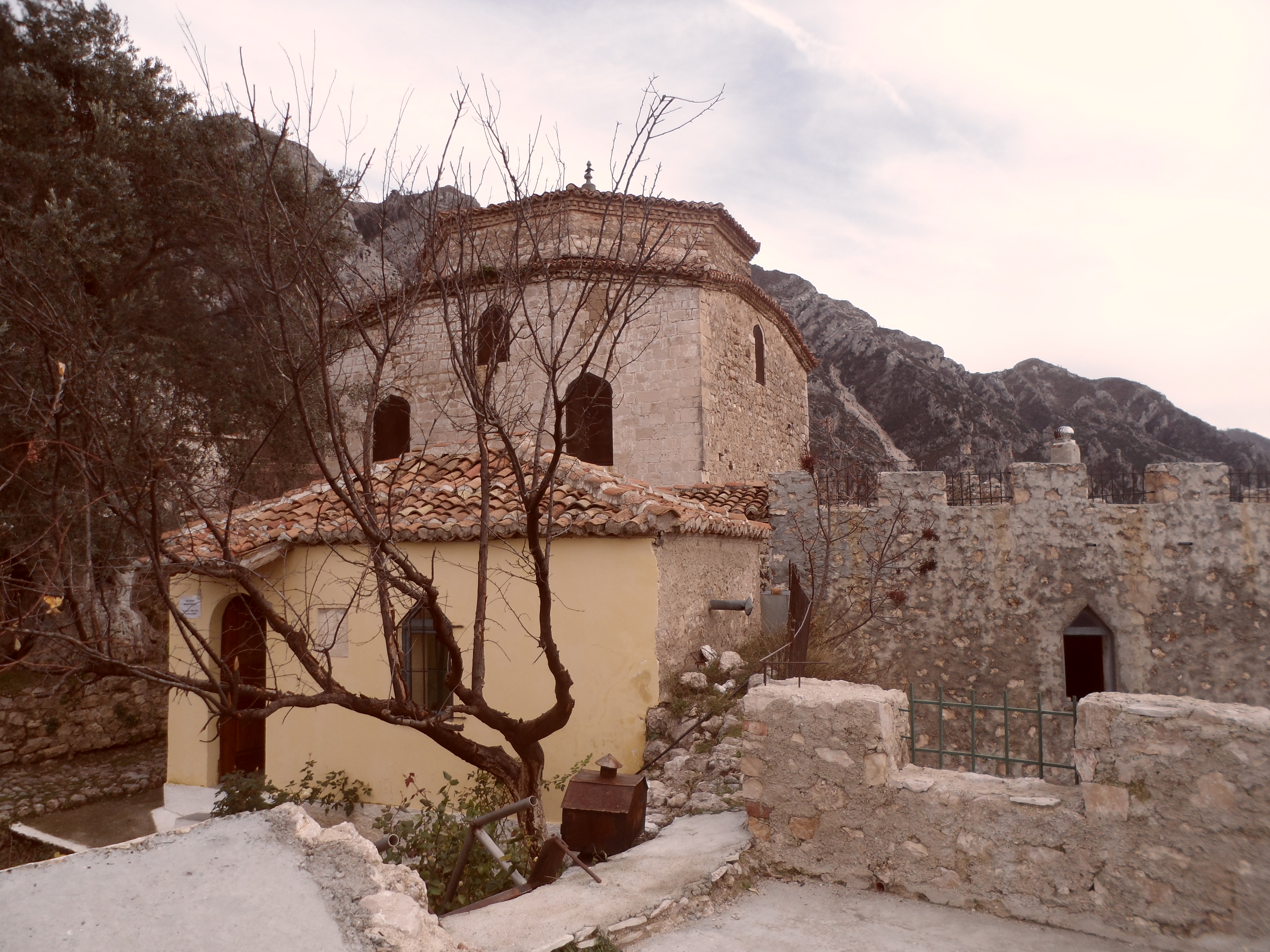
Dollma Teqe in Krujë.

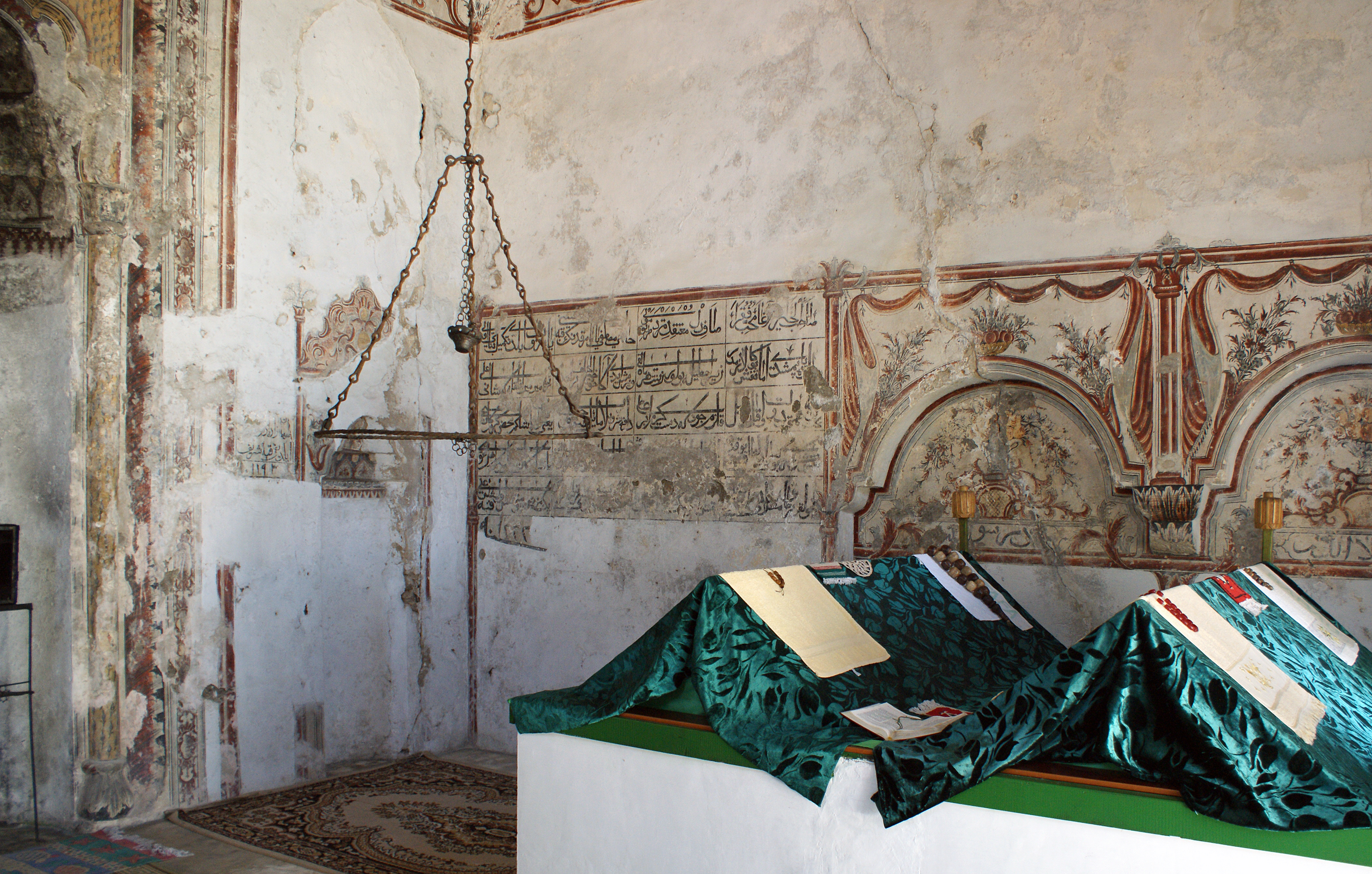
Interior of Dollma teqe with Sufi saints tombs in background, Krujë.

=== Social and cultural change ===
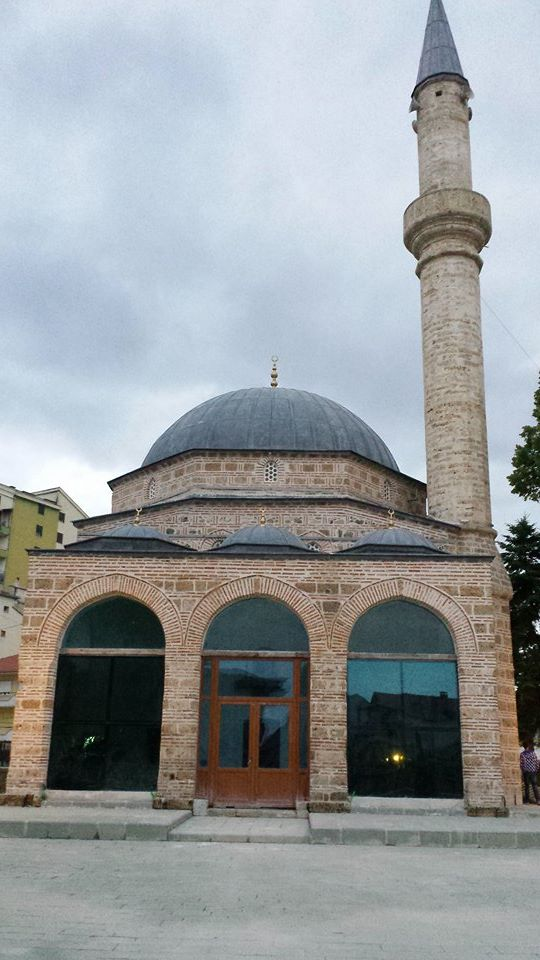
Mirahori Mosque in Korçë

The Ottoman conquest also brought social, cultural and linguistic changes into the Albanian-speaking world. From the fifteenth century onward words from Ottoman Turkish entered the Albanian language. A corpus of poets and other Muslim Albanian authors wrote in Ottoman Turkish, Arabic, Persian or in the Albanian language in Arabic script (aljamiado) encompassing narrative prose, poetry, reflective works on religion and socio-political situations and so on. Prominent amongst these authors were Yahya bey Dukagjini, Haxhi Shehreti or bejtexhinj poets like Nezim Frakulla, Muhamet Kyçyku, Sulejman Naibi, Hasan Zyko Kamberi, Haxhi Ymer Kashari and others. Apart from Elbasan founded (1466) around a fortress, towns and cities in Albania underwent change as they adopted Ottoman architectural and cultural elements. Some settlements with the construction of buildings related to religion, education and social purposes like mosques, madrassas, imarets and so on by the Ottoman Muslim Albanian elite became new urban centres like Korçë, Tiranë and Kavajë. Meanwhile, older urban centres such as Berat attained mosques, hamams (Ottoman bathhouses), madrasas (Muslim religious schools), coffee houses, tekes and became known for poets, artists and scholarly pursuits. Unlike Kosovo or Macedonia, architecturally Albania's Ottoman Muslim heritage was more modest in number, though prominent structures are the Mirahori Mosque in Korçë (built 1495–96), Murad Bey Mosque in Krujë (1533–34), Lead Mosque in Shkodër (1773–74), Et'hem Bey Mosque in Tiranë (begun 1791–94; finished 1820–21) and others.

Conversion from Christianity to Islam for Albanians also marked a transition from Rum (Christian) to Muslim confessional communities within the Ottoman millet system that collectively divided and governed peoples according to their religion. The Ottomans were nonetheless aware of the existence of Muslim Albanians and used terms like Arnavud (اروانيد) extensively as an ethnic marker to address the shortcomings of the usual millet religious terminology to identify people in Ottoman state records. In Ottoman Turkish, the country was referred to as Arnavudluk (آرناوودلق). Also a new and generalised response by Albanians based on ethnic and linguistic consciousness to this new and different Ottoman world emerging around them was a change in ethnonym. The ethnic demonym Shqiptarë, derived from Latin connoting clear speech and verbal understanding gradually replaced Arbëresh/Arbënesh amongst Albanian speakers between the late 17th and early 18th centuries.

== Legacy ==
=== Albanian societal views of the Islamisation of Albania ===
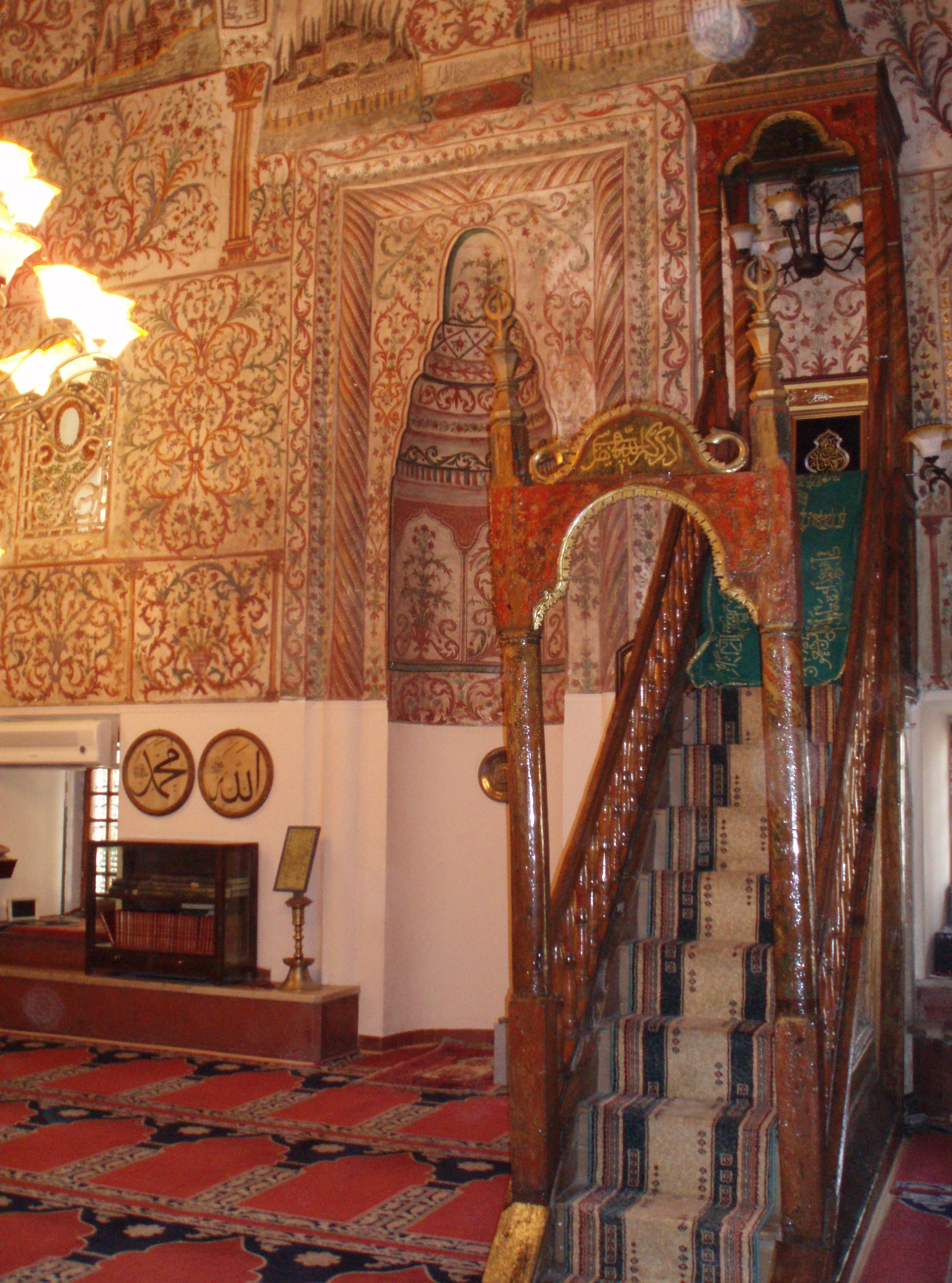
Minbar within richly decorated interior of Et'hem Bey Mosque, Tiranë.

Islam and the Ottoman legacy has also been a topic of conversation among wider Albanian society. Islam and the Ottomans are viewed by many Albanians as the outcome of jihad, anti-Christian violence, Turkification and within those discourses Albania's sociopolitical problems are attributed as the outcome of that legacy. Some members from the Muslim community, while deemphasizing the Ottoman past, have responded to these views by criticizing what they perceive as prejudice toward Islam.

Among Albanian intellectuals and other notable Albanians in the wider Balkans, discussions and at times debates about Islam, its legacy and role within Albania have occurred. Within these discourses, controversial Orientalist, racist and biological terminology has been used by some Albanian intellectuals when discussing Islam, its legacy and contemporary role among Albanians.

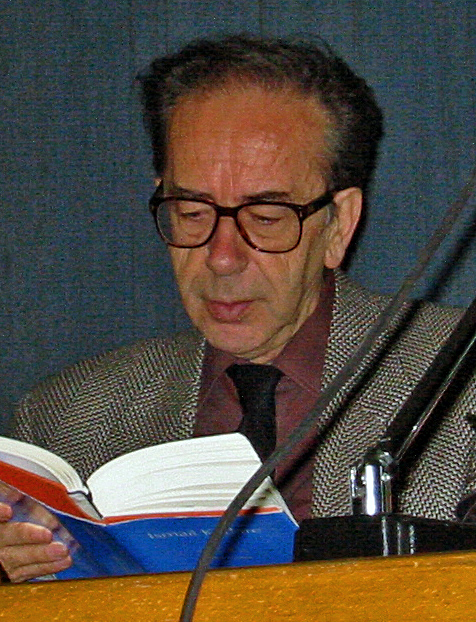
Ismail Kadare

Prominent in those discussions were written exchanges in newspaper articles and books between novelist Ismail Kadare of Gjirokastër and literary critic Rexhep Qosja, an Albanian from the former Yugoslavia in the mid-2000s. Kadare asserted that Albania's future lay with Europe due to its ancient European roots and Christian traditions, while Qosja contended that Albanian identity was both a blend of Western (Christian) and Eastern (Islam) cultures and often adaptable to historical contexts. Piro Misha wrote that the Islamisation of Albanians during the 17th and 18th centuries as being "two of the darkest centuries in the modern history of Albania". Misha also maintained that due to that experience "Albania was more influenced by Turco-Oriental culture than perhaps any other country in the region", though he notes that Albanian Muslims were only Muslim group "in European Turkey who made common cause with their Christian compatriots to fight against the government in Constantinople."

In a 2005 speech given in Britain by Albanian President Alfred Moisiu, he referred to Islam in Albania as having a "European face" since it is "shallow" and "if you dig a bit in every Albanian, he can discover his Christian core". The Muslim Forum of Albania responded to those and Kadare's comments and referred to them as "racist" containing "Islamophobia" and being "deeply offensive". Following trends dating back from the communist regime, the post-communist Albanian political establishment continues to approach Islam as the faith of the Ottoman "invader". Some Albanian writers have also claimed that the Albanian dedication to Islam was superficial and those arguments have been popular within the Orthodox and Catholic Albanian communities. In debates over Albanian school textbooks during which some historians have asked for offensive content regarding Turks to be removed, some Christian Albanian historians countered angrily by referring to negative experiences of the Ottoman period and wanting Turkey to seek redress for the "invasion" of Albania and the Islamisation of Albanians.

=== Religious establishment views of the Islamisation of Albania ===
The official religious Christian and Muslim establishments and their clergy hold diverging views of the Ottoman period and conversion of Islam by Albanians. Both Catholic and the Orthodox clergy interpret the Ottoman era as a repressive one that contained anti-Christian discrimination and violence, while Islam is viewed as foreign challenging Albanian tradition and cohesion. The conversion to Islam by Albanians is viewed by both Catholic and Orthodox clergy as falsification of Albanian identity, though Albanian Muslims are interpreted as innocent victims of Islamisation. Albanian Sunni Muslim clergy however views the conversion of Albanians as a voluntary process, while sidelining religious controversies associated with the Ottoman era. Sufi Islam in Albania interprets the Ottoman era as promoting a distorted form of Islam that was corrupted within a Sunni Ottoman polity that persecuted them. Christian clergy consider Muslim Albanians as part of the wider Albanian nation and Muslim clergy do not express derision to people who did not become Muslim in Albania. Christian identities in Albania have been forged on being in a minority position, at times with experiences of discrimination they have had historically in relation to the Muslim majority. Meanwhile, Muslim clergy in Albania highlight the change of fortune the demise of the Ottoman Empire brought with the political empowerment of Balkan Christians making Muslims a religious minority in contemporary times.

=== Islamisation of Albania within scholarship ===
Within scholarship in contemporary times, the conversion of Albanians and the legacy of Islam within Albania is a contested topic. Communist era and contemporary Albanian scholars with nationalist perspectives interpret the Ottoman period as negative and downplay the conversion to Islam as having had barely any benefits to Albanians in a sociocultural and religious sense. In 1975, Hasan Kaleshi challenged these mainly "negative" views of the period of Islamization. Kaleshi's position, later supported by Elsie and Schmidt-Neke, was that the Ottoman conquest and conversion to Islam by Albanians averted Hellenization and Slavification the same way that the Slavic invasions of the 6th century halted the romanization process of the progenitors of the Albanians. He maintained that though recognised within the millet system as Muslims only, the partial Islamisation of the population halted the assimilation process occurring through churches and the influence of landlords of the Greeks, Latins and Slavs. Additionally, the Islamisation of Albanians also resulted in the extension of the Balkan Albanian settlement area through either population movements or the assimilation of other Muslim non-Albanian elements during Ottoman rule. Kaleshi's thesis has, over time, been distorted by some Albanians who argue that Albanians converted to Islam with the aim of keeping their national and ethnic identity, instead of Albanian identity being preserved as a consequence of Islamisation and Ottoman rule; this has been called an "inversion" of Kaleshi's argument.

== See also ==
- Muslim Community of Albania
- Bektashi Order
- Bektashism and folk religion
- History of Ottoman Albania
- Religion in Albania
- Christianity in Albania
- Islamization of Bosnia and Herzegovina
