= Rumelia =

Term for the Balkans under Ottoman rule

Coordinates: 41.0000°N 21.3333°E

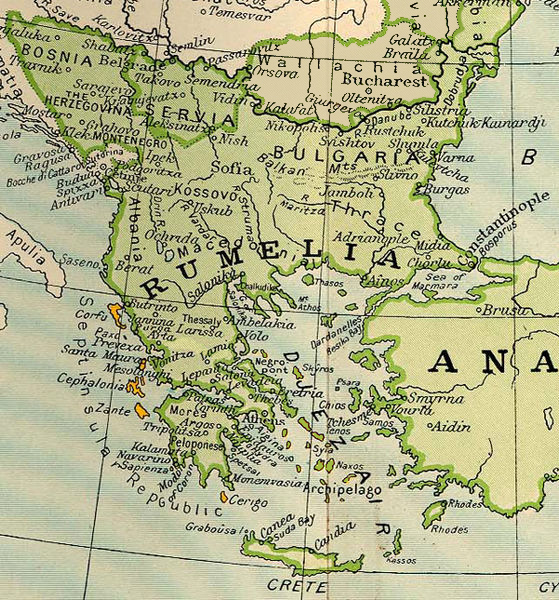
Map of the historical region of Rumelia in 1801

Rumelia (Ottoman Turkish: روم ايلى, romanized: Rum İli, lit. 'Land of the Romans'; (Note: At the time meaning Eastern Orthodox Christians and more specifically Christians from the Byzantine rite) Turkish: Rumeli; Greek: Ρωμυλία) was a historical region in Southeastern Europe that was administered by the Ottoman Empire, roughly corresponding to the Balkans. In its wider sense, it was used to refer to all Ottoman possessions and vassals in Europe. These would later be geopolitically classified as "the Balkans", although Hungary, Romania and Moldova are sometimes excluded. In contemporary English sources, Rumelia was known as the European territory occupied by the Turkish Ottoman Empire.

== Etymology ==
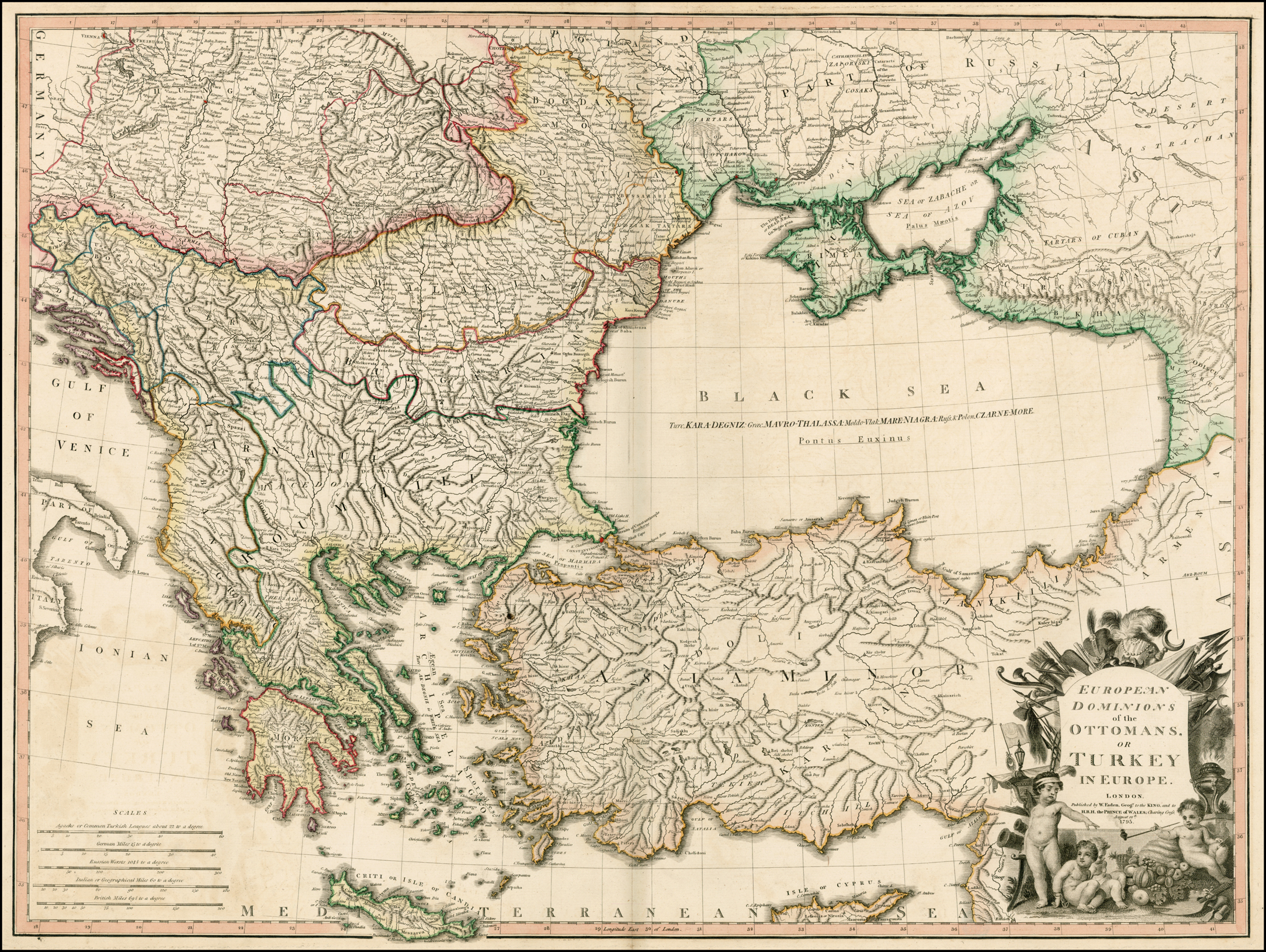
Map of European Dominions of the Ottoman empire in 1795

In this context, Rûm means "Romans" and ėli means "land", hence Rumelia (Ottoman Turkish: روم ايلى, romanized: Rūm-ėli; Turkish: Rumeli) literally means “Land of the Romans” in Ottoman Turkish. The term referred to territories of the Ottoman Empire in Europe that had formerly belonged to the Byzantine Empire (the empire known to its own rulers and subjects as the Roman Empire), whose citizens styled themselves Rhomaioi ("Romans"). Although Greek became the predominant administrative and liturgical language, the empire was multiethnic and its Roman identity was civic and imperial rather than purely linguistic or ethnic.

In medieval Islamic and Ottoman usage, Rûm denoted the lands and peoples of the Roman Empire centred on Constantinople, not the medieval Latin West. The Seljuks called Anatolia "the land of Rûm" after its gradual conquest from Byzantium following the Battle of Manzikert (1071). Their Anatolian polity was known to contemporaries as the Sultanate of Rum, meaning a sultanate established in the lands of the Romans; it was centred in central Anatolia until the defeat at the Battle of Köse Dağ (1243), after which it fragmented into the Anatolian beyliks.

With the Ottoman expansion across Anatolia and into the Balkans, and especially after the fall of Constantinople in 1453, Rumeli came to apply primarily to the empire’s European provinces in the Balkans. The region remained largely Christian for centuries, while processes of Islamisation affected some populations, including Albanians, Bosniaks and certain communities among Greeks, Serbs, Bulgarians and Vlachs.

The term "Roman" for the Byzantine polity also appears in Western sources. Latin documents, including those from Genoa, frequently used Romania as a name for the Byzantine Empire during the Middle Ages.

The name survives in several Balkan languages: Albanian: Rumelia; Bulgarian: Румелия, romanized: Rumeliya; Greek: Ρωμυλία, romanized: Romylía, and Ρούμελη, Roúmeli; Macedonian: Румелија, romanized: Rumelija; Serbo-Croatian: Румелија, Rumelija; and Romanian: Rumelia. Many grand viziers, viziers, pashas and beylerbeyis were of Rumelian origin.

== Geography ==
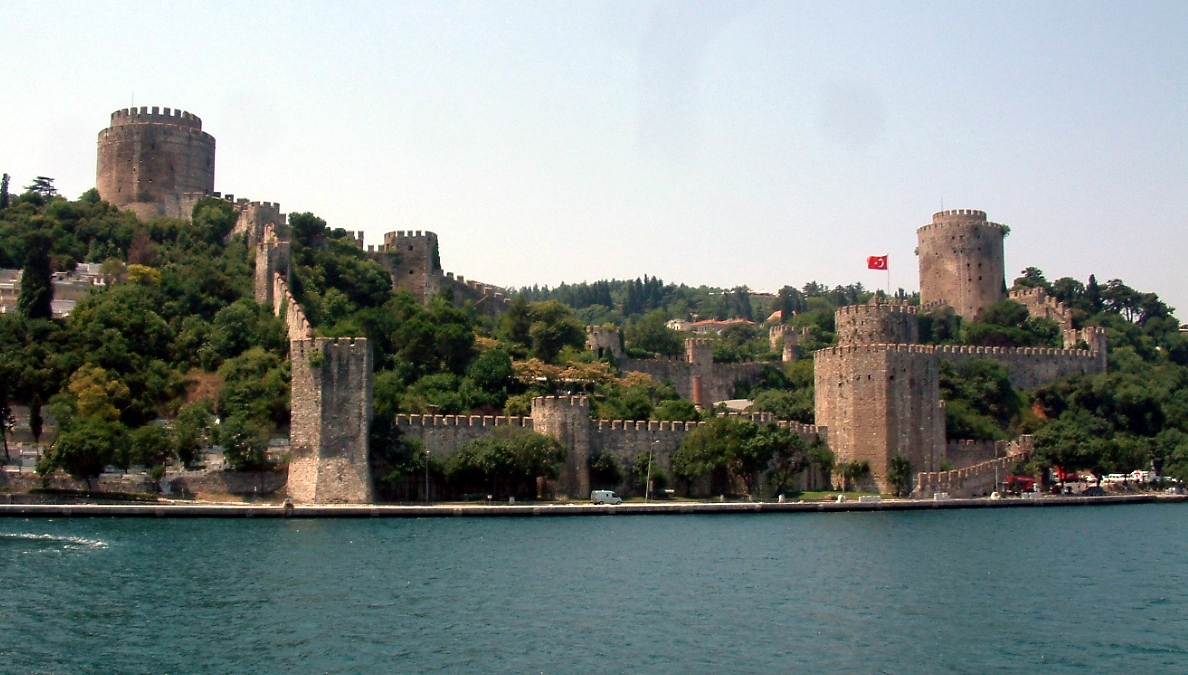
Rumeli Hisarı (Rumelian Fortress, 1452) on the European shore of the Bosphorus Strait in Istanbul

Rumelia comprised the Ottoman lands in the Balkans, notably Thrace, Macedonia and much of Moesia—covering most of present-day Bulgaria, North Macedonia, Western Thrace in Greece, and the Turkish part of Eastern Thrace. It was bounded to the north by the Sava and Danube, to the west by the Adriatic, and to the south by the Morea. The beylerbey’s seat was first at Plovdiv (Filibe) and later at Sofia. The name "Rumelia" was ultimately applied to a province composed of central Albania and northwestern Macedonia, with Bitola being the main town.

Following the administrative reorganization made by the Ottoman government between 1870 and 1875, the name Rumelia ceased to correspond to any political division. Eastern Rumelia was constituted as an autonomous province of the Ottoman Empire by the Treaty of Berlin (1878), but on September 6, 1885, after a bloodless revolution, it was united with Bulgaria. The Kosovo Vilayet was created in 1877.

In Turkey, the word Trakya (Thrace) has now mostly replaced Rumeli (Rumelia) to refer to the part of Turkey that is in Europe (the provinces of Edirne, Kırklareli, Tekirdağ, the northern part of Çanakkale Province and the western part of Istanbul Province). However, "Rumelia" remains in use in historical contexts and is still used in the context of the culture of the current Turkish populations within the Southeastern Europe and the descendants of Turkish immigrants from the Southeastern Europe. The region in Turkey is also referred to as Eastern Thrace, or Turkish Thrace. In Greece, the term Ρούμελη (Rumeli) has been used since Ottoman times to refer to Central Greece, especially when it is juxtaposed with the Peloponnese or Morea. The word Rumeli is also used in some cases, mostly in Istanbul, to refer exclusively to the part of Istanbul Province that is west of the Bosphorus strait.

== See also ==
- Ada Kaleh
- Millet (Ottoman Empire)
- Ottoman Albania
- Ottoman Bosnia and Herzegovina
- Ottoman Bulgaria
- Ottoman Croatia
- Ottoman Greece
- Ottoman Hungary
- Ottoman Kosovo
- Ottoman Moldova
- Ottoman Romania
- Ottoman Serbia
- Ottoman Vardar Macedonia
- Ottoman wars in Europe
- Rum Millet
- Rumelia Eyalet
- Sultanate of Rum
- Turks in the Balkans
