= Red Mosque, Berat =

Former mosque in Berat, Albania

Red Mosque
- Xhamia e Kuqe
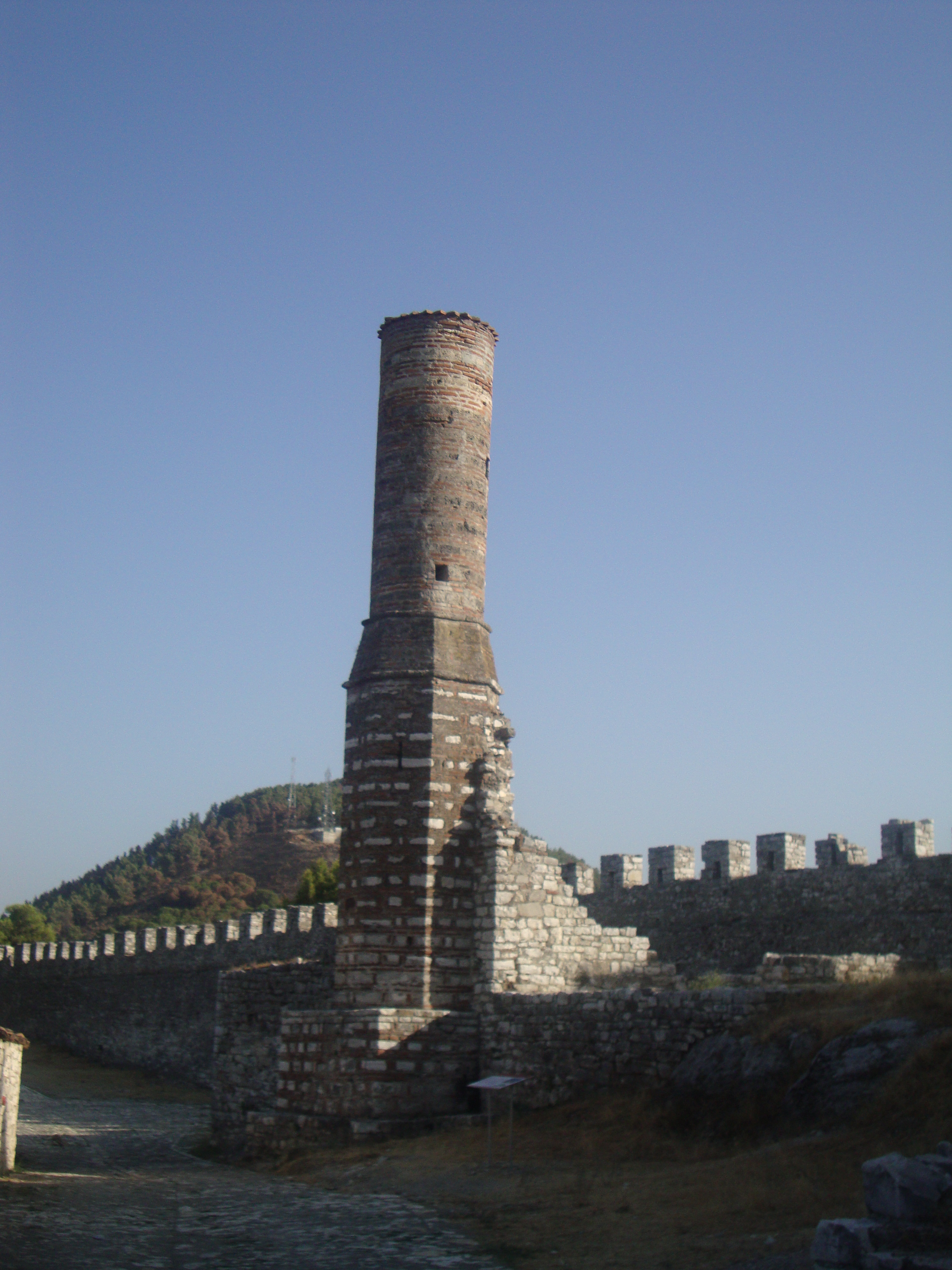
- The former mosque minaret in 2012

- Location of the former mosque in Albania

Religion
- Affiliation: Islam (former)
- Ecclesiastical or organizational status: Mosque (15th century–YYYY)
- Status: Inactive (ruinous state)

Location
- Location: Berat Castle, Berat
- Country: Albania
- Interactive map of Red Mosque
- Coordinates: 40°42′26″N 19°56′45″E

Architecture
- Type: Islamic architecture
- Style: Ottoman
- Founder: Bayazid II
- Completed: c. 15th century
- Materials: Red bricks; limestone

Cultural Monument of Albania
- Official name: Red Mosque
- Designated: 1961
- Part of: Historic Centres of Berat and Gjirokastër
- Reference no.: BR461

UNESCO World Heritage Site
- Official name: Historic Centres of Berat and Gjirokastër
- Criteria: Cultural: iii, iv
- Reference: 569
- Inscription: 2005 (29th Session)
- Extensions: 2008

The Red Mosque (Albanian: Xhamia e Kuqe, Turkish: Kırmızı Cami), also known as the Conquest Mosque, is a former mosque in a ruinous state, located in Berat Castle, Berat, Albania. The former mosque was designated as a Cultural Monument of Albania in 1961; and forms part of the Historic Centres of Berat and Gjirokastër, a UNESCO World Heritage Site that was designated in 2005.

== History ==
According to Ottoman explorer, Evliya Çelebi (1611–1682), the former mosque was built under the reign of Bayazid II. It was probably built in the 15th century and was one of the oldest mosques in the country. It was most likely built shortly after the conquest of Berat by the Ottomans in 1417. The oldest written record dates from 1431/32. The original names were Mosque of the ruler and Mosque of conquest.

The former mosque was used by caravans crossing the continent, and later by the Ottoman army.

== Description ==
The former mosque was located just outside the citadel, within the Berat Castle. The 9.9-by-9.1-metre (32 by 30 ft) mosque was built with red bricks, hence its name, and limestone, with a timber roof. The minaret is unusually on the left of entrance. The cylindrical part on its top is unique in Islamic culture. Inside, a small circular staircase gives access to the top for a 360° view of the castle and the city.

== Gallery ==
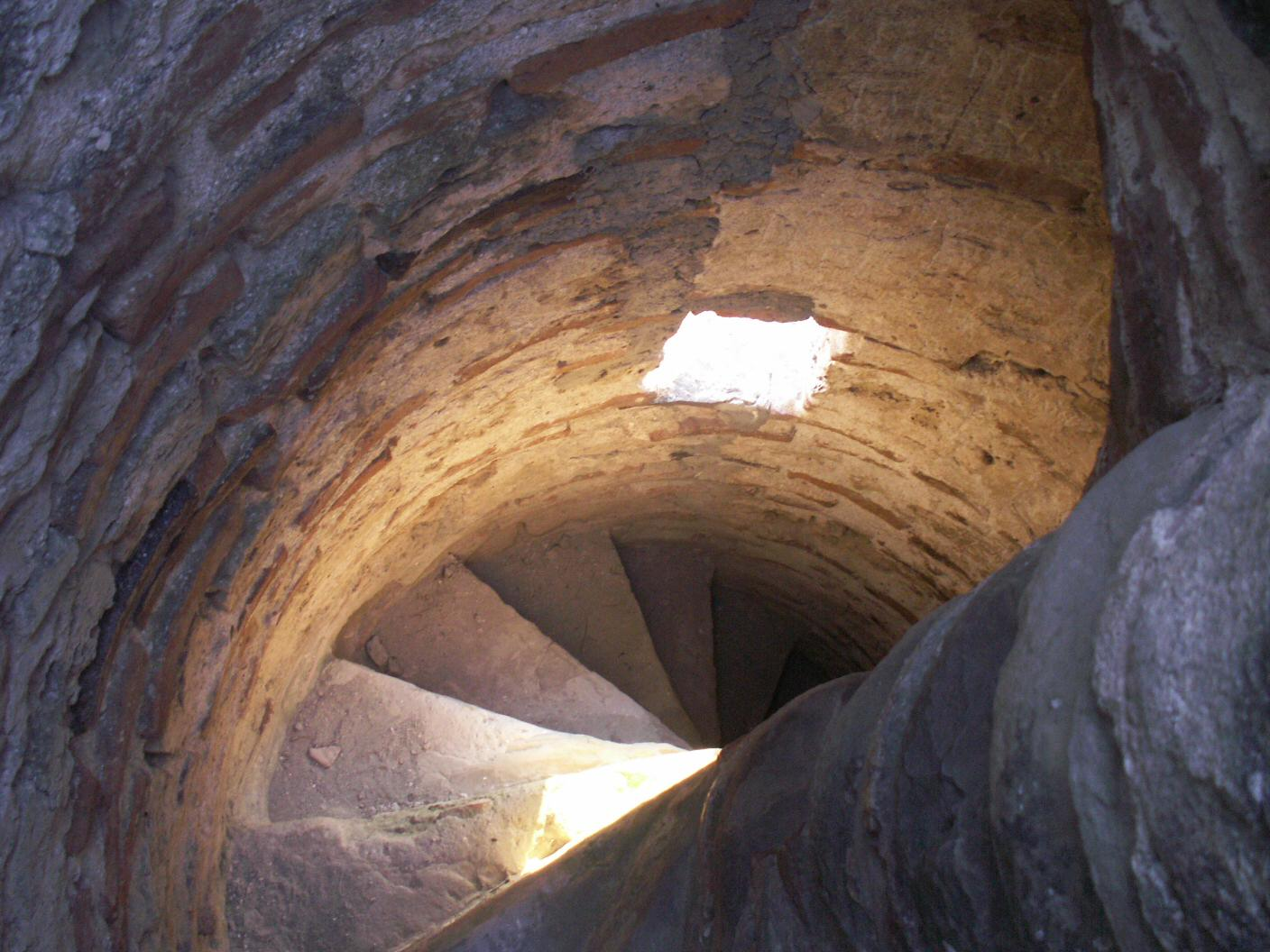
Staircase inside the minaret

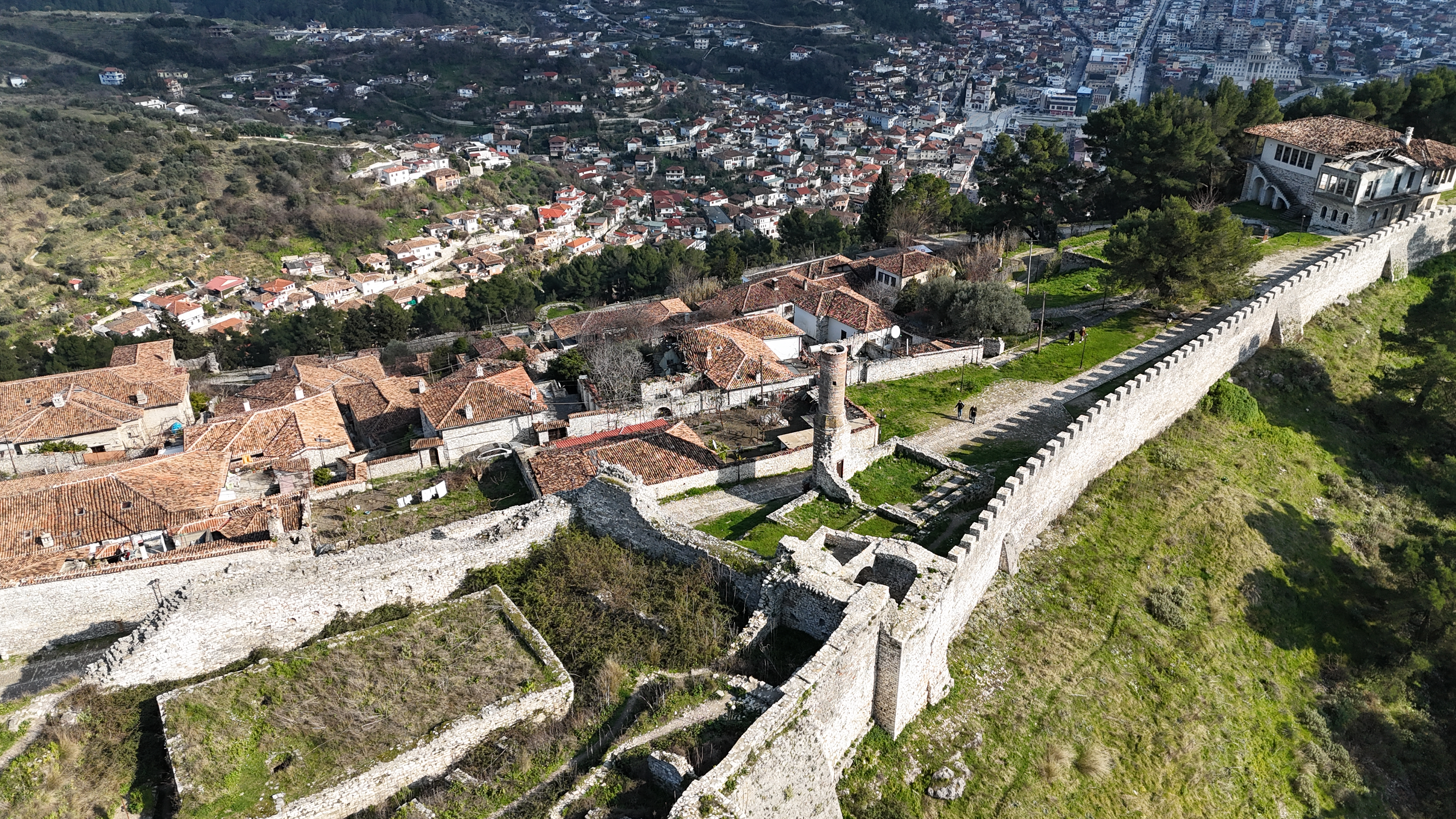
Aerial view of the citadel with the minaret in the foreground

== See also ==
- Islam in Albania
- List of mosques in Albania
- List of Religious Cultural Monuments of Albania
