= Islamization of Bosnia and Herzegovina =

Gradual conversion of Bosnian Slavs from Christianity to Islam during the Ottoman period

A significant number of people in the former Kingdom of Bosnia converted to Islam after the conquest by the Ottoman Empire in the second half of the 15th century, giving it a unique character within the Balkan region. It took over one hundred years for Islam to become the majority religion. Many scholars agree that the Islamization of the Bosnian population was gradual, involved various factors such as urbanization, spread of Sufi orders, church decentralization, and expansion of economic and social infrastructure following Ottoman conquest.

== History ==
Several factors appear to have been behind this process. Most important was that Christianity had relatively shallow roots in Bosnia prior to the Ottoman domination. Bosnia lacked a strong Christian church organization to command a strong following—the result of a scarcity of priests and competition among the Catholic and Eastern Orthodox churches and the schismatic Bosnian Church, which collapsed shortly before the Ottomans arrived. This left most people religiously unengaged and receptive to the appeal of Islam's institutions. This receptiveness was aided by the development among many people of a kind of folk Christianity centered on various practices and ceremonies that was adaptable to a form of folk Islam popular at the time of the invasion.

One older theory as to why conversion to Islam was more prevalent in Bosnia than other places in the Balkans is the possibility that the Bosnian Church practiced Bogomilism. Bogomilism was regarded as a major dualistic heresy by the Catholic Church and against whom Pope John XXII even launched a Crusade in 1325. Thus many adherents of the Bosnian Church were more receptive to conversion to Islam. In fact, in the Bogomilian tradition, there were several practices that resembled Islam: they repudiated the Cross as a religious symbol, they considered it as idolatry to bow down before religious images, relics or saints, and even prayed five times a day (reciting the Lord's Prayer.) However, it is not universally accepted among historians that the Bosnian Church was Bogomilist.

This theory is supported by some historians, including Sir Thomas Arnold, but other historians consider it an oversimplification. It is pointed out that Bosnians of all Christian denominations converted to Islam, including from the Catholic and Orthodox churches, not just those from the Bosnian church. Additionally, much of the population of Bosnia did not belong to the Bosnian church. Finally, under Ottoman rule there was significant religious conversion in many directions: many Catholics converted to the Orthodox church and vice versa.

According to scholar Fine, the reason why conversion to Islam was more prevalent in Bosnia (and Albania) as opposed to other areas under Ottoman rule is because these areas had multiple competing churches, none of which were dominant. Thus Bosnians were less devoted Christians than other Balkanites.

Another way in which Bosnia differed from other parts of the Ottoman Balkans is that, for most of the Ottoman period, Bosnia was a frontier province, facing some of the empire's most important enemies— Austria, Hungary, and Venice. To fill up depopulated areas of northern and western Bosnia, the Ottomans encouraged the migration of large numbers of hardy settlers with military skills from Serbia and Herzegovina. Some of these settlers were Vlachs, members of a pre-Slav Balkan population that had acquired a Latinate language and specialized in stock breeding, horse raising, long-distance trade, and fighting. Most were members of the Serbian Orthodox Church. Before the Ottoman conquest, that church had had very few members in the Bosnian lands outside Herzegovina and the eastern strip of the Drina valley. There is no definite evidence of any Orthodox church buildings in central, northern, or western Bosnia before 1463. During the 16th century, however, several Orthodox monasteries were built in those parts of Bosnia, apparently to serve the newly settled Orthodox population there.

Economic and social gain was also an incentive to become a Muslim: conversion to Islam conferred economic and social status. Under the feudal system imposed by the Ottomans, only those who converted to Islam could acquire and inherit land and property, which accorded them political rights, a status usually denied to non-Muslims. A number of Christian nobles, however, were able to retain their estates early on in the Ottoman rule by fighting on behalf of the Empire, suggesting that holding on to their property was not a major incentive for early conversions to Islam. At a lower socioeconomic level, most new converts to Islam were able to turn their holdings into freehold farms. At the bottom of the socioeconomic ladder were the serfs, who constituted the majority of the population and were predominantly Christians. In addition, only Muslims could hold positions in the Ottoman state apparatus, which conferred special privileges and a much higher standard of living.

The gradual conversion to Islam proceeded at different rates in various areas and among different groups. Conversion to Islam was more rapid in urban areas, which were centers of learning and of the Ottoman administration, than in the countryside. Merchants found it advantageous to convert to Islam because they gained greater freedom of movement and state protection for their goods as Muslims. Many professional soldiers also converted to Islam to ensure more rapid promotion.

By the 17th century a majority of the population of Bosnia was Muslim.

The various advantages and privileges that were reserved for Muslims and the large number of conversions they encouraged among the native population led to the emergence over time of a largely local Muslim ruling class that dominated political and economic power in Bosnia and Herzegovina. In the later Ottoman period, Bosnia attracted Muslim refugees from lands that were reconquered by Christian powers (mainly Croatia, Hungary, western Romania and Slovenia). Some converted to Islam as a way to escape the devşirme tribute (whereby the son of Christian family would be taken for military service). At the same time, some Muslim families preferred to have their sons conscripted (e.g. into the Janissary) as that gave them a chance to go to school and advance professionally.

Another way in which Bosnia was Islamized was through immigration. During the Great Turkish War of the late 1600s, the Ottoman Empire lost control of most of Hungary and portions of the northwestern Balkans. Many Muslims in these regions fled to other parts of the Balkans, including to Bosnia.

== See also ==
- Islam in Bosnia and Herzegovina
- Islamization of Albania
- Islamization
- Spread of Islam
- Muslim conquests
