= Bazaar Mosque =

Mosque in Krujë, Durrës County, Albania

- Xhamia e Pazarit
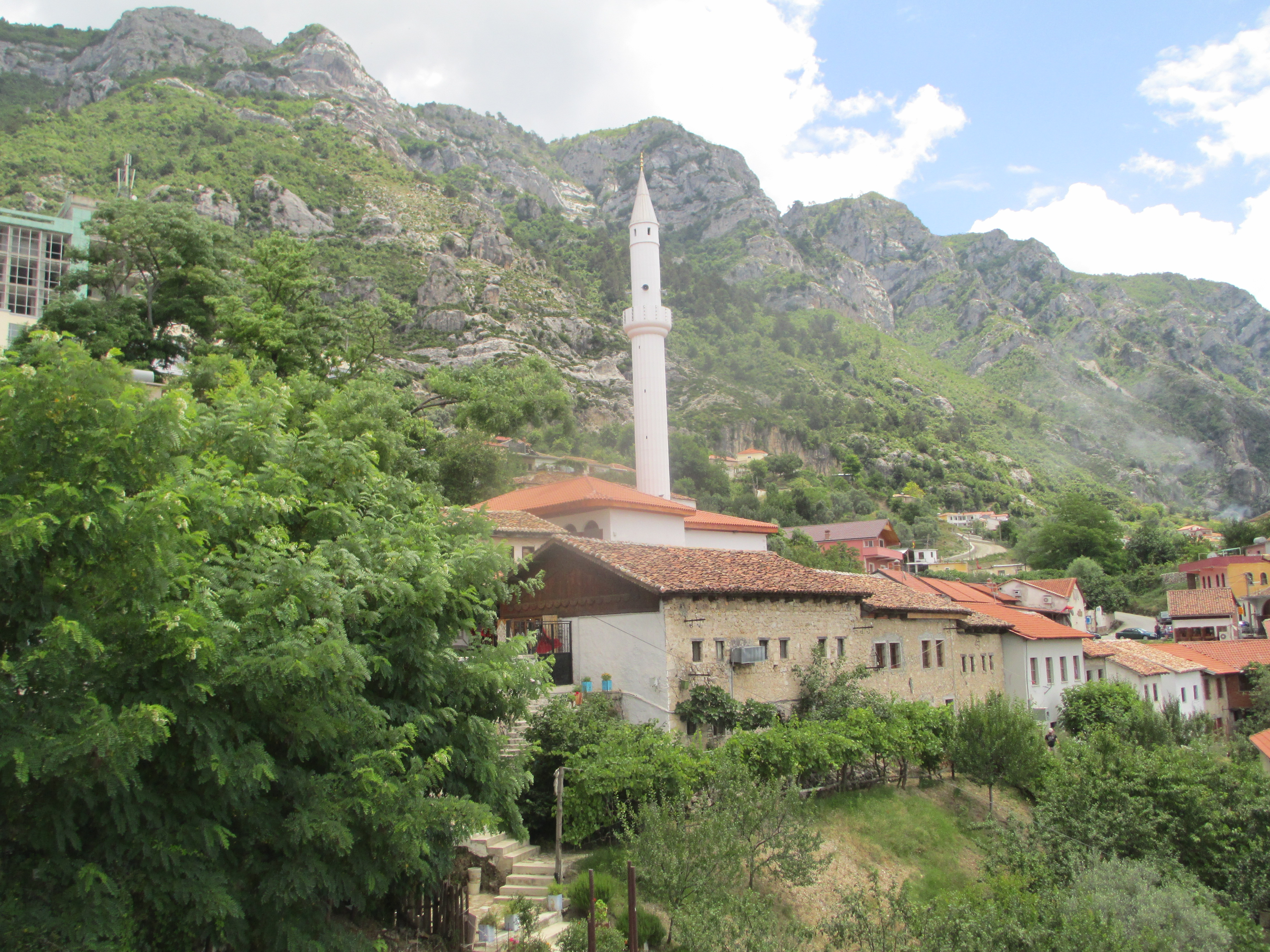
- The mosque, with new minaret, in 2014

- Location of the mosque in Albania

Religion
- Affiliation: Islam
- Ecclesiastical or organizational status: Mosque: (1533–c. 1946); (since 1991– )
- Status: Active

Location
- Location: Krujë, Durrës County
- Country: Albania
- Interactive map of Bazaar Mosque
- Coordinates: 41°30′35″N 19°47′40″E

Architecture
- Type: Islamic architecture
- Style: Ottoman
- Completed: 1533 CE; 1991 (restored)
- Minaret: 1

Cultural Monument of Albania
- Official name: The Mosque of Bazaar, Kruje
- Reference no.: 12

The Bazaar Mosque (Albanian: Xhamia e Pazarit), also known as Murad Bey mosque (Xhamia Muratbeu) or Varosh Mosque (Xhamia e Varoshit), is a mosque, located in Krujë, in Durrës County, Albania. Completed in 1533 CE, the mosque is a Cultural Monument of Albania.

== Overview ==
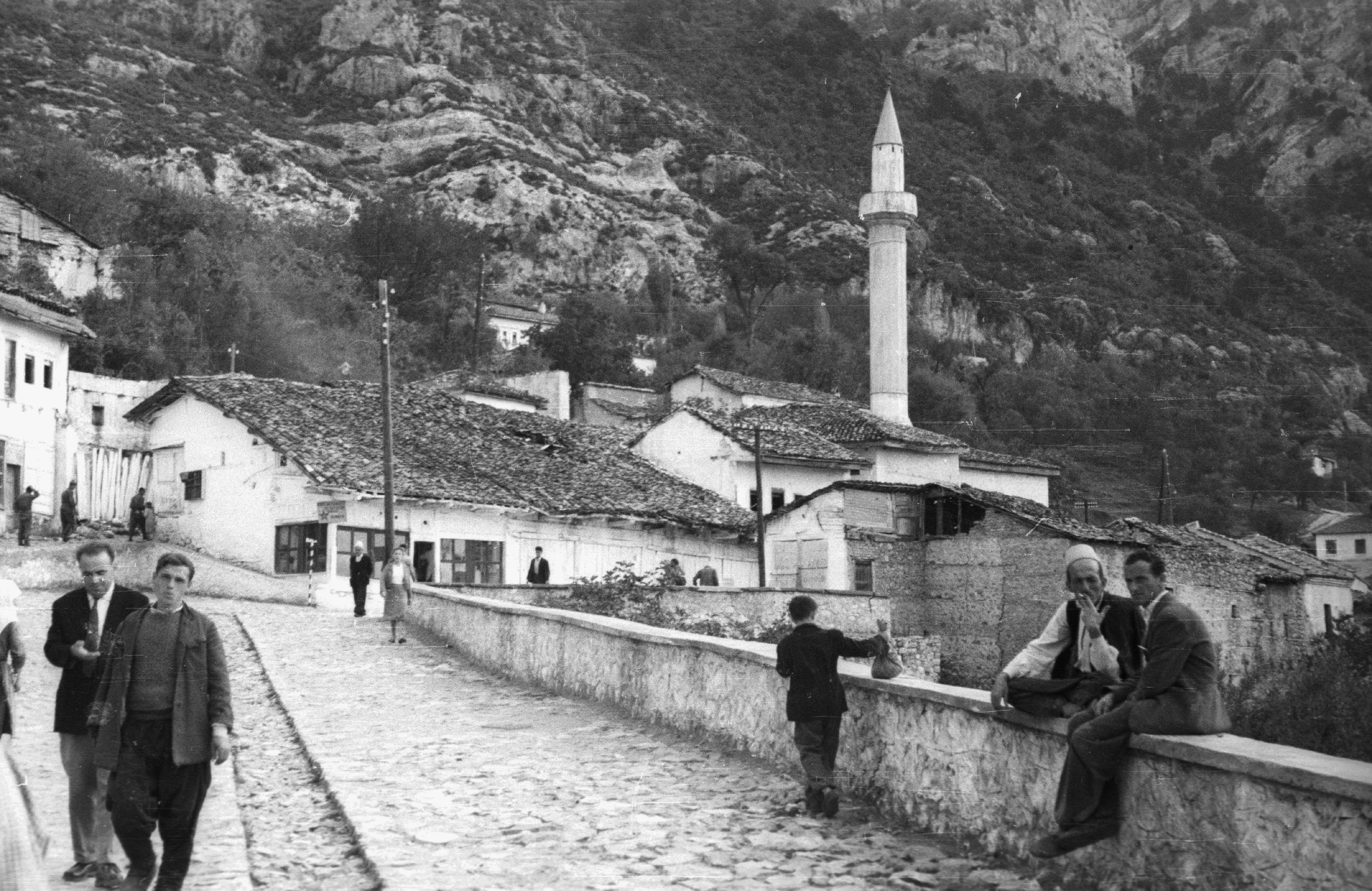
Old image of the mosque (around 1963) with its original stone minaret

The mosque is situated in the historic bazaar of Kruje (the Derexhiku Bazaar), known as Akce Hisar in Ottoman times. Built by Ottoman Albanian beys, the mosque was closed during the Communist dictatorship and its traditional-style stone minaret was torn down. The mosque was reopened in 1991 and a new minaret was subsequently erected.

During the renovation by the Turkish Cooperation and Coordination Agency (TIKA) in the 2010s, the antique ornate and interior painting of the Bazaar mosque got lost due to whitening.

== See also ==
- Islam in Albania
- List of mosques in Albania
