= Mitocul Maicilor =

Romanian Orthodox church

Coordinates: 47.1677°N 27.5800°E

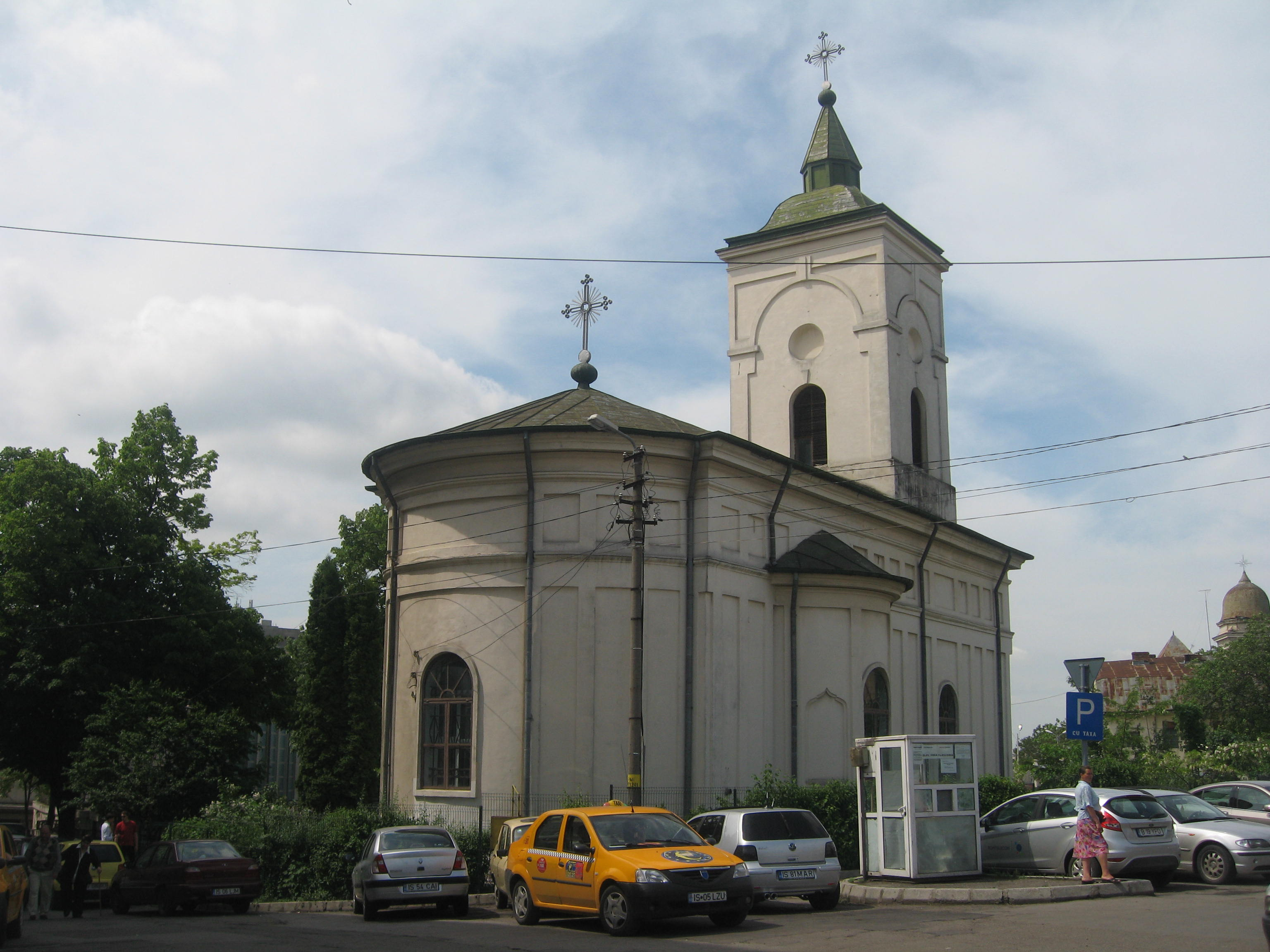
Mitocul Maicilor

Mitocul Maicilor ("the nuns' metochion") is a Romanian Orthodox church located at 1 Trianon Passageway in Iași, Romania. It is dedicated to Parascheva of the Balkans and to Anthony the Great.

== History ==
First built around 1680, the church was rebuilt in 1760 by Vasile Roset. In this early phase, it was associated with the traders and craftsmen who lived in the area and desired their own place of worship. In 1792, after the Treaty of Jassy was signed, Metropolitan Iacob II Stamate blessed the church and dedicated it to Parascheva, whose relics were kept at the city's Trei Ierarhi Monastery. During his reign, it came under the jurisdiction of the Moldavia Metropolis. The year 1792 is marked on a small metal inscription placed on the eastern face of the building.

Shortly thereafter, it became a monastery. Two houses with cells were built for nuns brought from Socola Monastery. Soon, Prince Alexander Mourousis moved the nuns to Agapia Monastery, and the cells were left in the hands of that establishment, as well as Văratec Monastery. It was during its affiliation with the nuns that the present name was bestowed. Aside from living quarters, the nuns used the cells to teach pupils and to host students and visitors. In 1819, the church was again rebuilt by postelnic Mihail Pascu. Following earthquakes, as well as bombings during World War II, the building was seriously deteriorated, so that exterior repairs were carried out in 1959. A new support pole for the spire cross was installed and interior varnishing was done in 1966.

== Description ==
The church is trefoil in form, plastered on the exterior and interior. It is made of stone and brick, with a frame roof and six windows. Outside ornamentation is limited to a few simple decorative motifs of Neoclassical or Baroque inspiration. The bell tower sits atop the vestibule, while the church is entered through an added foyer. Another entrance door lies on the south face of the altar. Until the 1863 secularization of monastic estates in Romania, the church was administered by Văratec Monastery. It then passed to Iași city hall, which paid the clergy's salaries, until 1892, when clerical reform again brought it under the Metropolis of Moldavia, which declared it freestanding. In 1925, when the Romanian Orthodox Church was reorganized, it became a filial of the Banu Church.

The interior walls are not painted. The iconostasis is of carved wood, with the icon of the Last Supper is in the Italian style. The rest of the iconostasis icons are post-Byzantine, painted in the early 19th century. Among the valuables in the collection are the silver chalice from 1795, the 1784 Gospel Book from Râmnic and the 1821 one from Neamț Monastery, and the 1824 silver communion box. There is also a sewn epitaphios from 1880 and a wooden pulpit carved in the early 19th century.

While Parascheva is the principal patron, it is not known when the dedication to the secondary patron, Anthony, took place, as no relevant documents survive. The church is close to the palace of Alexandru Ion Cuza, today the Union Museum, and served as his personal chapel. Thus, it has been known as Cuza's Church. His throne forms part of its property.

The church is listed as a historic monument by Romania's Ministry of Culture and Religious Affairs.

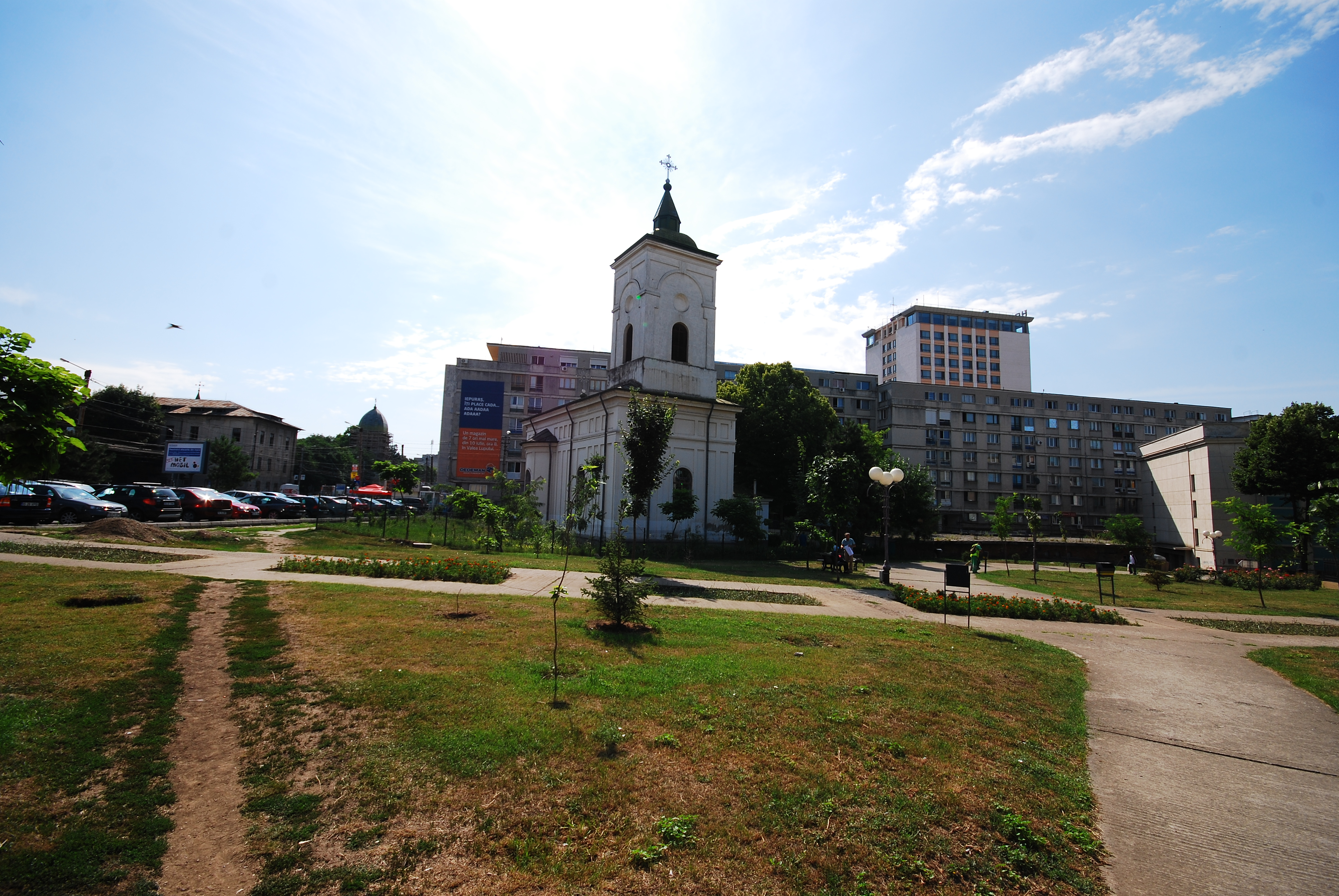
Setting

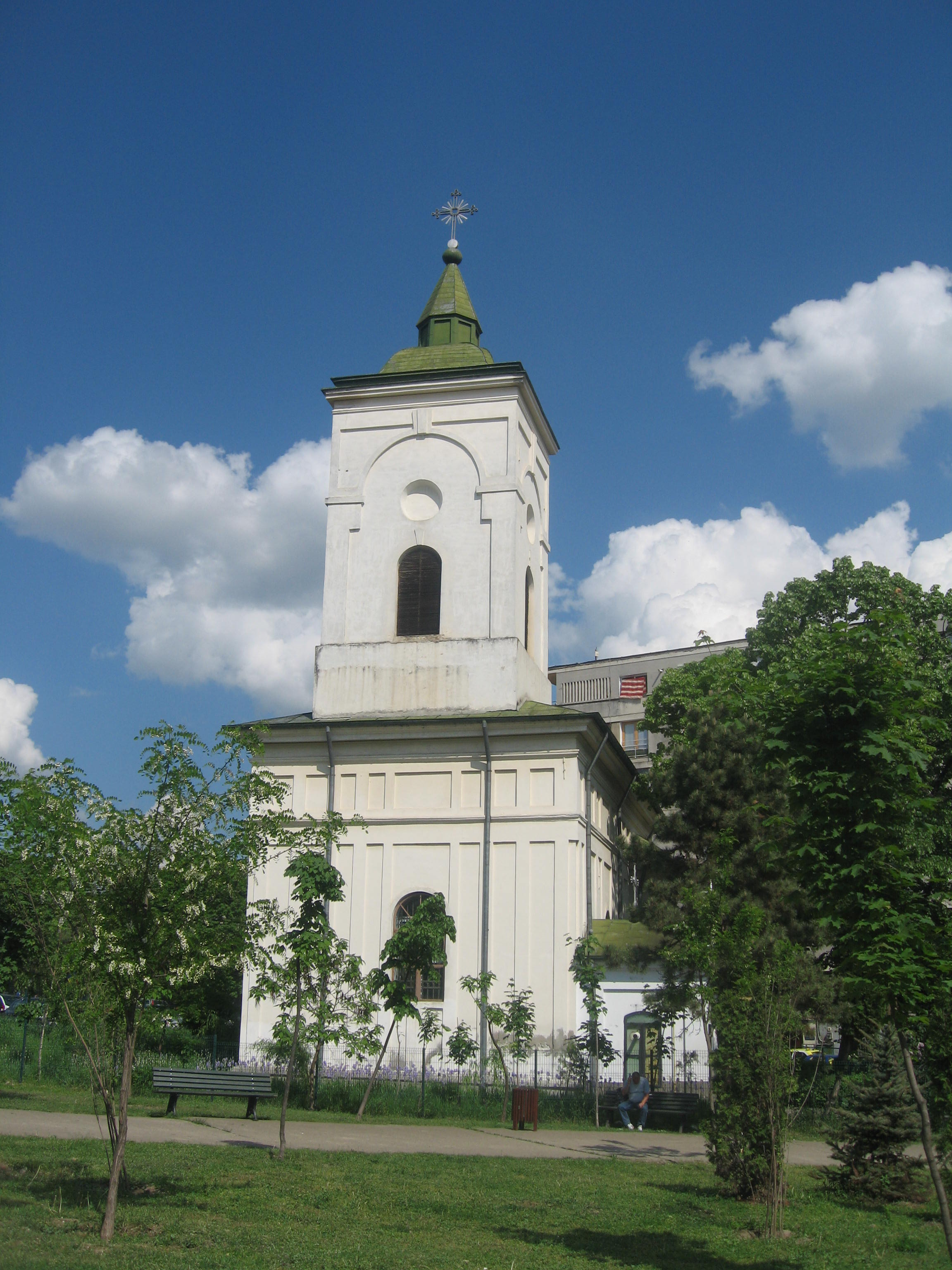
Bell tower

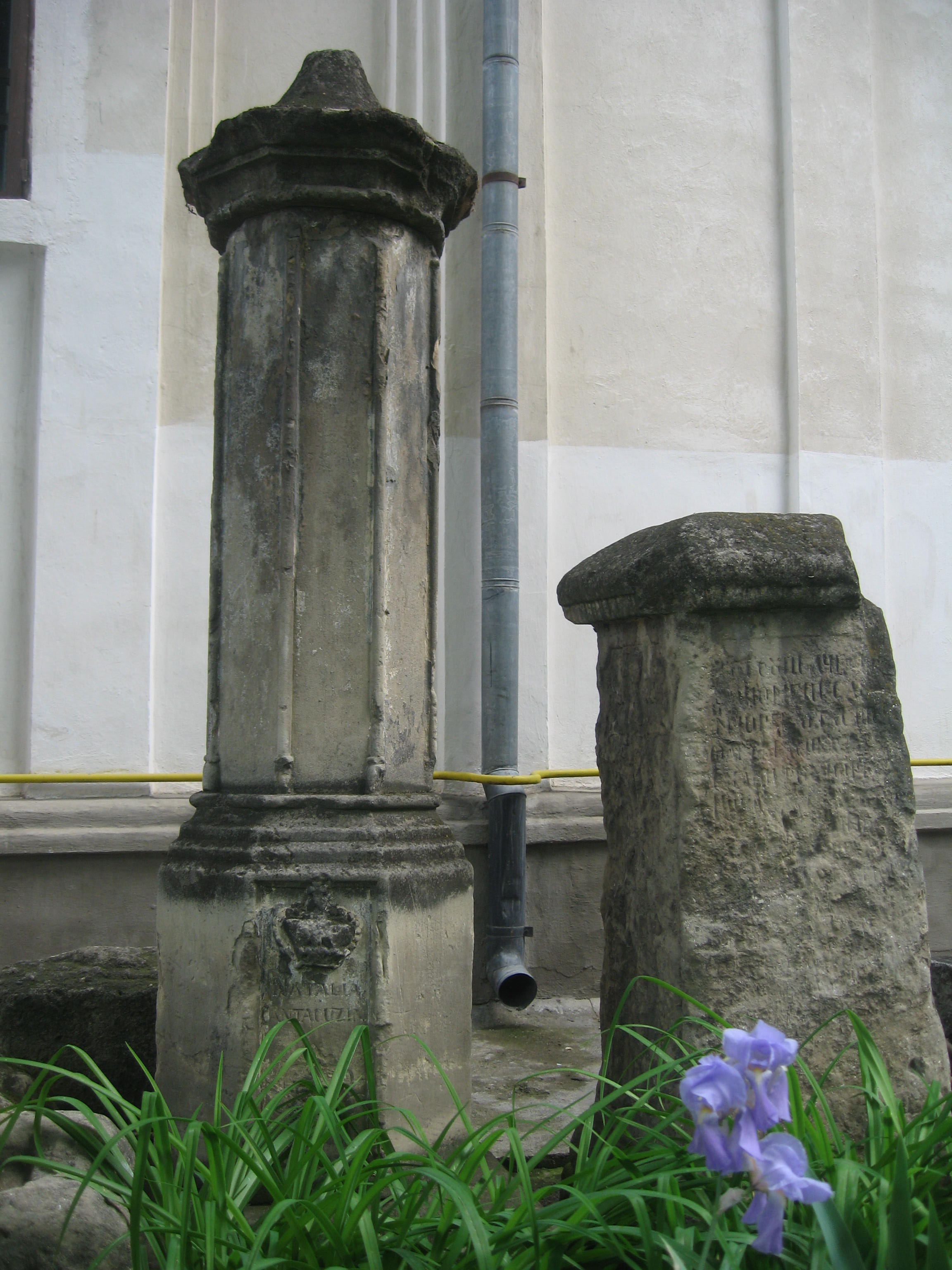
Natalia Cantacuzino grave (left)

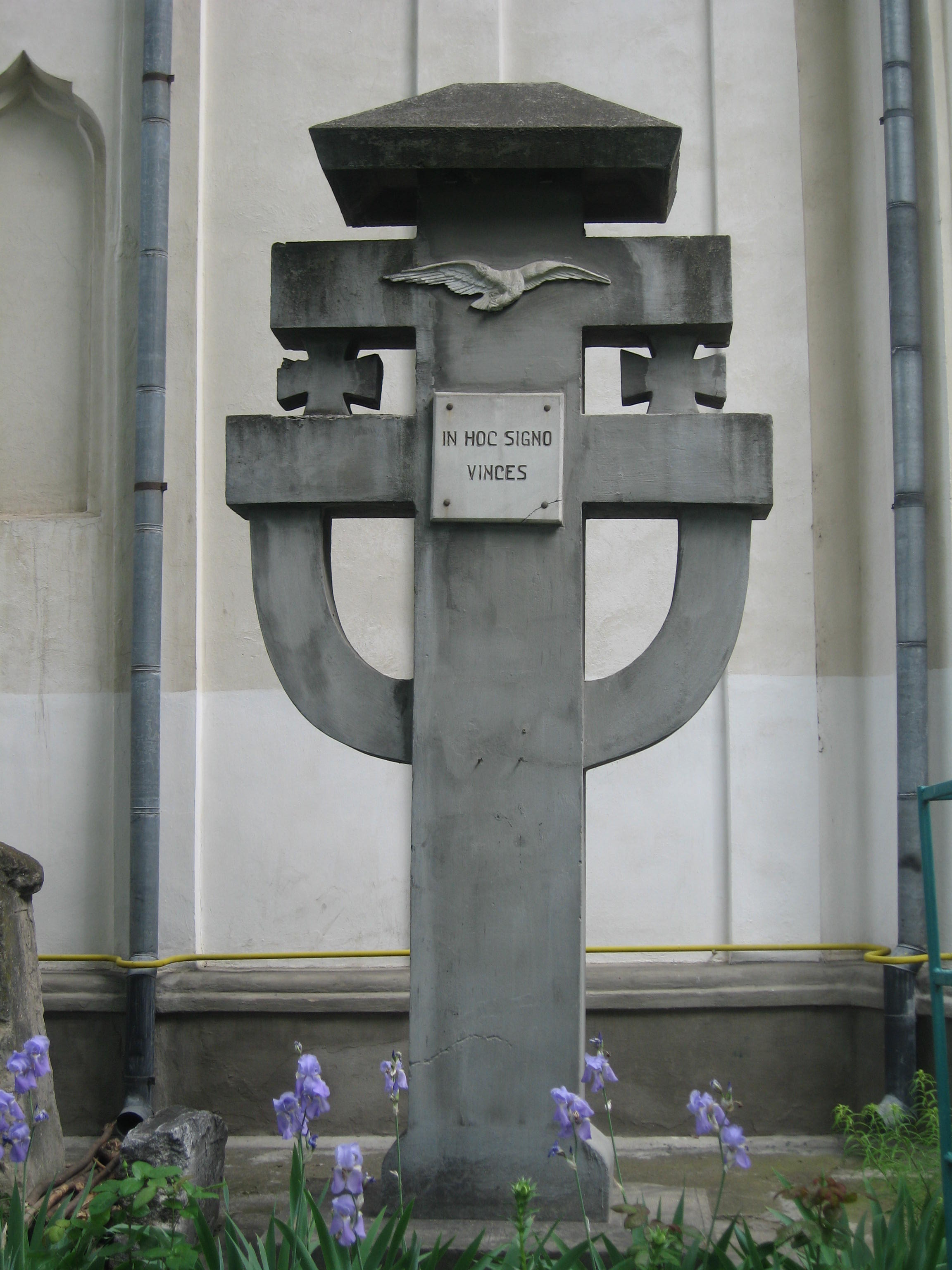
Cross
