= Kostoperska Karpa =

Coordinates: 42°10′15″N 21°48′35″E

- Костоперска Карпа (Macedonian); Костоперски Рид (Macedonian); Жеглиговски Камен (Macedonian)
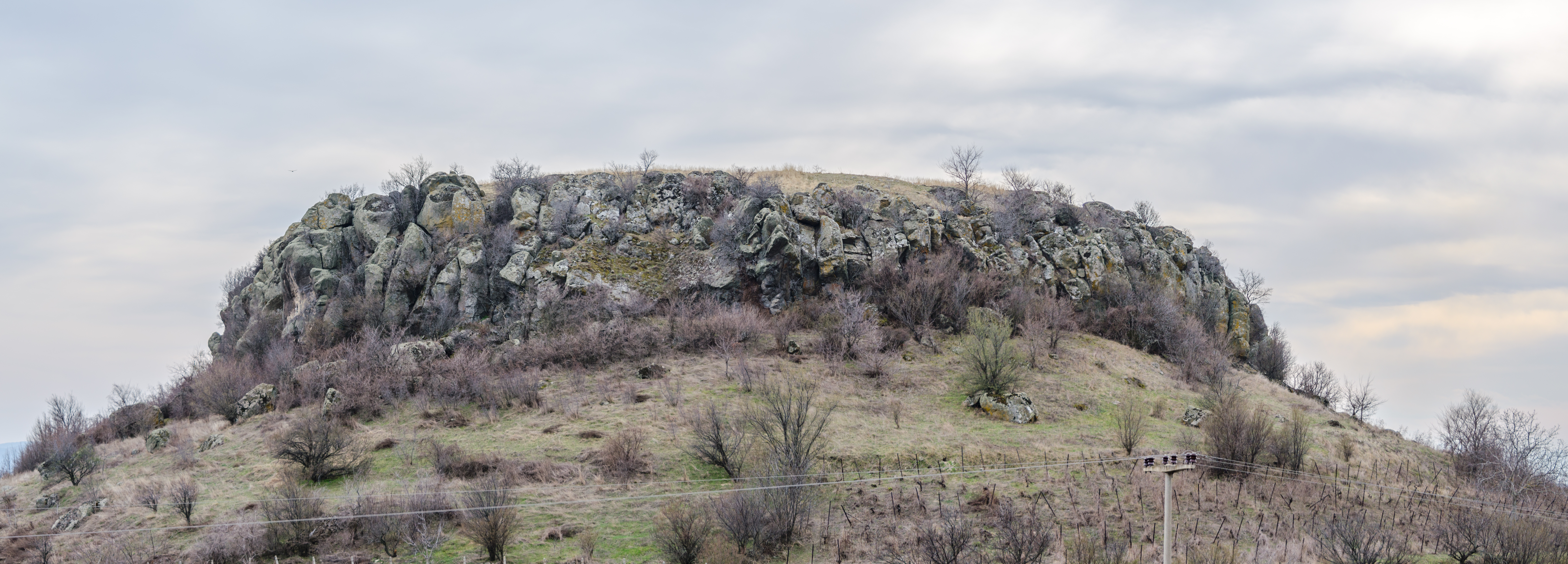
- Kostoperska Karpa seen from the side
- Interactive map of Kostoperska Karpa
- Location: Mlado Nagoričane, Staro Nagoričane Municipality, North Macedonia

History
- Formed: Cenozoic period
- Built: Various times since the Bronze Age

Site notes
- Height: 50-80m
- Architectural styles: Hellenic, Macedonian, Roman

Kostoperska Karpa (Macedonian: Костоперска Карпа), also known as Kostoperski Rid (Macedonian: Костоперски Рид) and (Macedonian: Жеглиговски Камен, lit. 'Žegligovski Kamen'), is an ancient archeological site near Kumanovo and Mlado Nagoričane, North Macedonia. The ancient site includes ruins from the Macedonian Kingdom, Roman Empire, and Byzantine Empire. The site is named after the numerous bones found in grave sites on and near the site.

Kostoperska Karpa has been noted to be of archeological note due to its unique position between the Balkans and the Aegean Sea. The site sits near an ancient road between Skopje and Sofia. It has been said that there were as many 40 different churches on and around Kostoperska Karpa, of which only a few have survived.

== Name ==
Kostoperska Karpa (Macedonian: Костоперска Карпа) is Macedonian for "Bone Washing Stone". It is also known as Kostoperski Rid (Macedonian: Костоперски Рид), which translates to "Bone Washing Hill". These names come from the numerous bones found in grave sites on and near the site. It's also known as Žegligovski Kamen (Macedonian: Жеглиговски Камен), which means "Stone from Zheigovo", Kostoper, Zelgig's Rock, and Vulcan Rock, the last referring to Kostoperska Karpa being a volcanic site.

== History ==
There is a circle around 500 metres (1,600 ft) around Kostoperska Karpa where Bronze Age remains and settlements have been found. Some of the settlements have been demolished to build roads. There is also evidence of habitation between the 5th and 3rd centuries BC.

The western slope of Kostoperska Karpa was used as a burial site in the 3rd and 4th centuries AD by the Romans. Personal items have been found in numerous graves. There is also a Roman-era acropolis near these graves. Near the mound off its western edge, there has also been found terracing, fragments of marble decorations bearing a cross, and a cross-inscribed stele.

Towards the central interior of the site, the remains of a 6th century basilica have been found, along with seven medieval graves.

Underground chambers have been found underneath the south side of the mouth, which are believed to date to the Byzantine Empire. Beds and shelves have been carved into the stone, along with stairways. Pottery, glass, and animal bones have all been found in these chambers. Similar facilities have been found in Cappadocia, Asia Minor, and in the Crimean Peninsula. The site underneath Kostoperska Karpa is the only such one found in the Balkans. The chambers include vertical shafts used for ventilation and collecting rainwater. Also on the south side of the mound is an unclear feature which is proposed to be a cistern, a hypogeum, a tomb, or a church, depending on its age.

The period of settlement in and on the mount is believed to have ended during the Ottoman Empire. Yellow and green pottery fragments have been found from this era.

A number of churches are found at the base of Kostoperska Karpa. A church dedicated to Saint George was built sometime in the 15th or 16th centuries. The building shows Turkic and Armenian influence. It was renovated at the end of the 16th century and beginning of the 17th century. Around this time, frescoes were installed, which still exist in the church. A few dome and an iconostasis was installed in the 19th century. Another church, dedicated to St. Petka, known as St. Paraskeva of the Balkans, was constructed between 1626 and 1628. The church still contains fragments of frescoes dating to 1628. St. Paraskeva of the Balkans underwent reconstruction and preservation in 2003. About half of the church has been destroyed. The most recent church, dedicated to Mary, mother of Jesus, was built in 1968. According to local legend, the church was built by two brothers. Not on the mound itself, but nearby, is a church which is also dedicated to Saint George, built in 1071. In the 14th century, frescoes were painted by Michael Astrapas and Eutychios.

The churches on and around Kostoperska Krepa continue to hold spiritual significance to the inhabitants of the region.

Near the mound, there is an ossuary which serves as a memorial for soldiers who died during the Battle of Kumanovo.

In 1983, 1988, 2000, 2015, and 2016, archeological studies were carried out.

== Geology ==
Kostoperska Karpa is part of a basaltic plateau. In the last 66 million years, during the Cenozoic period, the area now known as North Macedonia has been subject to intense volcanic activity. Kostoperska Karpa includes a significant amount of pyroclastic and volcanic rock as a result. Due to neotectonics and Erosion, the plateau which Kostoperska Karpa is part of has been divided into eight parts. Kostoperska Karpa is the most prominent of these plateaus. Other divisions include Tsarbernik, the largest of the plateaus, Sreden Kamen, and Ostrovista, which is the smallest. There is also Vujovska Karpa.

Human activity has made studies of the geological features of Kostoperska Karpa difficult, in particular ploughing.

It has been reported that is still some volcanic activity at the site.
