= Saint Parascheva Church, Iași =

Heritage site in Iași County, Romania

Coordinates: 47°10′14″N 27°34′29″E

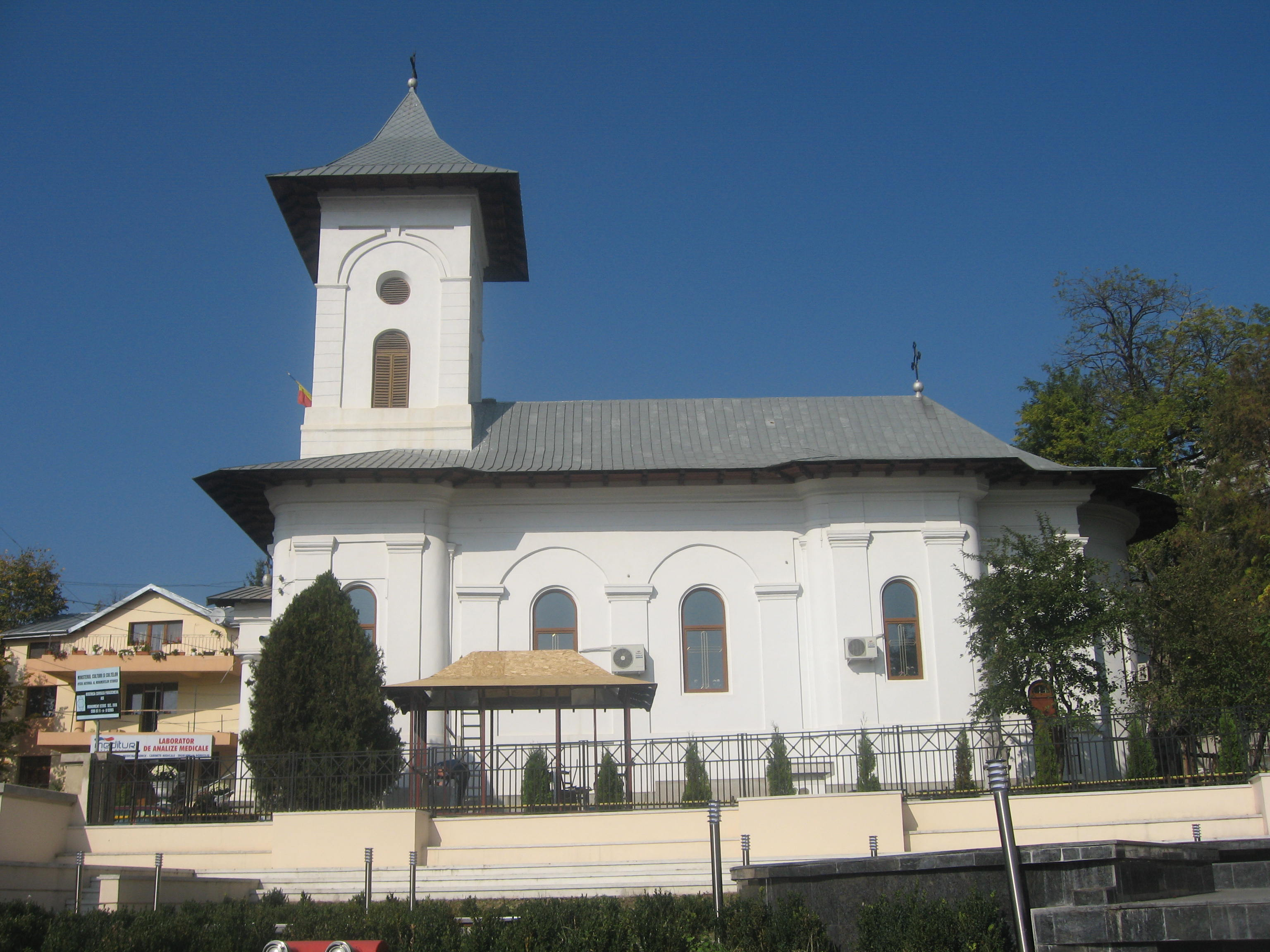
Saint Parascheva Church

Saint Parascheva Church (Romanian: Biserica Sfânta Parascheva) is a Romanian Orthodox church located at 6 Păcurari Street in Iași, Romania. It is dedicated to Parascheva of the Balkans.

Located right by the Central University Library, it stands on the site of an earlier wooden church from 1730, dedicated to the Archangels Michael and Gabriel. The site of the old altar table is marked by a cross to the right of the current altar, on the exterior. Archaeological evidence, including ruins, bones and coins, points to the presence of a still earlier church, from the reign of Vasile Lupu (1634-1653).

The present church was built between 1852 and 1858 through the efforts of the priest Constantin Pavelescu and the administrator Dumitru Burduja. Although historian N. A. Bogdan suggested Costache Conachi was the founder, this hypothesis was later rejected, as he died in 1849. Today, Pavelescu's is one of two graves in the churchyard. Part of the beggars' guild attended the parish, the remainder going to the Banu Church. The church used to be a filial of Saint Nicholas the Poor, which no longer exists.

The church is made of brick on a stone foundation and covered in a tin roof. The nave is rectangular, the altar arched. The bell tower sits atop the foyer; it is prism-shaped, with a square base, and has four curtained windows. An arch separates the vestibule from the nave, and both have half-sphere ceilings. Another arch, above the iconostasis, separates the nave from the altar. The church is sometimes called Prepodobna (Slavonic for "most holy"), Sfânta Vineri or Vinerea Mare (another name for Parascheva).

Renovations were carried out in 1932. After a bomb fell on the stairs in June 1944, during World War II, further repairs were done in 1945-1946. The church was painted between 1957 and 1962, with many interruptions. The frescoes depict Biblical scenes and saints' faces. The domes were reinforced after the 1977 Vrancea earthquake affected the building, and work was done on the spire in 1993.

The icons in the iconostasis are original, from 1858, and are in the Renaissance style of Eustație Altini. The icon of Parascheva is decorated with silver, while the one of Saint Nicholas has a gilt metal frame. Valuable items in the church's collection include two Gospel Books printed at Neamț Monastery in 1821 and coated in silver; a silvered wooden cross with a pedestal kept on the altar table; two decorated silver communion boxes and an ornamented silver chalice. The church is listed as a historic monument by Romania's Ministry of Culture and Religious Affairs.

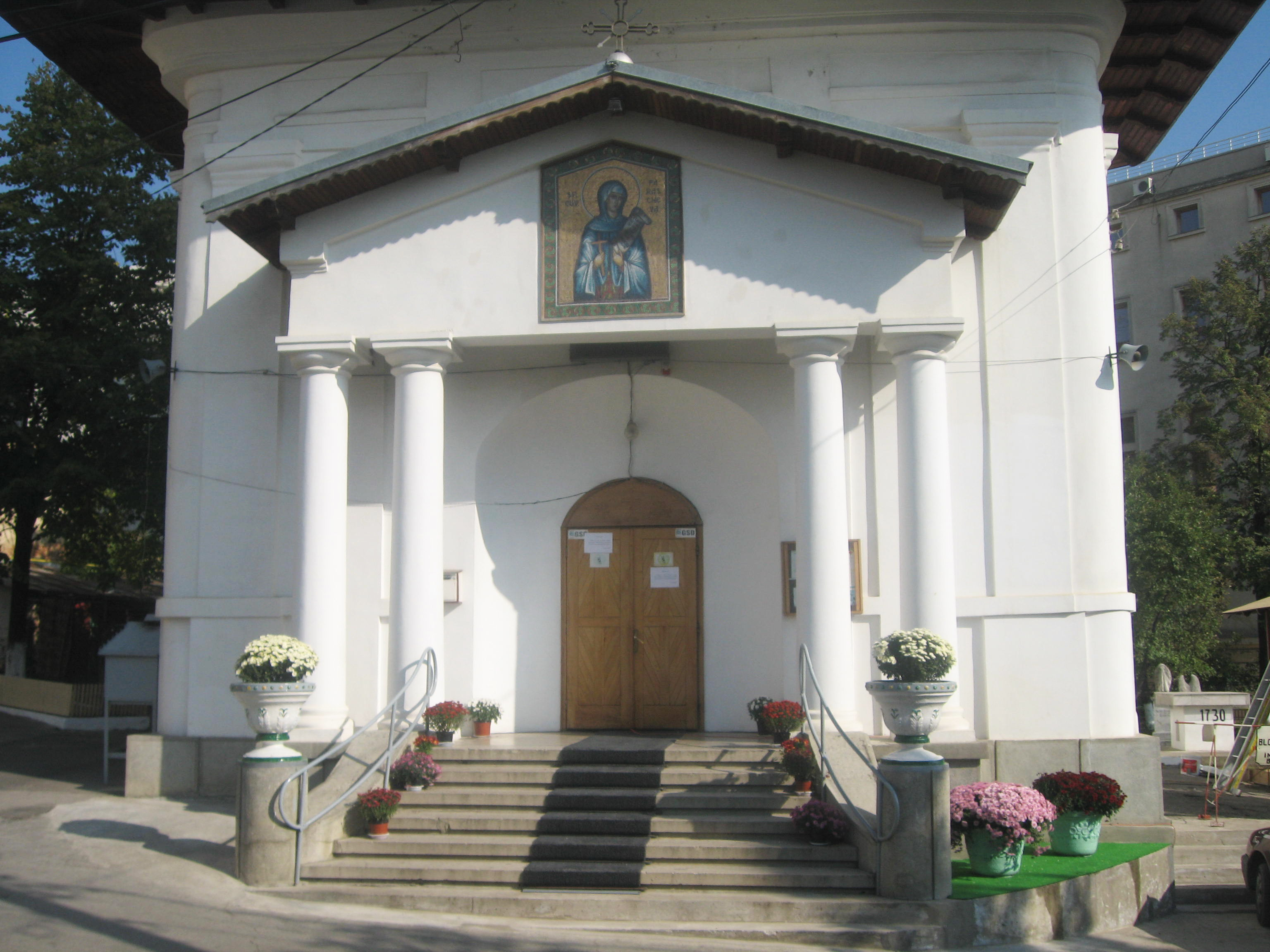
Entrance

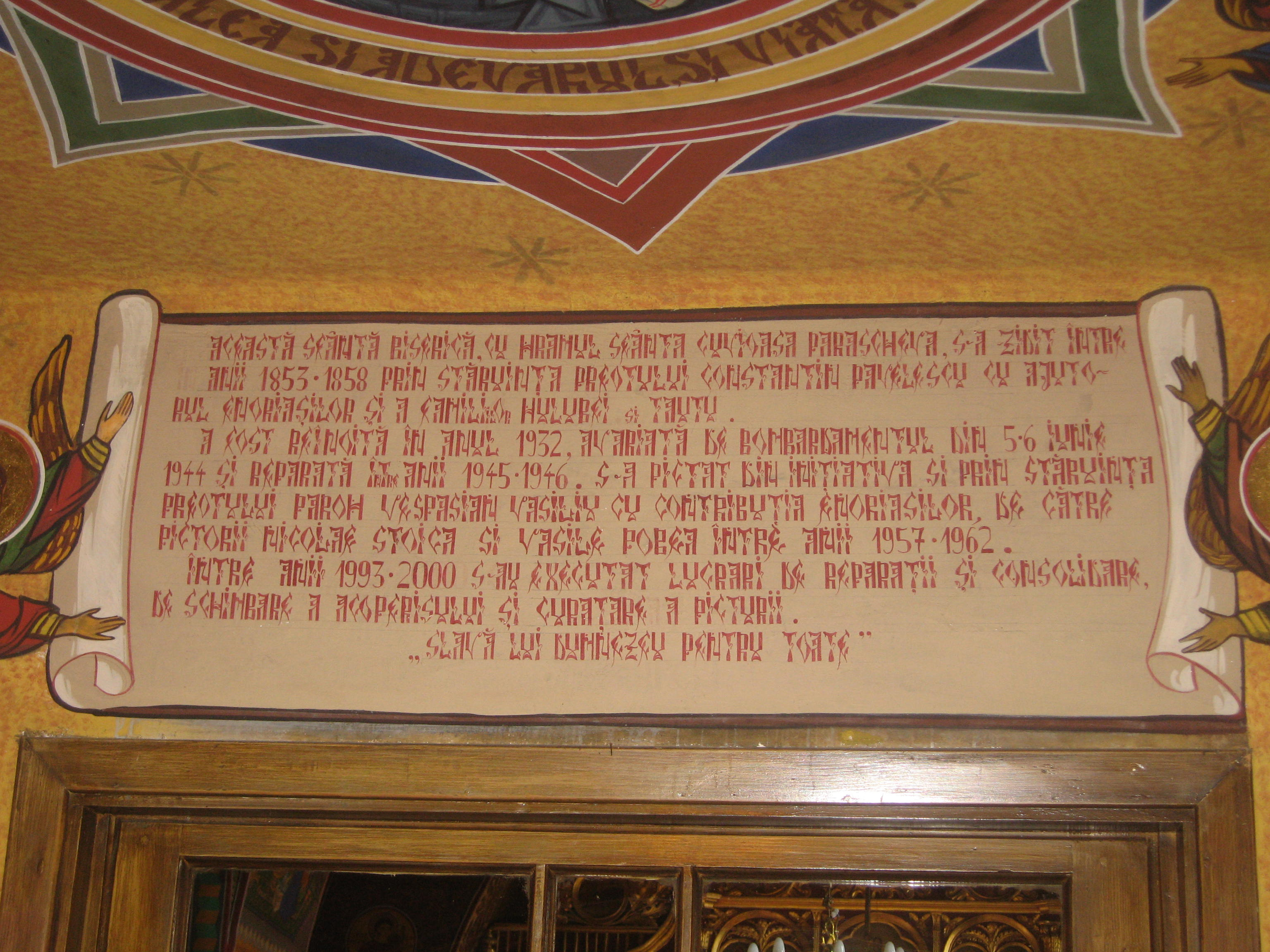
Dedication

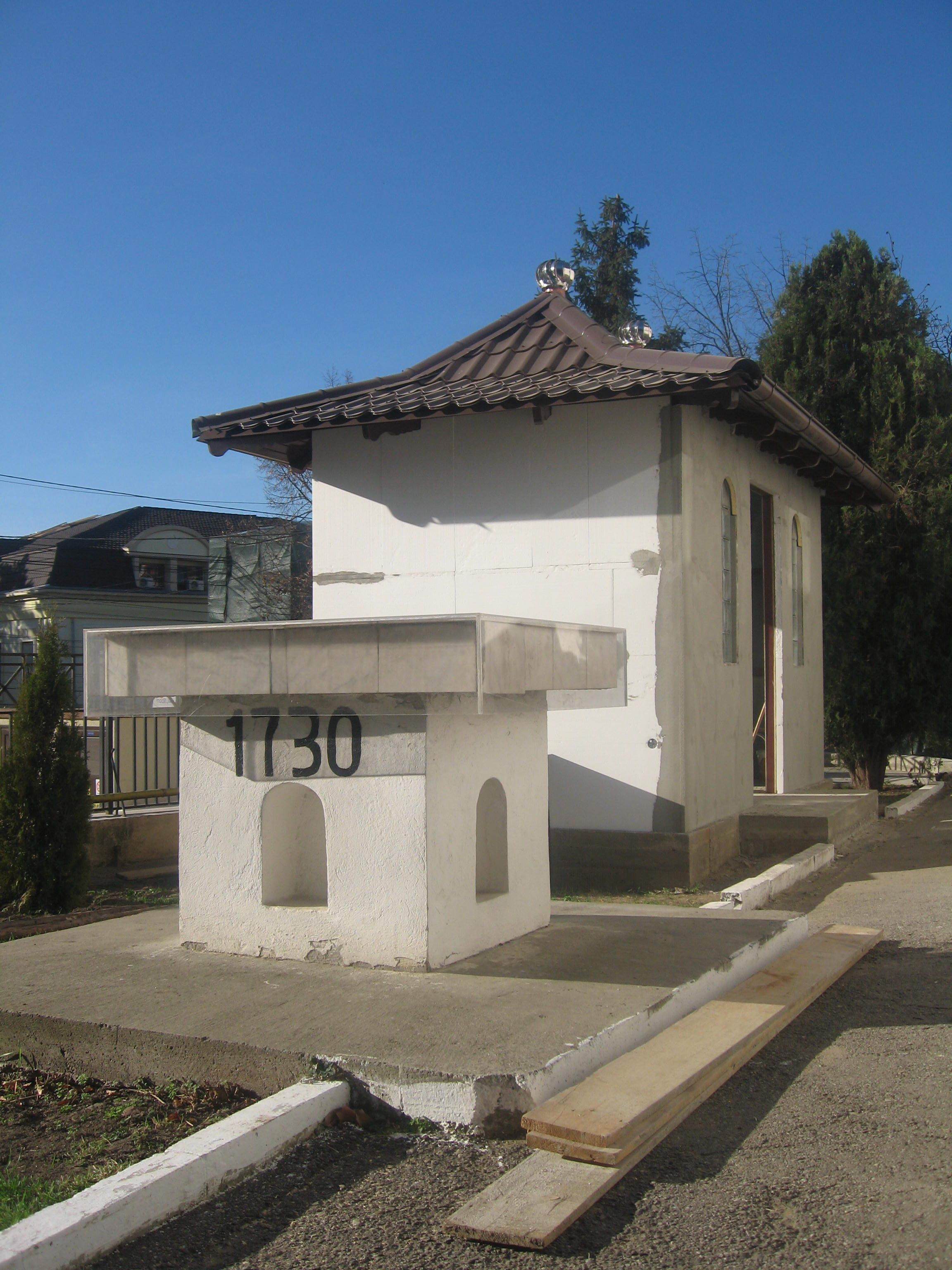
Old altar site

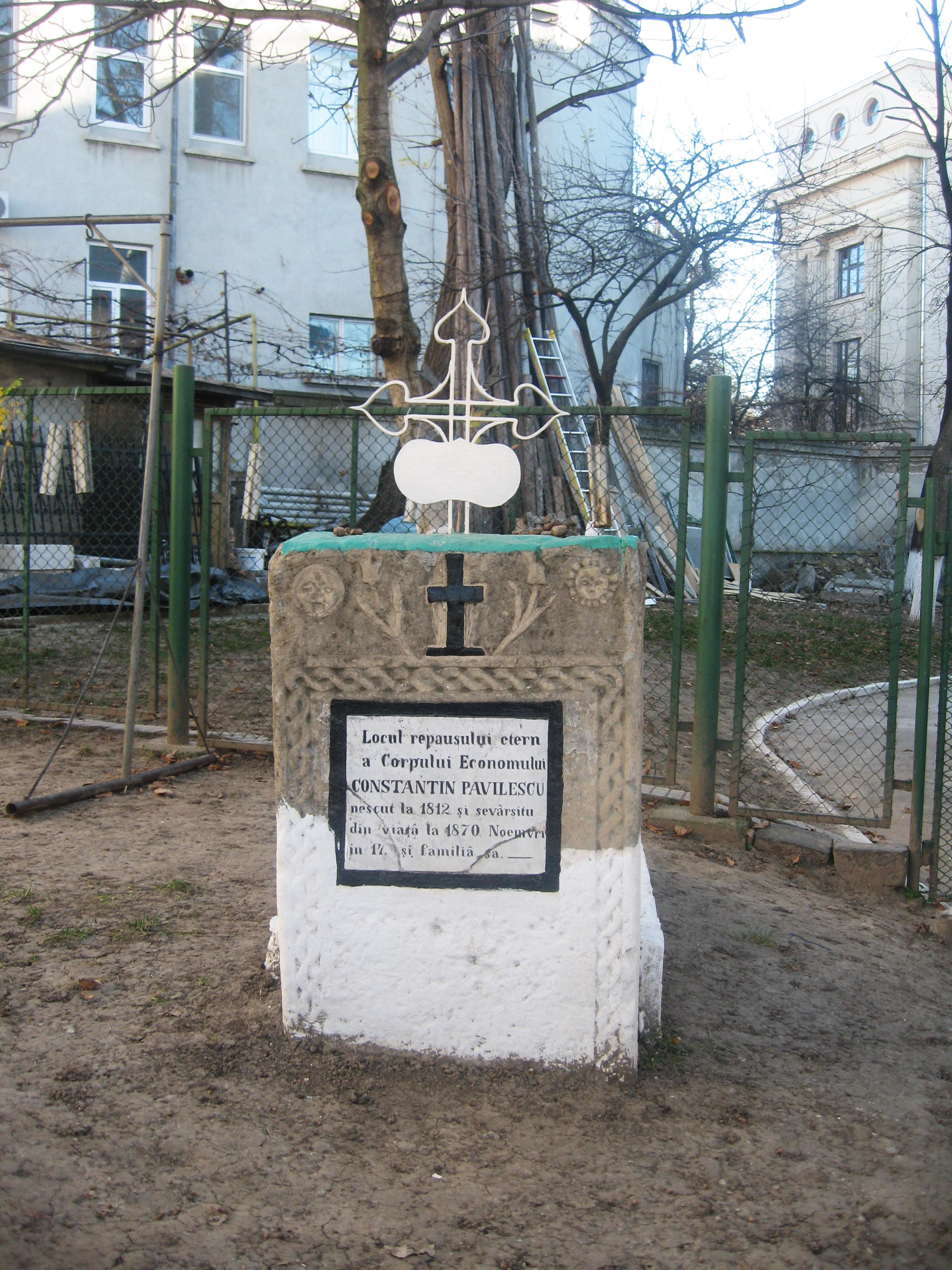
Pavelescu grave

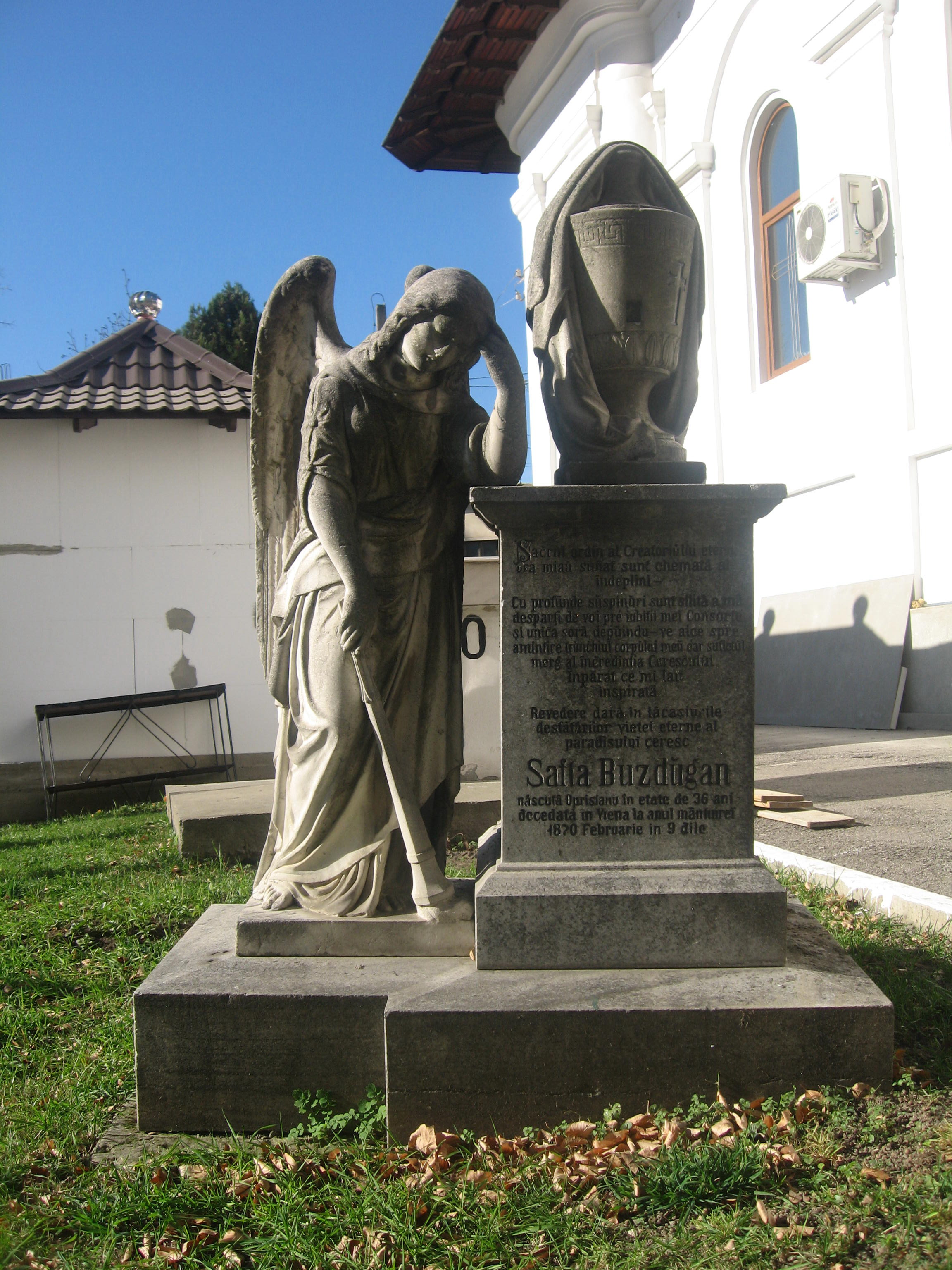
Buzdugan family grave
