= Saint Spyridon Church, Iași =

Heritage site in Iași County, Romania

Coordinates: 47.1682°N 27.5825°E

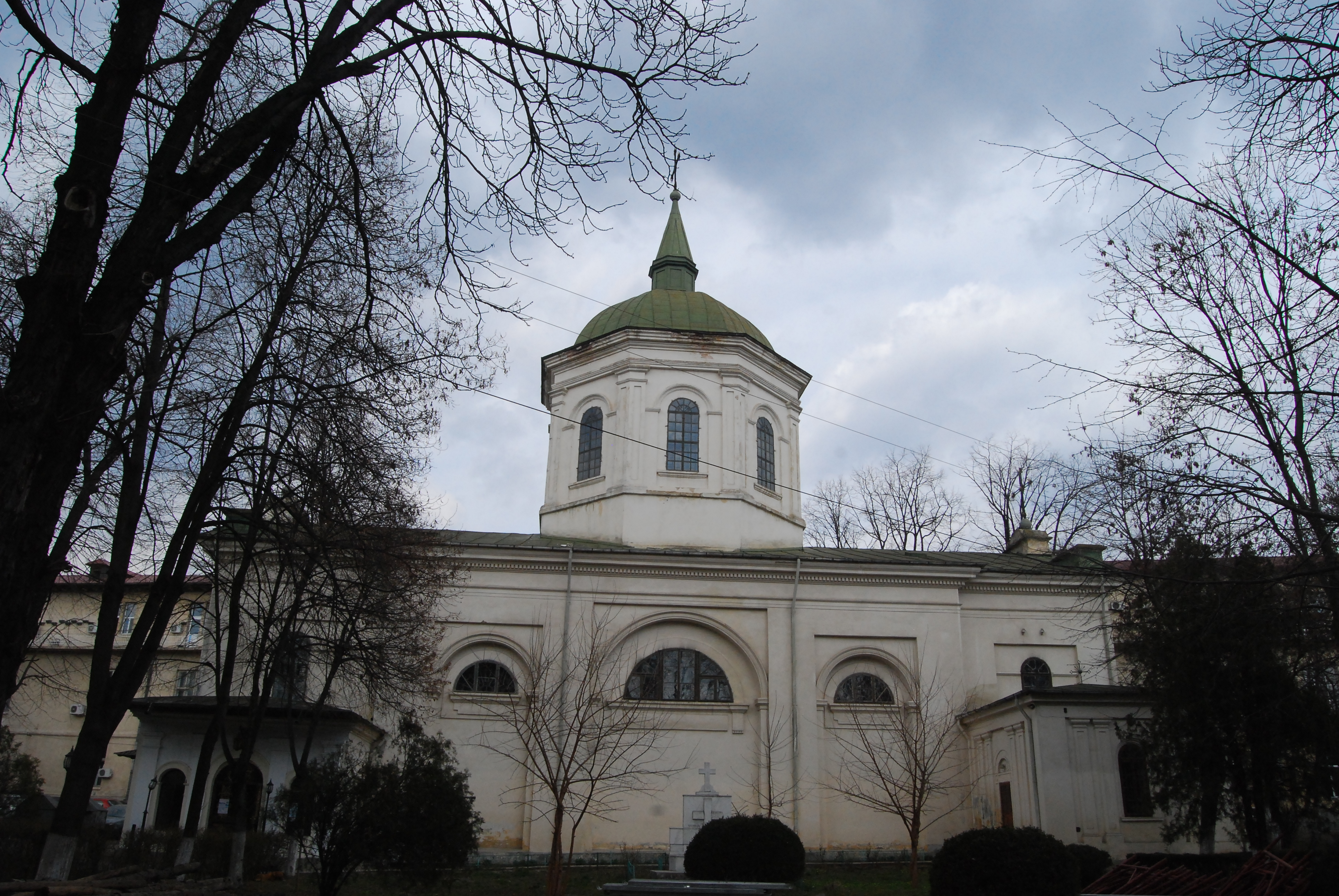
Saint Spyridon Church

Saint Spyridon Church (Romanian: Biserica Sfântul Spiridon) is a Romanian Orthodox church located at 1 Independenței Boulevard in Iași, Romania. The church is dedicated to Saint Spyridon, its history is linked to that of the nearby Sfântul Spiridon Hospital.

The original church on the site was built between 1752 and 1758. Funds were supplied by the learned boyar Ștefan Bosie, whom the expense bankrupted; he was later joined by hetman Vasile Ruset and the merchant Anastasie Lipscanul of Corfu. The ktitors also founded the hospital, Iași's first, in 1757. This took place during the rule of Prince Constantin Racoviță, who issued the decree ordering construction. It is unknown why the somewhat unusual name of Spyridon was selected: this is possibly because he was the patron saint of the Ghica family, or because his canon was printed at Iași in 1750. The church was initially used as a monastery, and in 1763, Ecumenical Patriarch Samuel declared it stauropegic, making its archimandrite the titular bishop of Irenopolis. In 1770, during the Russo-Turkish War, the Russian army was quartered inside the building.

The church was gravely damaged in the 1802 Vrancea earthquake, demolished in late 1804 and completely rebuilt in 1807. It was repaired in 1862, 1938, 1976 and 1990. The bell tower dates to 1786, a conclusion drawn from the presence of Alexandru Mavrocordat Firaris' coat of arms. A date of 1757 has also been proposed, coinciding with the surrounding wall built by Racoviță. It is shaped like the reed cap worn by Saint Spyridon; at first resembling a Russian onion dome, the present shape was fixed in 1862. Initially, its tip featured a crescent, the idea being to offer a certain protection against Ottoman attacks. In 1807, when the structure was rebuilt, this was replaced by an eye within a triangle, a symbol of divinity. The Parisian clock was added after 1830, in line with an express provision of Regulamentul Organic. The roof's current form also dates to 1862. Twin fountains, inscribed in Greek, Ottoman Turkish and Romanian Cyrillic, were added by Grigore III Ghica in 1765; the water flowed along a tiled path from what is now the Botanical Garden.

Architecturally, rectangular forms predominate. The interior features a central nave flanked by two smaller side naves. The mural frescoes beneath the cupola depict the Four Evangelists, while the cupola ceiling shows Christ Pantocrator and the altar has the Holy Trinity. The ornamented marble imitation from the interior dates to 1863. During the same period, Eustație Altini executed the iconostasis painting. In 1863, Dimitrie Ghica had the iconostasis repaired and coated in gold. The church property includes valuable items such as worship items in precious metals, vestments, and sacred books decorated with gilt silver and Biblical scenes in porcelain enamel. The body of Grigore Ghica, beheaded by the Ottomans in 1777, is buried inside the church, while his head was taken to Istanbul. There Greek inscription mentions a "premature death", while the sculpted palm branches signify martyrdom.

Both the church and the bell tower are listed as historic monuments by Romania's Ministry of Culture and Religious Affairs.

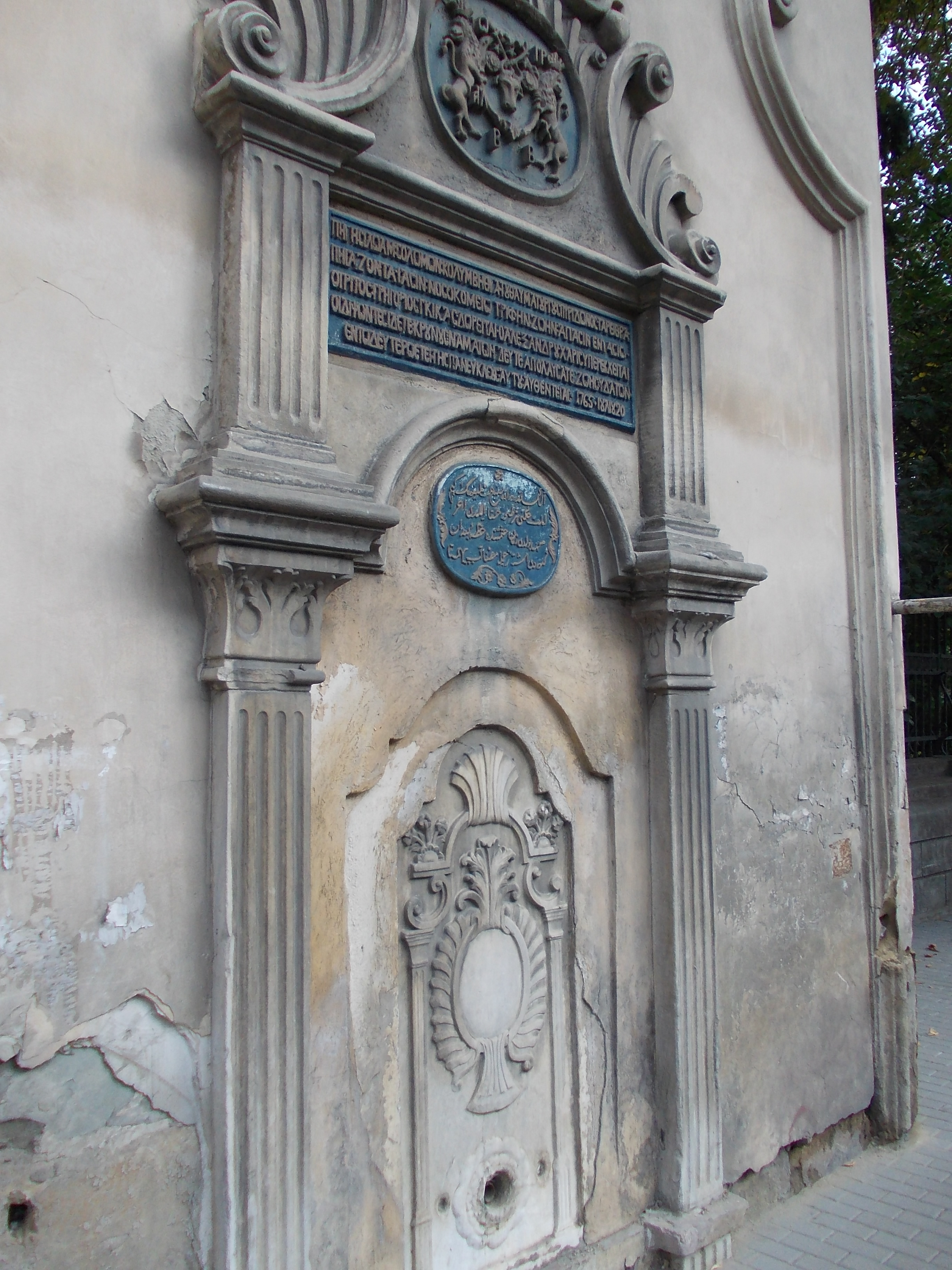
Bell tower (detail)

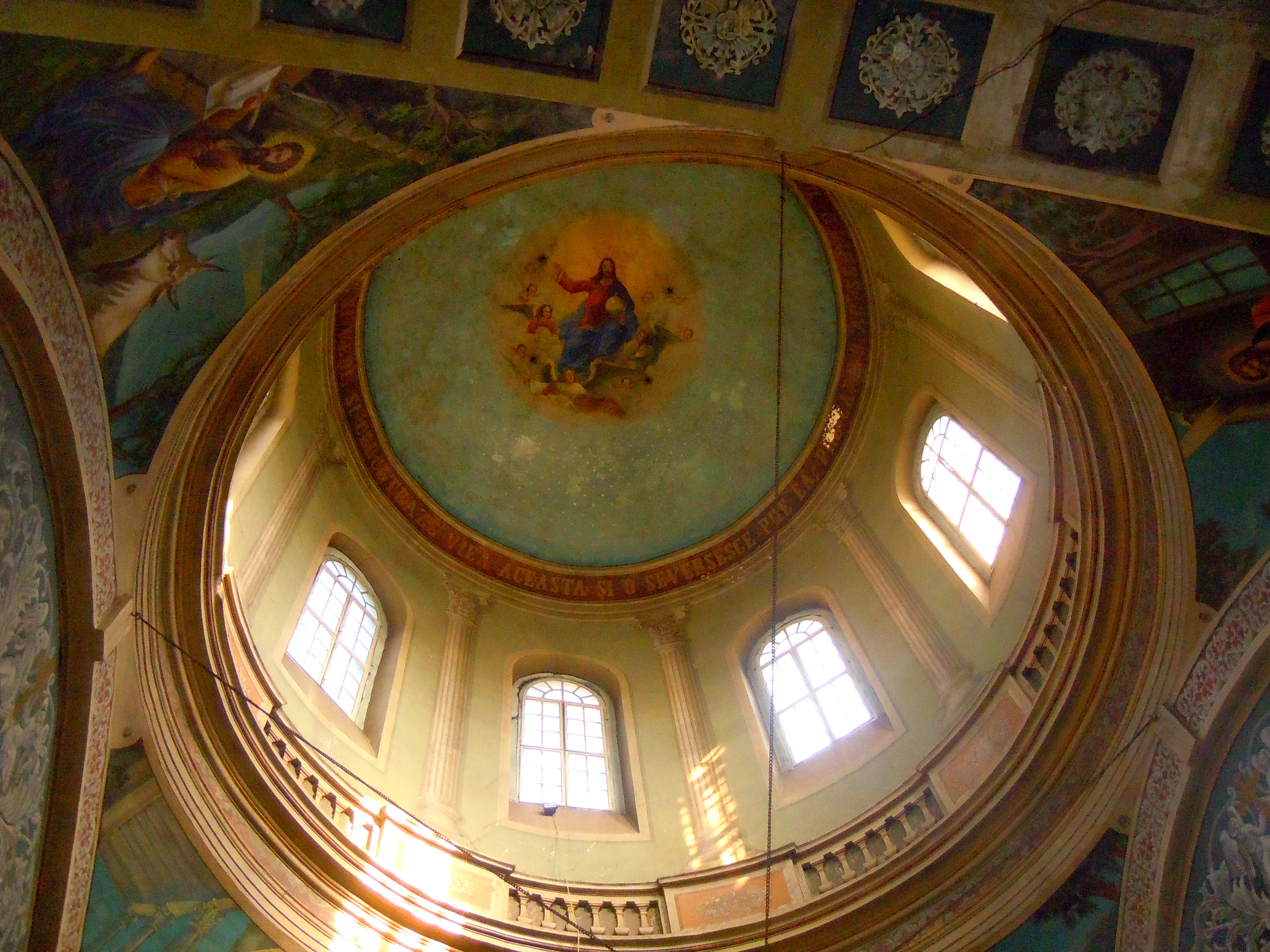
Cupola

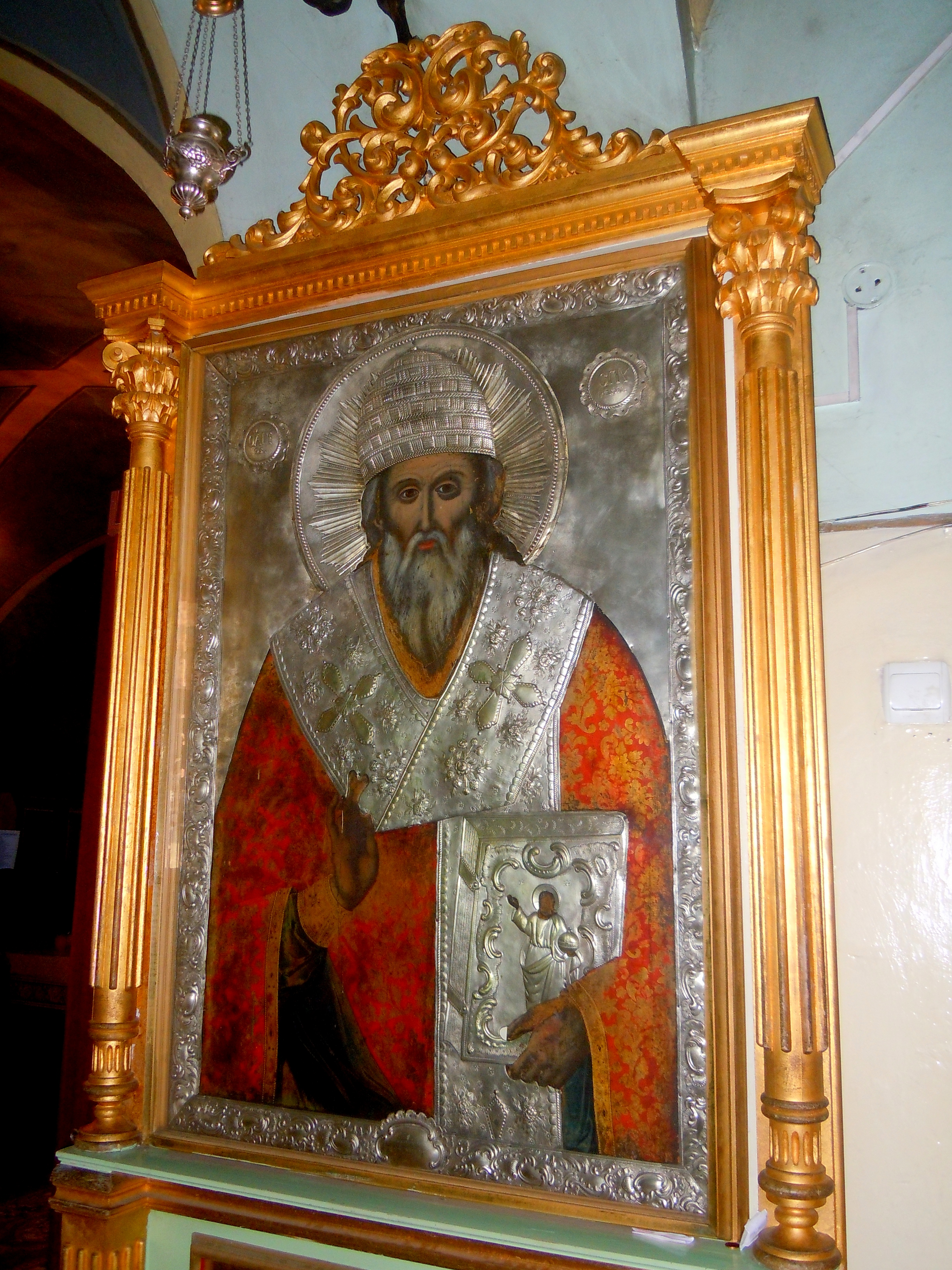
Icon of Saint Spyridon

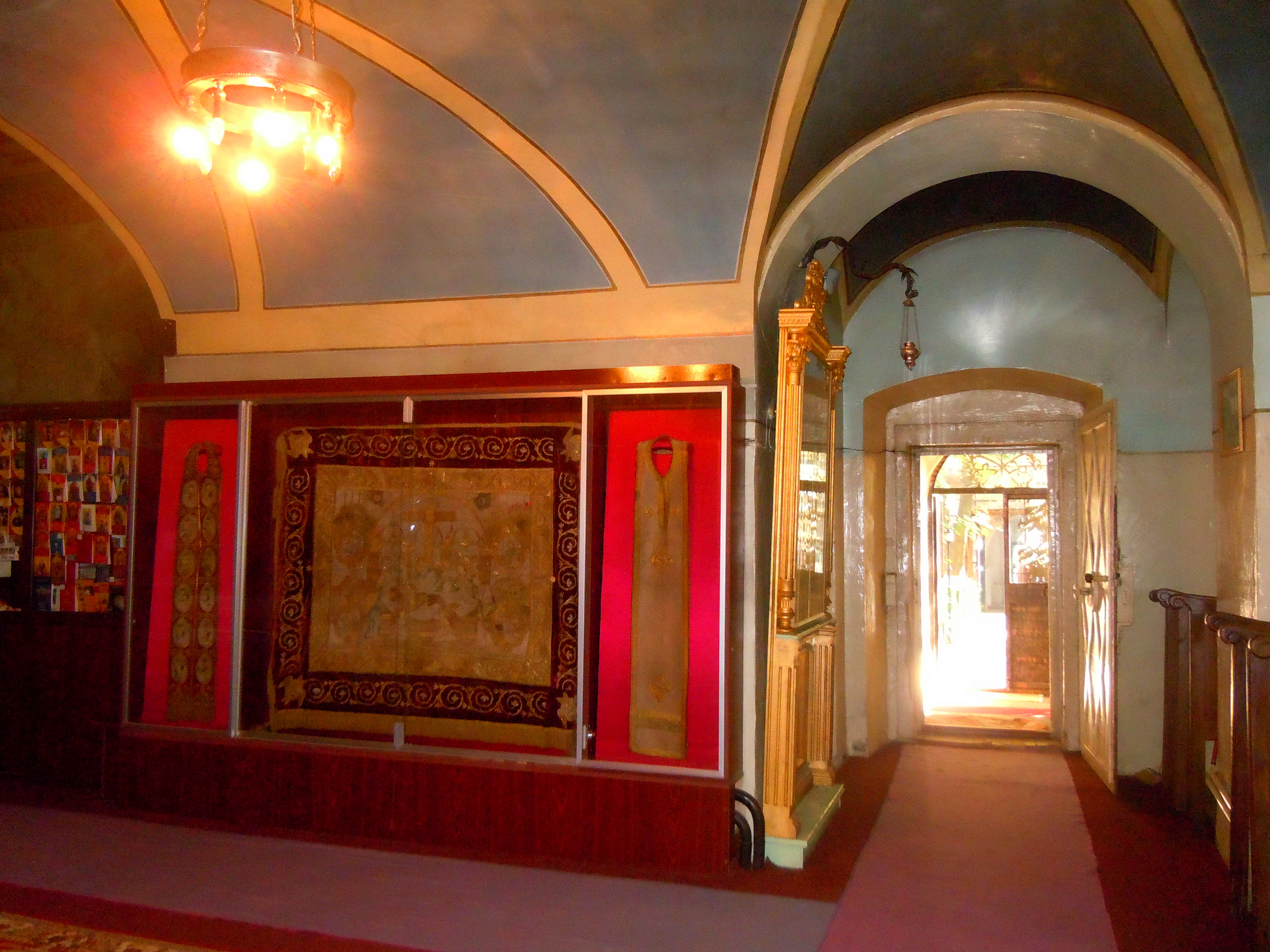
Valuables on display
