= Timotej of Debar and Kichevo =

Macedonian Orthodox prelate (1951–2024)

Timotej
- Metropolitan of Debar and Kichevo
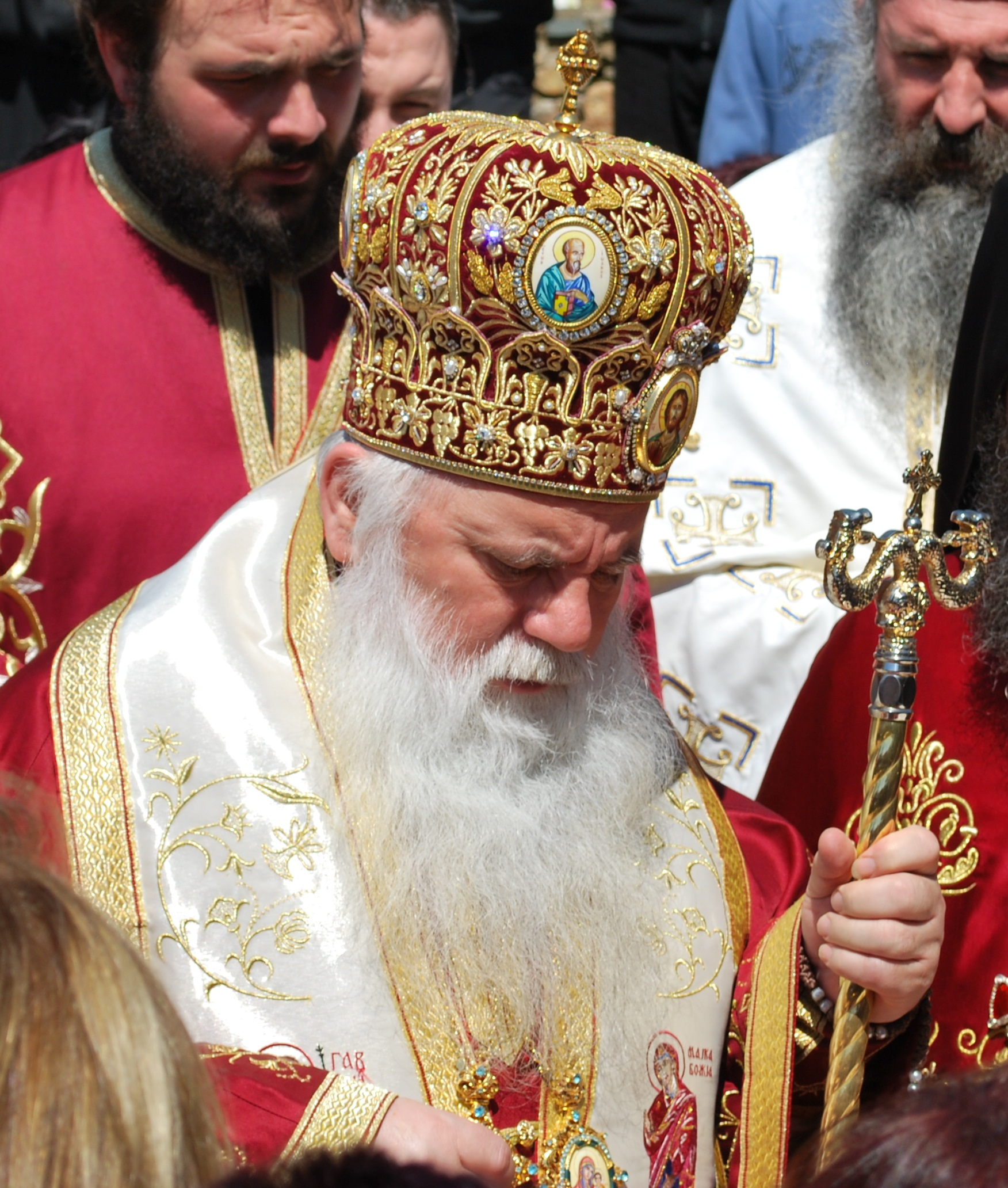
- Timotej in 2011
- Church: Macedonian
- Diocese: Debar and Kichevo
- Installed: 1995
- Term ended: 25 November 2024
- Predecessor: Angelarij (Cvetko Krsteski)
- Successor: Georgij (Gjoko Gjorgjevski)

Personal details
- Born: Slave Jovanovski; 20 October 1951 Kumanovo, PR Macedonia, FPR Yugoslavia
- Died: 25 November 2024 (aged 73) Skopje, North Macedonia
- Denomination: Eastern Orthodoxy
- Residence: Ohrid
- Parents: Aleksandar and Ljuba Jovanovski
- Occupation: Metropolitan of MOC-OA
- Education: University of Skopje

Timotej of Debar and Kichevo (Macedonian: Тимотеј Дебарско-кичевски; born Slave Jovanovski; 20 October 1951 – 25 November 2024) was the Metropolitan of the Diocese of Debar and Kichevo which is part of the Macedonian Orthodox Church. He was born in Mlado Nagorichane, Kumanovo, Republic of North Macedonia. Timotej died from heart disease in Skopje, on 25 November 2024, at the age of 73.

== See also ==
- Ohrid
- Republic of North Macedonia
