= Saint Paraskevi =

Saint Paraskevi may refer to:

== People ==
- List of saints named Paraskevi

== Churches ==
=== Albania ===
- St. Paraskevi's Church, Balldren, Balldren, Lezhë District
- St. Paraskevi's Church, Çetë, Çetë, Kavajë District
- St. Paraskevi's Church, Hllomo, Hllomo, Gjirokastër District
- St. Paraskevi's Church, Hoxharë, Hoxharë, Fier District
- St. Paraskevi's Church, Përmet, Përmet, Përmet District
- St. Paraskevi's Church, Selckë, Selckë, Gjirokastër District
- St. Paraskevi's Church, Valësh, Valësh, Elbasan District

=== Bulgaria ===
- Church of St Petka of the Saddlers, Sofia
- Church of St Petka, Vukovo, Vukovo, Kyustendil Province
- Church of Saint Paraskevi, Nesebar, Ravda, Burgas Province

=== Canada ===
- Saint Petka Serbian Orthodox Church, Lakeshore, Ontario
- St. Petka Serbian Orthodox Parish, a Serbian Orthodox Eparchy of Canada, Saskatoon, Saskatchewan

=== Hungary ===
- Church of Saint Parascheva (17th century), Majs, Hungary

=== Romania ===
- Metropolitan Cathedral, Iași
- Saint Parascheva Church, Desești
- Saint Parascheva Church, Iași
- Saint Parascheva Church, Poienile Izei

=== Serbia ===
- Church of St Petka, Belgrade, Serbia
- Church of St Petka, Dubica, Bosnia-Herzegovina.

=== Ukraine ===
- Piatnytska Church, Chernihiv
- Saint Paraskeva Church, Kozyna, Ternopil Oblast
- Saint Paraskeva Church, Krohulets
- St. Paraskeva Church, Lviv
- Saint Paraskeva Church, Velykyi Kliuchiv
- Saint Paraskevi of Serbia (1820), wooden church with a belfry in Ivano-Frankivsk Oblast, Ukraine

=== Other places ===
- St. Petka's Church, Šidski Banovci, Croatia
- Monastery of Saint Paraskevi (Vikos), a monastery in the Zagori region, Greece
- St. Petka Church, Cerovo, a small church in North Macedonia, near the town of Gostivar
- St. Petka Church, Gostivar, a church in North Macedonia
- Church of St. Paraskevi, Novgorod, Russia
- Büyükdere Ayias Paraskevi Orthodox Church, Büyükdere, Sarıyer, İstanbul Province, Turkey
- Church of St. Paraskevi, Estonia
- Church of St. James and St. Paraskevi, The Hague (The Netherlands)

== See also ==
- Agia Paraskevi (disambiguation), places and churches in Greece, named after Saint Paraskevi of Rome
