= Mlado Nagoričane =

Mlado Nagoričane Младо Нагоричане
- Village
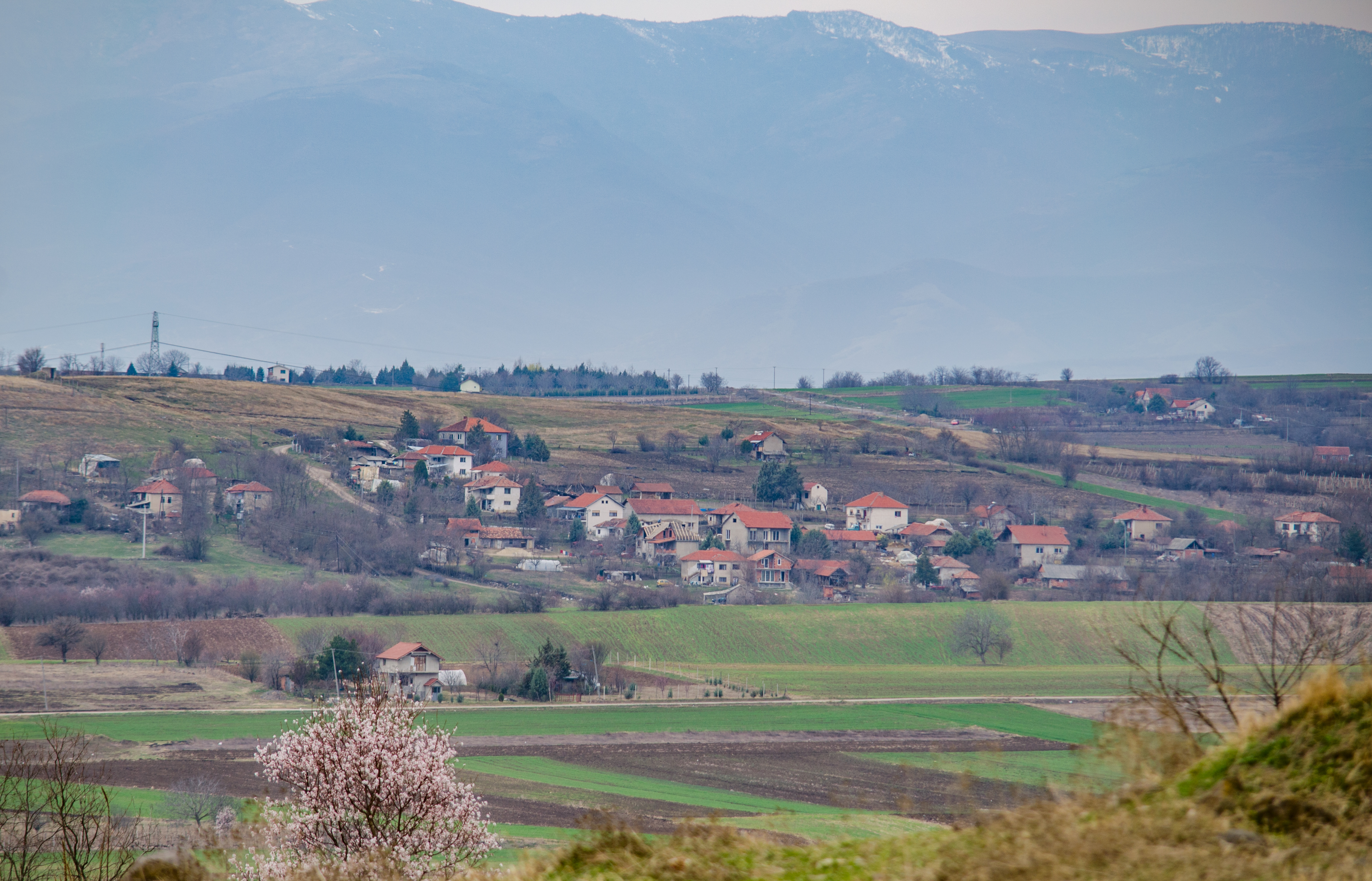
- View of part of the village

- Location within North Macedonia
- Country: North Macedonia
- Region: Northeastern
- Municipality: Staro Nagoričane

Population (2002)
  - Total: 1,292
- Time zone: UTC+1 (CET)
  - Summer (DST): UTC+2 (CEST)
- Car plates: KU

Mlado Nagoričane (Macedonian: Младо Нагоричане) is the largest village in the municipality of Staro Nagoričane, North Macedonia.

== History ==
Mlado Nagoričane area has been inhabited for thousands of years. The Kostoperska Karpa, a large basaltic megalithic site, dates back to the Chalcolithic age. Kostoperska Karpa is found along an ancient route from Skopje to Sofia.

In the nearby town of Gradište, ancient ritualistic Hellenistic sites dating to the Macedonian Empire have been found. This includes a ritual dining complex. The complex contained bones from wild boars, goats, and other animals. These are believed to suggest ritual feasting was done at the site. Pottery, including pithoi, have also been found, such as one depicting Demeter.

== Demographics ==
According to the 2002 census, the village had a total of 1,292 inhabitants. Ethnic groups in the village include:

- Macedonians 1,273
- Serbs 17
- Albanians 1
- Others 1

== Notable people ==
- Timotej of Debar and Kichevo
