= Eustație Altini =

Moldavian painter (c. 1772–1815)

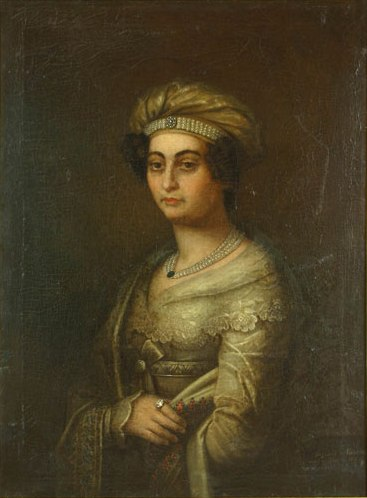
- Portrait of a Woman
- Born: 1772; Zagora, Ottoman Empire
- Died: 1815 (aged 42–43); Iași, Moldavia
- Movement: Romanian Art

Eustație Altini (Greek: Ευστάθιος Αλτίνης; c.1772, Zagora – 1815, Iași) was a Moldavian painter of Greek ancestry; specializing in decorative art and iconostases. He studied in Austria with famous painters Heinrich Friedrich Füger, Johann Baptist Lampi and Hubert Maurer. He was one of few Greek painters to migrate outside of Greece, others included El Greco and Belisario Corenzio. His work completely escaped the typical Greek mannerisms prevalent in the work of his contemporaries. He adapted a unique style mainly influenced by German Austrian art. He influenced 19th-century Romanian art.

== Life and work ==
He was born in Zagora, when it was still part of the Ottoman Empire (now in Greece). In 1780, following the Orlov Revolt and continued Russian involvement in Greece, supporters of Greek independence were persecuted, so his family fled to Iași, the capital of Moldavia, which, at that time, was under control of the Phanariots. There, he first studied art with a local painter named Nicolae.

His talent attracted attention so, in 1789, with the support of Alexander Ypsilantis, Voivode of Wallachia, he was able to go to Vienna to enroll at the Academy of Fine Arts. There, he studied with Heinrich Friedrich Füger, Johann Baptist Lampi and Hubert Maurer. This was his first major exposure to Western art. Later, he would successfully incorporate perspective and chiaroscuro into traditional icon painting. As Iași was under Russian occupation during that period, Prince Grigory Potemkin has also been credited as being his patron. This, however, has not been verified.

In 1802, he created his first known iconostasis at Banu Church in Iași. It was commissioned by Iacob Stamati (1748-1803), the Metropolitan of Moldavia, who was an admirer of the Russian Enlightenment. Some of his best-known iconostases were those created for Saint Spyridon Church in 1813, one of which depicted an episode in the life of Metropolitan Veniamin Costache, who had commissioned the work.

He also created decorations for the Roman Episcopal Cathedral, at the request of Gherasim Clipa-Barbovschi, the Bishop of Huși, and produced a few portraits of a non-religious nature; mostly of women. During his last years, he led a painting class at the Princely Academy of Iași.

== Gallery ==
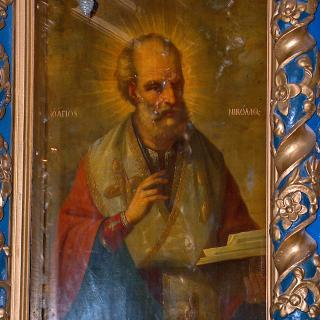
Saint Nikolas

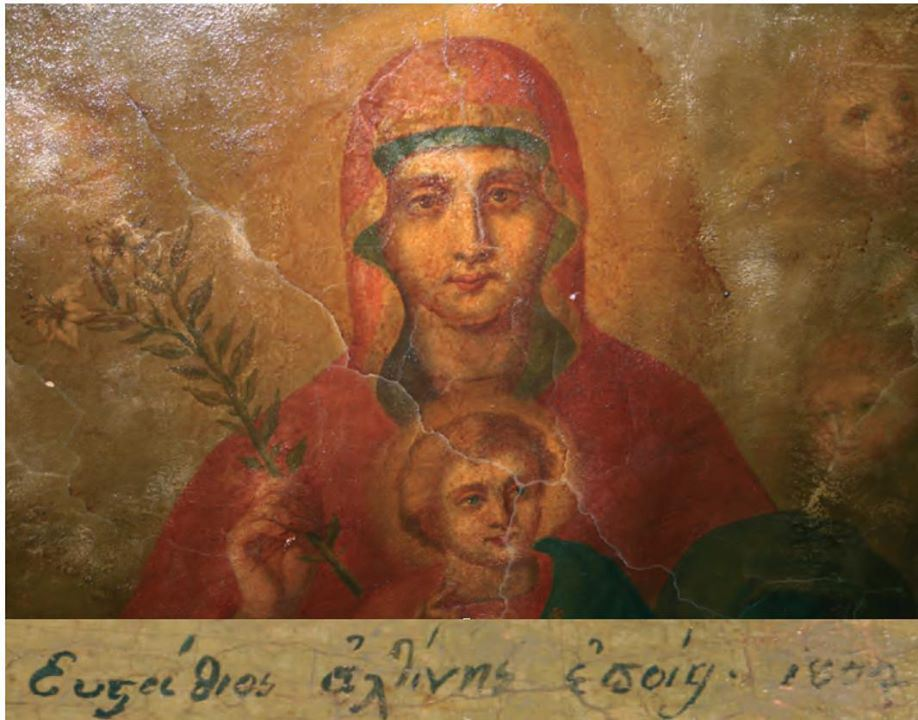
"Panagia" (Mary and Jesus),
Banu Church, Iași

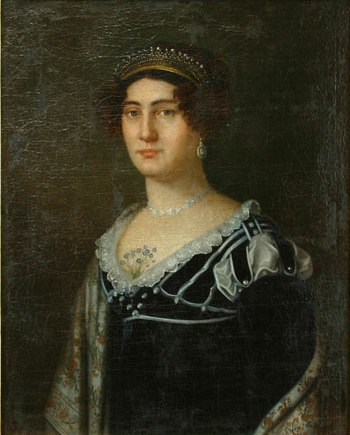
Portrait of Safta Costachi Talpan

== Sources ==
- Corinne Julien, Histoire de l'humanité, Vol.6, UNESCO, 2000 ISBN 978-92-320-2815-0 pg.888 (Online)
- Remus Niculescu, "Altini, Eustatie", Oxford Art Online, Oxford University Press, 2003 ISBN 978-1-88444-605-4 (Online)
