= Banu Church =

Heritage site in Iași County, Romania

Coordinates: 47.1677°N 27.5779°E

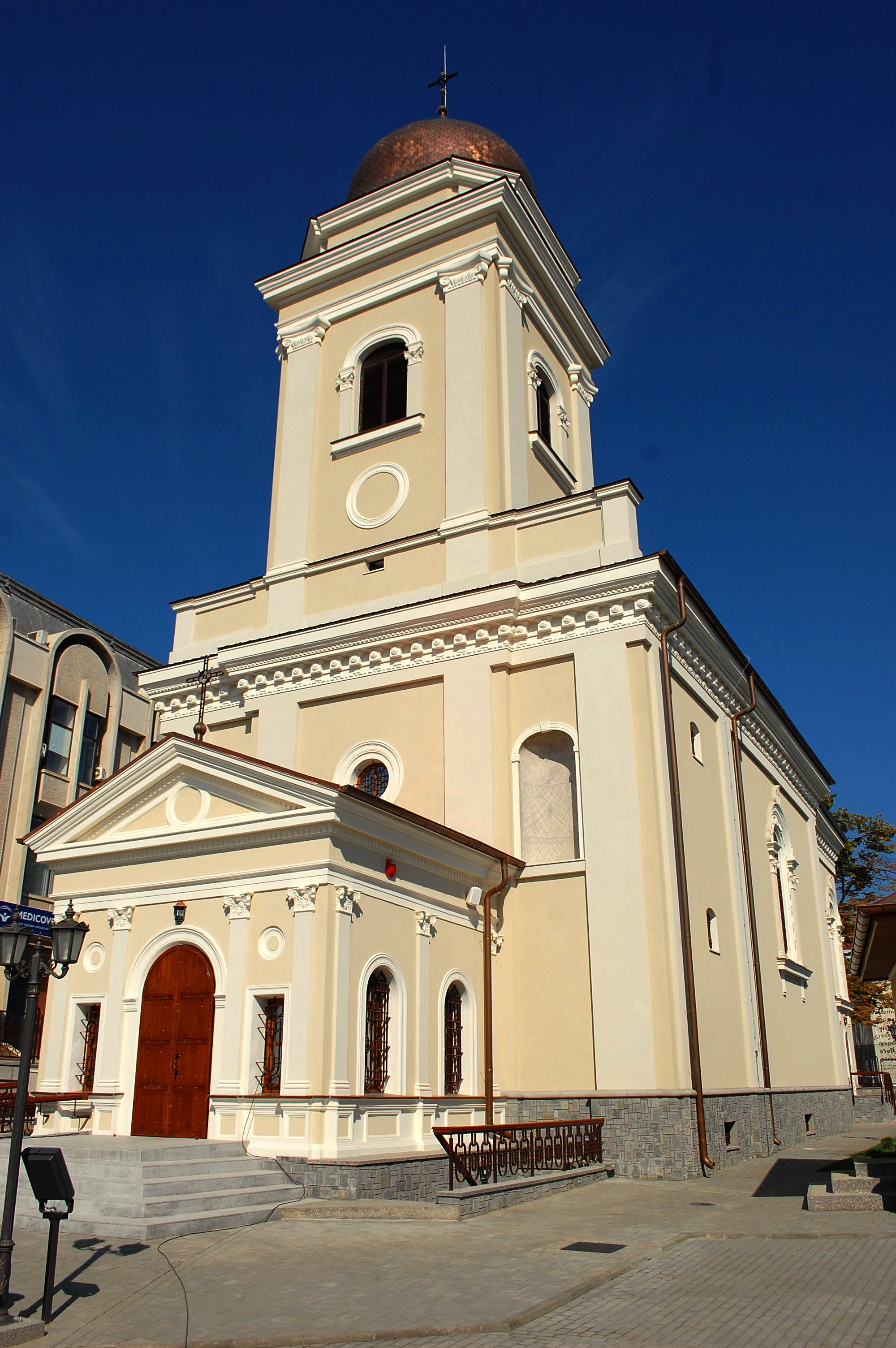
Banu Church

The Banu Church (Romanian: Biserica Banu) is a Romanian Orthodox church located at 9 Banu Street in Iași, Romania. It is dedicated to All Saints' Day.

== Wooden church ==
The first church on the site was built of oak beams in 1704 by the great ban Savin Zmucila, and had its own graveyard. His title is the source of the nickname. It was blessed by Metropolitan Misail the same year, and it was dedicated to the Dormition of the Mother of God. As opposed to other churches in the city that belonged to foreign churches and held liturgies in Old Church Slavonic or Greek, services at Banu were in Romanian by Romanian priests from the beginning, partly in sign of protest.

From early on, the church had valuable books and objects, some from Moldavia and others from abroad. These included a 1643 Cazania (book of sermons), a 1681 Molitvelnic (prayer book) and a 1683 Liturghier (liturgy book), all from Iași; as well as a 1699 Gospel Book in Greek and Latin from Bucharest. By 1799, the city's development had made the church too small for its needs, and it was in disrepair.

== Stone church ==
Together with the parishioners, Metropolitan Iacob Stamati contributed a large sum of money for a new church; he also supplied the liturgical objects. An architect was hired from Transylvania, building a structure in the classic Russian style. This appears to be the oldest church in Iași that mentions the architect's name on the inscription: Herr Leopold. The carved linden iconostasis is the work of Eustație Altini, who also painted it in 1802. Early the following year, he began painting the church interior, but the work remained incomplete upon Stamati's death that March. In his will, the metropolitan specified that the church would not be subject to foreign control. The foyer of the present church is where the altar of the previous church was, and its dedication was changed to All Saints' Day. The church is in trefoil plan, with side apses on the interior and a semicircular altar apse. There is a bell tower above the narthex; its Baroque style is common to the region. The original structure has not been modified, only repaired.

The church was closed from 1821 to 1822, early during the Greek War of Independence, which reverberated in Moldavia. During its early years, it was known as the Beggars' Church, after the guild that worshiped there. Repairs were carried out in 1828–1829 and in 1840. At some point after 1859, the exterior was coated in sheet metal. The foyer was repaired in 1882–1883, as mentioned in an inscription. Additionally, a tall wooden baldachin was installed near the altar, so that the area was never subsequently painted. Located to the east, the graveyard functioned until the late 19th century; the National College was built on the site. Urgent repairs were carried out in 1904 and again in 1927, when the church was in serious deterioration. The baldachin was removed in 1937, and the exterior was plastered in 1942. In the early 20th century, the church owned a brewery and a set of valuables donated by Costache Conachi.

A fresh restoration took place in 1948, when Corneliu Baba ordered the painting erased, as it was blackened, peeling and of low artistic value. (A medallion in the vestibule was preserved.) The 1940 Vrancea earthquake had widened an existing crack in the south wall, and the repair filled this with brick. Further repairs took place in 1958, 1966 and 1976. During a plaster repair on the altar in 1968, a mural icon of Madonna and Child was discovered; this was possibly done by Altini in 1803. The 1977 Vrancea earthquake reopened the crack, which was subsequently patched up again. However, after 1981, the crack again widened, and new cracks appeared on the north face around the bell tower. After earthquakes in 1986 and 1990, these cracks also became larger. Further repairs began in 1990, in order to consolidate the structure.

The church is listed as a historic monument by Romania's Ministry of Culture and Religious Affairs.

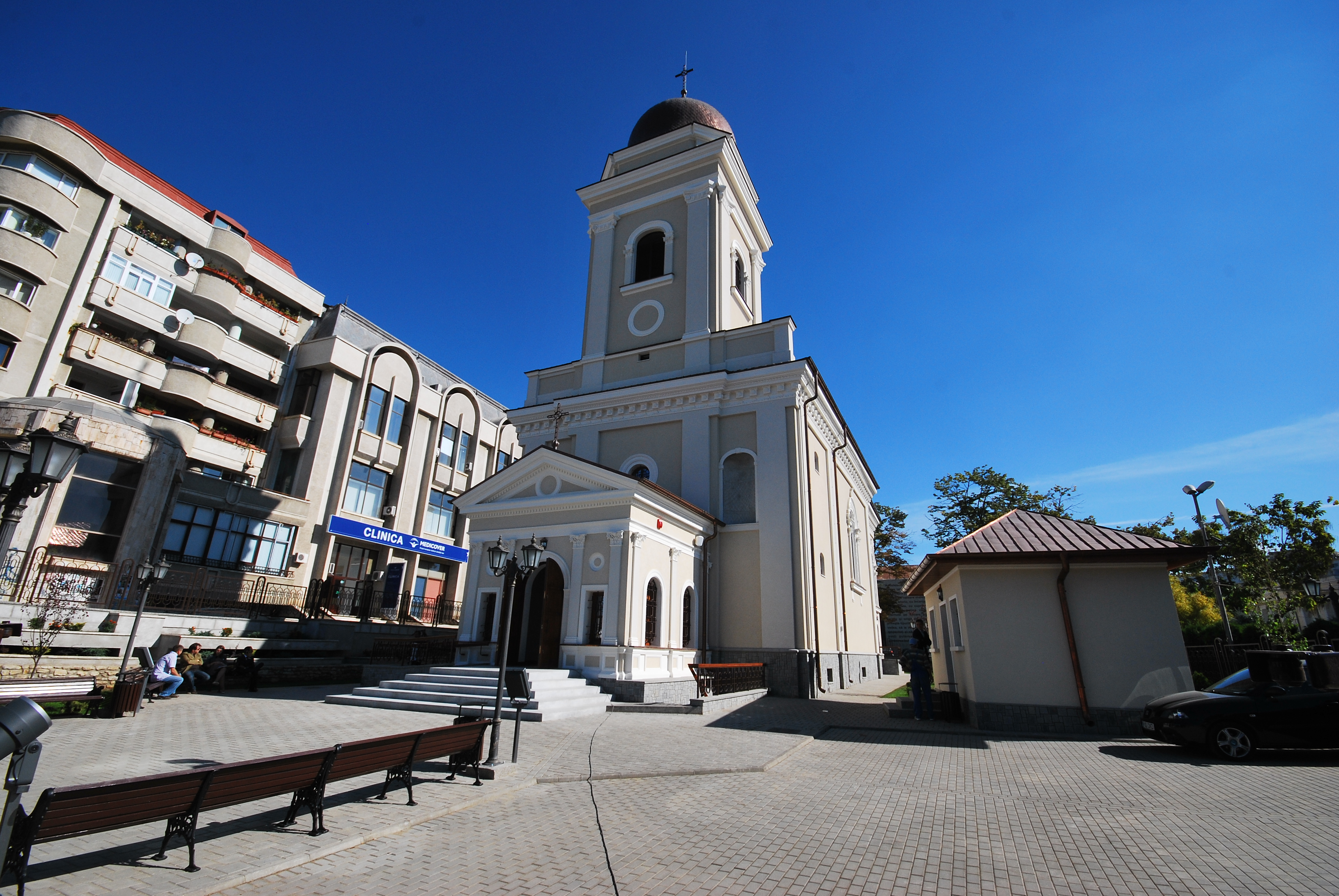
Setting

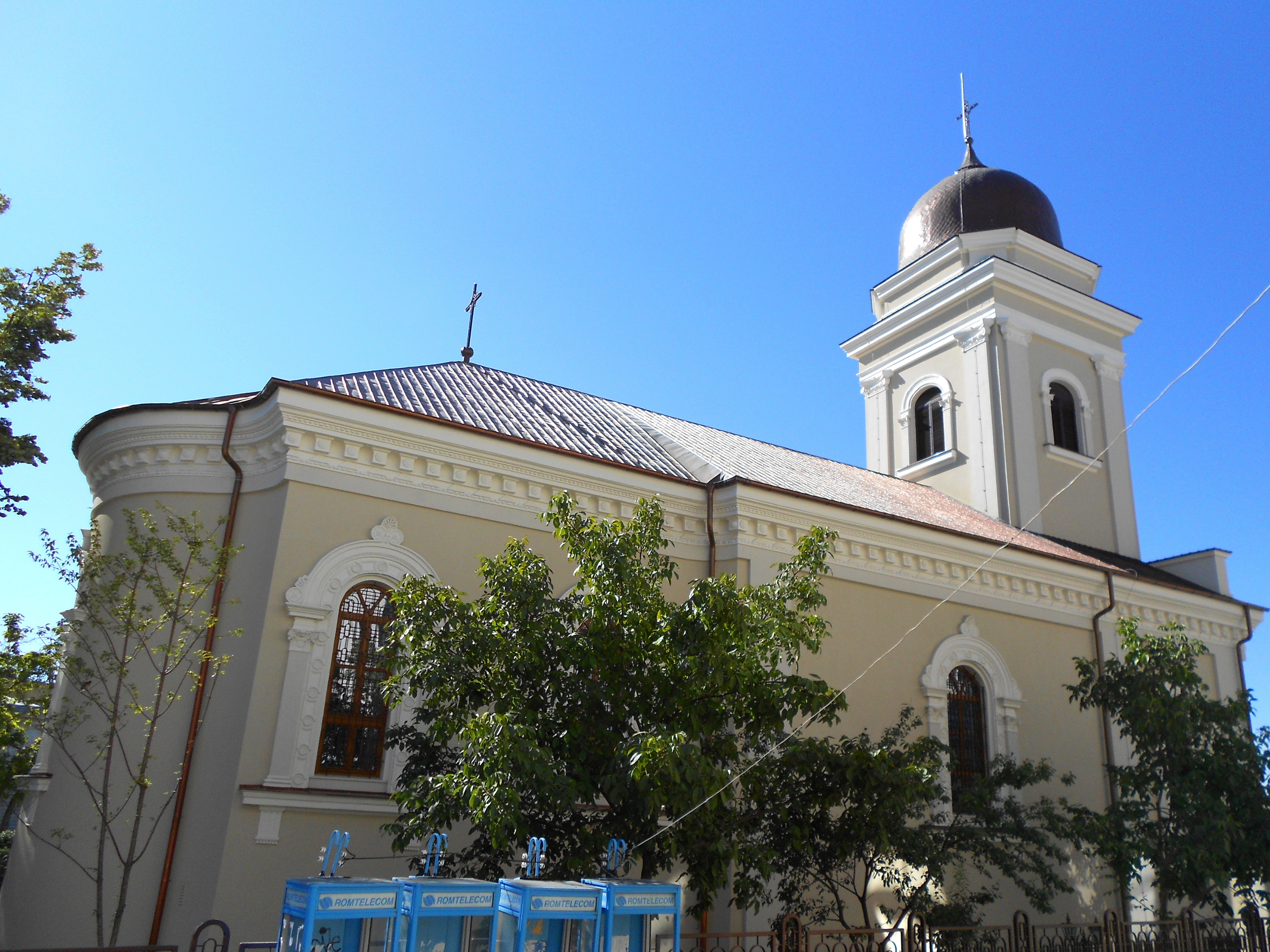
Side view

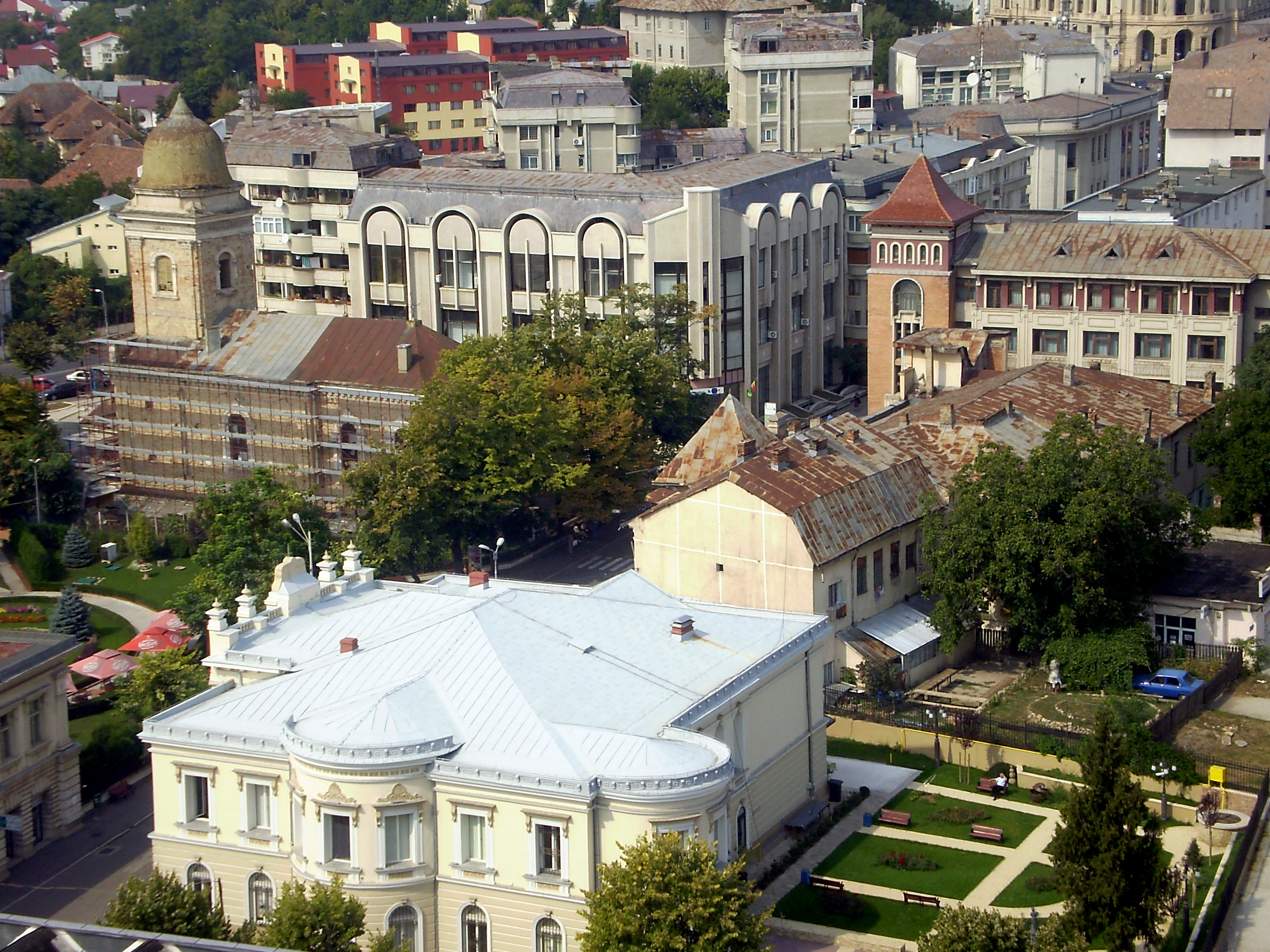
Panorama (prior to restoration)
