= Halveti Teqe =

Halveti Teqe may refer to:

- Halveti Teqe, Berat
- Halveti Teqe, Herebel
- Halveti Teqe, Prizren
