= St Saviour's Church, Kërçishti i Epërm =

Cultural monument of Albania

St. Saviour's Church
- Kisha e Shën Sotirit (Albanian); Црква „Свети Спас“ (Macedonian)
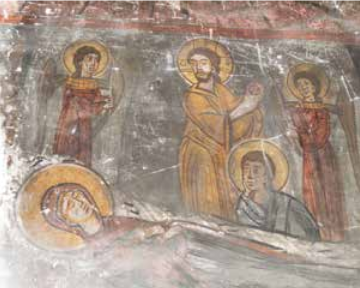
- Interactive map of St. Saviour's Church
- 41.583°N 20.520°E
- Location: Kërçisht

History
- Built: 1232

Cultural Monument of Albania
- Designated: 1970

St Saviour's Church (Albanian: Kisha e Shën Sotirit; Macedonian: Црква „Свети Спас“) is a church in Kërçishti i Epërm, Dibër County, Albania. It was designated a Cultural Monument of Albania in 1970.

The annual holiday Spasovden is celebrated at the church by the Macedonian Orthodox population.
