= Vojnik, Dibër =

Vojnik
- Village
- Location within Albania
- Coordinates: 41.58116766044339°N 20.4570159630185741°E
- Country: Albania
- County: Dibër
- Municipality: Dibër
- Administrative unit: Maqellarë

Population (2007)
  - Total: 715
- Time zone: UTC+1 (CET)
  - Summer (DST): UTC+2 (CEST)

Vojnik (Albanian: Vojnik) is a village in the Republic of Albania, Dibër municipality.

== Geography ==
The village is located in the historical and geographical region of Dibër, on the border with North Macedonia.

== History ==
According to Vasil Kanchov (" Macedonia. Ethnography and Statistics "), 230 Muslim Albanians live in Vojnik.

During the First World War, the Austro-Hungarian military authorities conducted a census in 1916–1918 in the occupied parts of Albania and Vojnik was registered as a village with 263 Albanians and 16 Gypsies, a total of 279 Muslims. Linguists Klaus Steinke and Xhelal Ylli consider the census results to be accurate.

Until 2015, the village was part of the municipality of Maqellarë.
