= Herebel =

Herebel Ербеле
- Village
- Location within Albania
- Coordinates: 41°37′11″N 20°28′11″E
- Country: Albania
- County: Dibër
- Municipality: Dibër
- Administrative unit: Maqellarë
- Time zone: UTC+1 (CET)
  - Summer (DST): UTC+2 (CEST)

Herebel (Macedonian: Ербеле; Bulgarian: Ърбеле) is a village in the former Maqellarë municipality in Dibër County in northeastern Albania. At the 2015 local government reform it became part of the municipality Dibër. It is situated on the mountain Dešat, near the border with North Macedonia.

== History ==
The village was first mentioned in 1467 in Ottoman records. In 1583, it was recorded as having 18 Christian and four Muslim residents.

Of all of the local villages during the late 19th and early 20th centuries, while still under the Ottoman Empire, only Herebel and Kërçisht i Sipërm were populated by Bulgarian Exarchists, while the rest were populated by Muslims.

Several members of the Macedonian-Adrianopolitan Volunteer Corps were born in Herebel.

== Demographics ==
In statistics gathered by Vasil Kanchov in 1900, the village of Herebel was inhabited by 75 Christian Bulgarians and 125 Muslim Bulgarians. However, Kanchov noted that the inhabitants of the village preferred to be called Albanians and that they spoke Albanian.

During the first World War occupying Austro-Hungarian forces conducted a census (1916-1918) of parts of Albania they held and of Herebel its ethnic demographics they recorded 74 Albanians, 136 others, 3 Romani while its religious composition was 77 Muslims and 136 Orthodox Christians. Linguists Klaus Steinke and Xhelal Ylli consider the overall census results to be accurate and reflective of much of the ethnic and religious demographics of the area during that time, however noting that the then identity of the Orthodox Slavic speaking populace was fluid as reflected in census declarations. Toward the end of the 1920s the Orthodox Slavic speaking population was located in only two villages of the Maqellarë area, Kërçisht i Epërm and Herebel while in the 1930s the population decline of Orthodox Slavophones continued.

In the late 1990s, Macedonian was still spoken in Herebel, while a population of Muslim Albanians also resides in the settlement.

During the 2000s linguists Klaus Steinke and Xhelal Ylli seeking to corroborate villages cited in past literature as being Slavic speaking carried out fieldwork in villages of the area. The village of Herebel has only 6 Orthodox Slavic speaking families made up of 3 larger households of around 20 individuals each. Linguists Steinke and Ylli also noted that unlike the Gollobordë region, the villages of the Maqellarë administrative unit area do not have any Muslim Slavic speaking inhabitants.

== Culture ==
Herebel is home to two Cultural Monuments of Albania, the Church of the Holy Transfiguration and the Halveti Teqe.

== People from Herebel ==
- Krsto Aleksov, member of the Internal Macedonian Revolutionary Organization
