= Kërçisht i Sipërm =

Kërçisht i Sipërm Горно Крчиште
- Village
- Location within Albania
- Coordinates: 41°34′57″N 20°31′02″E
- Country: Albania
- County: Dibër
- Municipality: Dibër
- Administrative unit: Maqellarë
- Time zone: UTC+1 (CET)
  - Summer (DST): UTC+2 (CEST)

Kërçisht i Sipërm (Macedonian: Горно Крчиште/Gorno Krčište) is a village in the former Maqellarë Municipality in Dibër County in northeastern Albania. At the 2015 local government reform it became part of the municipality Dibër. It is located near the Macedonian border, on the mountain Dešat.

== History ==
Of all of the local villages during the late 19th and early 20th centuries, while still under the Ottoman Empire, only Herebel and Kërçishti i Epërm were populated entirely by Bulgarian Exarchists, while the rest were populated by Muslims.

Nearly 40 members of the Macedonian-Adrianopolitan Volunteer Corps were natives of the village and Kërçishti i Poshtëm.

== Demographics ==
During the first World War occupying Austro-Hungarian forces conducted a census (1916-1918) of parts of Albania they held and of Kërçisht i Epërm its ethnic demographics they recorded 23 Albanians, 14 Bulgarians, 197 others while its religious composition was 37 Muslims and 197 Orthodox Christians. Linguists Klaus Steinke and Xhelal Ylli consider the overall census results to be accurate and reflective of much of the ethnic and religious demographics of the area during that time, however noting that the then identity of the Orthodox Slavic speaking populace was fluid as reflected in census declarations. Toward the end of the 1920s the Orthodox Slavic speaking population was located in only two villages of the Maqellarë area, Herbel and Kërçisht i Epërm while in the 1930s the population decline of Orthodox Slavophones continued.

Macedonian was still spoken in the village in the late 90s.

During the 2000s linguists Klaus Steinke and Xhelal Ylli seeking to corroborate villages cited in past literature as being Slavic speaking carried out fieldwork in villages of the area. In Kërçisht i Epërm the village contains 200 inhabitants and 45 households, of which 6 are Orthodox families with a total of 17 Slavic-speaking individuals. On the eve of the collapse of communism in 1991, Kërçisht i Epërm had 110 households with 27 belonging to the Orthodox community.

Use of Macedonian in Kërçisht i Epërm is limited and facing extinction, due to usage being confined to the family. Albanian is also used in family settings especially by younger generations who have limited knowledge of Macedonian due to Albanian school influences and the demographic decline of the Slavic speaking population in the village. Linguists Steinke and Ylli also noted that unlike the Gollobordë region, the villages of the Maqellarë administrative unit area do not have any Muslim Slavic speaking inhabitants.

== Culture ==
The village is home to the Church of the Holy Saviour. Established in 1232, it is a Cultural Monument of Albania.

It also contains churches dedicated to St Demetrius, St Nicholas, St Parascheva, and St Blajse.
