= Kërçisht i Poshtëm =

Kërçisht i Poshtëm Долно Крчиште
- Village
- Location within Albania
- Coordinates: 41°35′10″N 20°30′22″E
- Country: Albania
- County: Dibër
- Municipality: Dibër
- Administrative unit: Maqellarë
- Time zone: UTC+1 (CET)
  - Summer (DST): UTC+2 (CEST)

Kërçisht i Poshtëm is a village in the former Maqellarë Municipality in Dibër County in northeastern Albania. At the 2015 local government reform it became part of the municipality Dibër. It is located near the Macedonian border, on the mountain Dešat.

== History ==
Kërçisht i Poshtëm (Dolna Kërçishta) is recorded in the Ottoman defter of 1467 as a village in the vilayet of Upper Dibra with 13 households. The anthroponymy recorded depicts an overwhelmingly Slavic character, although a single household head bearing a typical Albanian personal name is recorded; Ozgureci, brother of Nenko.

A demographic Bulgarian study published in 1878, reflecting statistics of the male population from 1873, stated that the village's population consisted of 80 households with 76 Bulgarian Christians and 140 Slavic Muslims.

Nearly 40 members of the Macedonian-Adrianopolitan Volunteer Corps were natives of the village and Kërçishti i Epërm.

During the first World War occupying Austro-Hungarian forces conducted a census (1916-1918) of parts of Albania they held and of Kërçisht i Poshtëm its ethnic demographics they recorded 314 Albanians while its religious composition was 314 Muslims. Linguists Klaus Steinke and Xhelal Ylli consider the overall census results to be accurate and reflective of much of the ethnic and religious demographics of the area during that time.

A 1930 report listed the village as having 60 houses.

During the 2000s linguists Klaus Steinke and Xhelal Ylli seeking to corroborate villages cited in past literature as being Slavic speaking carried out fieldwork in villages of the area. Linguists Steinke and Ylli noted that unlike the Gollobordë region, the villages of the Maqellarë administrative unit area do not have any Muslim Slavic speaking inhabitants.
