= Krsto Aleksov =

Macedonian Bulgarian revolutionary

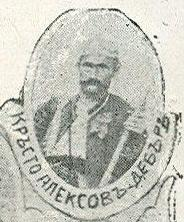
Krsto Aleksov.

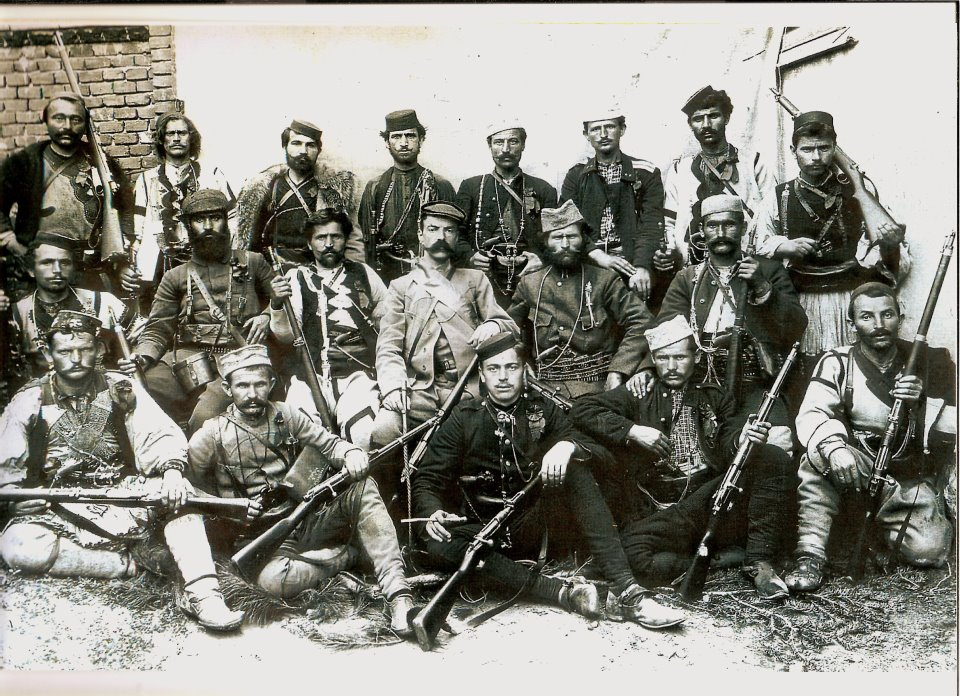
The voivodes of the Bulgarian regiments in Bitola in 1908. Aleksov is in the second row on the right.

Krsto Aleksov (Bulgarian: Кръстьо Алексов, Macedonian: Крсто Алексов; 1877-unknown) was a Macedonian Bulgarian revolutionary of the Internal Macedonian Revolutionary Organization. He is considered an ethnic Macedonian in North Macedonia.

== Biography ==
Aleksov was born in the Ottoman village of Herebel (present-day Albania). As a young man he emigrated to Bulgaria and from 1898 to the spring of 1902 Aleksov lived in Ruse. Here he received a military training in the local rifle company. During the Ilinden Uprising, Aleksov served in a cheta in the Galičnik region. As a revolutionary, later he was active in the Kičevo region. In 1909, he was treated in Sofia, after which he returned to Ottoman Macedonia. Aleksov married Neda Arsova in October 1909 in Kičevo. The last information about him is from a 1918 survey held by the Macedonian Brotherhoods in Bulgaria, when Serbian annexed-Vardar Macedonia was occupied by Bulgaria.
