= List of mayors of Berat =

This is a list of mayors of Berat who have served since the Albanian Declaration of Independence of 1912.

== Mayors (1912–present) ==
No.	Name	Term in office	
1	Ilias Vrioni	1919	1921
2	Yzedin Vrioni	1922	1922
3	Seit Vrioni	1922	1923
4	Yzedin Vrioni	1924	1924
5	Xhevdet Mehqemeja	1924	1924
6	Dhimitër Tutulani	1925	1925
7	Yzedin Vrioni	1925	1925
8	Neki Starova	1926	1926
9	Yzedin Vrioni	1928	1928
10	Neki Starova	1929	1932
11	Abdyl Dilaveri	1933	1934
12	Tef Naraçi	1935	1935
13	Yzedin Vrioni	1935	1935
14	Zenel Prodani	1937	1937
15	Yzedin Vrioni	1937	1937
16	Zenel Prodani	1939	1944
Executive Committee (1944–1992)
17	Ylli Ruli	1992	1996
18	Milika Jaho	1996	2000
19	Nikollaq Mata	2000	2003
20	Fadil Nasufi	2003	2015
21	Petrit Sinaj	2015	2019
22	Ervin Demo	2019	incumbent

== See also ==
- Politics of Albania
