= Berat =

Ninth largest city of Albania

Berat Berati
- Municipality
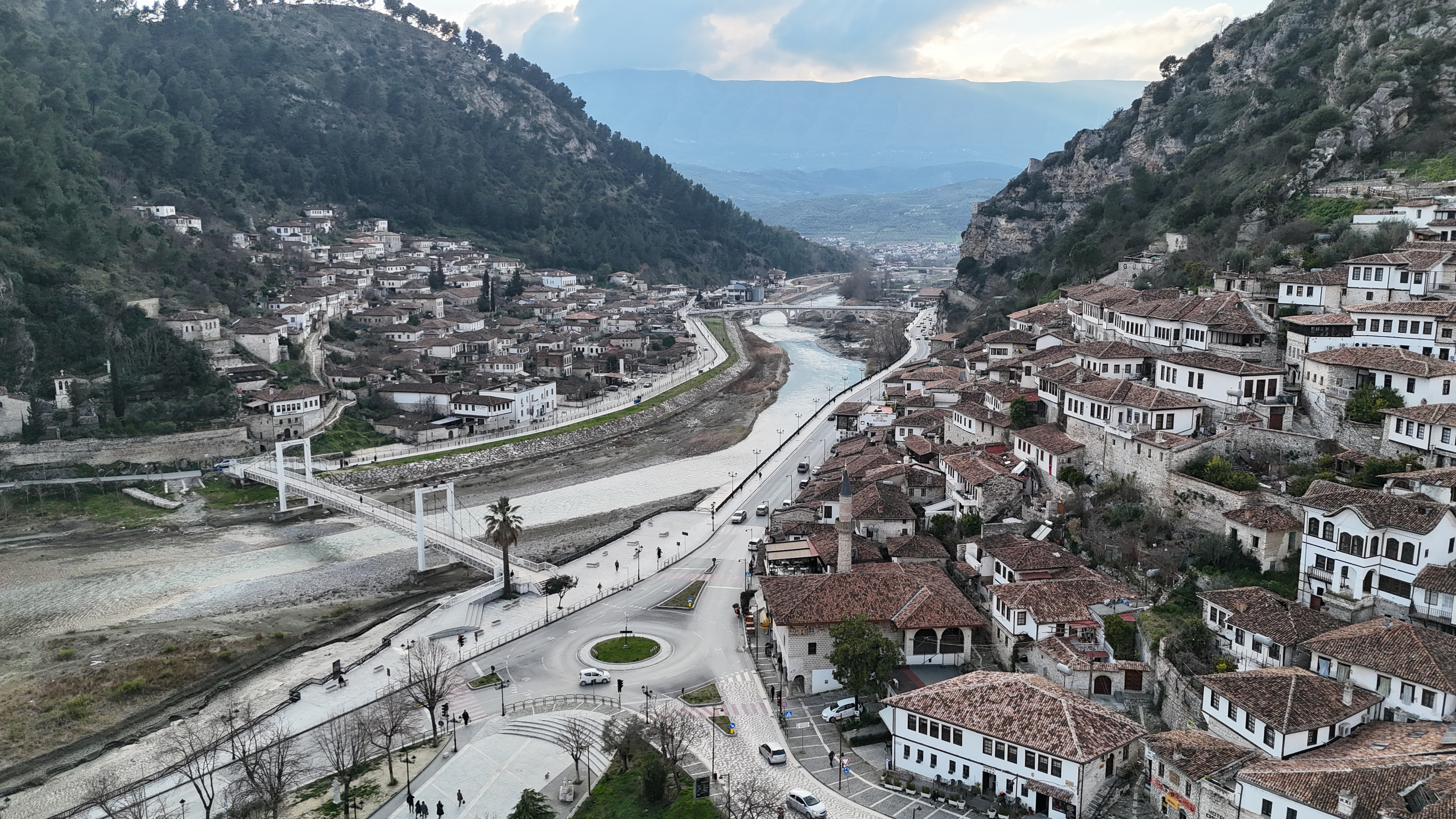
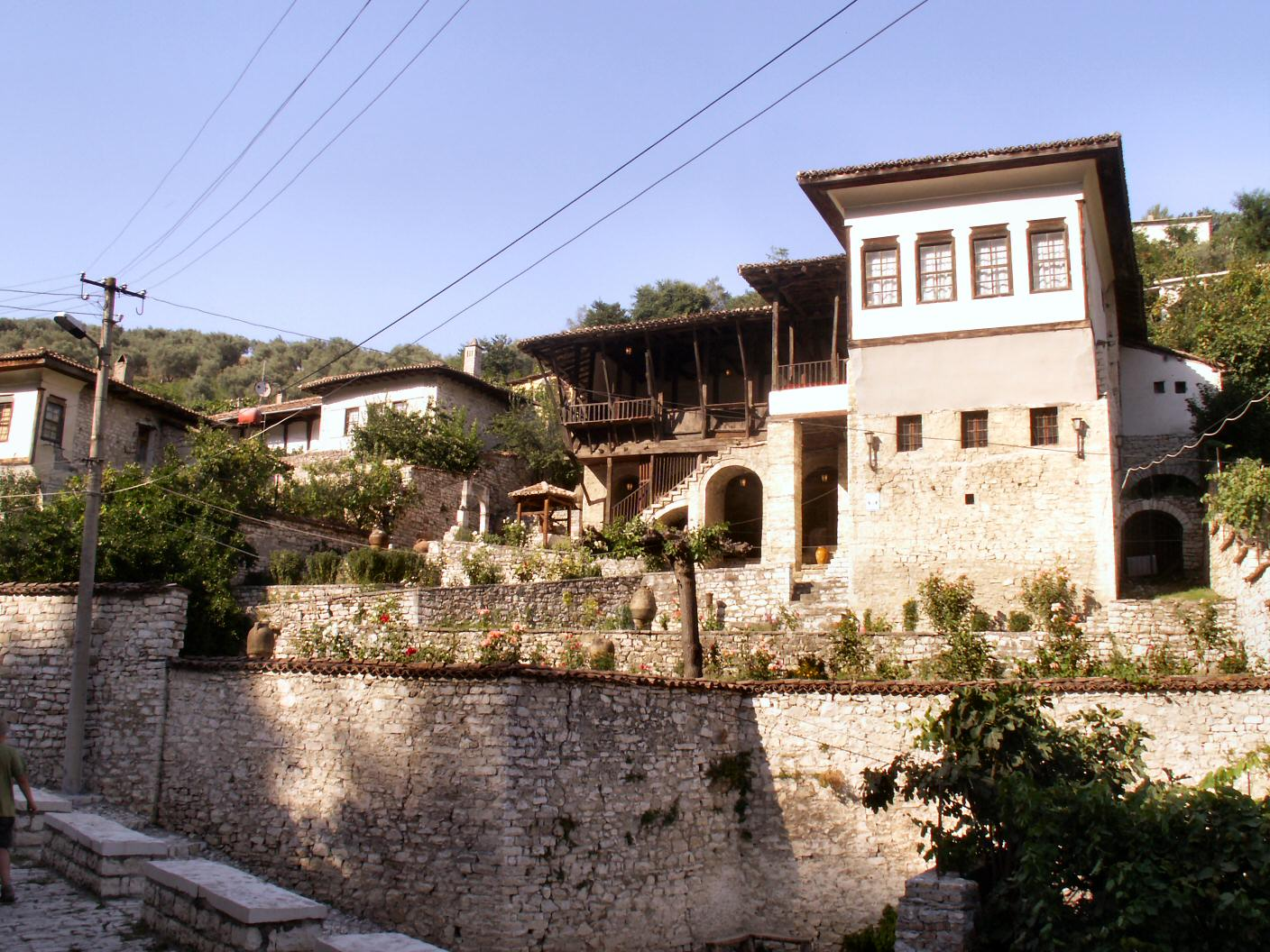
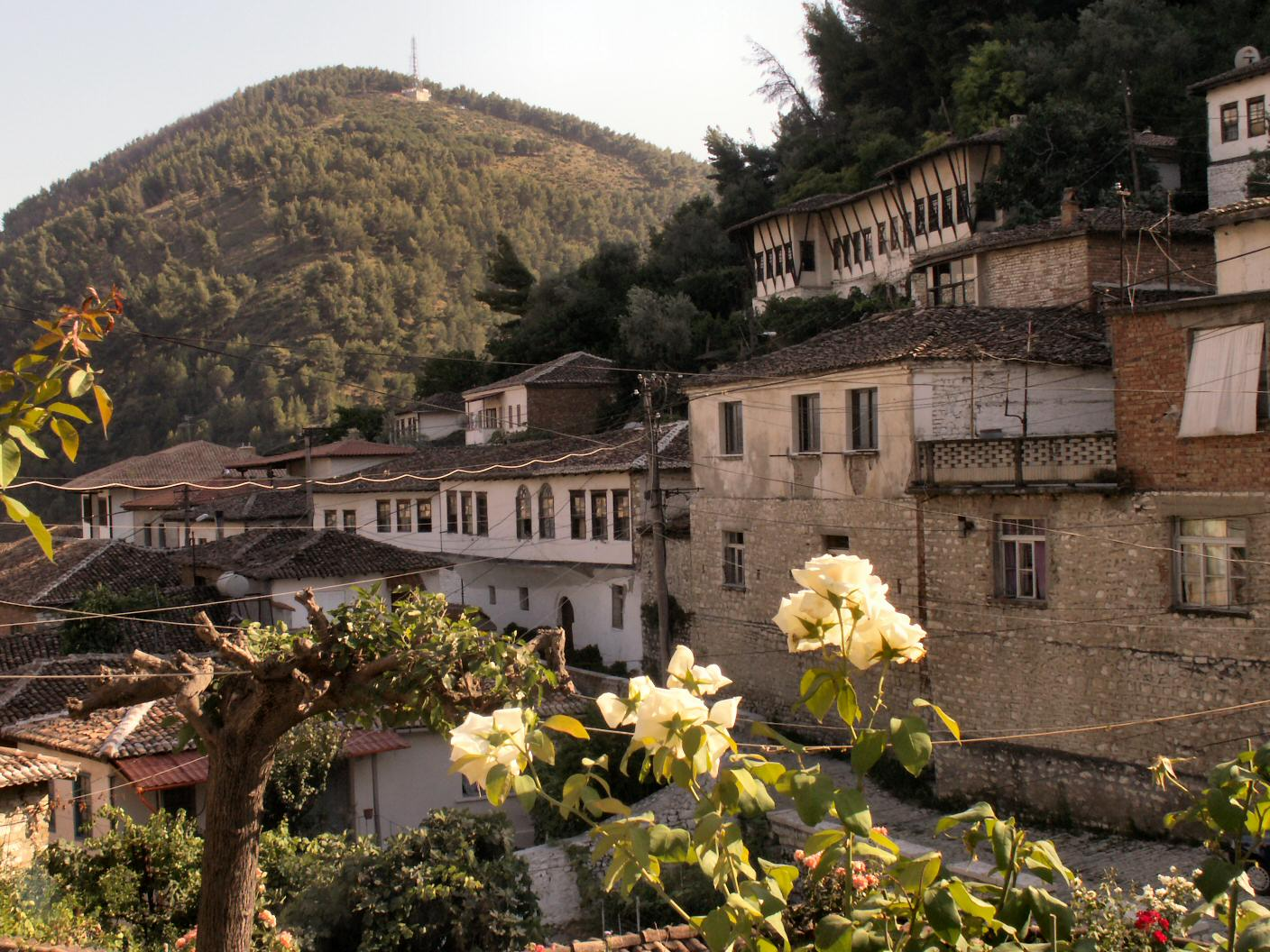
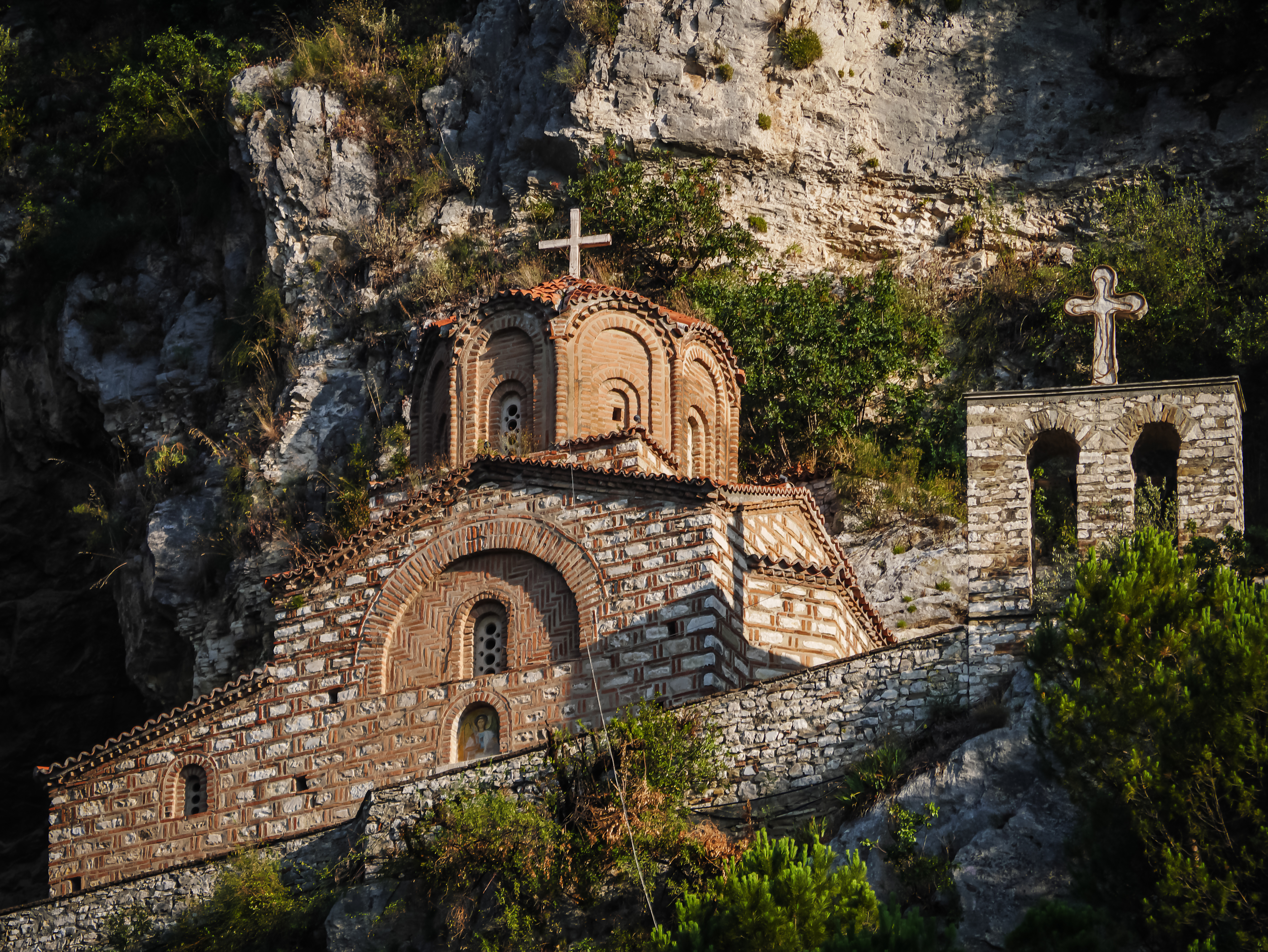
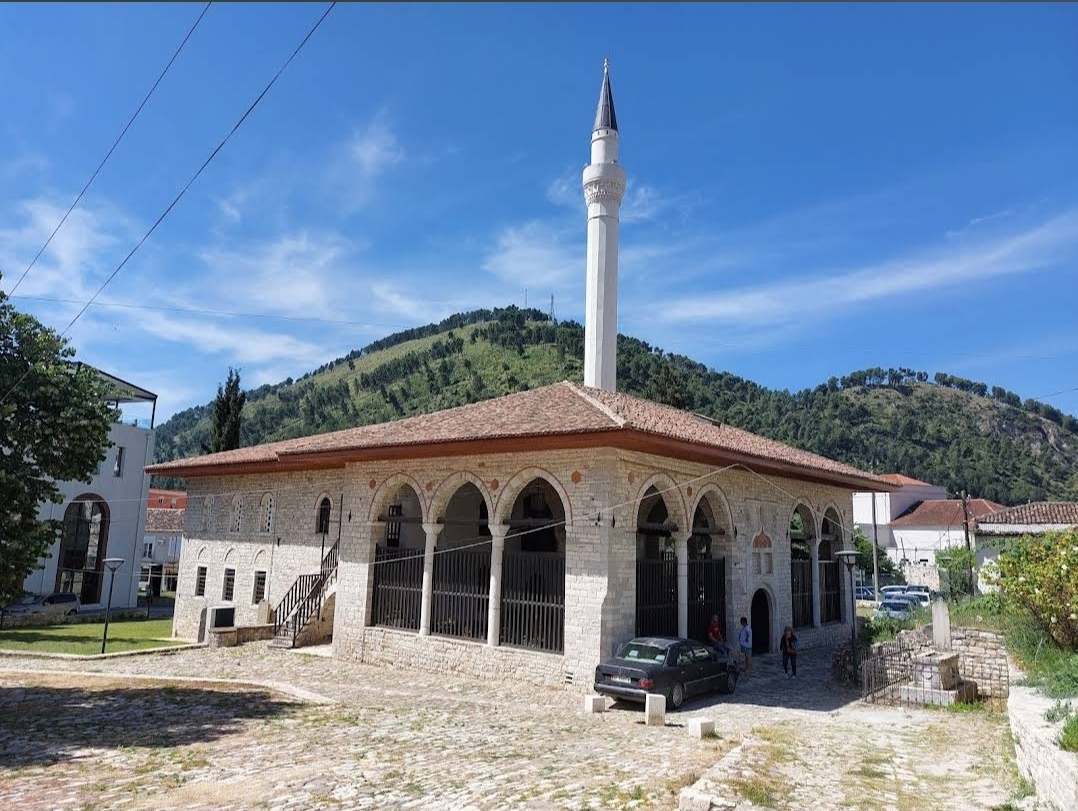
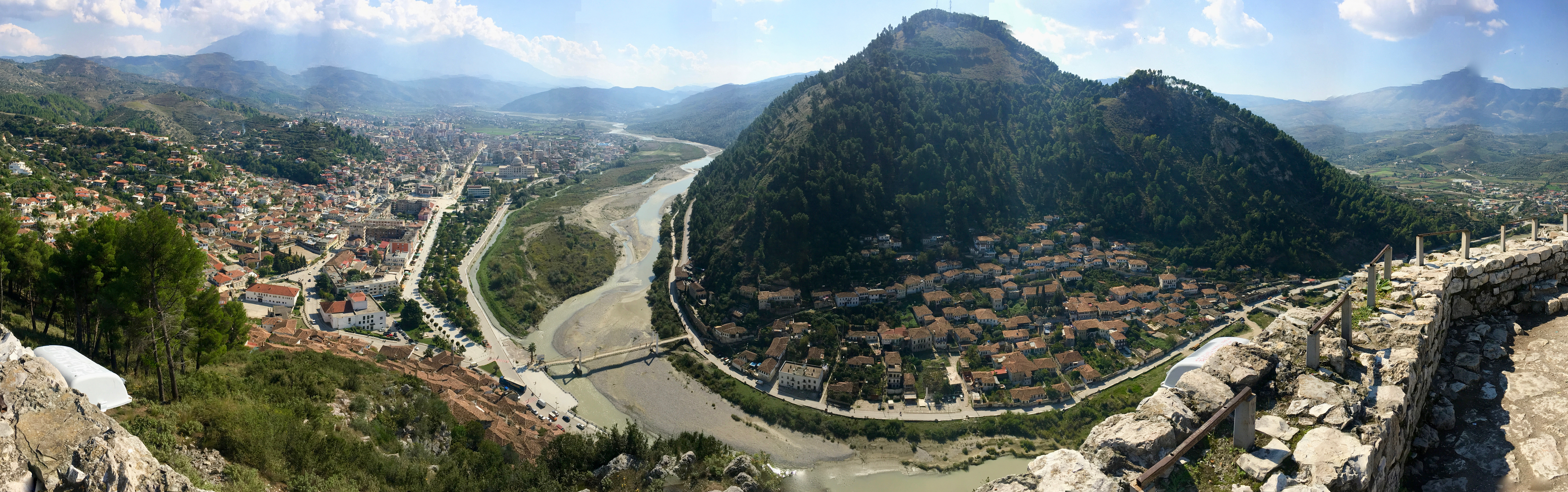
- Photomontage of Berat

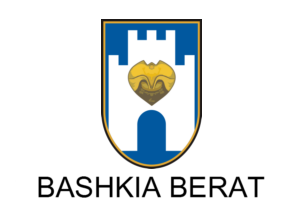
- Flag Emblem

- Location within Albania
- Coordinates: 40°42′08″N 19°57′30″E
- Country: Albania
- County: Berat

Government
  - Mayor: Ervin Ceca (PS)

Area
  - Municipality: 380 km^{2} (150 sq mi)
  - Administrative unit: 19 km^{2} (7.3 sq mi)
- Elevation: 80 m (260 ft)

Population (2023)
  - Municipality: 62,232
  - Municipality density: 160/km^{2} (420/sq mi)
  - Administrative unit: 40,665
  - Administrative unit density: 2,100/km^{2} (5,500/sq mi)
- Demonym(s): Albanian: Beratas (m), Beratase (f)
- Time zone: UTC+1 (CET)
  - Summer (DST): UTC+2 (CEST)
- Postal Code: 5001-5022
- Area Code: (0)11
- Website: bashkiaberat.gov.al

UNESCO World Heritage Site
- Official name: Historic Centres of Berat and Gjirokastra
- Type: Cultural
- Criteria: iii, iv
- Designated: 2005
- Reference no.: 569
- Region: Berat County
- Europe: 2005–present

Berat (pronounced [bɛˈɻat]; Albanian definite form: Berati) is the ninth most populous city of Albania and the seat of Berat County and Berat Municipality. By air, it is 71 kilometres (44 miles) north of Gjirokastër, 70 kilometres (43 miles) west of Korçë, 70 kilometres (43 miles) south of Tirana, and 33 kilometres (21 miles) east of Fier.

Berat is located in the south of the country. It is surrounded by mountains and hills, including Tomorr on the east that was declared a national park. The river Osum (total length 161 km (100 mi)) runs through the city before it empties into the Seman within the Myzeqe Plain. The municipality of Berat was formed at the 2015 local government reform by the merger of the former municipalities Berat, Otllak, Roshnik, Sinjë, and Velabisht, that became municipal units. The seat of the municipality is the city Berat. The total population is 62,232 as of the 2023 census, (Note: The municipality of Berat consists of the administrative units of Otllak, Roshnik, Sinjë, Velabisht and Berat. The population of the municipality results from the sum of the listed administrative units in the former as of the 2011 Albanian census.) in a total area of 421.6 km^{2} (162.8 sq mi). (Note: Calculated using geospatial data.)

Historical population
Year	Pop.	±%
1950	11,648	—
1960	18,685	+60.4%
1969	24,700	+32.2%
1979	33,400	+35.2%
1989	46,210	+38.4%
2001	44,040	−4.7%
2011	36,496	−17.1%
2023	40,665	+11.4%

Berat, designated a UNESCO World Heritage Site in 2008, comprises a unique style of architecture with influences from several civilizations that have managed to coexist for centuries throughout the history. Like many cities in Albania, Berat comprises an old fortified city filled with churches and mosques painted with grandiose wealth of visible murals and frescos. Berat is one of the main cultural centres of the country.

== Etymology ==
The name Berat has been derived through Albanian sound changes from the Old Slavonic language Bělgrad (Бѣлградъ) or Belgrád / Beligrad (Белград / Белиград), meaning "White City".

It is believed to have been the site of the ancient city Antipatreia (Ancient Greek: Ἀντιπάτρεια, "City of Antipater") or Antipatrea in Latin, while during the early Byzantine Empire the name of the town was Pulcheriopolis (Byzantine Greek: Πουλχεριόπολις, "City of Pulcheria"). It was recorded in Medieval Latin as Belogradum, Bellegradum, in Turkish as Belgrad and in Italian as Belgrado. In the Republic of Venice the city was known as Belgrado di Romania ("Rumelian Belgrade"), while in the Ottoman Empire it was also known as Belgrad-i Arnavud ("Albanian Belgrade") to distinguish it from Belgrade in Serbia.

Today, in Aromanian, Berat is known as Birat.

== History ==
=== Early development ===
Ceramic finds from the 7th century BCE initially attest to a settlement of the rocky hill of Berat by the Illyrians. Berat has been identified with ancient Antipatrea. Probably since the mid-4th century BCE the Illyrians went through a dynamic development, founding their own cities like Dimale and Byllis; however it is uncertain whether this development among Illyrians involved also Berat, or whether the foundation of the city is to be attributed to Cassander of Macedon. The founding date is unknown, although if Cassander is the founder, it would date back after he took control of southern Illyria around 314 BCE.

Antipatrea was involved in the Illyrian Wars and Macedonian Wars, and it is mentioned as a city of Dassaretia in southern Illyria. Along with Chrysondyon, Gertous and Creonion, Antipatrea was one of the Dassaretan towns around which the Illyrian dynast Skerdilaidas and the Macedonian king Philip V fought in 217 BCE. The city eventually was conquered by Philip V until Roman intervention. Antipatrea was described as the largest settlement with significant walls and referred to as the only urbs in the area, in contrast with other settlements that were described as castella or oppida. As reported by Roman historian Livy, in 200 BCE the Roman legatus Lucius Apustius "stormed and subdued Antipatrea by force of arms and, after killing the men of military age and granting all the plunder to the soldiers, he demolished the walls and burned the city". In Roman times it was included within Epirus Nova, in the province of Macedonia. The town became part of the unstable frontier of the Byzantine Empire following the fall of the western Roman Empire and, along with much of the rest of the Balkan Peninsula, it suffered from repeated invasions by Slavs. During the Roman and early Byzantine period, the city was known as Pulcheriopolis.

The First Bulgarian Empire under Presian I captured the town in the 9th century, and the city received the Slavic name Bel[i]grad ("White City"), which persisted throughout the medieval period, changing to Berat under Ottoman rule. The town became one of the most important towns in the Bulgarian region Kutmichevitsa. The Bulgarian governor Elemag surrendered the city to the emperor Basil II in 1018, and the city remained in Byzantine hands until the Second Bulgarian Empire retook the city in 1203 during the rule of Kaloyan. During the 13th century, it fell to Michael I Ducas, the ruler of the Despotate of Epirus.

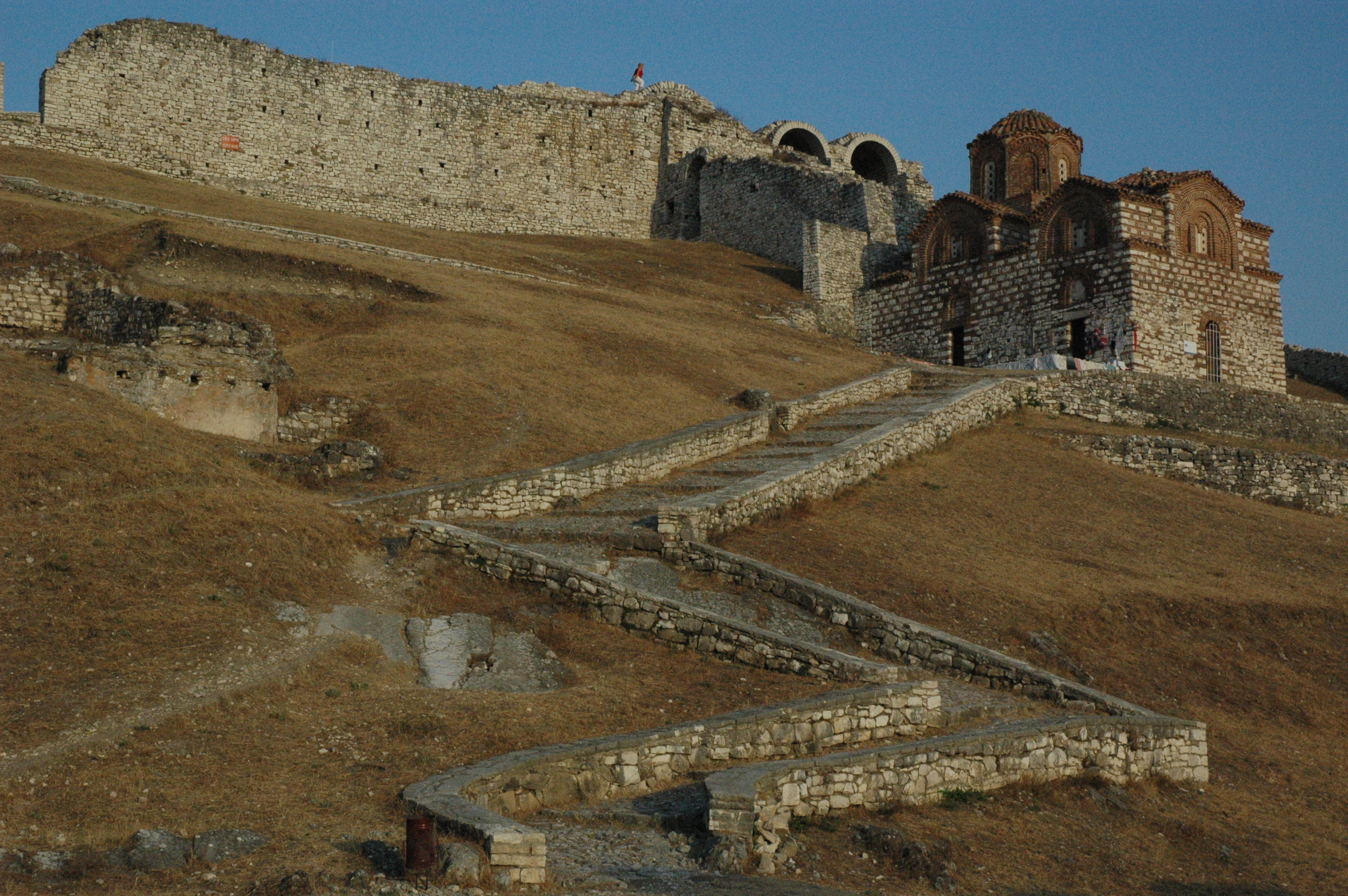
The entrance of the citadel, with the 13th century Byzantine Holy Trinity Church

Byzantine Emperor Michael VIII Palaiologos sent letters to the Albanian leaders of Berat and Durrës in 1272 asking them to abandon their alliance with Charles I of Naples, leader of the Kingdom of Albania, who had captured and incorporated it at the same period in the Kingdom of Albania. However, they passed the letters on to Charles as a sign of their loyalty. In 1274 Michael VIII recaptured Berat and after being joined by Albanians who supported the Byzantine Empire, marched unsuccessfully against the Angevin capital of Durrës. In 1280-1281 the Sicilian forces under Hugh the Red of Sully laid siege to Berat. In March 1281 a relief force from Constantinople under the command of Michael Tarchaneiotes was able to drive off the besieging Sicilian army. Later in the 13th century Berat again fell under the control of the Byzantine Empire.

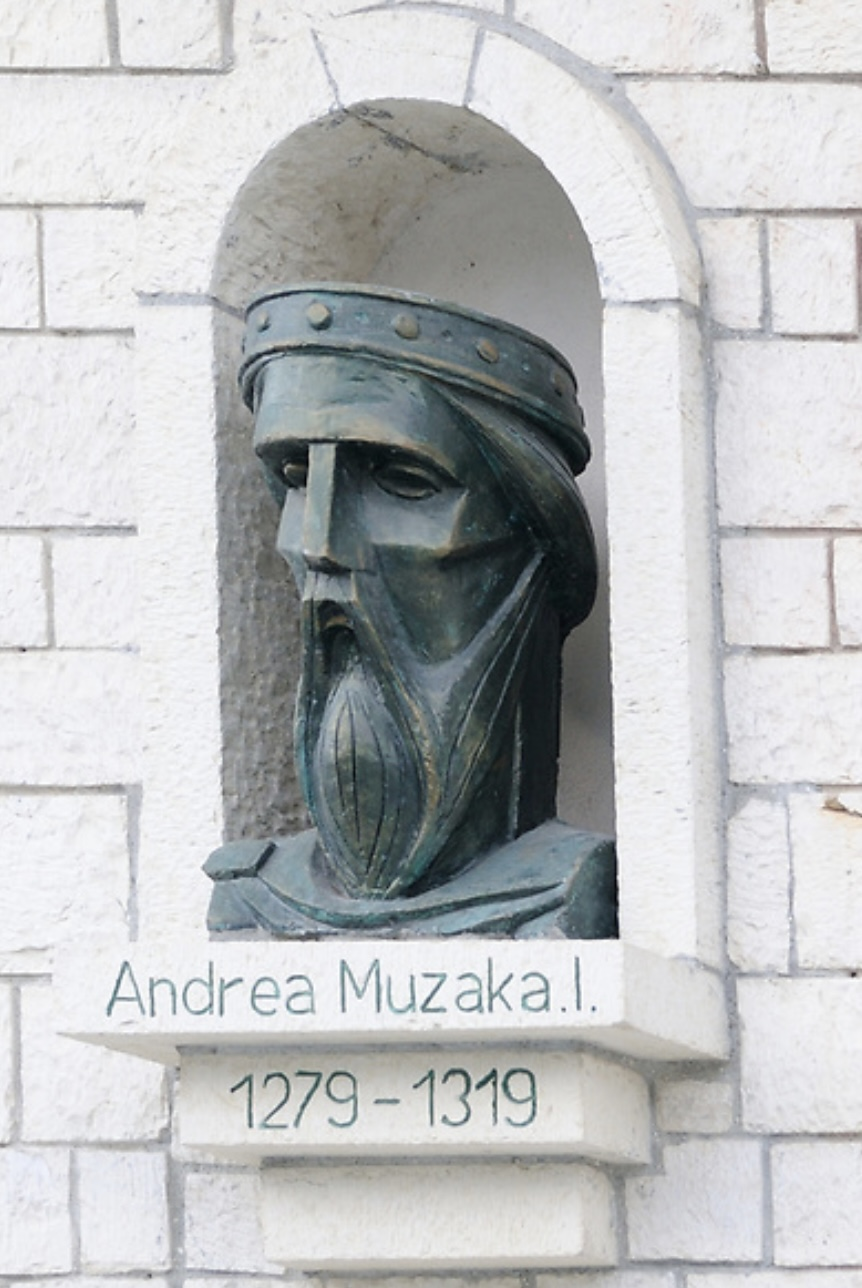
Andrea I Muzaka first ruler of the Principality of Muzaka in 1280.

The fortress of Tomorr in the early 14th century is attested as Timoro(n) under Byzantine control. In 1337, the Albanian tribes which lived in the areas of Belegrita (the region of Mt. Tomorr near Berat) and Kanina rose in rebellion, and seized the fortress of Tomorr. There is little detail about the rebellion in primary sources. John VI Kantakouzenos mentions that the Albanians in those areas rebelled despite the privileges which Andronikos III Palaiologos had given them a few years earlier. Andronikos led an army mainly composed of Turkish mercenaries, and defeated the Albanians, killing many and taking prisoners. In 1345 (or maybe 1343) the town passed to the Serbian Empire. After its dissolution in 1355 Berat came under suzerainty of its former governor, John Komnenos Asen (1345–1363), Alexander Komnenos Asen (1363–1372) and Zeta of Balsha II (1372–1385). In 1385 Berat was captured by the Ottomans, before the Battle of Savra. According to some sources, the Ottomans probably remained in Berat for some time with intention to use it as foothold to capture Valona. By 1396, the Albanian Muzaka family took over control of Berat, which became the capital of the Principality of Berat. In 1417 Berat became a part of the Ottoman Empire. In 1455 Skanderbeg, a commander with an Albanian force of 14,000 and small number of Catalan soldiers unsuccessfully tried to capture Berat from an Ottoman force of 40,000.

=== Modern period ===
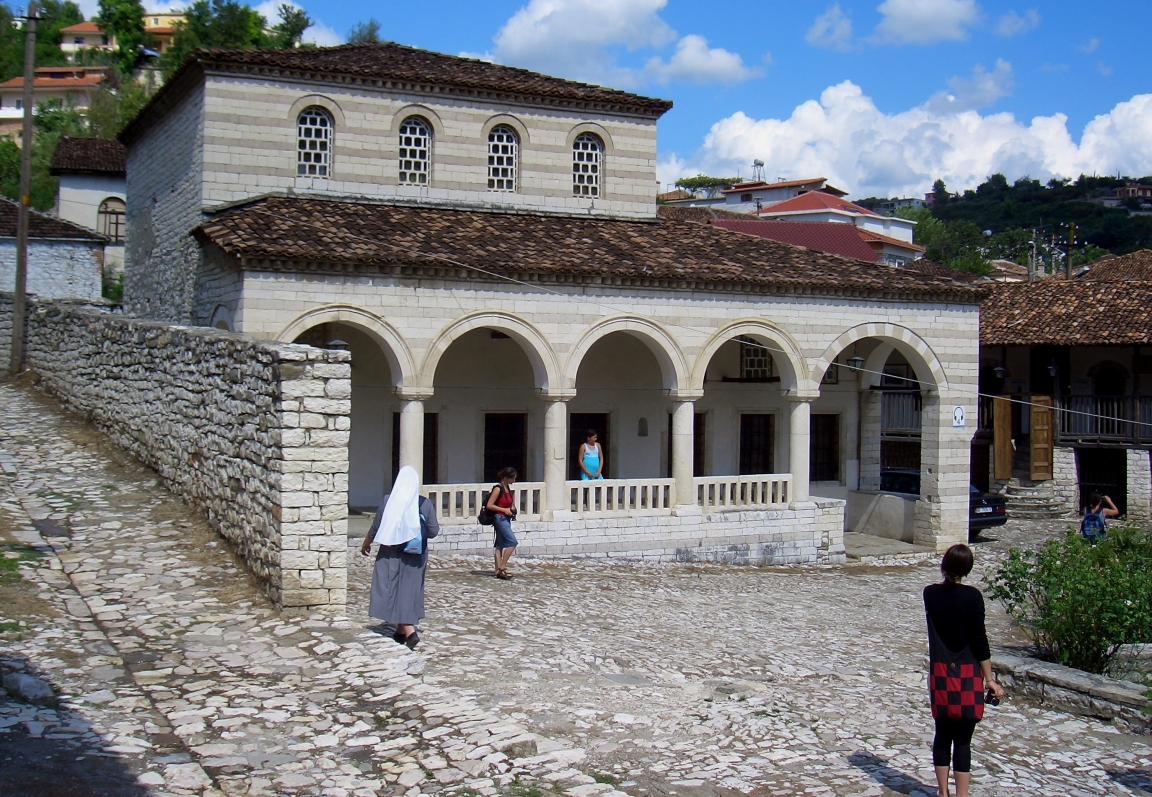
Halveti Tekke

During the early period of Ottoman rule, Berat fell into severe decline. By the end of the 16th century it had only 710 houses. However, it began to recover by the 17th century, and became a major craft centre specializing in wood carving.

During the first part of the sixteenth century, Berat was a Christian city and did not contain any Muslim households. The urban population of this period (1506–1583) increased little, with the addition of 17 houses. Following their expulsion and arrival from Spain, a Jewish community existed in Berat that consisted of 25 families between 1519 and 1520.

Toward the latter part of the sixteenth century, Berat contained 461 Muslim houses and another 187 belonged to newcomers from the surrounding villages of Gjeqar, Gjerbës, Tozhar, Fratar, and Dobronik. Conversion to Islam of the local urban population in Berat had increased during this time and part of the newcomer population were also Muslim converts who had Islamic names and Christian surnames. Factors such as tax exemptions for Muslim urban craftsmen in exchange for military service drove many of the incoming rural first generation Muslim population to Berat. Followers of Sabbatai Zevi existed in Berat among Jews during the mid-seventeenth century. The Berat Jewish community took an active role in the welfare of other Jews, such as managing to attain the release of war-related captives present in Durrës in 1596.

By the early seventeenth century, urban life in Berat started to resemble Ottoman and Muslim patterns. From 1670 onward, Berat became a Muslim-majority city and of its 30 neighbourhoods, 19 were populated by Muslims. Factors attributed to the change of the urban religious composition in Berat was pressure to covert in some neighbourhoods, and a lack of Christian priests able to provide religious services.

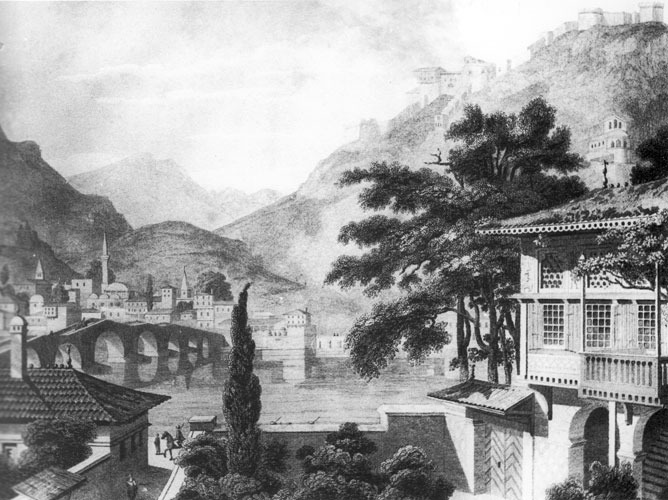
The city of Berat in 1813, illustration by Charles Robert Cockerell (1788–1863).

In the 18th century, Berat was one of the most important Albanian cities during the Ottoman period.

In the early modern era the city was the capital of the Pashalik of Berat founded by Ahmet Kurt Pasha. Berat was incorporated in the Pashalik of Yanina after Ibrahim Pasha of Berat was defeated by Ali Pasha in 1809. In 1867, Berat became a sanjak in Janina vilayet. Berat replaced a declining Vlorë as the centre of the sanjak (province) in the nineteenth century. The sanjak of Berat and the city itself were under the dominance of the Albanian Vrioni family. The Jewish community of Yanina renewed the Jewish community of Berat in the nineteenth century.

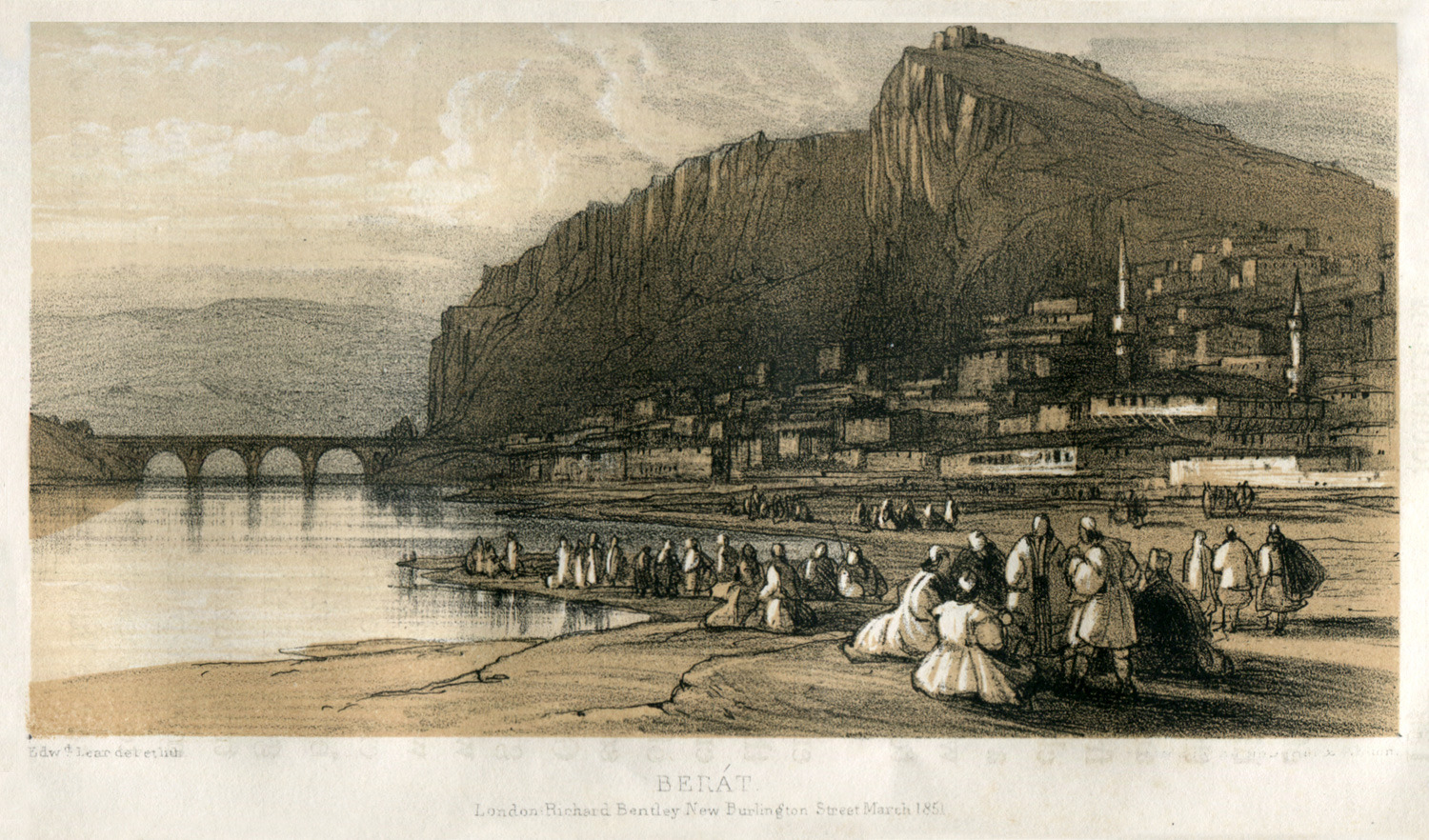
Berat depicted by Edward Lear, 15 October 1848.

In the late Ottoman period, the population of Berat was 10–15,000 inhabitants, with Orthodox Christians numbering some 5,000 people of whom 3,000 spoke the Aromanian language and the rest the Albanian language.

During the 19th century, Berat played an important part in the Albanian national revival. Christian merchants in Berat supported the Albanian movement. The Albanian revolts of 1833–1839 greatly impacted the city, especially with revolts that occurred in October 1833. The city's castle was surrounded by 10,000 people. Berat's mütesellim, Emin Aga, was forced to leave the city in the hands of the revolt's leaders. On October 22, 1833, the revolt's leaders drafted their requests to the Sublime Porte: they would no longer allow that Berat give soldiers to the Ottoman government. They also demanded that Albania's local administration be led by Albanian people. The Ottoman government accepted the rebels' requests and nominated some Albanian officials in the city and declared an amnesty as well. In August 1839 a new uprising took place in Berat. The inhabitants attacked the Ottoman forces and besieged them in the castle. Meanwhile, the rebellion spread out to the regions of Sanjak of Vlorë. The rebels leaders sent a petition to Sultan Abdulmejid I to have Albanian officials in administration and to put Ismail Pasha, the nephew of Ali Pasha as a general governor. In September 1839 the rebels captured the castle, however once again the Ottoman government postponed the application of reforms in Albania.

Berat became a major base of support for the League of Prizren, the late 19th century Albanian nationalist alliance, while the city was also represented in the formation of southern branch of the league in Gjirokastër. In the First World War, a census by Austro-Hungarian occupation forces counted 6745 Orthodox Christians and 20,919 Muslims in the Berat region.

==== 20th and 21st century ====
During the Second World War, Jews were concealed in the homes and basements of 60 families from the Muslim and Christian communities in Berat. Albanian Muslims in the city let Jewish people worship in the local mosque, and a Star of David can still be seen on the walls of the city's main Islamic place of worship.

From 23 to 30 October 1944, the second session of the Council of National Liberation of Albania was held in Berat, where the National Liberation Movement-controlled Anti-Fascist National Liberation Committee became the Provisional Democratic Government of Albania, with Enver Hoxha as its prime minister and minister of defence.

During the Communist era, Berat became a place of internal exile for those who were deemed public enemies, and their families. Starting in the 1950s, the village served as a political internment center from which the internees could not leave without permission. Each day, internees were required to sign up at the Security Office or the police. In 1963, a Deportation-Internment Commission report indicated that there were 30 interned in Berat, which consisted in part of internees those interned due to risk of escape. The rest are convicted for ordinary causes. In 1967, Albanian author Ismail Kadare was sent to Berat, where he spent two years. Relatives of those who had fled abroad, or sympathized with Titoist Yugoslavia were also deported to Berat.

In the modern period, a Romani community numbering 200-300 lives in Berat and its outskirts whereas others in a few nearby villages, at times living in difficult economic circumstances with some seasonally migrating to Greece for work. Some Aromanian-speakers and Greek-speakers can be found in the town and nearby villages.

== Geography ==
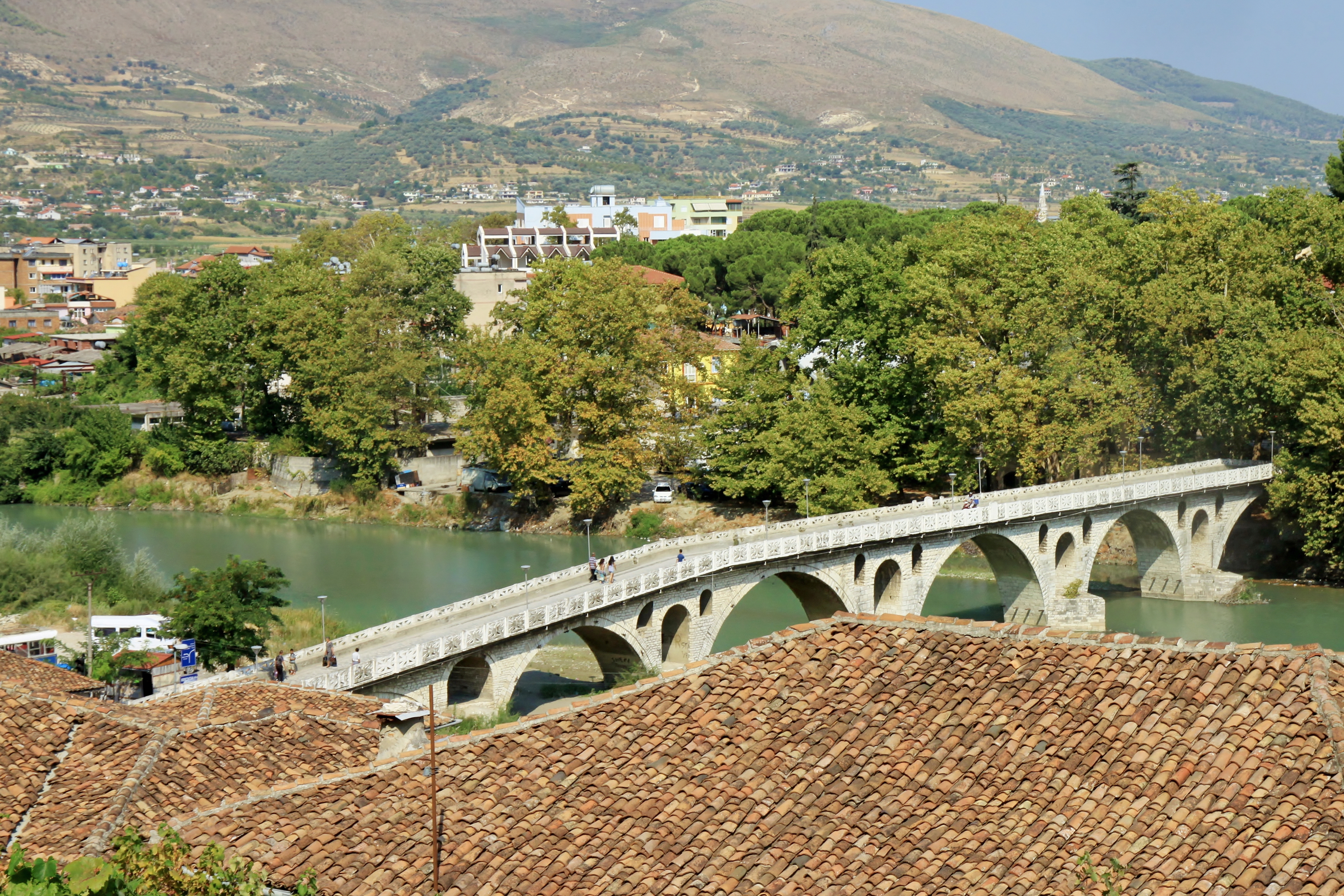
Berat

Berat lies on the right bank of the river Osum, a short distance from the point where it is joined by the Molisht river. The old city centre consists of three parts: Kalaja (on the castle hill), Mangalem (at the foot of the castle hill) and Gorica (on the left bank of the Osum). It has a number of buildings of architectural and historical interest. The pine forests above the city, on the slopes of the towering Tomorr mountains, provide a backdrop of appropriate grandeur. The Osumi river has cut a 915-metre deep gorge through the limestone rock on the west side of the valley to form a precipitous natural fortress, around which the town was built on several river terraces.

According to an Albanian legend, the Tomorr mountain was originally a giant, who fought with another giant (mountain) called Shpirag over a young woman. They killed each other and the girl drowned in her tears, which then became the Osum river.

Mount Shpirag, named after the second giant, is on the left bank of the gorge, above the district of Gorica. Berat is known to Albanians as the city of "One above another Windows" (a similar epithet is sometimes applied to Gjirokastra), or The City of Two Thousand Steps. It was proclaimed a 'Museum City' by the dictator Enver Hoxha in June 1961.

=== Climate ===
Berat has a Mediterranean climate (Csa) under the Köppen climate classification. Summers are characterised as hot and dry with a maximum average of 28.2 °C (82.8 °F) in July. Conversely, winter brings mild and wet weather with an average of 7.2 °C (45.0 °F) in January. The lowest minimum temperature recorded in Berat was estimated at −12.2 °C (10.0 °F) and its highest maximum temperature at 47.1 °C (116.8 °F).

Climate data for Berat (1991 - 2010)
Month	Jan	Feb	Mar	Apr	May	Jun	Jul	Aug	Sep	Oct	Nov	Dec	Year
Record high °C (°F)	25 (77)	27 (81)	29 (84)	34 (93)	38 (100)	43 (109)	44 (111)	43 (109)	42 (108)	35 (95)	30 (86)	28 (82)	44 (111)
Mean daily maximum °C (°F)	8 (46)	11 (52)	17.1 (62.8)	22 (72)	25.3 (77.5)	30.4 (86.7)	33.4 (92.1)	33.6 (92.5)	29.2 (84.6)	24 (75)	20 (68)	13 (55)	22.3 (72.0)
Mean daily minimum °C (°F)	2.0 (35.6)	2.1 (35.8)	4.2 (39.6)	10 (50)	13 (55)	17.8 (64.0)	20.3 (68.5)	20.0 (68.0)	17.0 (62.6)	12.5 (54.5)	9.3 (48.7)	3.5 (38.3)	11.0 (51.7)
Record low °C (°F)	−12 (10)	−12.2 (10.0)	−4 (25)	−1 (30)	3 (37)	8 (46)	14 (57)	12 (54)	6 (43)	0 (32)	−3 (27)	−8 (18)	−12.2 (10.0)
Average precipitation mm (inches)	145 (5.7)	152 (6.0)	108 (4.3)	97 (3.8)	65 (2.6)	20 (0.8)	4 (0.2)	5 (0.2)	30 (1.2)	80 (3.1)	190 (7.5)	198 (7.8)	1,094 (43.2)
Source: METEOALB Weather Station

== Economy ==
By the 18th century the economy and society of Berat was closely connected to the city's craft guilds partly related to various tax exemptions that existed since the late Middle Ages. By 1750 there were twenty-two guilds, the most important of which were the tanners', the cobblers' and other leather-working guilds. Other guilds included metal-working, silver-smithing and silk-making ones.

Present-day Berat houses Albania's military industry with the nearby Kuçovë base and a disused Poliçan factory as well as a developing tourist economy as of recent years thanks to its historical sites.

== Culture ==
=== Landmarks ===
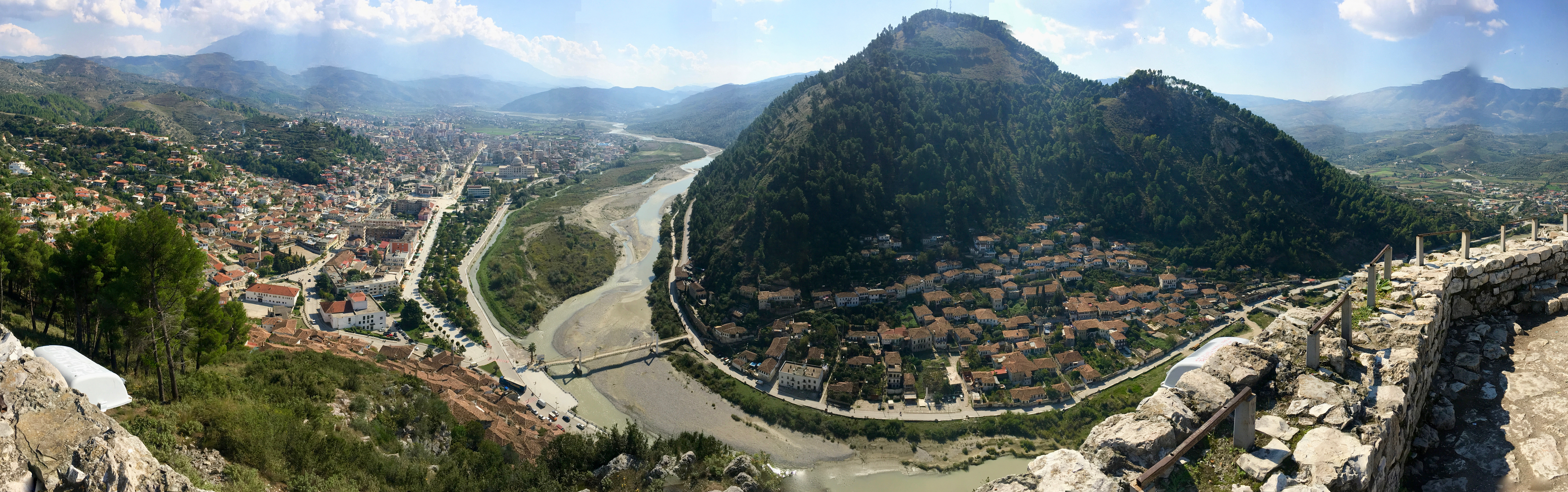
Panorama of Gorica
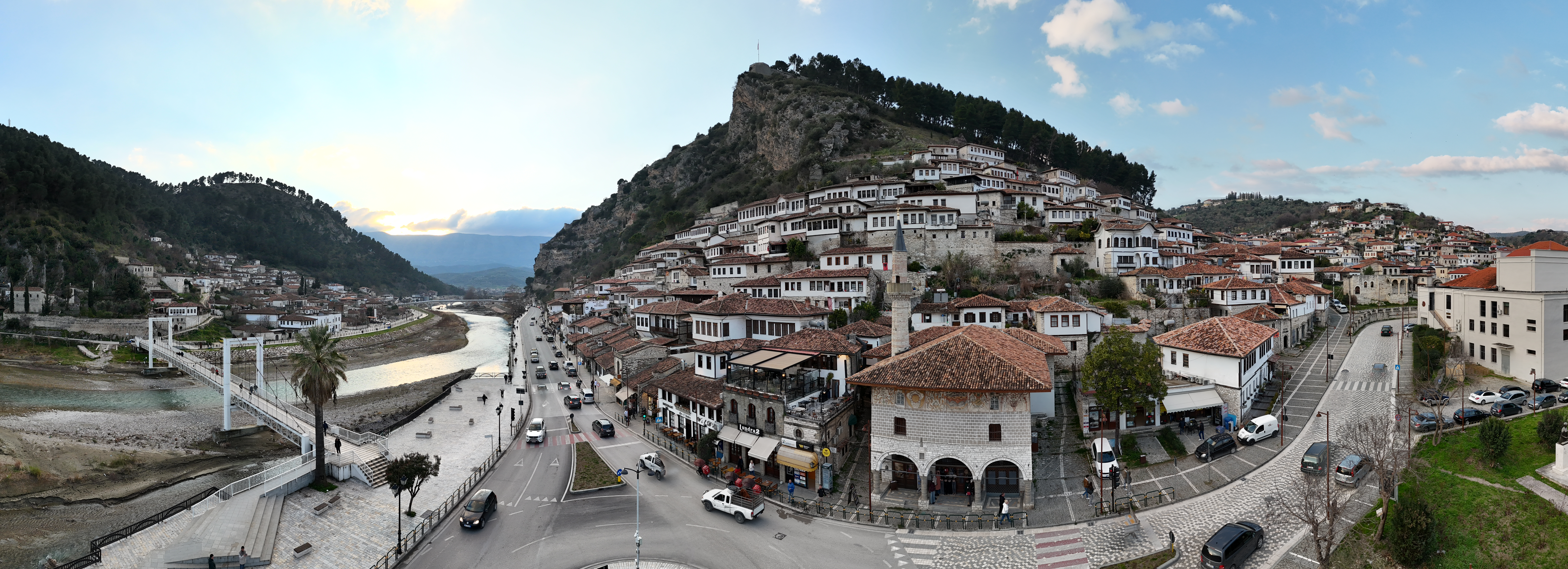
Panorama of Mangalem

The coexistence of religious and cultural communities over several centuries, beginning in the 4th century BC into the 18th century is apparent in Berat. The town also bears testimony to the architectural excellence of traditional Balkan housing construction, which date to the late 18th and the 19th centuries. Some of the landmarks of that historical period could be seen in the Berat Castle, churches of the Byzantine era such as the Church of St. Mary of Blaherna (13th century), the Bachelors' Mosque, the National Ethnographic Museum, the Sultan's Mosque (built between 1481 and 1512), Leaden Mosque (built in 1555) and the Gorica Bridge.

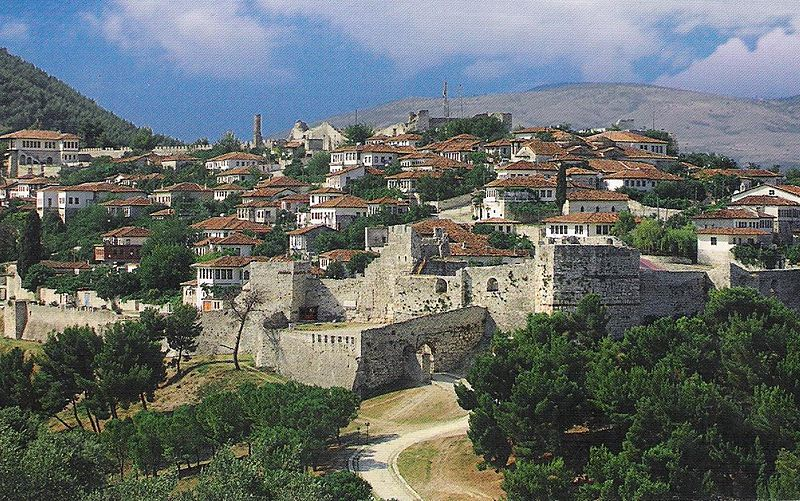
View of the Citadel of Berat

Berat Castle is built on a rocky hill on the right bank of the river Osum and is accessible only from the south. After being burned down by the Romans in 200 BC the walls were strengthened in the 5th century under Byzantine Emperor Theodosius II, and were rebuilt during the 6th century under the Emperor Justinian I and again in the 13th century under the Despot of Epirus, Michael Komnenos Doukas, cousin of the Byzantine Emperor. The main entrance, on the north side, is defended by a fortified courtyard and there are three smaller entrances. The surface that the fortress encompasses made it possible to house a considerable portion of the town's inhabitants. The buildings inside the fortress were built during the 13th century and because of their characteristic architecture are preserved as cultural monuments. The population of the fortress was Christian, and it had about 20 churches (most built during the 13th century) and only one mosque, for the use of the Muslim garrison, (of which there survives only a few ruins and the base of the minaret). The churches of the fortress have been damaged through the years and only some remain.

The Church of St. Mary of Blachernae dating from the 13th century, has 16th century mural paintings by Nikollë Onufri, son of the most important post-medieval Albanian painter, Onufri. In a small tree - planted square, on a hillside inside the walls of the fortress, stands the 14th century Church of the Holy Trinity. It is built in the form of a cross and has Byzantine murals. Outside the ramparts is the Church of St. Michael (Shën Mehill), built in the 13th century. This church is reached by a steep but perfectly safe path. Near the entrance, after a guardhouse, is the little Church of St. Theodore (Shen Todher), which have wall paintings by Onufri himself. The most interesting is the cathedral of St. Nicholas, which has been well restored and is now a museum dedicated to Onufri. Onufri was the greatest of the 16th century painters in Albania. Not only was he a master of the techniques of fresco and icons, but he was the first to introduce a new colour in painting, shiny red, which the French called "Onufri's Red". In addition, Onufri introduced a certain realism and a degree of individuality in facial expression.

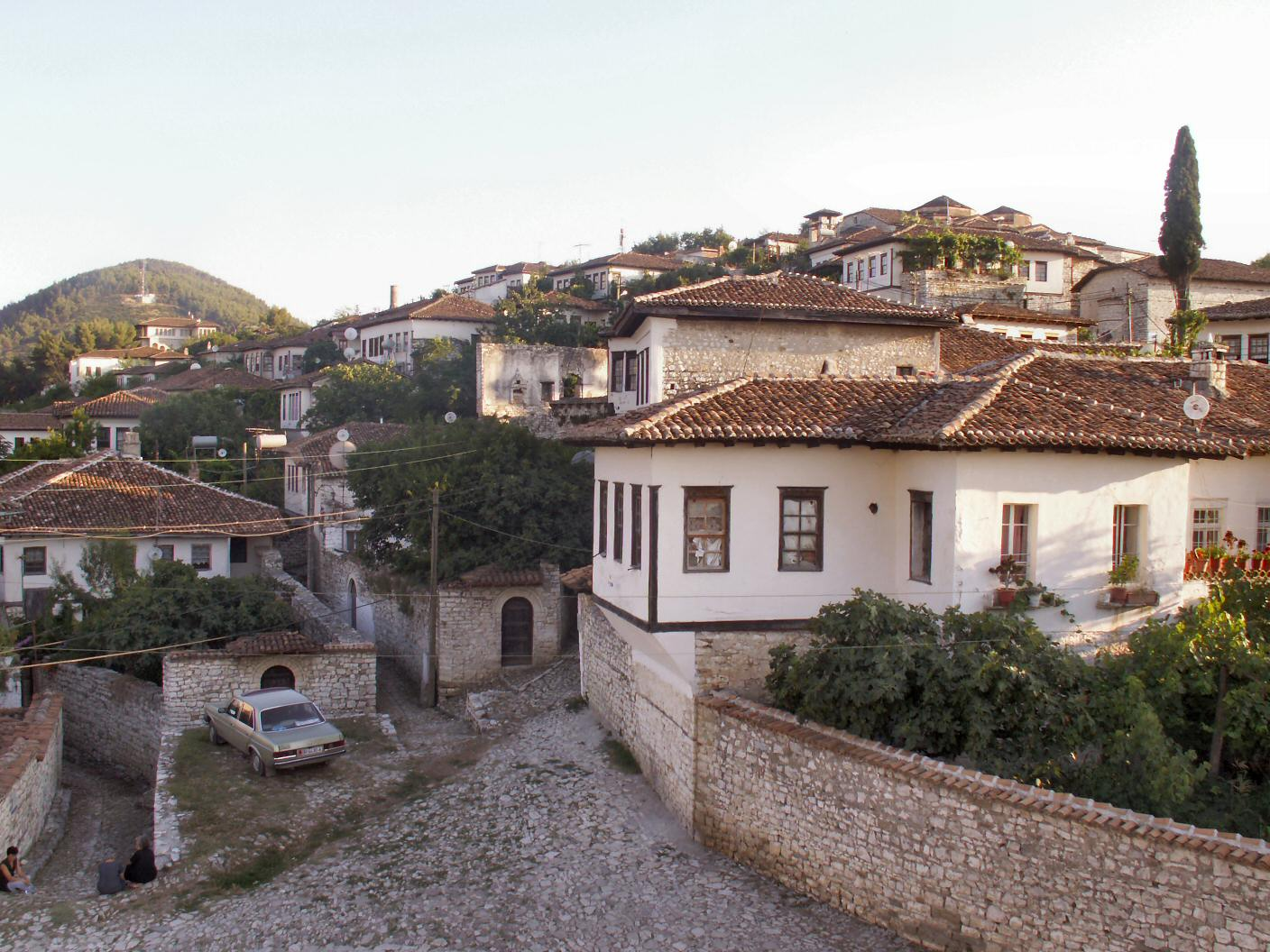
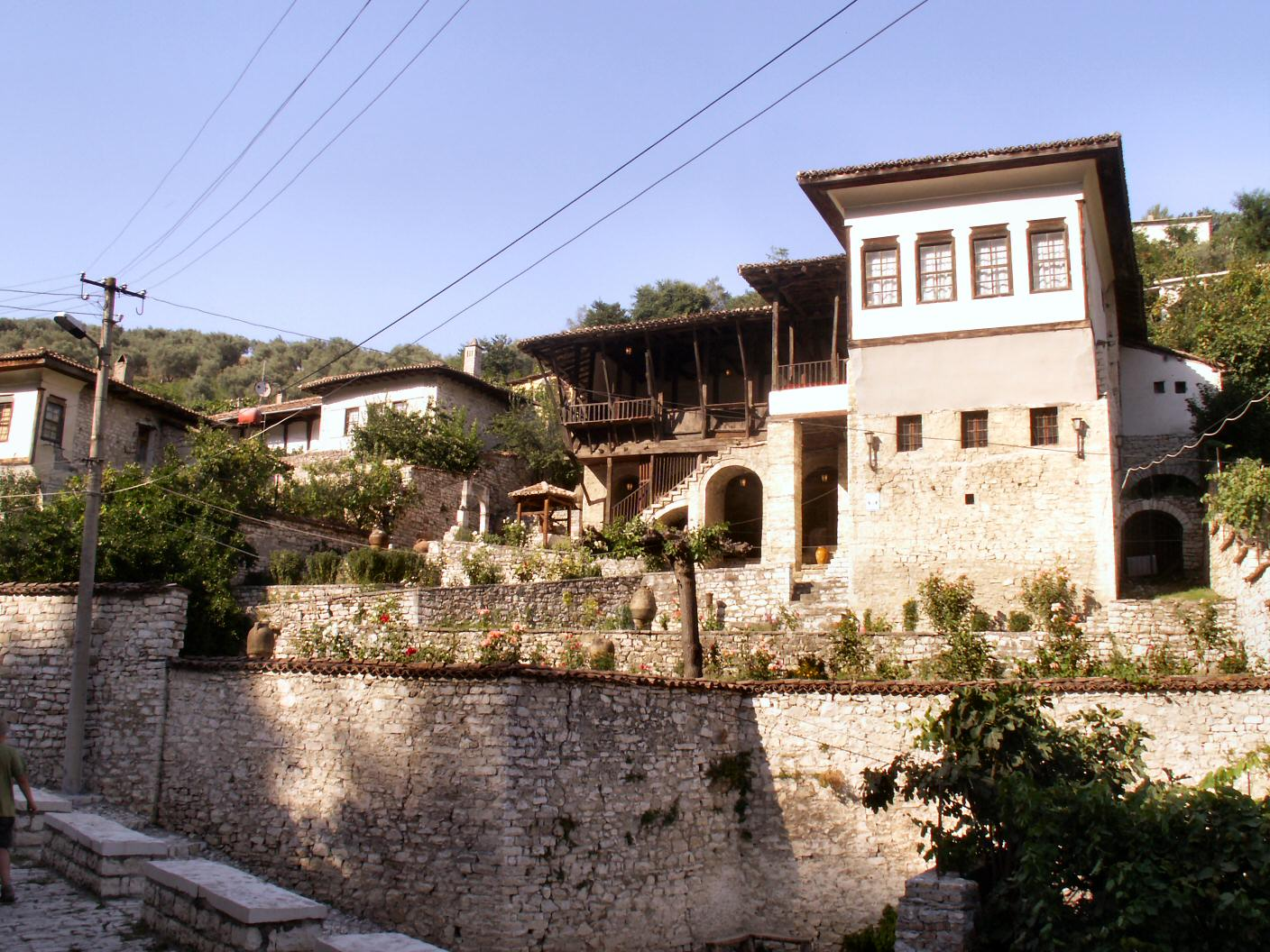
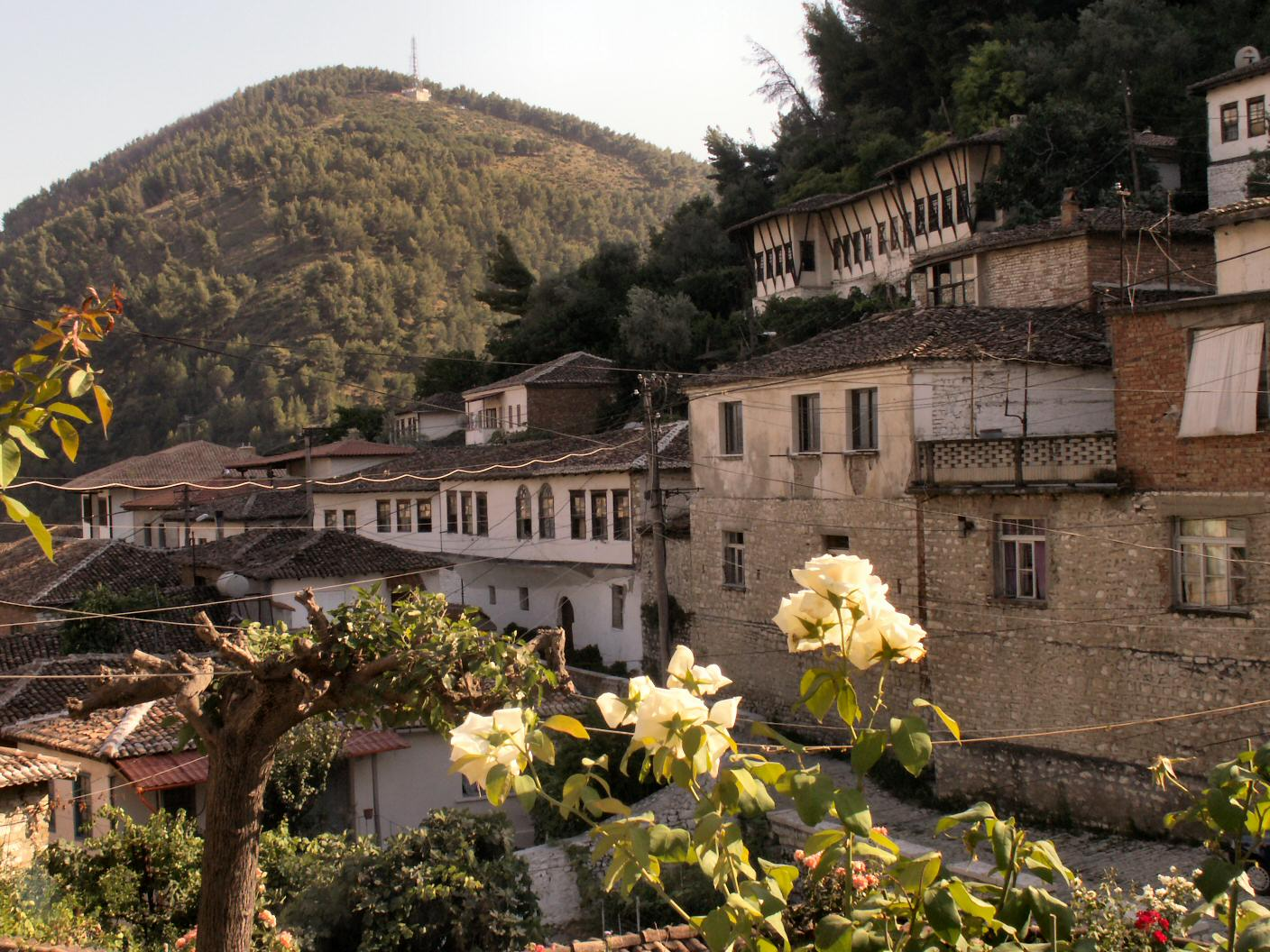
The UNESCO Site of Berat.

The first inscription recording Onufri's name was found in 1951, in the Shelqan church. The Kastoria church has a date 23 July 1547 and a reference to Onufri's origin : I am Onufri, and come from the town of Berat. Onufri's style in painting was inherited by his son, Nikolla (Nicholas), though not so successful as his father. In Onufri's museum can be found works of Onufri, his son, Nikolla and other painters'. There are also numbers of icons and some fine examples of religious silversmith's work (sacred vessels, icon casings, covers of Gospel books, etc.). Berat Gospels, which date from the 4th century, are copies (the originals are preserved in the National Archives in Tirana). The church itself has an iconostasis of carved wood, with two icons of Christ and the Virgin Mary. The bishop's throne and the pulpit are also notable. Near the street running down from the fortress is the Bachelors' Mosque (Xhami e Beqareve), built in 1827. This has a portico and external decoration of flowers, plants, and houses. The 'Bachelors' were the young shop-assistants (in practice generally unmarried), whom the merchants in Berat used as their own private militia.

The King Mosque (Albanian: Xhamia e Mbretit), the oldest in the town built in the reign of Bayazid II (1481–1512), is notable for its fine ceiling. It is museum in the modern period.

The Lead Mosque (Xhamia e Plumbit), built in 1555 and so called from the covering of its cupola. This mosque is the centre of the town.

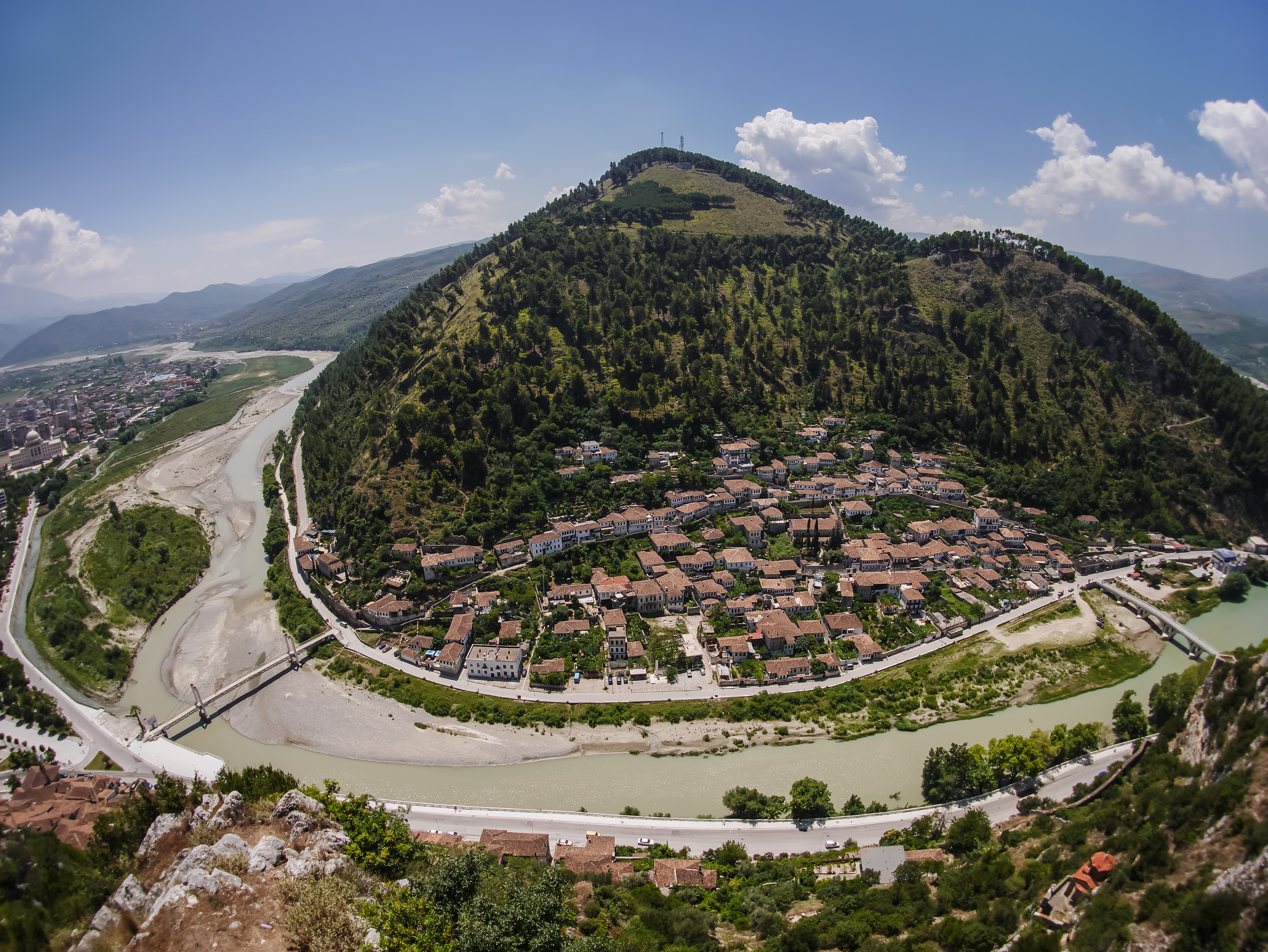
Berat as seen from the Castle.

The Halveti Tekke (Teqe e Helvetive) is thought to have been built in the 15th century. It was rebuilt by Ahmet Kurt Pasha in 1782. It belongs to the Khalwati Sufi order.

Near of tekke is purported to be the grave of Sabbatai Zevi, an Ottoman Jew who was banished to Dulcigno (present day Ulcinj), who created controversy among his followers upon his conversion to Islam.

A Jewish history museum named "Solomon Museum" is located in southern Berat, and contains exhibits about the Holocaust in Albania and the survival of Jews during the war in the country.

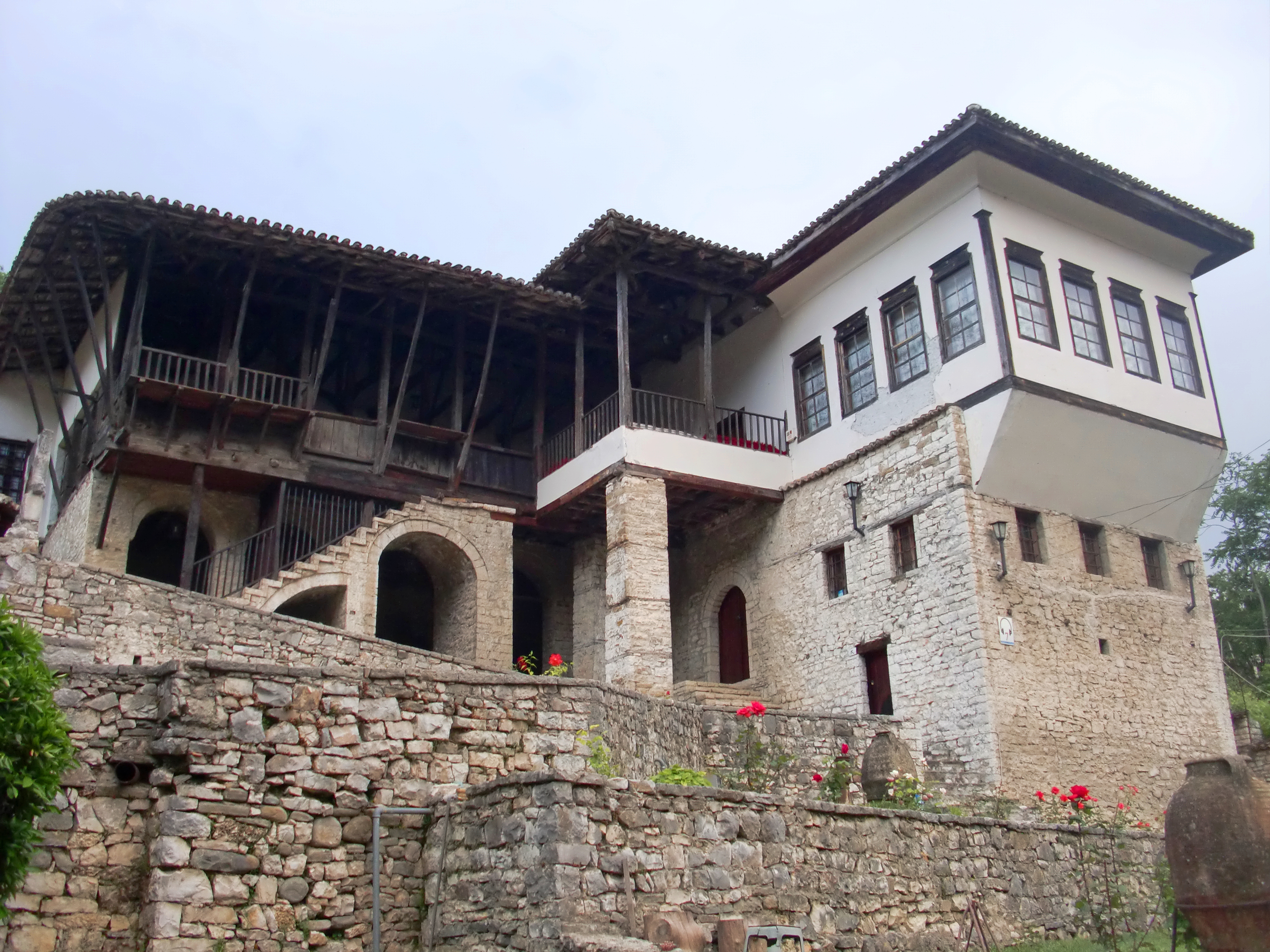
The Ethnographic Museum

The town is known for its historic architecture and scenery and is known as the "Town of One Window Above the Other", due to the many large windows of the old decorated houses overlooking the town.

The Citadel overlooks the river and the modern city as well as the old Christian quarter across the river. It is a well preserved area containing narrow streets, Turkish houses and Orthodox churches.

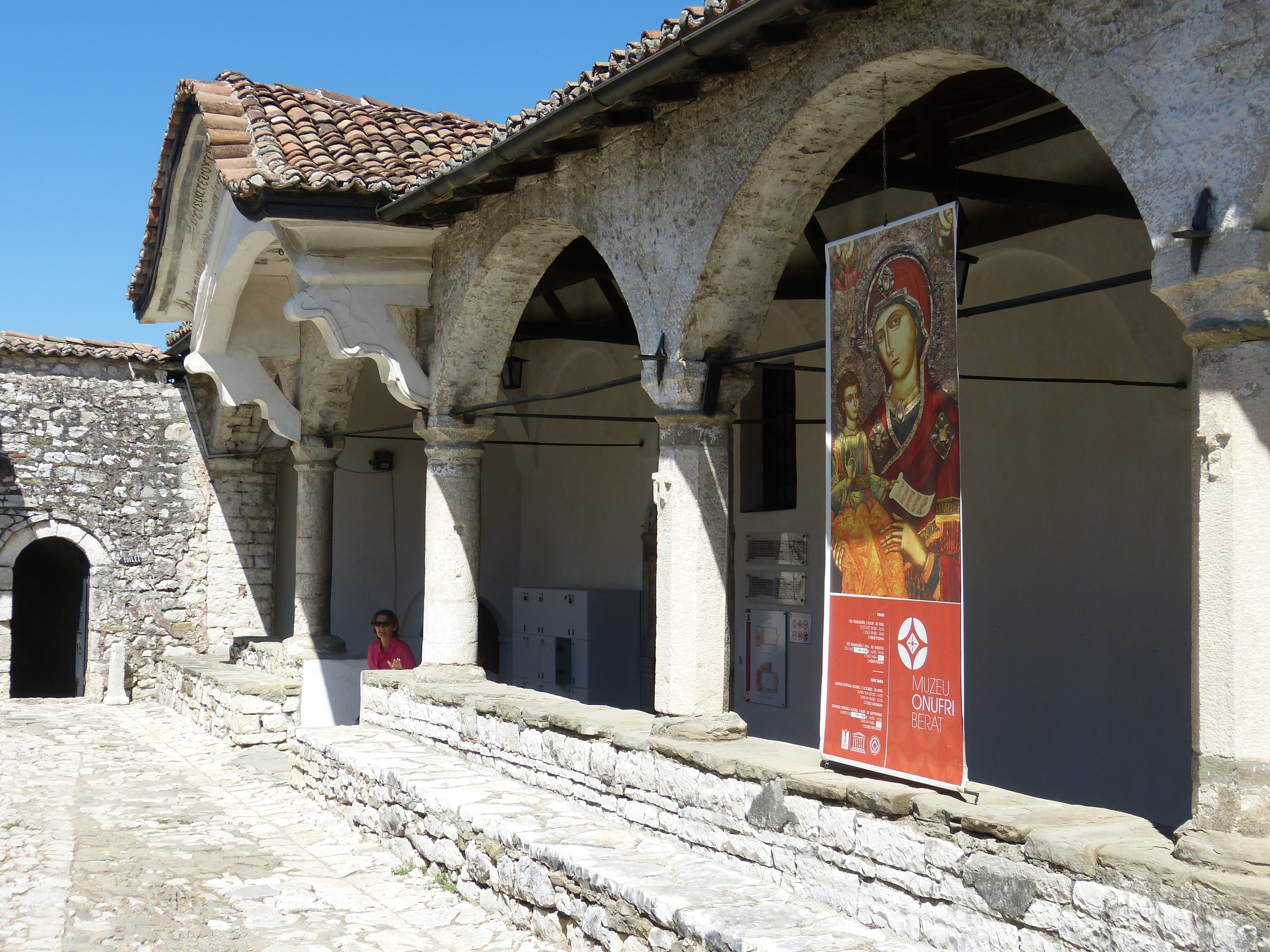
The Onufri Museum

Berat has a 15th-century mosque and a number of churches belonging to the Albanian Orthodox Church, whose autocephaly was proclaimed there in 1922. Several of the churches house works by the renowned 16th century painter Onufri.

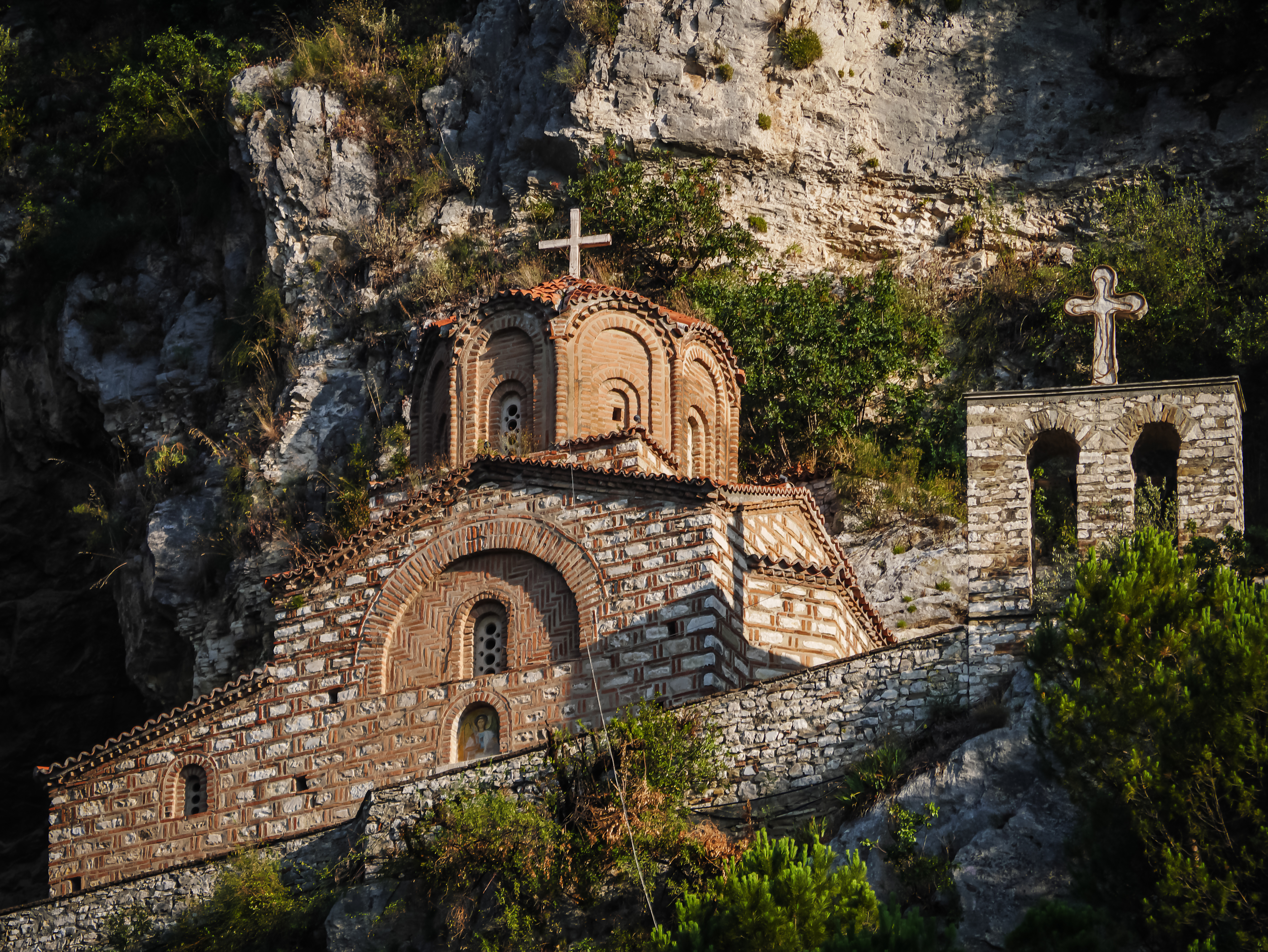
The St. Michael's Church of Berat

Berat National Ethnographic Museum opened in 1979. It contains a diversity of everyday objects from throughout Berat's history. The museum contains non-movable furniture which hold a number of household objects, wooden case, wall-closets, as well as chimneys and a well. Near the well is an olive press, wool press and many large ceramic dishes, revealing a glimpse of the historical domestic culture of Berat's citizens. The ground floor has a hall with a model of a medieval street with traditional shops on both sides. On the second floor is an archive, loom, village sitting room, kitchen and sitting room.

Gorica Bridge, which connects two parts of Berat, was originally built from wood in 1780 and was rebuilt with stone in the 1920s. The seven-arch bridge is 129 metres (423 ft) long and 5.3 metres (17 ft) wide and is built about 10 metres (33 ft) above the average water level. According to local legend, the original wooden bridge contained a dungeon in which a girl would be incarcerated and starved to appease the spirits responsible for the safety of the bridge.

=== Education ===
In addition to secondary schools, the city hosted the Albanian University in Berat, a private institution that terminated its programs in 2019.

=== Sports ===
The football (soccer) club is KS Tomori Berat.

== Twin towns – sister cities ==
Berat is twinned with:

- Amasya, Amasya Province, Turkey
- Bağcılar, Istanbul, Turkey
- Bérat, Occitania, France
- Fermo, Marche, Italy
- Karmiel, Northern District, Israel
- Lovech, Lovech Province, Bulgaria
- Ploiești, Muntenia, Romania
- Prizren, Prizren District, Kosovo
- Ulcinj, Montenegro

== Municipal Council ==
Seat distribution in the Municipal Council

Following the 2023 local elections, the composition of the Council of Berat is as follows:

Name	Abbr.	Seats
Socialist Party of Albania; Partia Socialiste e Shqipërisë	PS	20
Together We Win; Bashkë Fitojmë	BF	7
Democratic Party of Albania; Partia Demokratike e Shqipërisë	PD	3
Party for Justice, Integration and Unity; Partia Drejtësi, Integrim dhe Unitet	PDIU	1

== Notable people ==
- Omer Pasha Vrioni II - Albanian ruler from one of the most powerful Albanian families of the 19th century, modern founder of the city Fier.
- Babë Dudë Karbunara - Teacher and politician. One of the signatories of the Albanian Declaration of Independence.
- Christopher of Albania - Primate of the Orthodox Autocephalous Church of Albania from 1937 to 1948.
- Eni Koçi - Singer.
- Sotir Kolea - Folklorist, Diplomat and activist of the Albanian National Awakening.
- Afërdita Veveçka Priftaj - Physicist.
- Myrto Uzuni - Professional footballer; winger for Spanish club Granada and the Albania national football team.
- Aziz Vrioni - Ottoman-Albanian politician.
- Iliaz Vrioni - Politician and land owner; served as Prime Minister of Albania three times.
- Isuf Vrioni - Translator, diplomat, and Albanian ambassador to UNESCO.
- Omer Vrioni - Ottoman-Albanian figure in the Greek War of Independence.
- Sami Bey Vrioni - Politician, diplomat.
- Dhimitër Tutulani - Lawyer and Politician.
- Kasëm Trebeshina - Partisan, communist prosecutor, actor, and writer.
- Margarita Tutulani - Anti-fascist activist of Albania during World War II.
- Constantine of Berat - Albanian writer of the 18th century.
- Sulejman Naibi - Albanian writer.
- Vexhi Buharaja - Albanian literary worker, translator and orientalist.

== See also ==
- List of mayors of Berat
- Codex Beratinus

== Bibliography ==
- Astin, A. E. (1998). The Cambridge ancient history: Rome and the Mediterranean to 133 B.C. Cambridge University Press. ISBN 978-0-521-23448-1.
- Baker, Gabriel (2020). Spare No One: Mass Violence in Roman Warfare. Rowman & Littlefield. ISBN 978-1-5381-1222-9.
- Cohen, Getzel M.; Walbank, F. W. (1995). The Hellenistic settlements in Europe, the islands, and Asia Minor. University of California Press. ISBN 978-0-520-08329-5.
- Fiedler, M.; Lahi, B.; Shehi, E.; Pánczél, S.-P.; Velo, K.; Döhner, Gregor (2021). "Ausgrabungen in der Kleinsiedlung Babunjë bei Apollonia (Albanien) Bericht zu den Kampagnen 2018–2019". Mitteilungen des Deutschen Archäologischen Instituts, Römische Abteilung. 127: 110–144.
- Fine, John V. A. (1994). The Late Medieval Balkans: A Critical Survey from the Late Twelfth Century to the Ottoman Conquest. University of Michigan Press. ISBN 0-472-08260-4.
- Hoti, Afrim (2022). "Dyrrhachium bizantina e il suo territorio (VI-VIII sec.)". In Sonia Antonelli; Vasco La Salvia; Maria Cristina Mancini; Oliva Menozzi; Marco Moderato; Maria Carla Somma (eds.). Archaeologiae Una storia al plural: Studi in memoria di Sara Santoro. Archaeopress Publishing. pp. 245–250. ISBN 978-1-80327-297-9.
- Morgan, Peter (2011). Kadare: Shkrimtari dhe diktatura 1957-1990 (1 ed.). Tiranë: Shtëpia Botuese "55". ISBN 978-9928-106-12-4.
- Morton, Jacob Nathan (2017). "Shifting Landscapes, Policies, And Morals: A Topographically Driven Analysis Of The Roman Wars In Greece From 200 Bc To 168 Bc". Publicly Accessible Penn Dissertations. 2484. University of Pennsylvania. Archived from the original on 17 September 2019.
- Nicol, Donald MacGillivray (2010), The Despotate of Epiros 1267–1479: A Contribution to the History of Greece in the Middle Ages, Cambridge University Press, ISBN 978-0-521-13089-9
- Pollo, Stefanaq (1984), Historia e Shqipërisë: Vitet 30 të shek. XIX-1912 (in Albanian), Akademia e Shkencave e RPS të Shqipërisë, Instituti i Historisë, OCLC 165705732
- Šašel Kos, Marjeta (1997). "Dassaretia". In Hubert, Cancik; Schneider, Helmuth (eds.). Der neue Pauly: Enzyklopädie der Antike. Altertum: Cl-Epi. Vol. 3. Metzler. ISBN 978-3-476-01473-3.
- Thëngjilli, Petrika (1978), Kryengritjet popullore ne vitet 30 te shekulit XIX (documenta osmane), Akademia e Shkencave e Republikës Popullore Socialiste të Shqipërisë, Instituti i Historisë
- Zindel, Christian; Lippert, Andreas; Lahi, Bashkim; Kiel, Machiel (2018). Albanien: Ein Archäologie- und Kunstführer von der Steinzeit bis ins 19. Jahrhundert (in German). Vandenhoeck & Ruprecht. ISBN 978-3-205-20010-9.
