= Ilir Gjoni =

Albanian politician (born 1962)

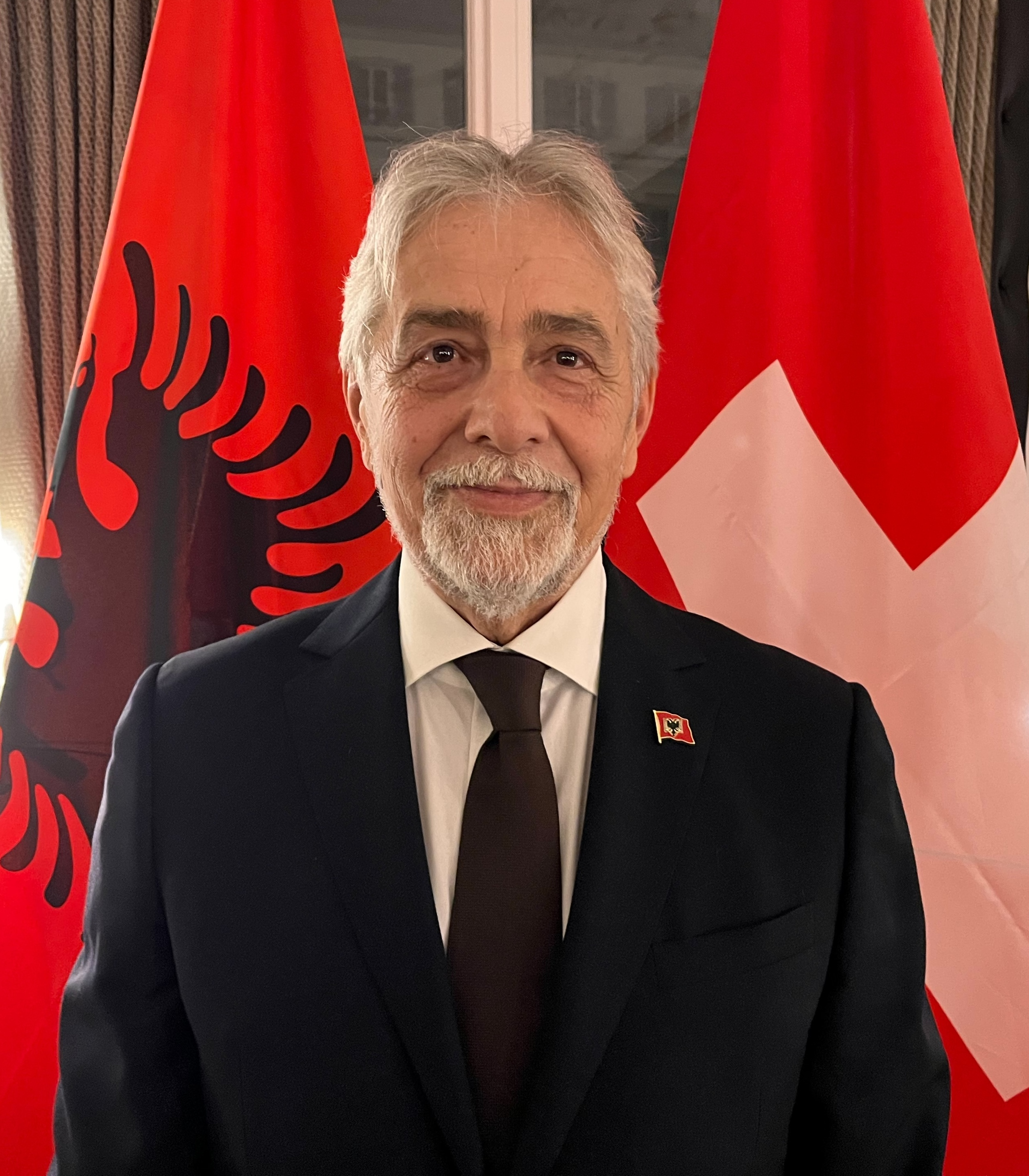

Minister of Internal Affairs
- In office 8 November 2000 – 22 February 2002
- President: Rexhep Meidani
- Prime Minister: Ilir Meta
- Preceded by: Spartak Poçi
- Succeeded by: Stefan Çipa

26th Defence Minister of Albania
- In office 7 July 2000 – 8 November 2000
- President: Rexhep Meidani
- Prime Minister: Ilir Meta
- Preceded by: Luan Hajdaraga
- Succeeded by: Ismail Lleshi

Personal details
- Born: 20 April 1962 (age 64)
- Parent: Xhelil Gjoni (father)

Ilir Gjoni (born 20 April 1962) is an Albanian politician. He served as the Minister of Defence of Albania from 7 July 2000 to 8 November 2000, and Minister of Internal Affairs from 8 November 2000 to 22 February 2002. He was appointed interior minister following the dismissal of Spartak Poçi and general reshuffle of the Cabinet. Gjoni oversaw an increase in the defensive readiness of Albania on its border with Montenegro following the 13 April 1999 Albania–Yugoslav border incident.

On 7 September 2000, Gjoni signed a memorandum of agreement with the governments of the United States of America, Germany, and Norway, wherein the government of Albania promised to destroy over 130,000 weapons it had collected from the civilian population of the country, as well as surplus military weapons in an effort to disarm post-conflict countries, reduce tensions in the Balkans and reduce illicit small arms trade. U.S. Assistant Secretary of State for Political-Military Affairs Eric D. Newsom was present for this signing.

By 2010, Gjoni served as vice-chairman of the Parliament of Albania and as a member of Albania's National Security Committee.

Succeeding Mehmet Elezi, he was Albanian ambassador to Switzerland in Bern since 2013. Since September 2023, he is ambassador of Albania to NATO in Brussels.

== Personal life ==
He is the son of Xhelil Gjoni, a former secretary of the Central Committee of the Communist Party of Albania. Xhelil Gjoni was reported to have close ties to Sali Berisha, the former president of Albania, former prime minister and leader of the main opposition Democratic Party.
