= Vlado Makelarski =

Macedonian partisan

Vlado Makelarski (Macedonian: Владо Макеларски; 1919–1993) was a Macedonian Partisan in World War II.

== Life ==
Makelarski was born in the village of Maqellarë, Albania in 1919 and completed schooling in nearby Debar, Yugoslavia, where he also worked as a waiter. In 1936, he moved with his parents to Skopje where, with his brother's influence, he joined the League of Communist Youth of Yugoslavia. His and his brother's apartment was used as a place for illegal communist meetings. In 1943, the apartment was raided with several arrested, while Makelarski was sentenced to death in absentia by the occupying Bulgarian authorities.

Following the war, he became director of the ceramics factory "Yug" in Skopje. After the Tito-Stalin split, Makelarski took the side of the Comintern and was subsequently jailed at Goli Otok.

Makelarski died on 29 January 1993. He was a recipient of the Commemorative Medal of the Partisans of 1941.
