= Xhelil Gjoni =

Albanian politician (1938–2026)

Member of the People's Assembly
- In office 1991–1992
- President: Ramiz Alia

Secretary of the Central Committee of the Party
- In office August 1990 – December 1990
- President: Ramiz Alia

Personal details
- Born: 3 November 1938 Maqellarë, Dibër, Albania
- Died: 14 February 2026 (aged 87) Tirana, Albania
- Party: Party of Labour of Albania
- Other political affiliations: Socialist Party of Albania
- Children: Ilir Gjoni

Xhelil Gjoni (3 November 1938 – 14 February 2026) was an Albanian politician of the Albanian Workers' Party (PPSh) and journalist.

== Life and career ==
Gjoni was born on 3 November 1938 in Maqellarë, Dibër District. He took his first studies in his home town, and during 1952–1956 followed the Pedagogical School in Peshkopi. During 1956–1961 he resided in the Soviet Union, where he studied philosophy in Moscow and Leningrad. After returning to Albania in 1961, he started working for the Zëri i Popullit newspaper. He would remain there for 17 years, transgressing from a journalist, to manager-editor, later vice editor-in-chief, and finally Chief Editor.
In 1975, he served as Secretary of the Party for Propaganda in Tirana. In December 1984, he took over as First Secretary of the Party for Krujë District. He would follow a similar position in his native Dibër District during 1987–1990. In August 1990, he would reach the top of his political career. Gjoni took over as Secretary of the Central Committee of the Party, at the same time First Secretary of the Party in Tirana. He held these positions until the 10th and last Congress of PPSh. During the collapse of communism, Gjoni became in July 1990 Politburo of the Party of Labour of Albania. He is remembered as arrogant, brutal, and a man of scandals. Apparently he was chosen by Ramiz Alia in a very delicate moment as a "strong hand".

He was also a representative in the National Assembly (Kuvendi Popullor) during the 12th legislature between 1991 and 1992. During this time he served on the governing board of the Socialist Party of Albania (Alb: Partia Socialiste e Shqipërisë), the successor organization to the PPSh.

His son Ilir Gjoni was occasionally Internal Affairs and Defense Minister of Albania in the governments of Prime Minister Ilir Meta.

Gjoni died in Tirana on 14 February 2026, at the age of 87. He was buried at Sharra Memorial Park Cemetery in Tirana, on 15 February.
