= Ismail Lleshi =

Albanian politician (born 1947)

Defence Minister of Albania
- In office 8 November 2000 – 12 September 2001
- Preceded by: Ilir Gjoni
- Succeeded by: Pandeli Majko

Personal details
- Born: 2 October 1947 (age 78) Banisht, Dibër
- Party: Party of Labour of Albania (To 1991); Socialist Party of Albania (From 1991)

Ismail Lleshi (born 2 October 1947) is an Albanian politician.

He served as the Minister of Defence of Albania from 8 November 2000 to 12 September 2001. He was appointed Defence Minister following the promotion of Ilir Gjoni to the position of Interior Minister. He was a veteran of the Socialist Party of Albania at the time of his appointment, and was listed in the party leadership as far back as 1993. As Defence Minister, he frequently met with foreign military leaders.

He was also a senior leader of the Labour Party, the predecessor to the Socialist Party.
