= Dhimitër Tutulani =

Albanian lawyer and politician

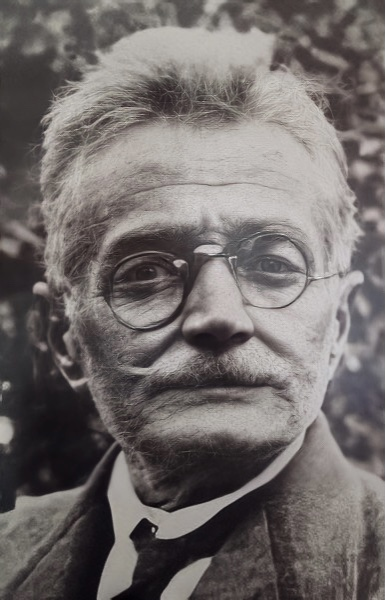
- Born: 19 March 1857; Berat, Sanjak of Avlona, Ottoman Empire (modern Albania)
- Died: 1937 (aged 79–80); Berat, Kingdom of Albania
- Other names: Dhimitraq Tutulani
- Occupations: Lawyer, politician
- Known for: Albanian Declaration of Independence; Congress of Berat, 1922
- Spouse: Marie Nova
- Children: Miltiadh Tutulani (Son)

Dhimitër Tutulani (19 March 1857 – 1937), also known as Taq Tutulani or Dhimitraq Tutulani, was an Albanian lawyer and politician from city of Berat. He was one of the signatories of the Albanian Declaration of Independence.

== Life ==
Dhimitër Tutulani was born in the Goricë neighbourhood of Berat, on 19 March 1857, in a relatively rich Aromanian family. His family roots originated from Vithkuq, near Korçë, having been settled there after they left Voskopojë. Tutulani family had settled to Berat and since then had been merchants. Certain old toponyms in Berat, i.e. "Ara e Tutulanëve" (Tutulani's field) or "Çezma e Tutulanit" (Tutulani's drinking fountain) give hints on the economical state and prestige of the family.
After finishing the first studies in his home town, he finished the Zosimea high school in Yannina where he learned several foreign languages, and later studied at the University of Athens where he graduated in jurisprudence. During his studies he got in touch with the philosophies of Illuminism and Humanism, which had been the precursors of the freedom movements throughout the Balkans. Tutulani returned home and opened a law firm, working as a lawyer. He married Marie Nova from the Kala neighborhood of the town. The couple had a son and two daughters.

Tutulani joined the intellectual and patriotic circles in Berat, cooperating with Jorgji (Dudë) Karbunara, Sulo Resuli, Llambi Goxhomani, Jorgji Manushi, Nyzhet Vrioni. On 22 December 1908, the patriotic club "Bashkimi" ("The Union"), opened in Berat, being one of the many with the same name among Albanian towns and colonies. The club gathered patriotic elements from various social groups, which performed patriotic activities while being masked as cultural ones. Tutulani would soon become one of the strongest and more eloquent voices inside the club.
In 1911, the Committee of Albanians for Defending the National Rights (Albanian: Komiteti i Shqiptarëve për Mbrojtjen e të Drejtave Kombëtare) was formed in Berat. It was led by a Consulting Counsel (Albanian: Pleqësia Këshillonjëse), while on 23 July 1912 the Assembly of Sinjë would take place. The Assembly went along with the Albanian Revolt of 1912 and came out with political demands, including the Autonomy of Albania. Tutulani's active role in all events brought him to being chosen as a delegate at the Assembly of Vlora together with Jorgji Karbunara and Iliaz Vrioni, which would culminate with the Albanian Declaration of Independence on 28 November 1912. Tutulani was a signatory, signing as Dh. Tout.

Six years later, in December 1918, he was elected delegate of Berat at the Congress of Durrës which took place during 25–27 December. The congress was a serious endeavor in establishing a continuity in the newly created Albanian state after World War I, and came out with a provisional government. Two years later, he was again delegate, this time at the Congress of Lushnje which would establish the territorial and political sovereignty of Albania.

Tutulani has left traces in the social and cultural perspective as well. He was a delegate at the Congress of Berat. This time the congress was about the declaration of the Orthodox Autocephalous Church of Albania. It was held on 10 September 1922 inside a school in the Mangalem neighborhood. Fan Noli and other patriotic religious (orthodox) figures came out with the decision which disconnect the Albanian church from the Church of Constantinople, and the Albanian orthodox population from the Greek influence under the moto '"Free church in a free state"' (Albanian: "Kishë e lirë në shtet të lirë"). Tutulani served for 35 years as member of Dhimogjerondia in the Metropolis of Berat until his death.

He also server in a few public positions. In 1923 he was elected vice prefect, and in January 1925 he became mayor of Berat. In the first local elections of the town, held in May 1922, he was a member of the Election Commission. In 1930, he was voted as Permanent Council Members from the Municipal Assembly of Berat. He also served in civic administrative organizations.

Tutulani died in his beloved town of Berat, having written a will stating that part of his wealth should go to the town, for improving education, infrastructure, and helping those in need.

Dhimiter Tutulani was the father of Miltiadh Tutulani, member of Albanian Senate 1922-1923, Albanian Minister of Justice of Ahmet Zogu's government September 1925 - September 1928, Minister of Finances of Koço Kota's governments of September 1928 - January 1929, and January 1929 - March 1930, and Minister of Justice of Pandeli Evangjeli's government of January 1933 - October 1935.
His grandson and granddaughter Kristaq & Margarita Tutulani were nationalist and anti-fascist activists during World War II, and were arrested, tortured, and execute by the Italians in the Gosë village near Kavajë in July 1943. Both are awarded "People's Hero" (Albanian: Hero i Popullit).
