= Holy Transfiguration Church, Herebel =

Church in Albania

Coordinates: 41.6182°N 20.4709°E

St. Saviour's Church
- Kisha e Shën Sotirit (Albanian); Црква "Свети Преображение" (Macedonian)
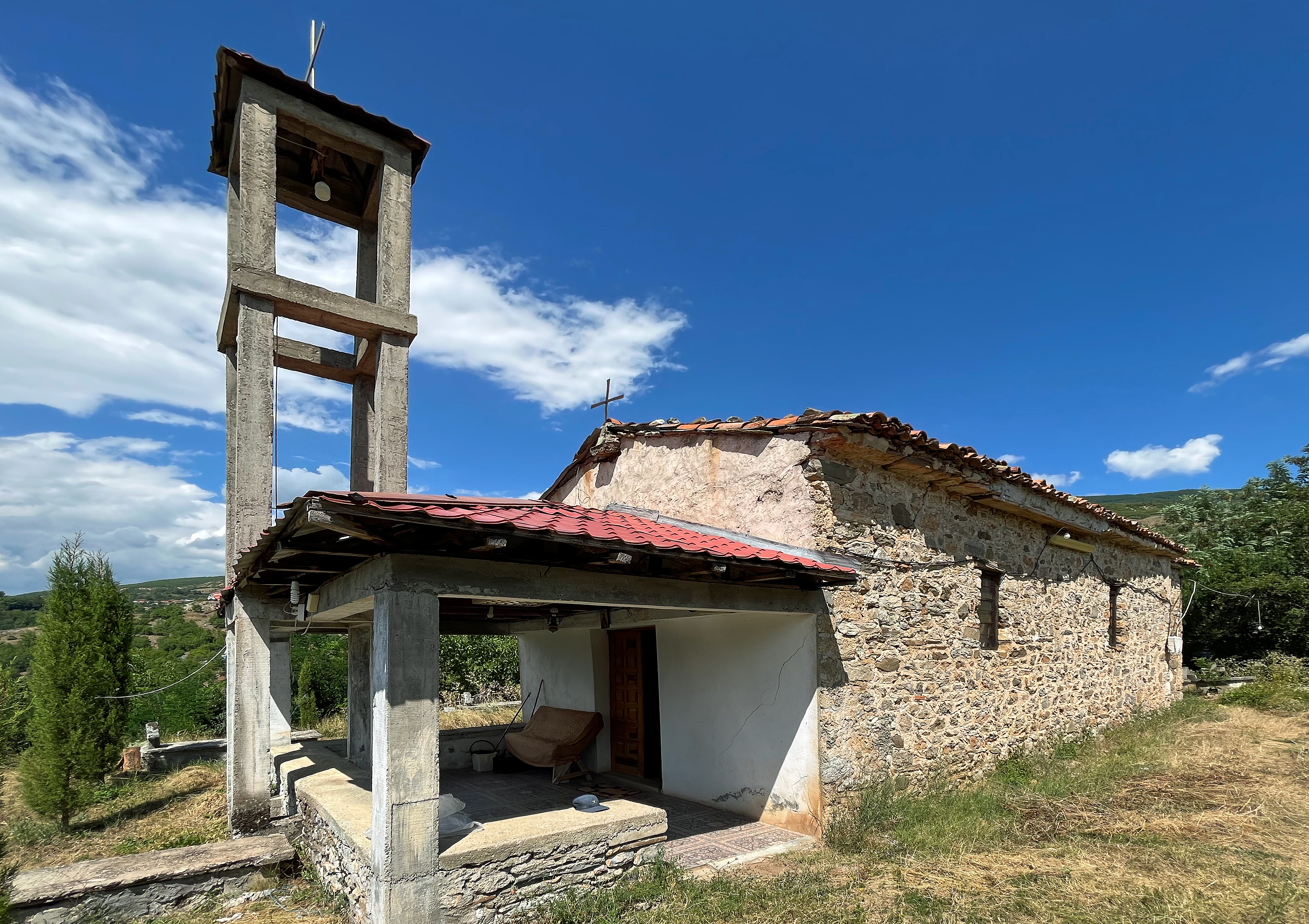
- Interactive map of St. Saviour's Church
- Location: Herebel

History
- Built: 12th century

Cultural Monument of Albania
- Designated: 1970

The Holy Transfiguration Church (Albanian: Kisha e Shpërfytyrimit; Macedonian: Црква "Свети Преображение") is a church in Herebel, Dibër County, Albania. Established in the 12th century, it was declared a Cultural Monument of Albania in 1970.

There is an annual celebration at the church, occurring on the 18th and 19 August. While primarily attended by the Macedonian Christian population, it is also attended by Muslims.

In 2018, a dozen icons were donated to the church by the nearby Saint Jovan Bigorski Monastery.
