= Halveti Teqe, Herebel =

Historic site in Herebel, Diber County, Albania

Halveti Teqe
- Teqeja e Halvetive (Albanian)
- Interactive map of Halveti Teqe
- 41.6199°N 20.4696°E
- Location: Herebel, Diber County

Cultural Monument of Albania

The Halveti Teqe (Albanian: Teqeja e Helvetive) is a Cultural Monument of Albania, located in Herebel, Diber County.
