= Halveti Teqe (Prizren) =

The Halveti's tekke (Albanian: Teqja e Halvetive) is a 350-year-old tariqah in the center of Prizren. The tekke object of the Halveti is found in the Saraçët neighborhood, near the Kukli Mehmed Bey's mosque. The Havlet Tariqah was established at the end of the 16th century, by father Osman who came to Prizren and lived in Kukli Mehmet-Bey's mosque. The object is simple, built of stone and mud while the coverage is made from traditional brick. The tekke complex consists of several buildings, such as the tekke, rites room (semihane), shrine, residential building and waiting room. More generally, the complex consists of two parts – the tekke and the rites room.

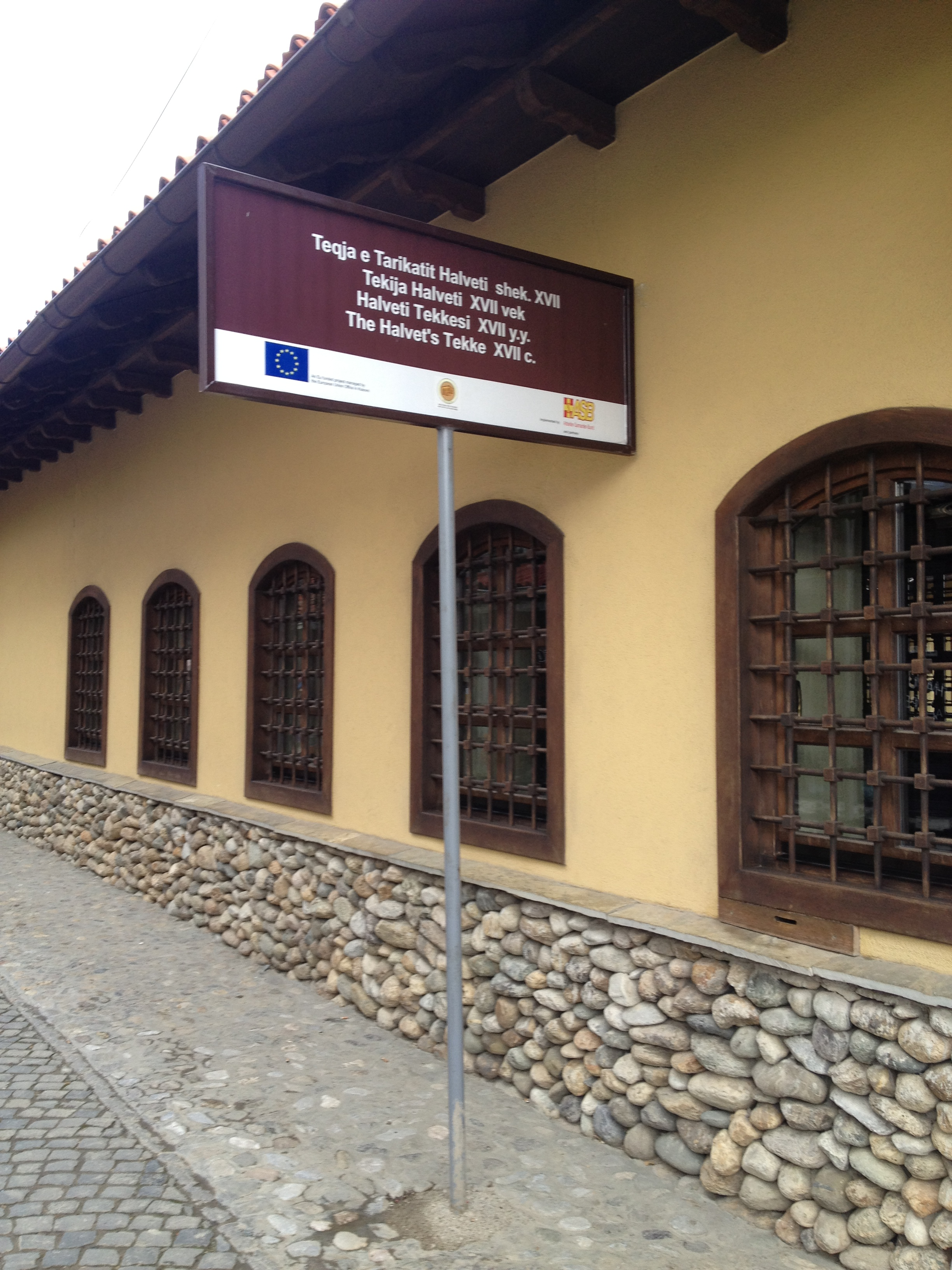
The Halveti's tekke in Prizren, Kosovo

Ceremonies of this tariqah are held in a room decorated with wooden cabinets and shelves, swords of its members, ornamental items used during ceremonies and series of whitish felt hoods.
