= Halveti Tekke, Berat =

Tekke in Berat, Albania

Halveti Tekke
- Teqeja e Helvetive
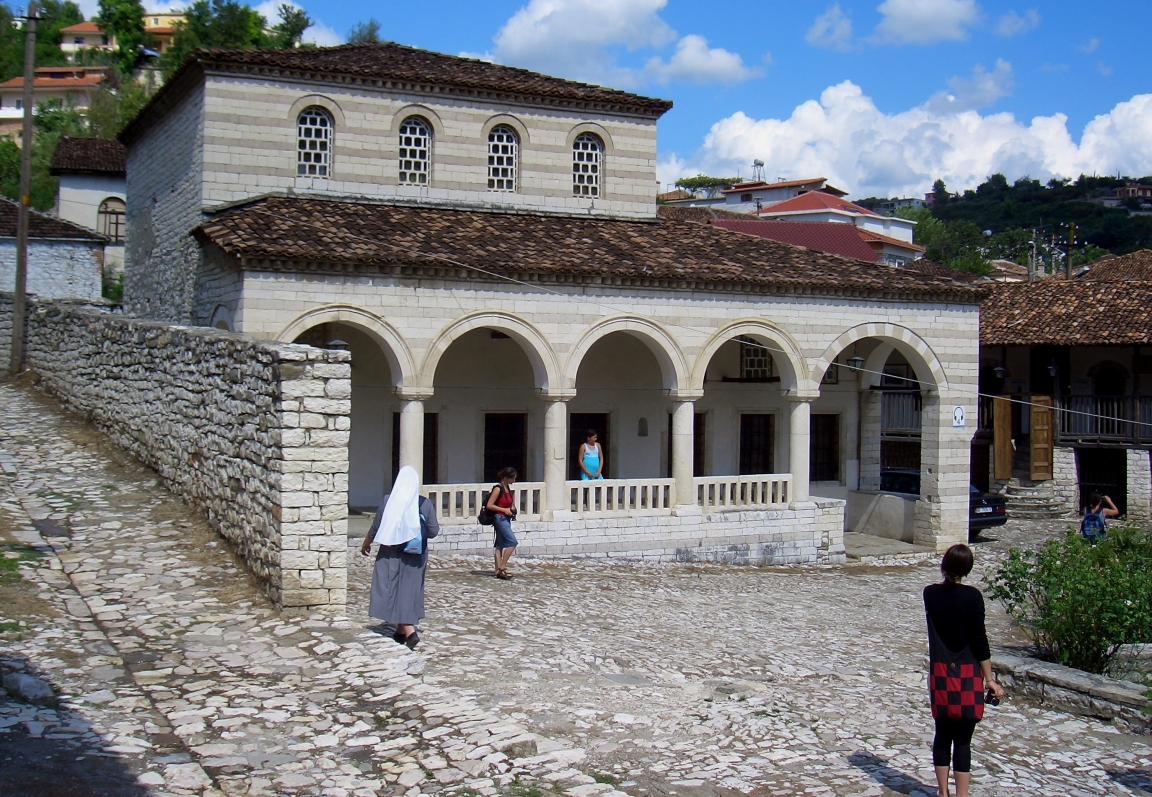
- The tekke exterior, in 2010

- Location of the tekke in Albania

Religion
- Affiliation: Sunni Islam
- Sect: Sufism
- Rite: Khalwati order
- Ecclesiastical or organizational status: Tekke
- Status: Active

Location
- Location: Berat
- Country: Albania
- Interactive map of Halveti Tekke
- Coordinates: 40°42′22″N 19°57′09″E

Architecture
- Architect: Ahmet Kurt Pasha
- Type: Islamic architecture
- Style: Ottoman
- Completed: 1782 CE
- Minaret: 1

Cultural Monument of Albania
- Official name: Halveti Tekke
- Reference no.: BR448

The Halveti Tekke (Albanian: Teqeja e Helvetive) is a tekke, located in Berat, Albania. Completed in 1782 CE, the tekke was designated as a Cultural Monument of Albania and forms part of the Historic Centres of Berat and Gjirokastër, designated as a UNESCO World Heritage Site in 2005.

== Overview ==
The teqe (cemevi in Turkish) was built in 1782 by Ahmet Kurt Pasha and pertained to the Khalwati order, a Sufi sect.

The tekke is composed of a prayer hall with a square plan, a small ambience for special religious services, and a gracious portico in front of the entrance to the prayer hall. In the prayer hall is a mafil carved in wood and decorated. On the eastern side of the prayer hall is the mihrab decorated with stone stalactites. The inner walls have been decorated with eight frescoes, depicting dwelling houses, Muslim religious buildings, and landscapes.

The walls below the frescoes are covered by holes that improve the acoustics in the prayer hall. The ceiling of the prayer hall is made of wood and is decorated with paintings. The ceiling has been decorated in the Baroque style adopted in Islamic art and is covered with 14-carat gold plates. The inner decorations were carried out by Master Dush Barka. Attached to the prayer hall is a room in which once was the mausoleum of Ahmet Kurt Pasha and his son.

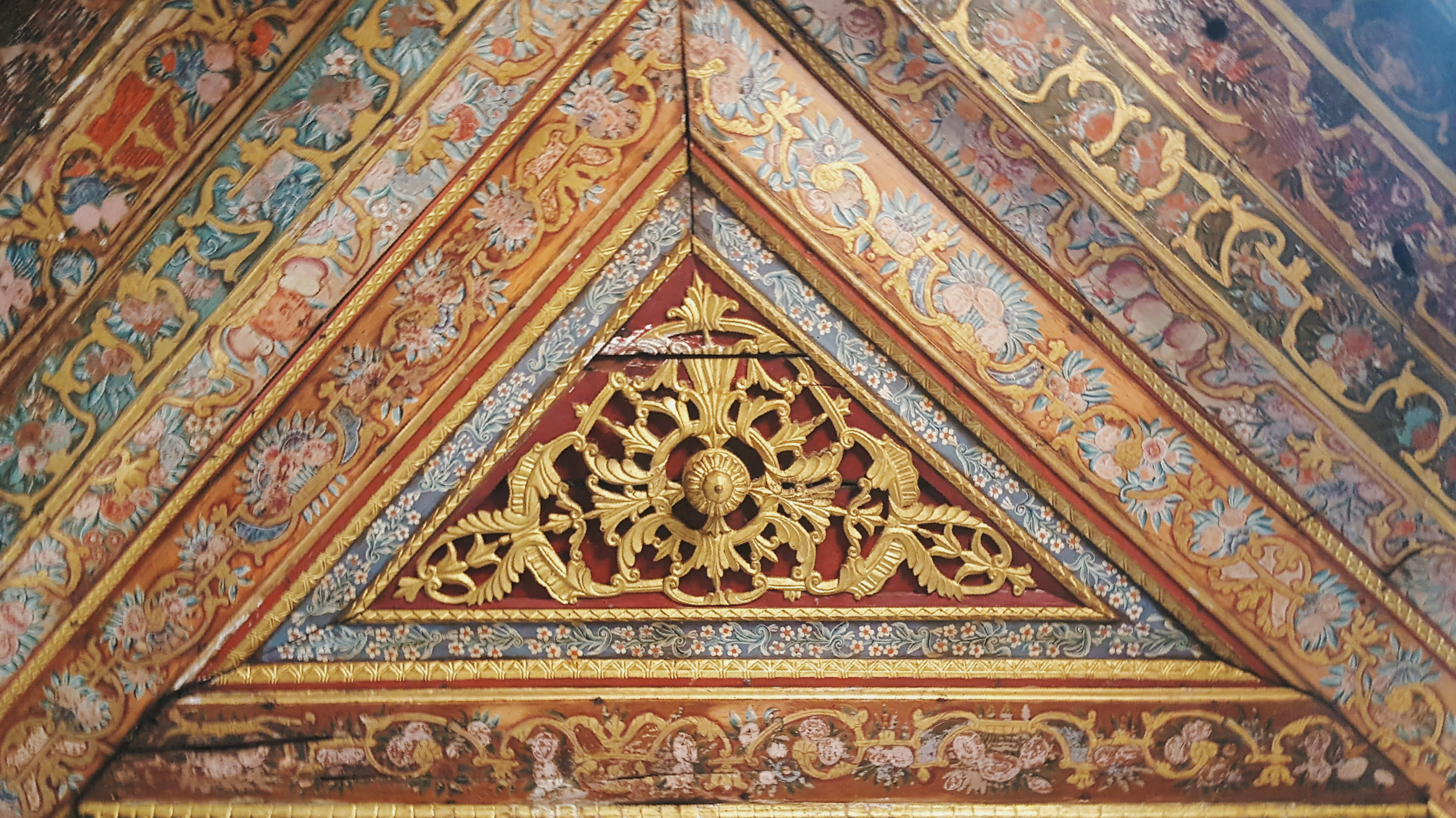
Detail of the tekke interior

The portico of the tekke has five stone columns which were taken from the Ancient Greek city of Apollonia. Above the main door in the portico is an inscription dedicated to the values of the tekke and to Ahmet Kurt Pasha. Monuments dating to the late Ottoman period from the Albanian Vrioni family exist such as the gate to a former palace and a tomb, other monuments are from the Vlora family.

== See also ==
- Islam in Albania
- List of Religious Cultural Monuments of Albania
