= Maqellarë =

Maqellarë Макелари
- Administrative unit
- Location within Albania
- Coordinates: 41°35′N 20°30′E
- Country: Albania
- County: Dibër
- Municipality: Dibër

Population (2011)
  - Administrative unit: 10,662
- Time zone: UTC+1 (CET)
  - Summer (DST): UTC+2 (CEST)

Maqellarë (Macedonian: Макелари/Makelari or Макеларе/Makelare) is a village and a former municipality in the Dibër County, northeastern Albania. At the 2015 local government reform it became a subdivision of the municipality Dibër. The population at the 2011 census was 10,662.

== Demographics ==
Maqellarë is recorded in the Ottoman defter of 1467 as a settlement in the ziamet of Dibra (within the vilayet of Upper Dibra) and a hass property belonging to the soubashi Ahmet Bey. The village had a total of seven households and the anthroponymy attested is almost exclusively Slavic in character, with a single instance of Albanian anthroponymy (Lisimadi).

According to the statistics of Vasil Kanchov, in 1900 the town had 240 Muslim Bulgarian inhabitants and 210 Christian Bulgarian inhabitants. However, Kanchov noted that the inhabitants of the village preferred to be called Albanians and that they spoke Albanian.

The wider Maqellarë municipality, however, includes a number of predominantly Albanian towns that were not listed in Kanchov's study as they were not part of the Debar kaza. Of all the towns in the modern municipality that were included in Kanchov's study, Gradec and Kërçishtë e Epërme were primarily Bulgarian Christian, Herebel, Kllobuçisht and Kërçishtë e Poshtme were primarily Bulgarian Muslim, Maqellarë was Bulgarian divided between the two with slightly more Muslims, and six other towns were primarily Albanian Muslim: Vojnik, Majtarë, Erebarë, Kovashicë, Bllatë e Epërme and Bllatë e Poshtme; finally, one village, Grezhdan, had a mixed population of Albanian Muslims and Bulgarian Christians. Overall, the sum of the partial municipality shows that Muslims were in the largest religious group, Bulgarians the largest language group, and Albanian Muslims had a plurality with 1490 residents (44.7% of the partial municipality), living beside 985 Bulgarian Muslims (29.8% of the partial municipality), and 855 (25.7%) Bulgarian Christians. The Halveti Order had one structure in the modern commune, in the mixed Albanian Muslim and Bulgarian Christian town of Grezhdan.

According to the early 20th century newspaper Debar voice, the village of Maqellarë had 23 households affiliated with the Bulgarian Exarchate and 25 Muslim households.

During the first World War occupying Austro-Hungarian forces conducted a census (1916-1918) of parts of Albania they held. Of the area corresponding to the contemporary administrative unit of Maqellarë, settlements had the following ethnic and religious demographics:

- Burim (Allajbeg) was inhabited by 409 Albanians and 4 Romani with a total of 413 Muslims.
- Bllatë e Epërme - 177 Muslim Albanians.
- Bllatë e Poshtme - 196 Muslim Albanians.
- Çernen - 141 Muslim Albanians.
- Dovolan - 259 Albanians, 44 Bulgarians, 5 Romani: 258 Muslims, 51 Orthodox.
- Erebarë - 166 Muslim Albanians.
- Grezhdan - 234 Albanians, 19 Romani: 253 Muslims.
- Herebel - 74 Albanians, 136 others, 3 Romani: 77 Muslims, 136 Orthodox.
- Kërçisht i Epërm - 23 Albanians, 14 Bulgarians, 197 others: 37 Muslims, 197 Orthodox.
- Kërçisht i Poshtëm - 314 Muslim Albanians.
- Kllobçisht - 530 Albanians, 6 Romani: 536 Muslims.
- Kovashicë - 237 Muslim Albanians.
- Fushë e Vogël (Kurtbeg) - 112 Muslim Albanians.
- Majtarë - 247 Muslim Albanians.
- Maqellarë - 288 Albanians, 87 Bulgarians, 11 Romani: 290 Muslims, 96 Orthodox.
- Katund i Vogël (Obok) - 169 Albanians, 29 Bulgarians: 72 others: 165 Muslims, 106 Orthodox.
- Pesjak - 130 Muslim Albanians.
- Pocest - 604 Muslim Albanians.
- Popinar - 145 Muslim Albanians.
- Vojnik - 263 Albanians, 16 Romani: 279 Muslims.

Linguists Klaus Steinke and Xhelal Ylli consider the overall census results to be accurate and reflective of much of the ethnic and religious demographics of the area during that time, however noting that the then identity of the Orthodox Slavic speaking populace was fluid as reflected in census declarations. Toward the end of the 1920s the Orthodox Slavic speaking population was located in only two villages Herbel and Kërçisht i Epërm while in the 1930s the population decline of Orthodox Slavophones continued.

During the 2000s linguists Klaus Steinke and Xhelal Ylli seeking to corroborate villages cited in past literature as being Slavic speaking carried out fieldwork in villages of the area. In Herbel only 6 Orthodox Slavic speaking families made up of 3 larger households of around 20 individuals each remain. In Kërçisht i Epërm the village contains 200 inhabitants and 45 households, of which 6 are Orthodox families with a total of 17 individuals. On the eve of the collapse of communism in 1991, Kërçisht i Epërm had 110 households with 27 belonging to the Orthodox community.

Use of the Macedonian language in Kërçisht i Epërm is limited and facing extinction, due to usage being confined to the family. Albanian is also used in family settings especially by younger generations who have limited knowledge of Macedonian due to Albanian school influences and the demographic decline of the Slavic speaking population in the village. Linguists Steinke and Ylli also noted that unlike the Gollobordë region, the villages of the Maqellarë administrative unit area do not have any Muslim Slavic speaking inhabitants, and the village of Katund i Vogël (Obok) no longer has any Slavic Christians left and is inhabited only by Albanians.

== People from Maqellarë ==
- Xhelil Gjoni, communist politician
- Fiqiri Dine, Prime Minister of Albania (1944) and Balli Kombëtar activist
- Vlado Makelarski, WWII partisan
- Arbana Osmani, television presenter
