= Lurë-Dejë Mountain National Park =

National park in Albania

- Parku Kombëtar Lurë-Mali i Dejës
- IUCN category II (national park)
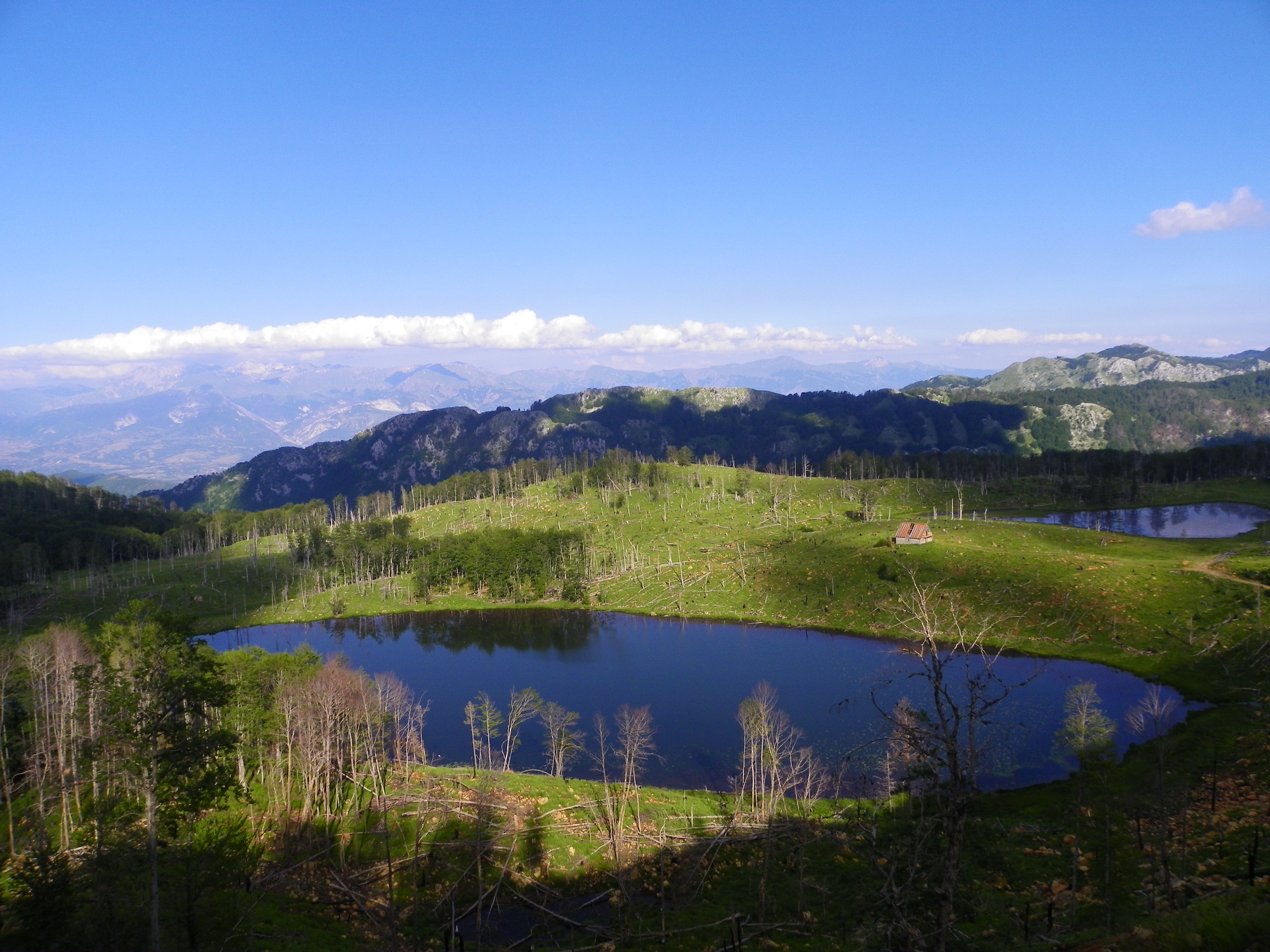
- View of Lake Kallaba

- Location within Albania Location within Europe
- Location: Dibër County
- Nearest city: Peshkopi
- Coordinates: 41°48′0″N 20°14′0″E
- Area: 19,288.88 hectares (192.8888 km^{2})
- Designated: 21 November 1966
- Governing body: National Agency of Protected Areas

Lurë-Dejë Mountain National Park (Albanian: Parku Kombëtar "Lurë-Mali i Dejës") is a national park in northeastern Albania, spanning an expanded area of 202.42 km^{2} (78.15 sq mi) since 2018 by encompassing the entire section of Kunora e Lurës, former Zall-Gjocaj National Park, and Dejë Mountain. The park was originally established in 1966 to protect the various ecosystems and biodiversity as Lura National Park. The altitude vary from 1,500–2,300 m (4,921–7,546 ft). The International Union for Conservation of Nature (IUCN) has listed the park as Category II. Nevertheless, it is described as an important Bird and Plant Area, because it supports significant bird and plant species.

== Geography ==
In behalf to a great variability in elevation, Lurë-Dejës Mt National Park is densely populated in vegetation. Higher plant life consists mainly of both coniferous and deciduous trees, particularly around the shores of the lakes. The most common tree native to Lurë is the European beech along with silver fir, black pine, red pine and bosnian pine. Especially protected is the balkan pine, which is threatened with extinction and only common in the west of the Balkan Peninsula. The southern section of the park has a meadow of multicolour flowers and several coniferous trees, which is called the Field of Mares, offering pristine views over the landscape. In terms of phytogeography, the park falls within the Pindus Mountains mixed forests terrestrial ecoregion of the Palearctic Mediterranean forests, woodlands, and scrub biome.

== Flora and fauna ==
The park shelters numerous species. Most important wildlife inhabiting the park includes the European brown bear, Eurasian lynx, Eurasian wolf, European pine marten, roe deer and western capercaillie. Small mammals include the red squirrel and edible dormouse. The twelve glacial lakes within the national park were formed during the ice age. They are located in the northeastern part of the nation in the Dibër County at an elevation between 1,200 and 1,500 m (3,937 and 4,921 ft). Each lake carries a name associated with its most characteristic feature.

Zall Gjoçaj, part of the expanded park, is an intensively fissured and mountainous landscape with a great variety of natural features including valleys, glacial lakes and dense forests without human intervention. Elevations in the area vary from 600 metres to over 2,000 metres above the Adriatic. The geomorphological conditions of the region reflect the dynamic geological history, tectonic movements and erosive activity of the rivers flowing through the park.

Most of the area is covered by a mixture of beech, fir, pine, ash and maple trees growing on limestone and dolomite.

According to Albanian poet Gjergj Fishta, "Him/her who has not seen Lura, he/she has not seen Albania", meanwhile British renowned traveler Edith Durham has been quoted as follows: "When I came up the Qafë Lurë, I saw such a beautiful field, that I had never seen in any place of the Balkans".

== Post-communism ==
Following the fall of communism in the 1990s, the area suffered massive deforestation from illegal logging and forest fires that severely affected ecosystems. It is estimated that as much as 50% of the original Lura National Park has been destroyed. In 2014, the Government of Albania launched a controversial rehabilitation campaign including reforestation, roadwork, and the putting of new signs.

Local stakeholders have criticized the project as merely superficial. In the meantime, local non-governmental organizations such as Ecovolis are trying to revitalize the park by planting of trees and removing debris around the lakes, some of which are drying up. Nature is also helping by naturally spreading seeds of new trees which are growing at different areas of the park.

Accommodation consists of several family run hotels and guesthouses near the park in Fushë-Lurë. The area around Lura features traditional tower houses, the once industrial mining town of Kurbnesh, Ottoman mosques, and a recently renovated Catholic Church. The region is also home to Albanian Independence signatory Dom Nikollë Kaçorri.

In May 2002, Joseph Limprecht, who served as the US ambassador to Albania, died from a heart attack, at the age of 55, while visiting Lure National Park.

== Outlook ==
In 2018, the park was expanded and renamed Lurë-Mt Dejës National Park to include former Zall-Gjocaj National Park for a total coverage area of 20,242 ha. The Albanian government has outlined a plan that would turn the area into an agritourism hot-spot under the 100 Villages Initiative, consisting in the renovation of traditional tower houses, and the reconstruction of the road connecting the park with Rreshen and the A1 motorway. Construction works for the latter started in late 2021 with the widening and stabilization of the existing road structure.

=== Reforestation ===
In 2019, a number of local NGOs such as Co-Plan and North Green Association in collaboration with local stakeholders planted 1000 new trees inside the protected area.

In 2020, GIZ Albania undertook the planting of 7000 trees in Lurë.

Since 2021 a project called Trees for Lurë planted 22793 trees within the area of the national park, restoring 15.22 ha of the forest. In 2022, Trees for Lurë established tree nursery in Fushë-Lurë and started growing saplings locally, planting first 1081 locally grown trees during 2023 planting season.

However, the future of the expanded national park is being threatened by the construction of hydro electric power plants in Zall-Gjocaj that would further cripple the already fragile ecosystem of the area.

== Gallery ==
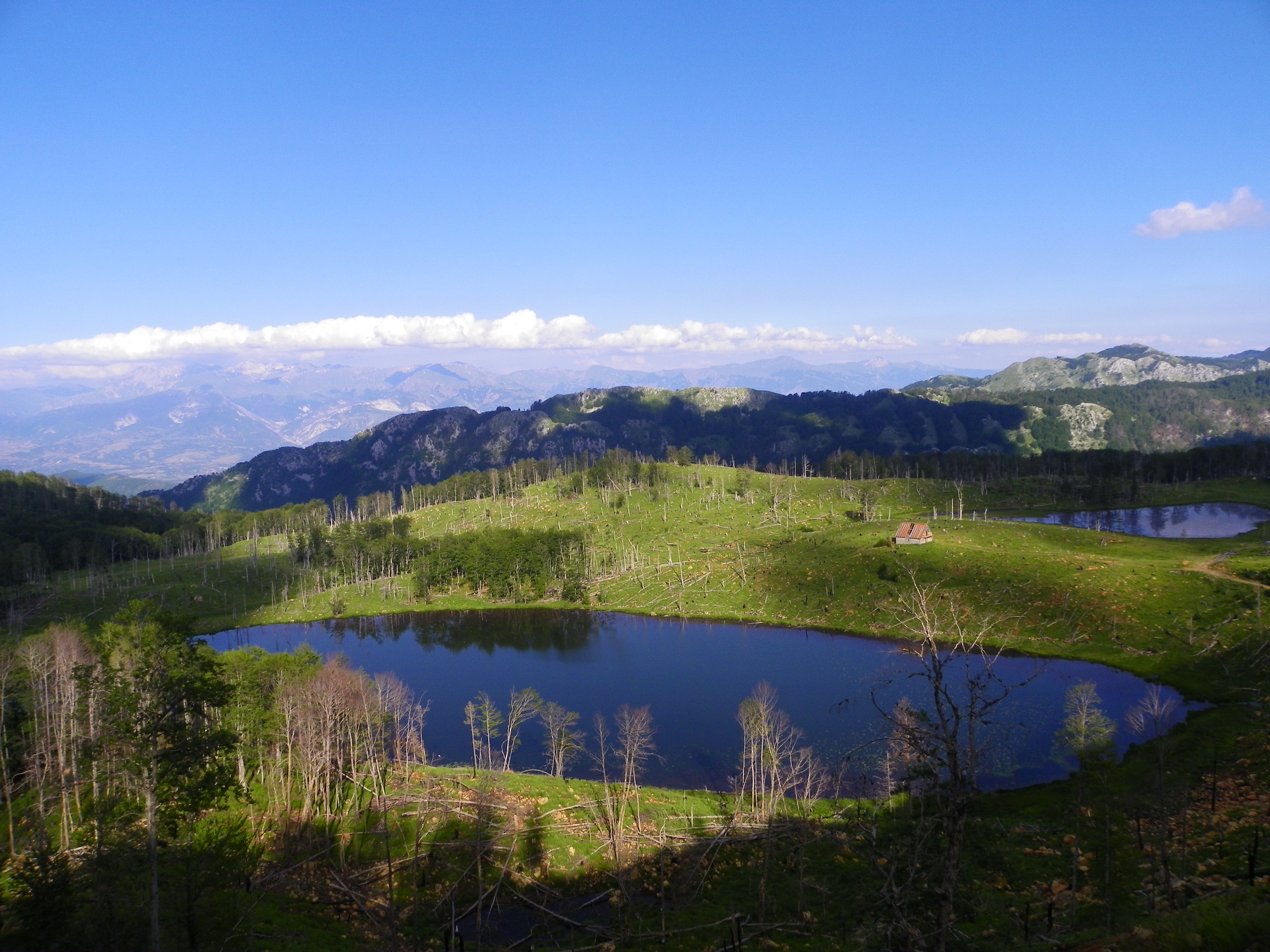
Liqeni i Kallabës. Devastation from illegal logging can be clearly seen

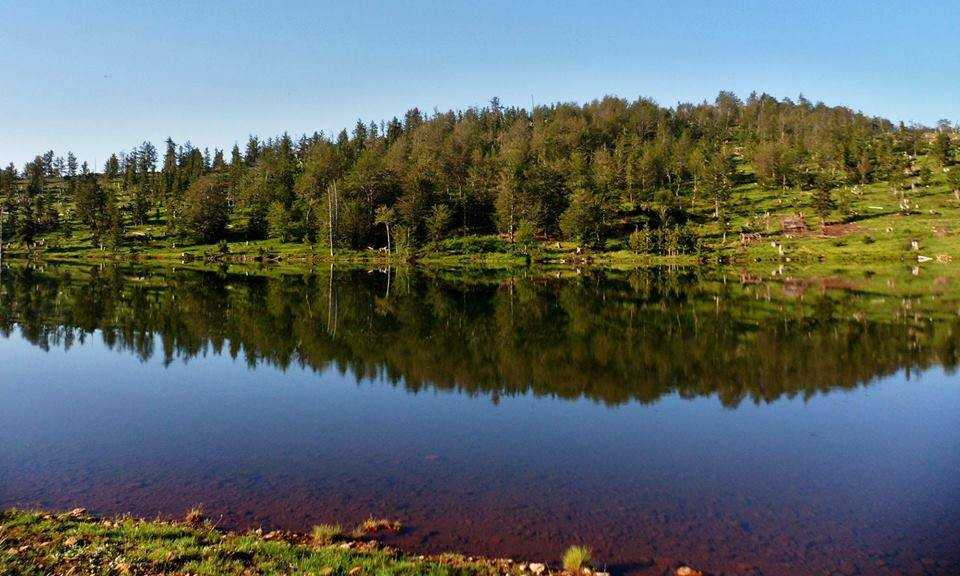
Liqeni i Lurës

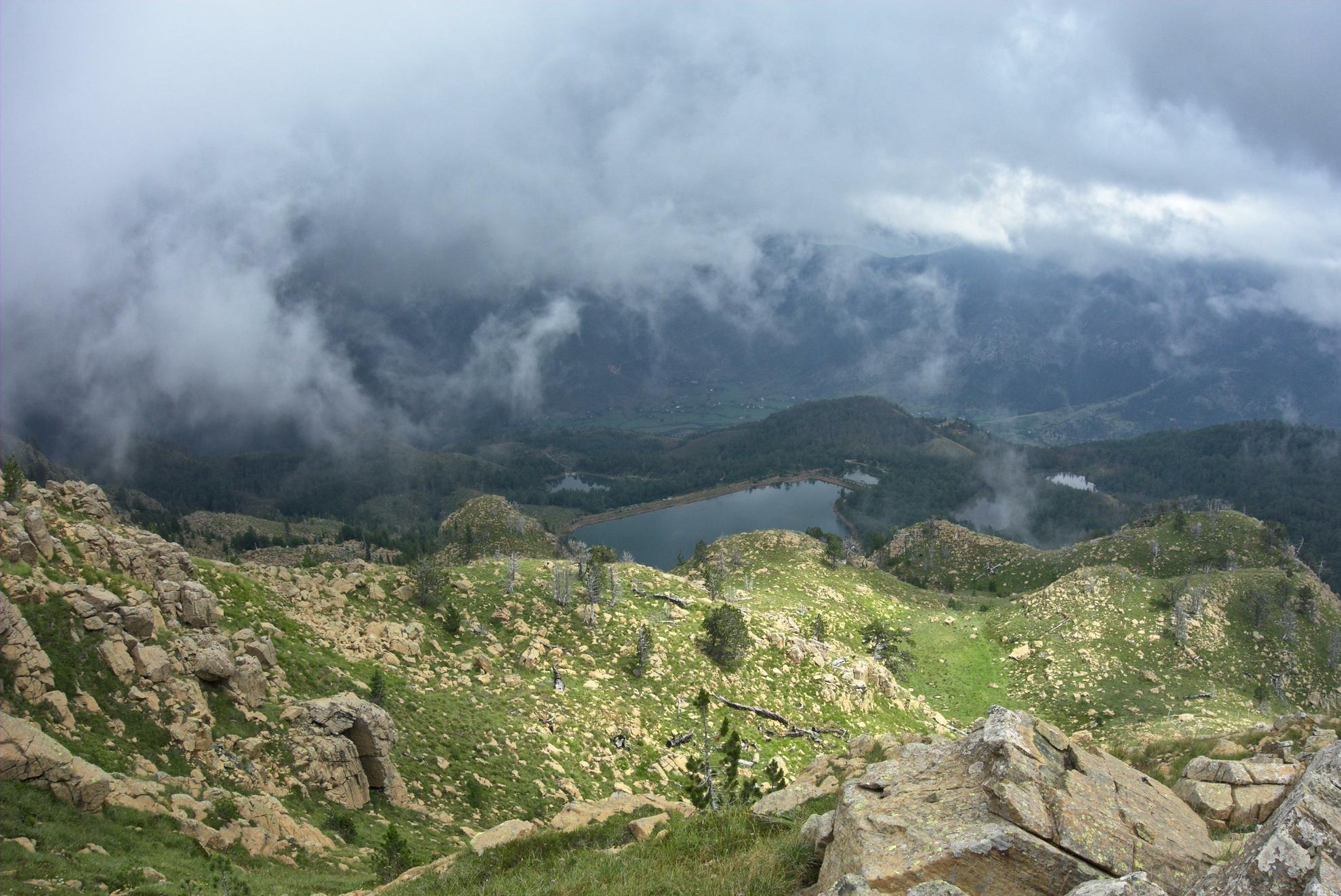
Liqeni i Madh from the top

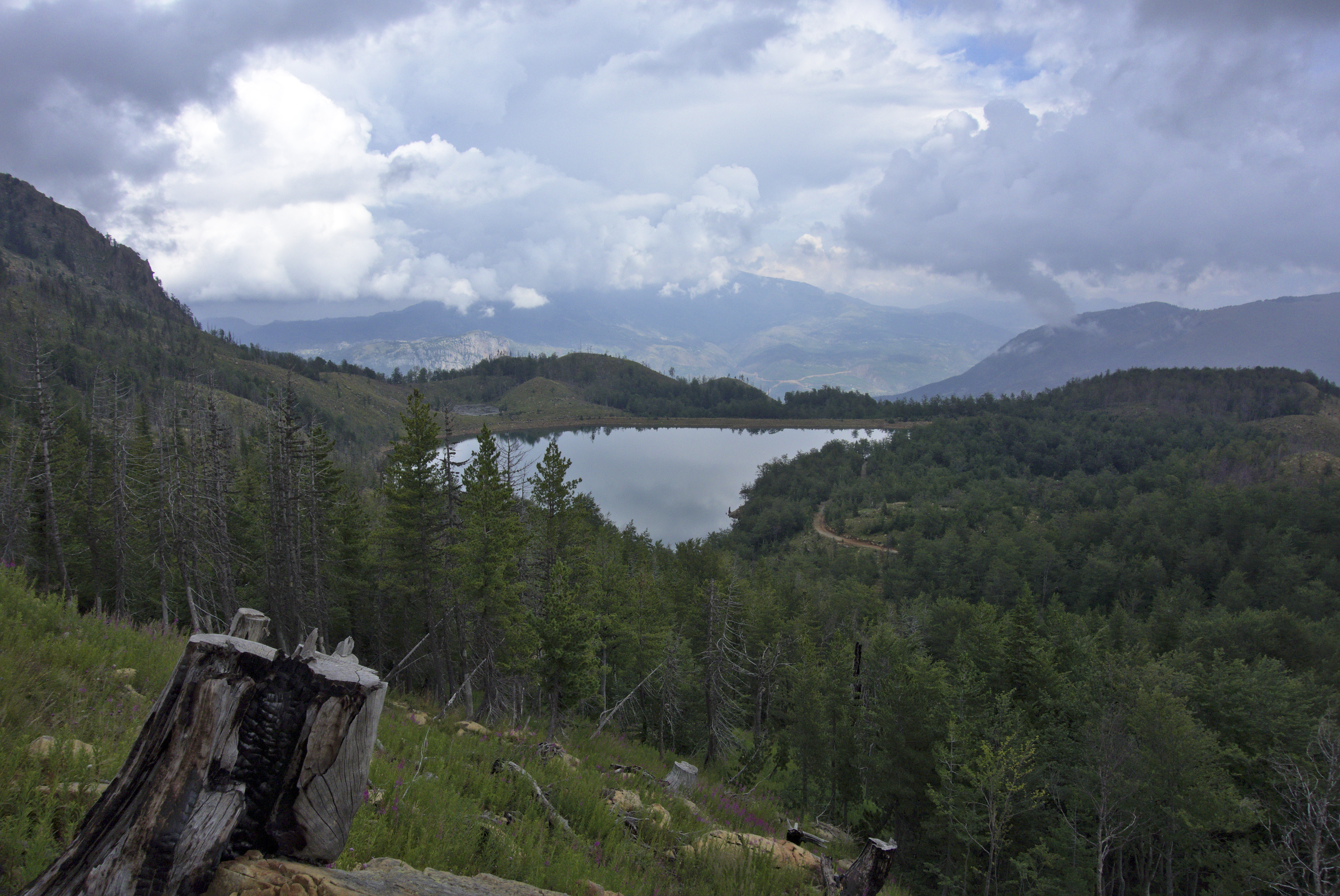
Liqeni i Madh

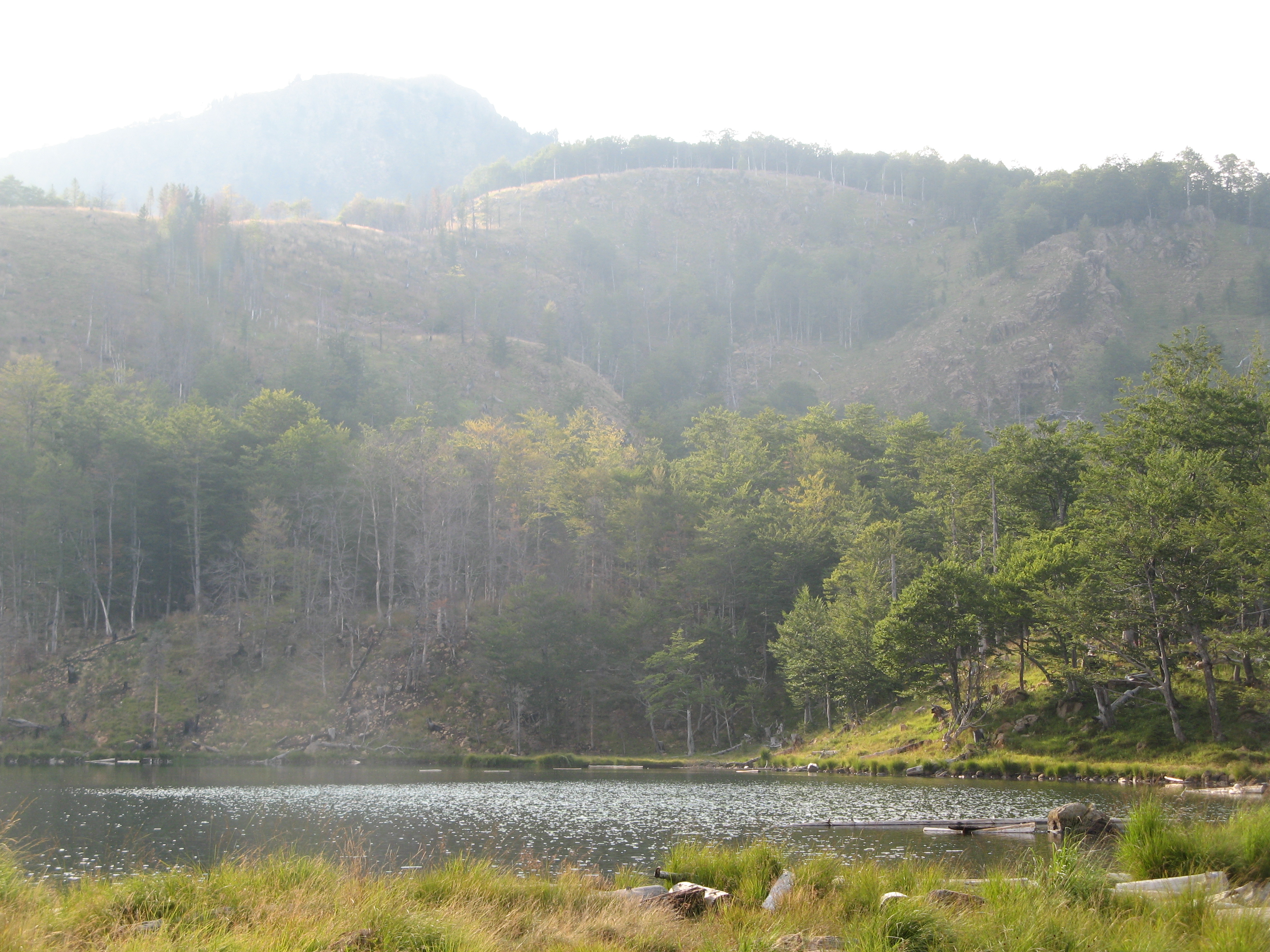
View of the lake

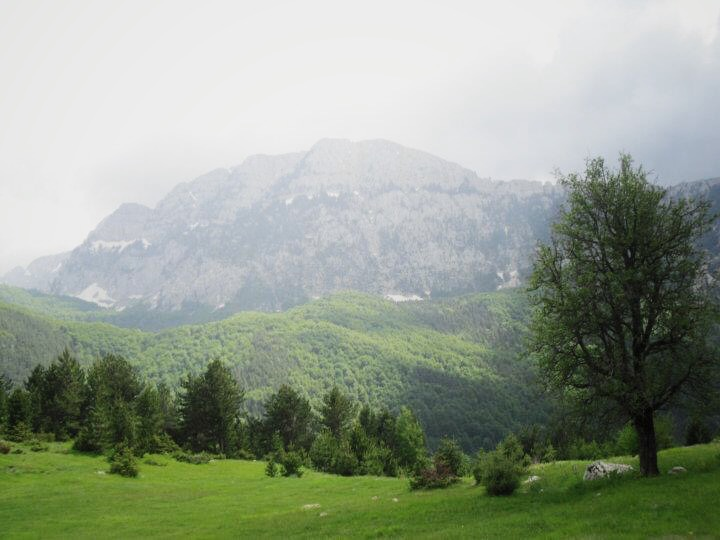
Zall-Gjocaj

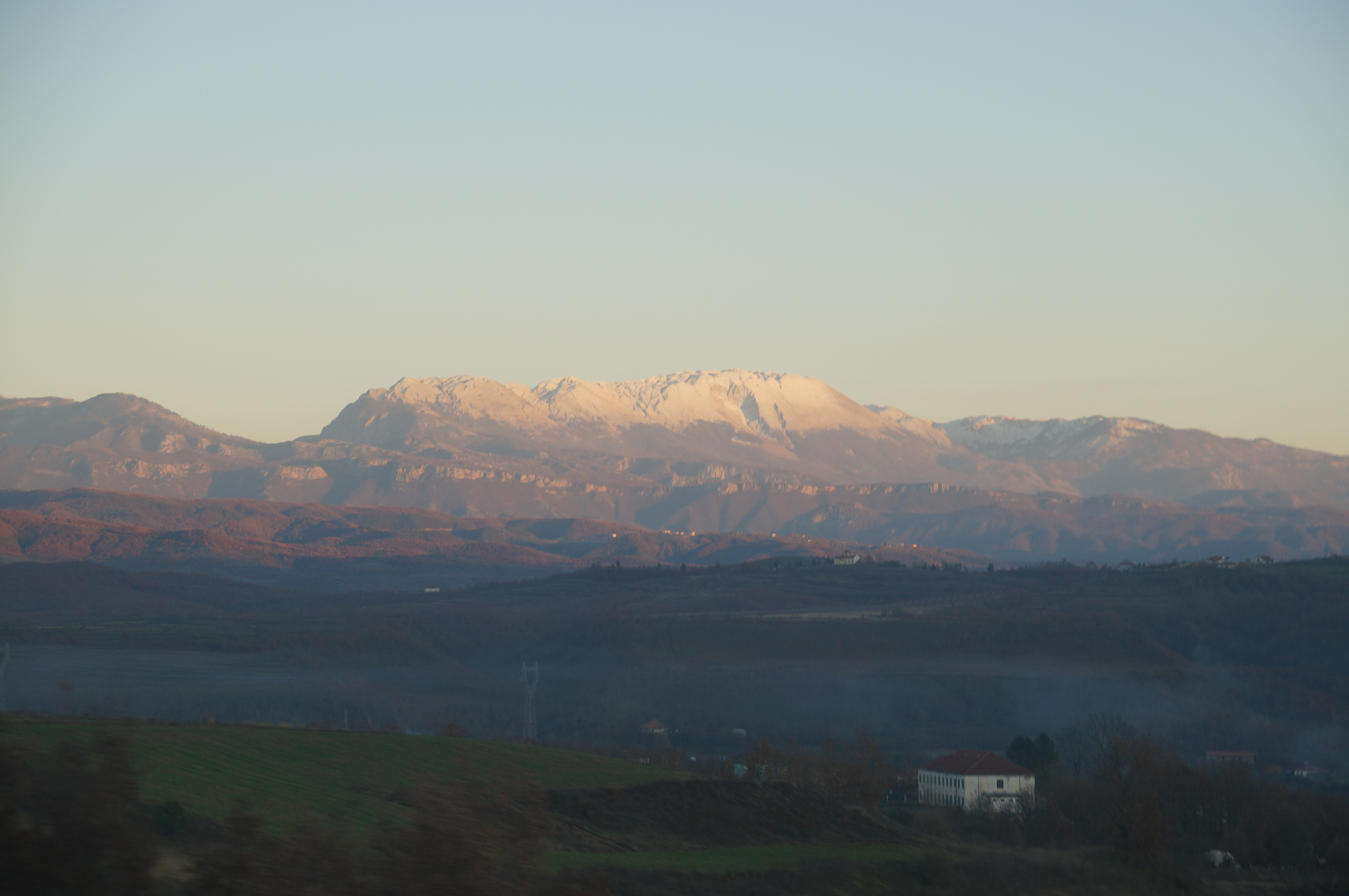
Dejes Mt

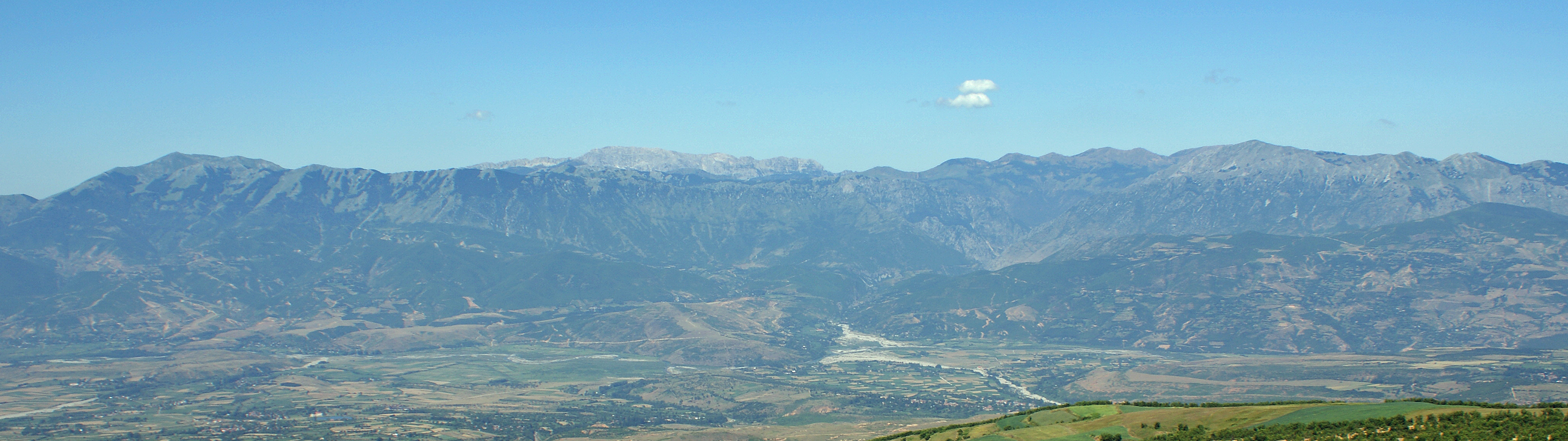
Panorama

== See also ==
- Protected areas of Albania
- Geography of Albania
- Lura Lakes
- Sope Lake, Kacnise Lakes (Liqenet e Kacnise) along Balgjajt Mt near Bulqize
- Korab-Koritnik Nature Park
- Tourism in Albania
