= Krasta mine =

Chromium mine in Krastë, Dibër County, Albania

- Location in Albania
- Location: Krastë, Dibër County, Albania; 41°25′51″N 20°12′33″E
- Products: Chromium
- Opened: 1942
- Closed: 2006

The Krasta mine is a large mine located in central east Albania, adjacent to the town of Krastë in Dibër County, 40 kilometres (25 mi) as the crow flies, east of the capital, Tirana. Krasta represents one of the largest chromium reserves in Albania and in all Europe, having estimated reserves of 2 million tonnes of ore grading 40% chromium metal.

The mine is part of the Bulqizë Massif, a 370 square kilometres (140 mi^{2}) area which has a rock thickness between 4 kilometres (2.5 mi) and 6 kilometres (3.7 mi) and contains 65 verified chromium deposits and occurrences. The deposit has been explored to depths of up to 1,300 metres (4,300 ft) and the geological reserves amount to 12 million tonnes of which 7.5 million tonnes grading over 38% chromium metal.

The Krasta mine began operating in 1963. Between 1963 and 1965 it produced chromium ore only from occurrences. In 1971 production from the mine started. The total combined chromium ore production from the mine between 1971 and 2006 amounted to 716,000 tonnes. The deepest level of the mine is the Level +400 which reaches a depth of 400 metres (1,300 ft). The chromium ore reserves of the mine are split into two categories above and below Level +400. The proven ore reserves located above the Level +400 amount to 2,000,000 tonnes of ore grading 40% chromium metal. The proven ore reserves located below the Level +400 are currently not estimated or calculated but are expected to be grading over 40% chromium metal. The mine's total reserves amount to 2 million tonnes of ore grading 40% chromium metal. Since 1999 several parts of the mine were privatised and the other were closed. In 2006, it was estimated that a total of 2 million tons chromium ore were still unexploited in the mine of Krasta, making it the 2nd after Bulqizë mine in terms of chromium reserves in Albania, while being one of the eight Albanian chromium mines to have reserves of over 1 million tonnes of chromium ore. Krasta mine is also considered to be a source of rare metals such as platinum and cobalt, nevertheless their exploitation today is inaccessible.
