= Krasta =

Krasta may refer to:

- Krasta, a mountain near Gostivar, North Macedonia
- Krastë, Dibër, a small town in east Albania
- a character in Harry Turtledove's Darkness series

== See also ==
- Krastë (disambiguation)
