= Krastë, Dibër =

Krastë
- Town
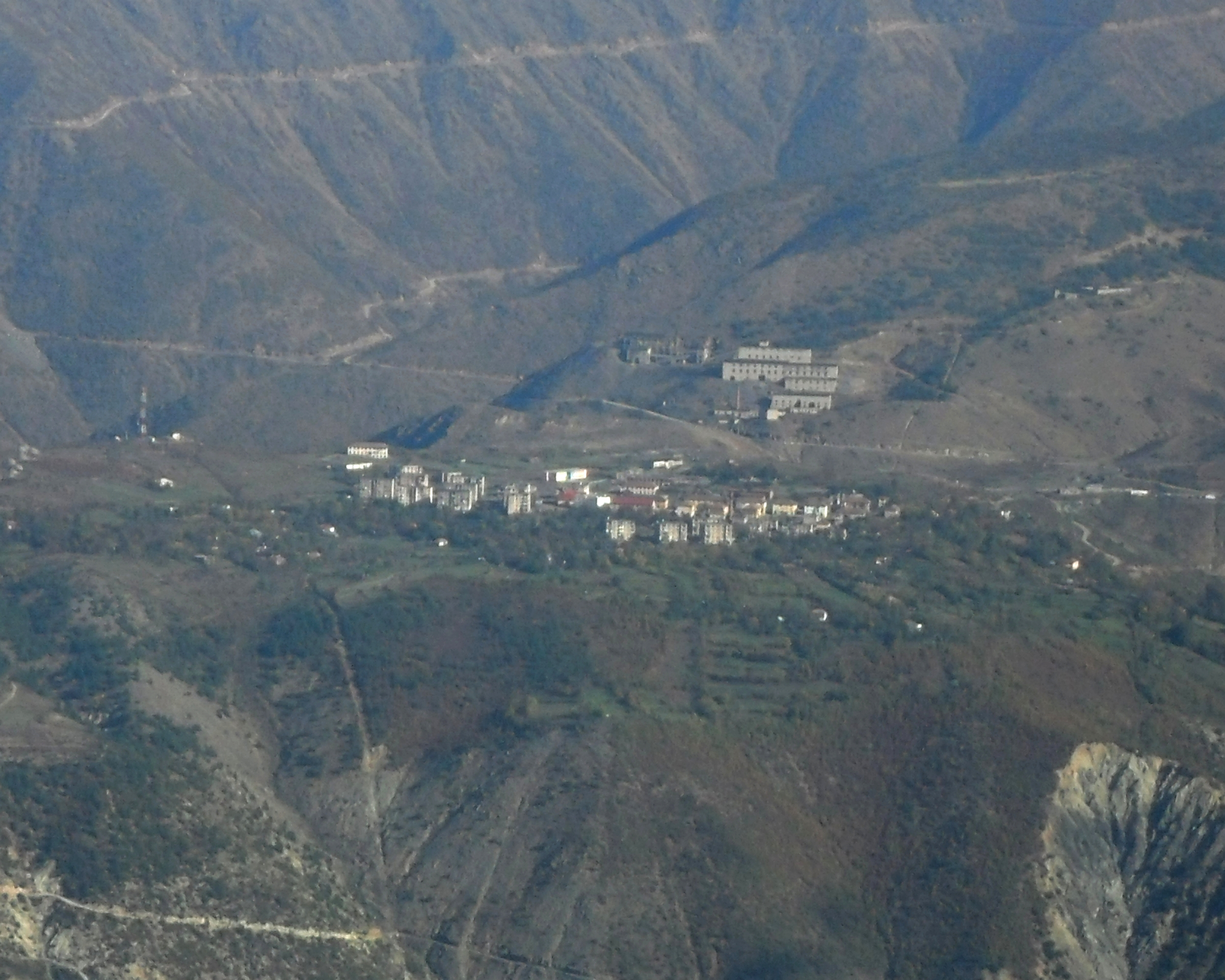
- Krastë seen from the summit of Noi i Madh (1848 m), at a distance of 7.7 km (5 mi) as the crow flies.

- Location within Albania
- Coordinates: 41°25′24″N 20°12′13″E
- Country: Albania
- County: Dibër
- Municipality: Bulqizë
- Administrative unit: Martanesh
- Elevation: 1,100 m (3,600 ft)

Population (2005)
  - Total: 1,540
- Time zone: UTC+1 (CET)
  - Summer (DST): UTC+2 (CEST)
- Postal Code: 8403

Krastë (Albanian definite form: Krasta) is a small town in Dibër County, east Albania. With a population of 2142, it is the center and only town of the municipal unit of Martanesh. At the 2015 local government reform it became part of the municipality Bulqizë. Situated on a plateau, at 1,100 m (3,609 ft) altitude, it is one of Albania's highest towns. Krastë was founded as a new mining town in 1970, mostly for the exploitation of chromium ore from the Batra mine.

== Geography and location ==
One of the smallest urban settlements of Albania, Krastë is the center of the former commune of Martanesh, in Dibër county. It lies on a plateau, on the western slope of Kalti mountain 1,592 m (5,223 ft), part of Mali i Lopës. It has an altitude of 1,100 m (3,609 ft), making it the highest town in Albania. Krastë is situated in a relatively isolated mountainous region and is 20 km far from its nearest city, Bulqizë. Krastë is almost 145 km (90 mi) by road from the capital Tirana, despite being only 40 km as the crow flies from it. It is expected that the completion of the new Arbër highway will halve the distance of the town from the capital of Albania.

== History ==
Early archaeological evidence has been found in the district of Bulqizë, especially in the villages Krajkë and Shupenzë, while a stone hammer, today exposed in the Historical Museum of Burrel, was discovered in the village of Gjon, adjacent to Krastë, suggesting that the region was inhabited from the Stone Age.

On February 25, 1965, eleven members of the Geological Expedition of Batra perished under a sudden avalanche in the creek of Batra (approximately 5 km from the site where the town of Krastë was later built), during an attempt to rescue one of their friends. The new Batra mine that began operating in 1967 was named "11 Heronjtë" (11 Heroes) in their honor.

Krastë was founded in 1970, as a new mining community for housing the workers of Batra mine, in the district of Mat. After a year, in 1971 the new Krasta mine began operating besides Krastë. The first inhabitants settled in Krastë in 1974 and the locality was slowly growing towards a small urban settlement, based on an approved urban plan. In 1979 Krastë was officially declared a town. In 1987, a chromium enrichment factory was constructed in the town. After the split of the district of Dibra in 1992, the local administration of Krastë shifted from Mat district, to the newly formed District of Bulqizë, together with the whole commune of Martanesh, and became the center of it.

== Population ==
The first citizens settled in the newly founded town of Krastë in 1974. In 2005, the population of Krastë was 1540. As of 2011, 2142 inhabitants in 477 families lived in Krastë. This constitutes 82% of Martanesh commune’s total population of 2601 inhabitants, arranged in 658 families. Despite the slight increase of the population in town, many inhabitants of the region have emigrated abroad.

== Religion ==
Citizens of Krastë and the surrounding rural areas are predominantly followers of Bektashism, while there is also a considerable catholic Christian community under the Diocese of Rrëshen, which was established on December 7, 1996 and includes the districts of Bulqizë, Dibër and Mat.

The World Headquarters of the Bektashi Order were officially established in Albania in August 1930, after the ban of all dervish orders in Turkey in autumn 1925. Albania’s Bektashi community was divided into six districts and the tekke of Krastë was the headquarters of Elbasan district. Religion was banned by the communist dictatorship of Albania in 1967 and after almost a quarter of a century, on March 22, 1990 Nowruz (Sultan Novruz Day) was celebrated again. This marked the official resurrection of Bektashism in the country and the celebrations were attended even by Mother Teresa, who visited the World Headquarters of Bektashi Order in Tirana.

Every June 29, southeast of Krastë, in the Ballenjë tekke of Martanesh, Bektashi believers from Albania and other countries come and gather in a massive pilgrimage to celebrate Balım Sultan (Albanian: Ballëm Sulltan) day, in memory of the second most important figure of the Bektashi Order.

== Economy and infrastructure ==
Despite the richness of natural resources, unemployment is high. Mining is the main sector of the town's economy, while the population relies much on remittances. Many families live in poverty; 32.4 percent of families in the Commune of Martanesh are in receipt of economic assistance. In January 1998, Krasta’s water infrastructure benefited from a fund of 600 million Leks that were allocated by then Ministry of Construction and Public Affairs for the construction of 43 water supply facilities.

=== Mining ===
Chromium exploitation was one of the most important branches of the centralized economy of People's Socialist Republic of Albania until the early 1990s. In 1980s, Albania was a leading world producer and exporter of chromite and was often ranked second in terms of export (behind South Africa) and third for production (behind South Africa and former Soviet Union).

It is considered that mineral reserves of Krasta mine contain rare metals such as cobalt and platinum, whose exploitation today is inaccessible. After 1999, four mining leases were given by the Albanian government for chromium exploitation in some galleries of the Krasta mine. In 2006, it was estimated that 2 million tons chromium ore remained unexploited in the town's mine, making the Krasta mine second only to the Bulqizë mine in terms of Albania's chromium reserves.
