= Balgjaj =

Mountain in Albania

- Mali i Balgjajt
- Location within Albania

Highest point
- Elevation: 2,101 m (6,893 ft)
- Prominence: 1,141 m (3,743 ft)
- Isolation: 4.2 km (2.6 mi)
- Listing: Ribu
- Coordinates: 41°31′58″N 20°12′56″E

Geography
- Country: Albania
- Region: Central Mountain Region
- Municipality: Klos
- Parent range: Lura Mountains

Geology
- Mountain type: massif
- Rock type: ultrabasic rock

Balgjaj is a massif in east-central Albania, located in Klos municipality. Its highest summit, Maja e Kreshtës, rises to an elevation of 2,101 m (6,893 ft). The mountain is situated between the Burrel Basin to the west and Mali i Homeshit (1,992 m) to the east. To the southeast, Qafa e Buallit and the Bulqizë Valley separate it from Mali i Lopës (1,774 m), while Qafë Murra to the northwest forms the boundary with Mali i Dejës (2,246 m).

== Geology ==
Balgjaj is composed predominantly of ultrabasic rocks, forming a large and compact massif. Its relief is strongly dissected and characterized by several prominent peaks, including Miceku (2,100 m), Maja e Gurrave të Zeza (2,079 m) and Maja e Arnishtës (2,073 m).

Glacial processes have played a significant role in shaping the mountain ridge, resulting in the formation of cirques, glacial troughs and morainic ridges. Approximately 15 glacial lakes are found within these landforms, varying in size from a few square meters to about 1.5 hectares, the largest being Liqeni i Zi. Most of the lakes are concentrated in the northern and central parts of the ridge.

== Biodiversity ==
Surface water drainage is well developed and is largely fed by the glacial lakes. The western slope of the mountain is steeper than the eastern slope. Natural vegetation is relatively dense and is dominated by oak and beech forest communities.

== See also ==
- List of mountains in Albania
