= Krastë =

Krastë or Krasta may refer to:

- Krastë, Berat, a village in southern Albania
- Krastë, Dibër, a town in northeastern Albania

== See also ==
- Krastë (disambiguation)
