= Sopa =

Sopa or SOPA may refer to:

- Sopa (tribe), an Albanian tribe of the Sharr Mountains
- Lake Sopa, Albania
- School of Performing Arts Seoul, an arts high school in Seoul, South Korea
- Senior Officer Present Afloat, a term used in the U.S. Navy
- Socialist Party of Azania, a political party in South Africa
- Stop Online Piracy Act, a controversial proposed legislation introduced in the U.S. Senate regarding copyright infringement on the Internet
- Sydney Olympic Park Authority, the managers of Sydney Olympic Park
- Society of Publishers in Asia, a non-profit organization founded in 1982 in Hong Kong

== See also ==
- Sopaipilla, a kind of fried bread
- Sopas, a Filipino creamy macaroni soup
- Soda (disambiguation)
- Soap (disambiguation)
