= Tekke of Martanesh =

Bektashi tekke in Martanesh, Albania

- Teqeja e Martaneshit
- Location of the tekke in Albania

Religion
- Affiliation: Sunni Islam
- Sect: Sufism
- Rite: Bektashi
- Ecclesiastical or organizational status: Tekke
- Status: Active

Location
- Location: Martanesh, Dibër County
- Country: Albania
- Interactive map of Tekke of Martanesh
- Coordinates: 41°22′35″N 20°16′09″E

Architecture
- Type: Islamic architecture
- Style: Ottoman
- Completed: 1870 CE

Cultural Monument of Albania
- Official name: Tekke of Martanesh

The Tekke of Martanesh (Albanian: Teqeja e Martaneshit), also known as the Peshku Teqe (Teqeja e Peshkut), is a tekke, located in Martanesh, Dibër County of Albania. Completed in 1870 CE, the tekke was designated as a Cultural Monument of Albania.

== See also ==
- Islam in Albania
- List of Religious Cultural Monuments of Albania
