= Villages of Dibër County =

The Dibër County in northeastern Albania is subdivided into 4 municipalities. These municipalities contain 285 towns and villages:
