= Lura Lakes =

Glacial lakes in Albania

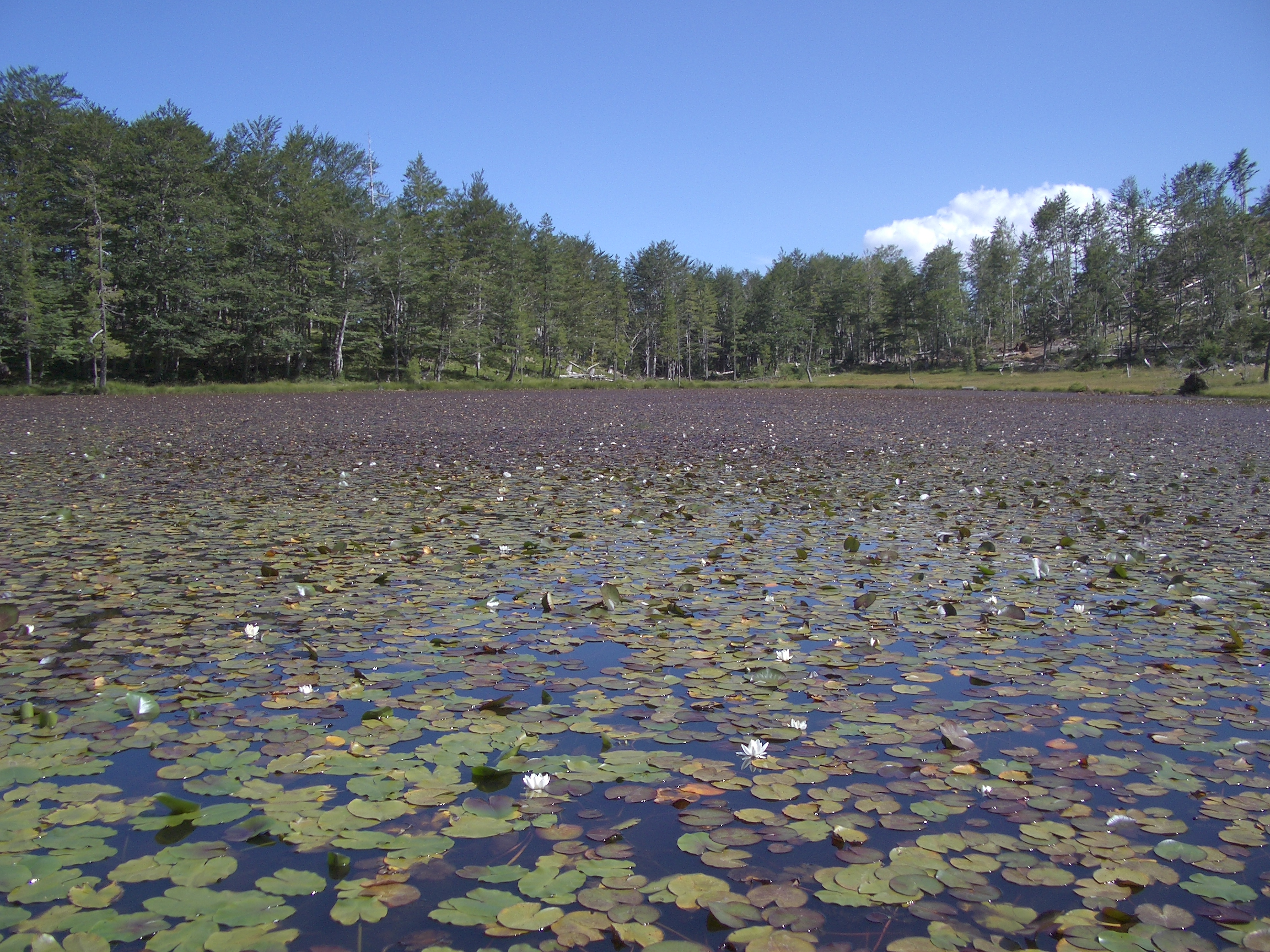
Liqeni i Luleve is covered with water lilies and brandy bottles.

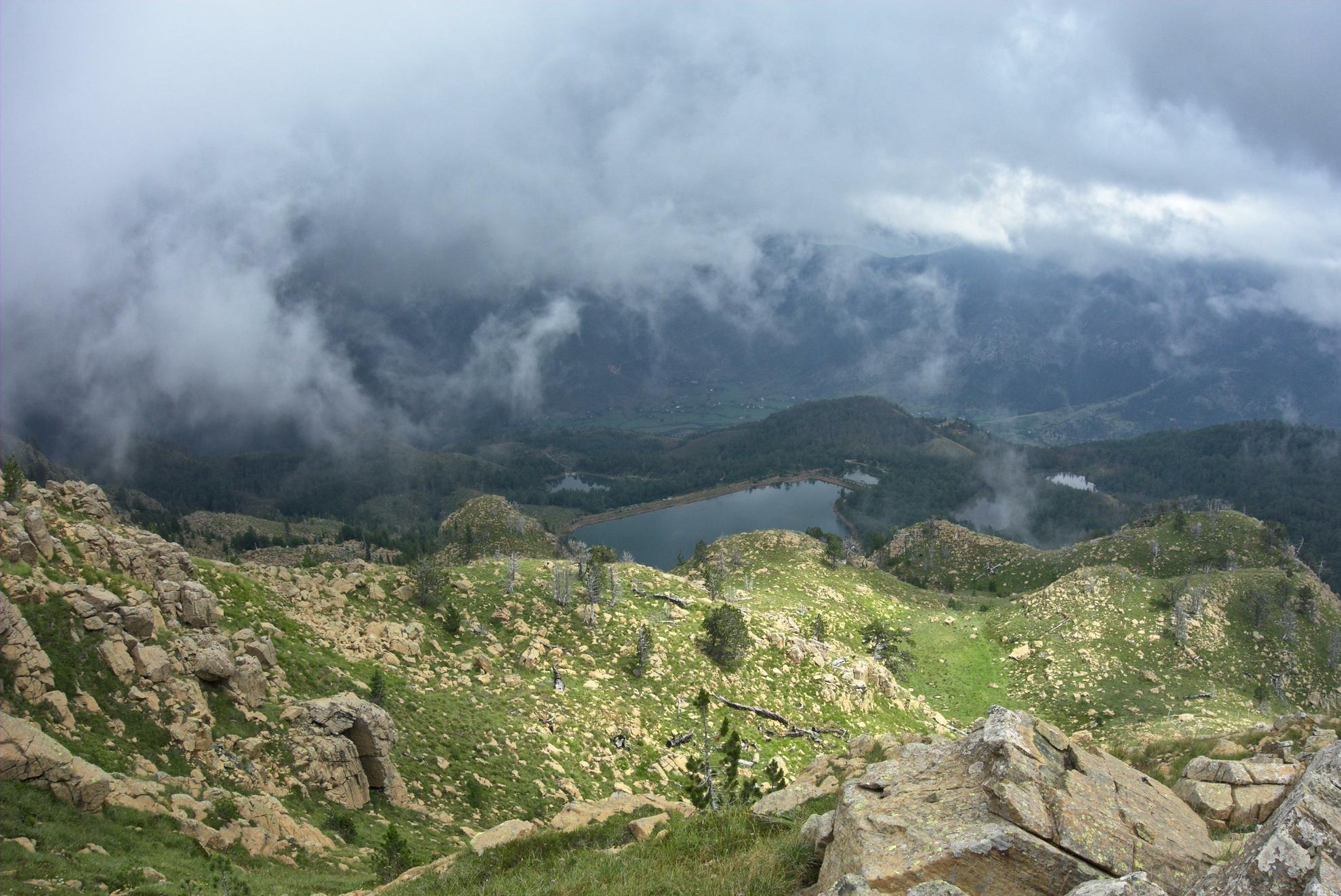
Liqeni i Madh has a length of 423 metres and a width of 300 metres.

The Lura Lakes (Albanian: Liqenet e Lurës) are a group of lakes of glacial origin, situated in the eastern Lura Mountains and Lurë National Park in Albania. The lakes are renowned for their distinctive colors, ranging from azure to green, grey or blue.

Currently, 12 lakes can be seen from the surface. The lakes are situated between 1,500 and 1,700 metres elevation above sea level. Each lake carries a name associated with its most characteristic feature.

Albanian name	Altitude	Area	Depth	Notes
Liqeni i Luleve	1,585 m (5,200 ft)	1.44 ha (3.6 acres)	0.8 m (2 ft 7 in)	The lake is covered with water lilies and brandy bottles.
Liqeni i Zi	1,620 m (5,310 ft)	2.5 ha (6.2 acres)	10 m (33 ft)	
Liqeni i Madh	1,722 m (5,650 ft)	3.6 ha (8.9 acres)	20 m (66 ft)	
Liqeni i Kallabës	1,575 m (5,167 ft)	12 ha (30 acres)	20 m (66 ft)	
Liqeni i Rasave	1,600 m (5,200 ft)	0.4 ha (0.99 acres)	2.5 m (8 ft 2 in)	
Liqeni i Hotit	1,500 m (4,900 ft)	1.84 ha (4.5 acres)	3 m (9.8 ft)	
Liqeni i Kalatës	1,500 m (4,900 ft)	3.6 ha (8.9 acres)	12 m (39 ft)	

== See also ==
- Kunora e Lurës
- Lurë National Park
- Geography of Albania
- Lakes of Albania
