= Batra mine =

Chromium mine in Bulqizë, Dibër County, Albania

- Location in Albania

Location
- Location: Bulqizë, Dibër County, Albania; 41°29′30″N 20°13′19″E

Production
- Products: Chromium

History
- Opened: 1967

The Batra mine is a large chromium mine located in central Albania in Dibër County, 40 kilometres (25 mi) east of the capital, Tirana. Batra represents one of the largest chromium reserve in Albania and one of the largest in Europe, having estimated reserves of 0.73 million tonnes of ore grading 38% chromium metal. The mine is part of the Bulqizë Massif, a 370 square kilometres (140 mi^{2}) area which has a rock thickness between 4 kilometres (2.5 mi) and 6 kilometres (3.7 mi) and contains 65 verified chromium deposits and occurrences. The deposit has been explored to depths of up to 1,560 metres (5,120 ft) and the geological reserves amount to 12 million tonnes of which 7.5 million tonnes grading over 38% chromium metal.

The Batra mine began operating in 1967. Between 1964 and 1967 it produced chromium ore only from occurrences. In 1967 production from the mine started. The total combined chromium ore production from the mine between 1967 and 2006 amounted to 5,561,000 tonnes. The deepest level of the mine is the Level +1560 which reaches a depth of 1,560 metres (5,120 ft). The chromium ore reserves of the mine are split into two categories above and below Level +1560. The proven ore reserves located above the Level +1560 amount to 730,000 tonnes of ore grading 38% chromium metal. The proven ore reserves located below the Level +1560 are currently not estimated or calculated but are expected to be grading 45% chromium metal. The mine was privatised in 1999.
