= Runja =

Summit in Albania

- Maja e Runjës
- Location within Albania

Highest point
- Elevation: 2,036 m (6,680 ft)
- Prominence: 539 m (1,768 ft)
- Isolation: 8.5 km (5.3 mi)
- Coordinates: 41°31′58″N 20°12′56″E

Geography
- Country: Albania
- Region: Central Mountain Region
- Municipality: Klos
- Parent range: Lura Mountains

Geology
- Rock age: Triassic
- Mountain type: mountain peak
- Rock type: limestone

Runja is a summit in the Lura Mountains range, located in Dibër municipality, east-central Albania. Rising to an elevation of 2,036 m (6,680 ft) above sea level, it forms part of the rugged mountainous relief of the interior Albanian highlands.

== Geology ==
Maja e Runjës is positioned between several important landforms and valleys. It lies between Mali i Dejës to the north, the valley of Murra stream to the south, the Black Drin Valley to the east and the gorge of Seta stream to the west. This setting places it at the junction of multiple drainage basins.

Composed almost entirely of Triassic limestone, the mountain has the form of a pyramidal ridge, which continues westward toward Maja e Madhe (1,795 m). Its southern and eastern slopes descend very steeply into the valley of Murra stream, while the eastern slope descends more gently toward the valley of the Black Drin.

Long-term karstification and tectonic deformation have shaped its slopes and ridgelines.

== Biodiversity ==
Evidence of past glaciation is preserved in the form of glacial cirques on the western and northwestern slopes. These areas are covered by dense beech forests, particularly on the western and northern sides. By contrast, the southern and eastern slopes are largely deforested and support only sparse vegetation.

== See also ==
- List of mountains in Albania
