= Martanesh =

- Administrative unit
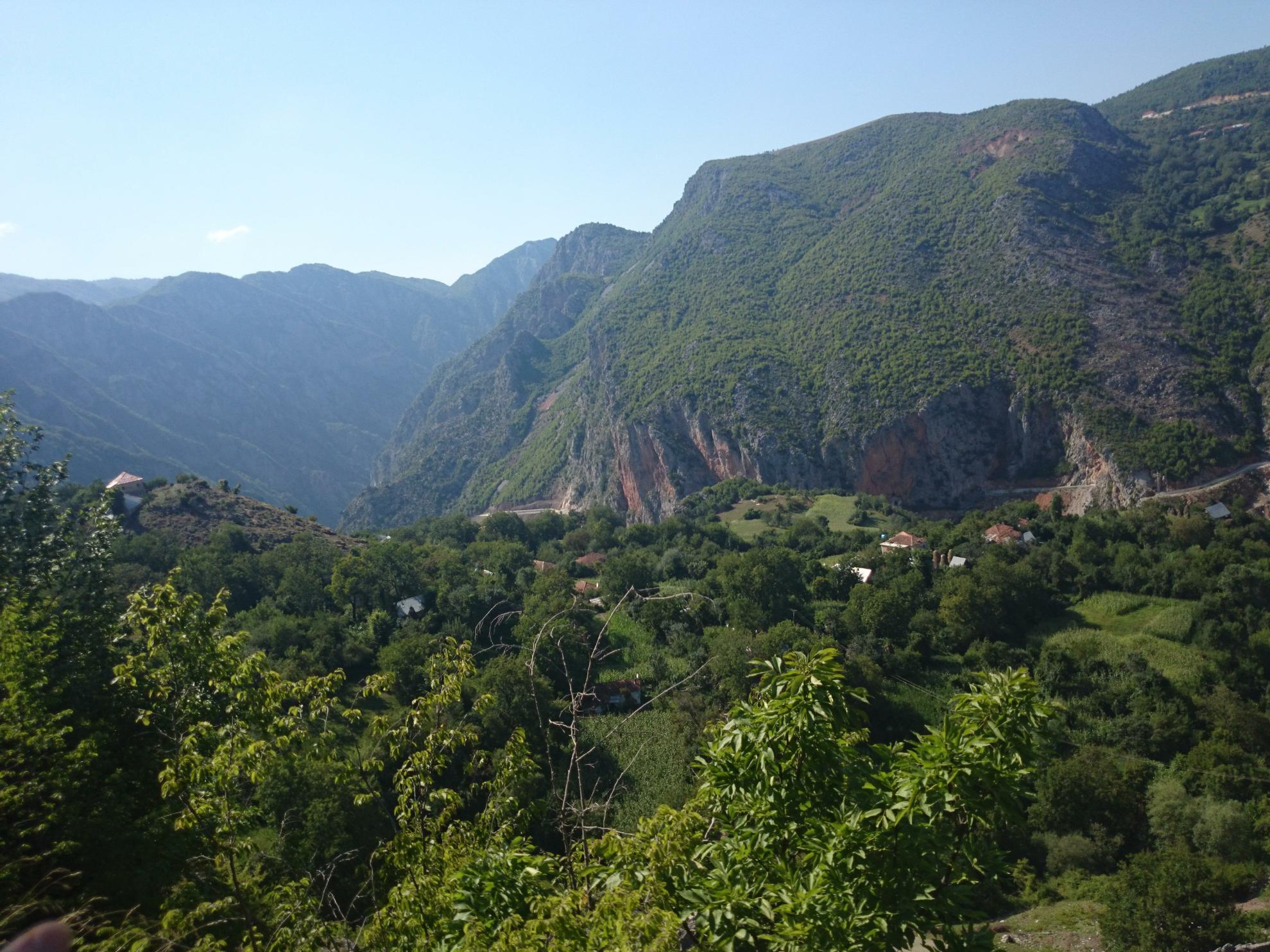
- Martanesh village

- Location within Albania
- Coordinates: 41°23′N 20°14′E
- Country: Albania
- County: Dibër
- Municipality: Bulqizë
  - Administrative unit: 169.2 km^{2} (65.3 sq mi)

Population (2011)
  - Administrative unit: 1,836
  - Administrative unit density: 10.85/km^{2} (28.10/sq mi)
- Time zone: UTC+1 (CET)
  - Summer (DST): UTC+2 (CEST)
- Postal Code: 8403

Martanesh (Albanian: Martaneshi) is a geographic and ethnographic region within the Dibër County in eastern Albania. Formerly a commune, at the 2015 local government reform it became a subdivision of the municipality Bulqizë. The population at the 2011 census was 1,836. The settlement holding the status of town is Krastë, which was also the center of the commune. The population is largely Bektashi with a rather small Catholic minority, and the commune contains the Teqe of Martanesh.

== History ==
Martanesh is recorded in the Ottoman defter of 1467 as a hass-ı mir-liva settlement in the vilayet of Mati. Although the register's complete survey on the village is missing, the following household heads are attested: Pal Rusi, Gjon Liti, Martin Dajxhi, Peter Mirneli, Pelgrin Zaboli, Todor Rusi, Benk Titko, Andrija Çukali, Peter Rusi, Gjon Zhaboli, Ariza Kuqi, Peter Kurpendi, Pelgrin Kurpendi, Gjergj Stepani, Gjon Skani, Andrija Pisha, Gjon Stipani, Lala Pisha, Ilia Manisi, Todor Mani, Dom Lishi, Dom Todori, Gjon Todori, Todor Inboliti, Tanush Gjon Skulja, Nikolla Rusi, and Lazar. The register records that the village was exempt from paying the haraç tax. Later records show the Vorpsi family also had links and past roots in Martanesh, having had some settlements there before being in mainland Tirana. Shyqyriu Vorpsi was a Partisan along with Baba Faja Martaneshi.

== Notable people ==
- Baba Faja Martaneshi
