= Mali i Lopës =

Mountain in Albania

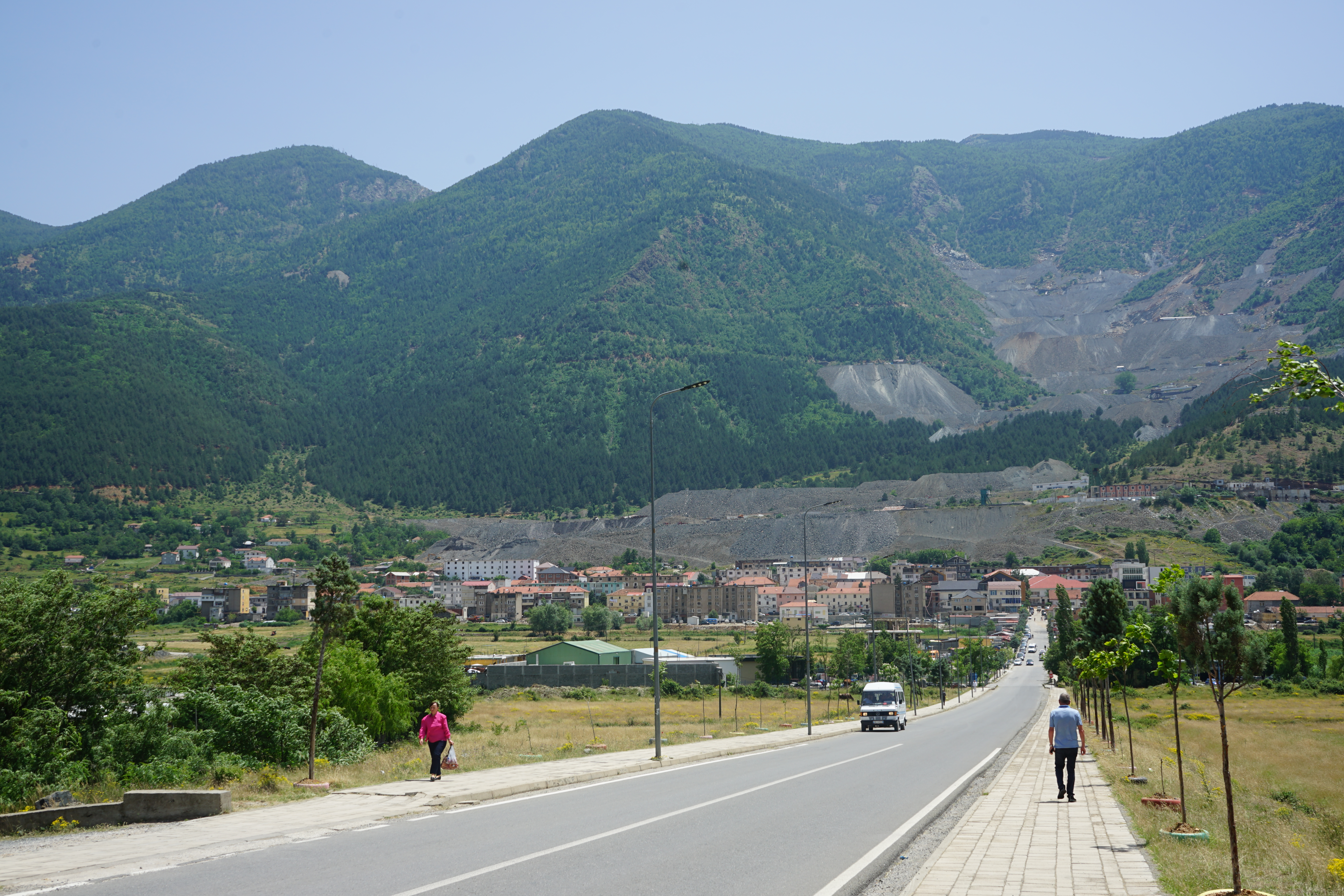
- Mali i Lopës overlooking the town of Bulqizë

Highest point
- Elevation: 2,012 m (6,601 ft)
- Prominence: 65 m (213 ft)
- Isolation: 1.4 km (0.87 mi)
- Coordinates: 41°27′56″N 20°14′15″E

Naming
- English translation: Cow's Mountain

Geography
- Location within Albania
- Country: Albania
- Region: Central Mountain Region
- Municipality: Dibër, Mat
- Parent range: Martanesh Highlands

Geology
- Rock age: Mesozoic
- Mountain type: massif
- Rock type(s): limestone, magmatic rock

Mali i Lopës (lit. 'Cow's Mountain') is a mountain located in east-central Albania, on the border between Dibër and Mat municipalities. Its highest peak, Maja e Dhoksit, reaches a height of 2,012 m (6,601 ft). It is surrounded by the valleys of Zalli i Bulqizës to the north, Zalli i Okshtunit to the east, Kaptina e Martaneshit to the south and the upper valley of Mat to the west.

== Geology ==
The mountain mass is primarily made up of ultrabasic magmatic rocks and partially of Mesozoic limestones with a gentle relief. The northern and northeastern slopes are marked by glacial cirques, some of which have transformed into glacial lakes, including Liqeni i Zi and Lake Sopa, which are among the largest of their kind in the country. The area is rich in vegetation, including oak, beech, and alpine pastures. In the Bulqiza massif are found significant sources of chrome ores (Bulqizë, Batër and Thekën).

== See also ==
- List of mountains in Albania
