= Bulqizë mine =

Chromium mine in Dibër, Albania

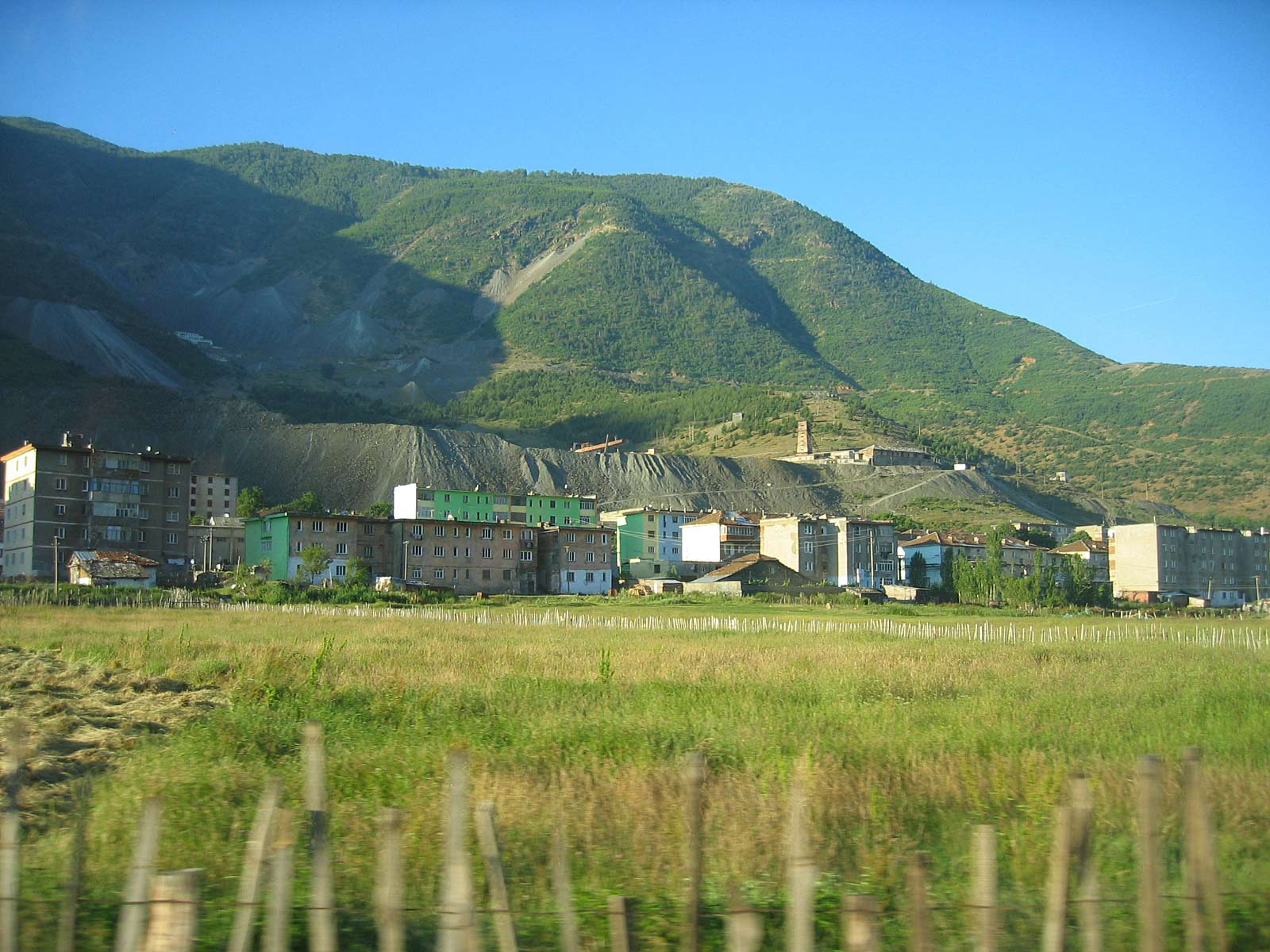
- Bulqizë mine and town

- Location in Albania

Location
- Location: Bulqizë, Dibër County, Albania; 41°29′05″N 020°12′14″E

Production
- Products: Chromium

History
- Opened: 1942

Owner
- Company: Empire Mining Corporation

The Bulqizë mine is a large mine located in central Albania in Dibër County, 40 kilometres (25 mi) east of the capital, Tirana. Bulqizë represents the largest chromium reserve in Albania and one of the largest in Europe, having estimated reserves of 2.82 million tonnes of ore grading 45.83% chromium metal. The mine is part of the Bulqizë Massif, a 370 square kilometres (140 mi^{2}) area which has a rock thickness between 4 kilometres (2.5 mi) and 6 kilometres (3.7 mi) and contains 65 verified chromium deposits and occurrences. The deposit has been explored to depths of up to 1,300 metres (4,300 ft) and the geological reserves amount to 12 million tonnes, of which 7.5 million tonnes grading over 38% chromium metal.

The Bulqizë mine began operating in 1942. Between 1942 and 1944 it produced chromium ore only from occurrences. In 1948 production from the mine started. The total combined chromium ore production from the mine between 1948 and 2006 amounted to 13,075,500 tonnes. The deepest level of the mine is the Level XVI which reaches a depth of 440 metres (1,440 ft). The chromium ore reserves of the mine are split into two categories above and below Level XVI. The proven ore reserves located above the Level XVI amount to 690,000 tonnes of ore grading 46.75% chromium metal. The proven ore reserves located below the Level XVI amount to 2,126,800 tonnes of ore grading 44.91% chromium metal. The mine's total reserves amount to 2.82 million tonnes of ore grading 45.83% chromium metal. Since 2001 the mine has been owned by the Canadian company Empire Mining Corporation. The Bulqizë mine is one of the eight Albanian chromium mines to have reserves of over 1 million tonnes of chromium ore.

In February 2024, it was revealed that a massive natural hydrogen reservoir was discovered deep beneath the Bulqizë mine. The reservoir, found within ancient oceanic crust, emits significant quantities of hydrogen gas, potentially offering a clean energy source. Research suggests at least 220 tons of high-quality hydrogen escape annually from the mine, making it one of the largest natural hydrogen flow rates recorded.
