= Kunora e Lurës =

Mountain in northern Albania

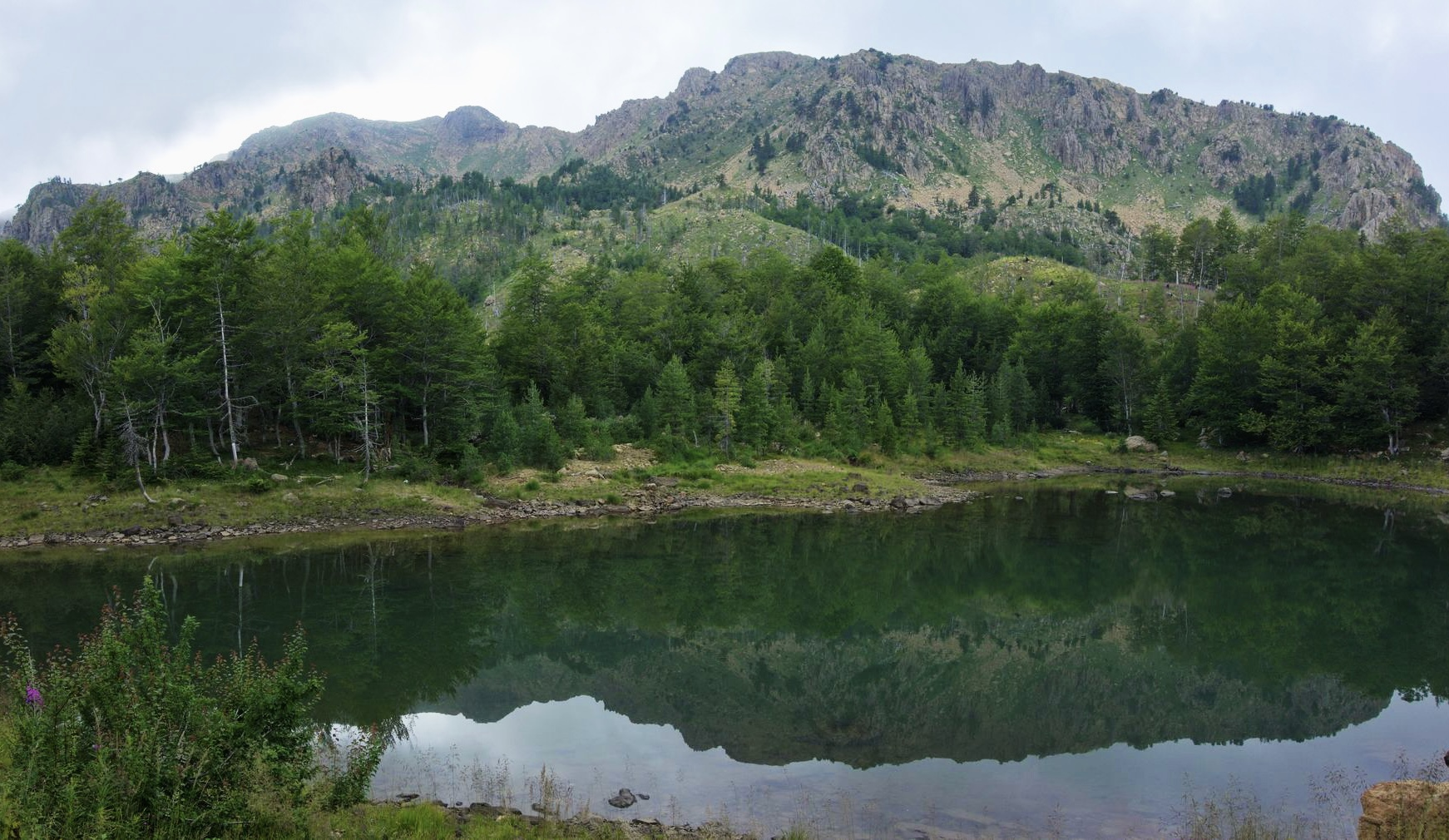
- View of Kunora e Lurës

Highest point
- Elevation: 2,119 m (6,952 ft)
- Coordinates: 41°47′9″N 20°10′53″E

Geography
- Location within Albania
- Location: Albania

Kunora e Lurës is a mountain in Albania. Kunora e Lurës reaches a height of 2,119 m (6,952 ft) above sea level and is the highest peak in the Lurë Mountains in Lurë National Park. Kunora e Lurës has a rocky face and is included in the Lura National Park, which was established in 1966. On average Kunora e Lurës has 1-1.5 m of snow on it, rarely going up to 2 m (7 ft).
