= Dibër County =

County in northern Albania

Dibër County Qarku i Dibrës (Albanian)
- County
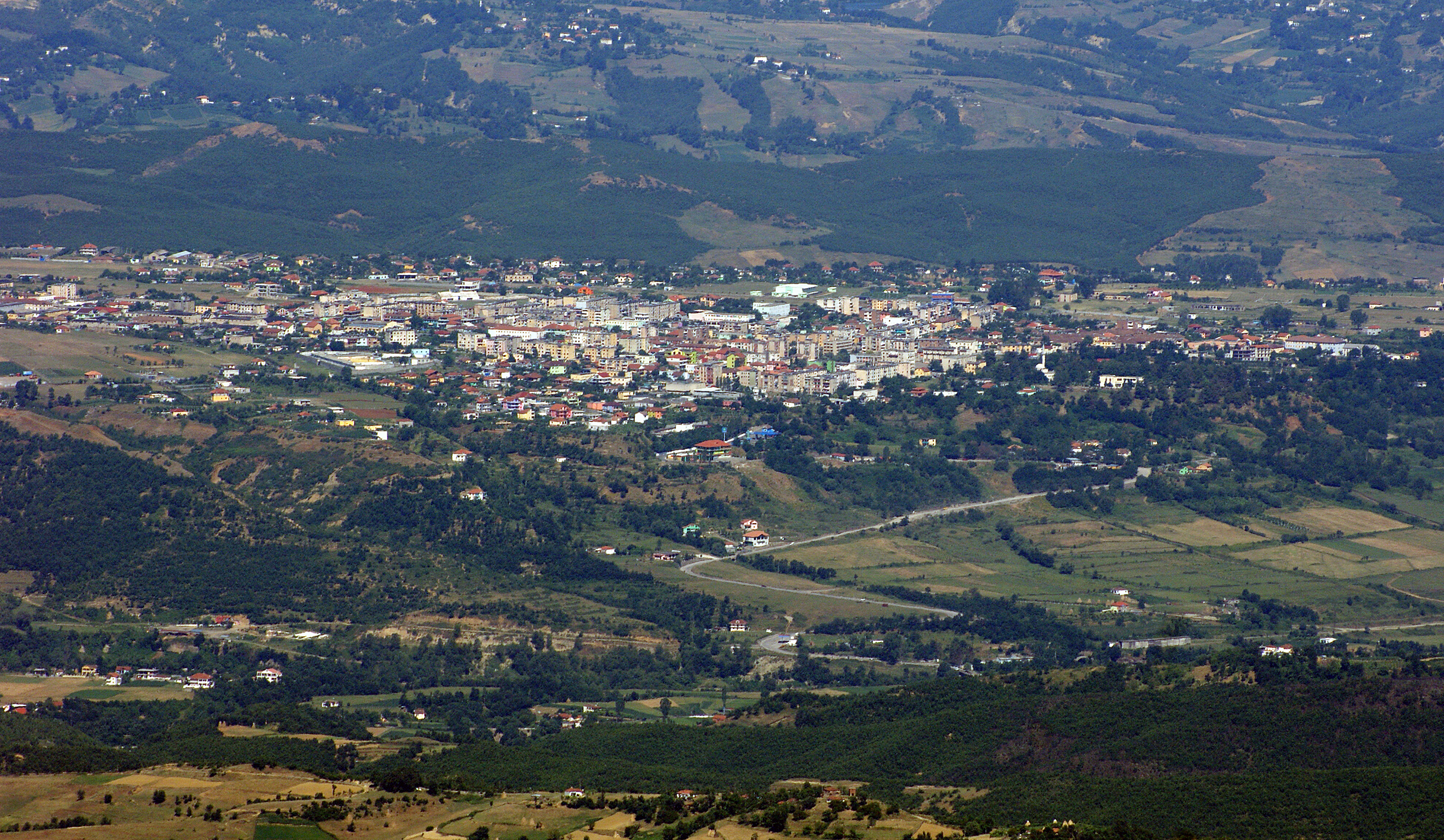
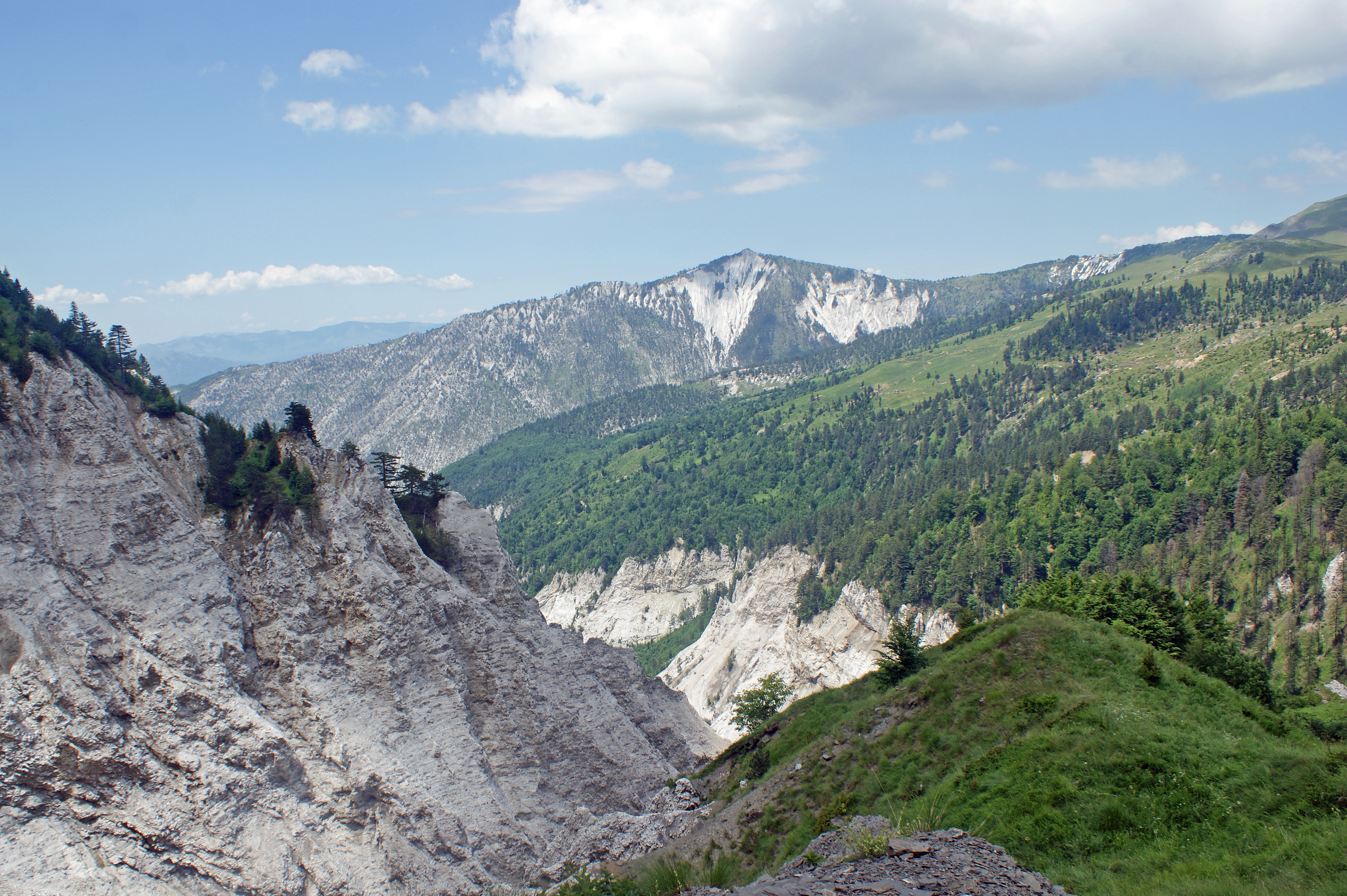
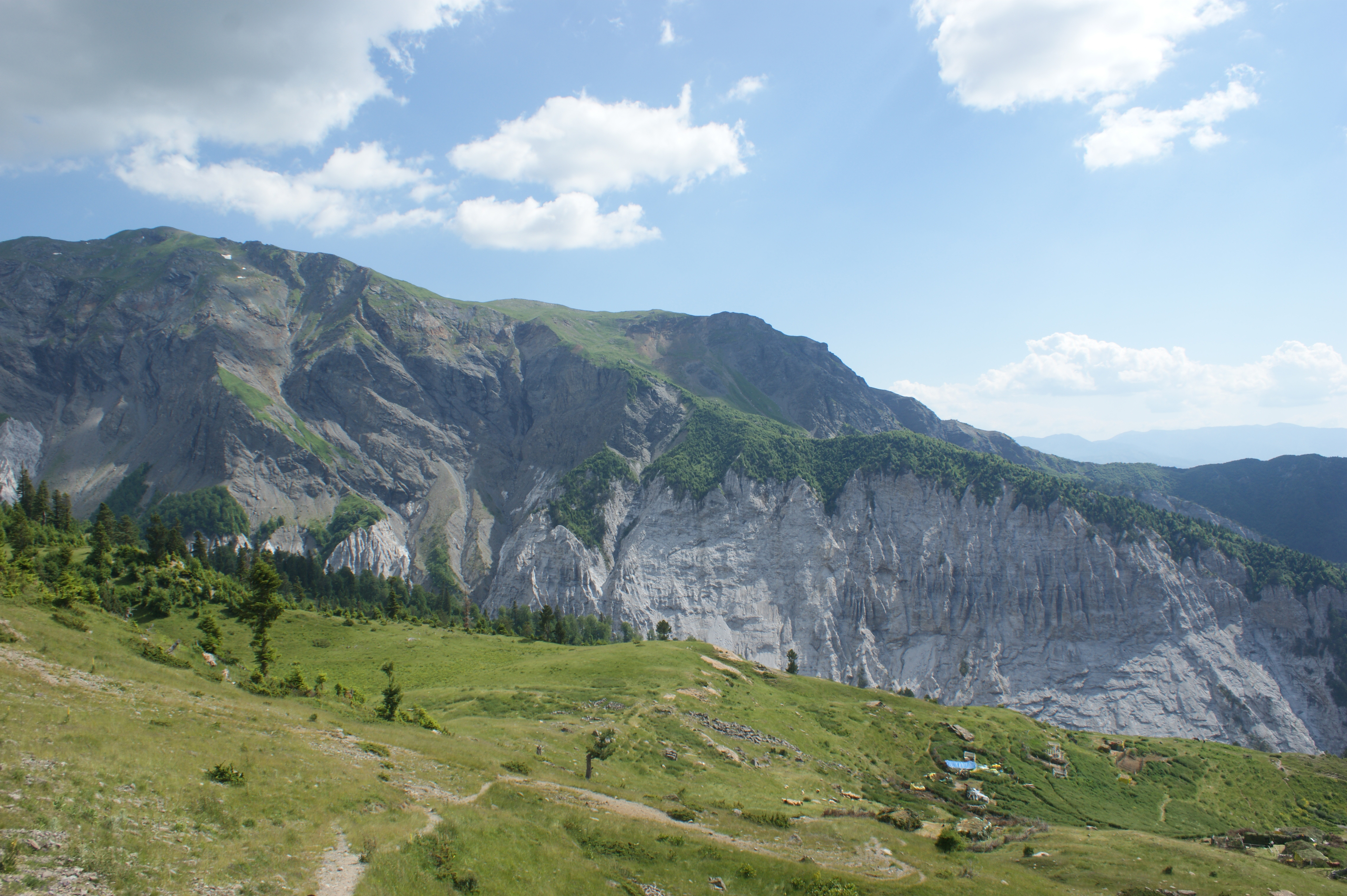
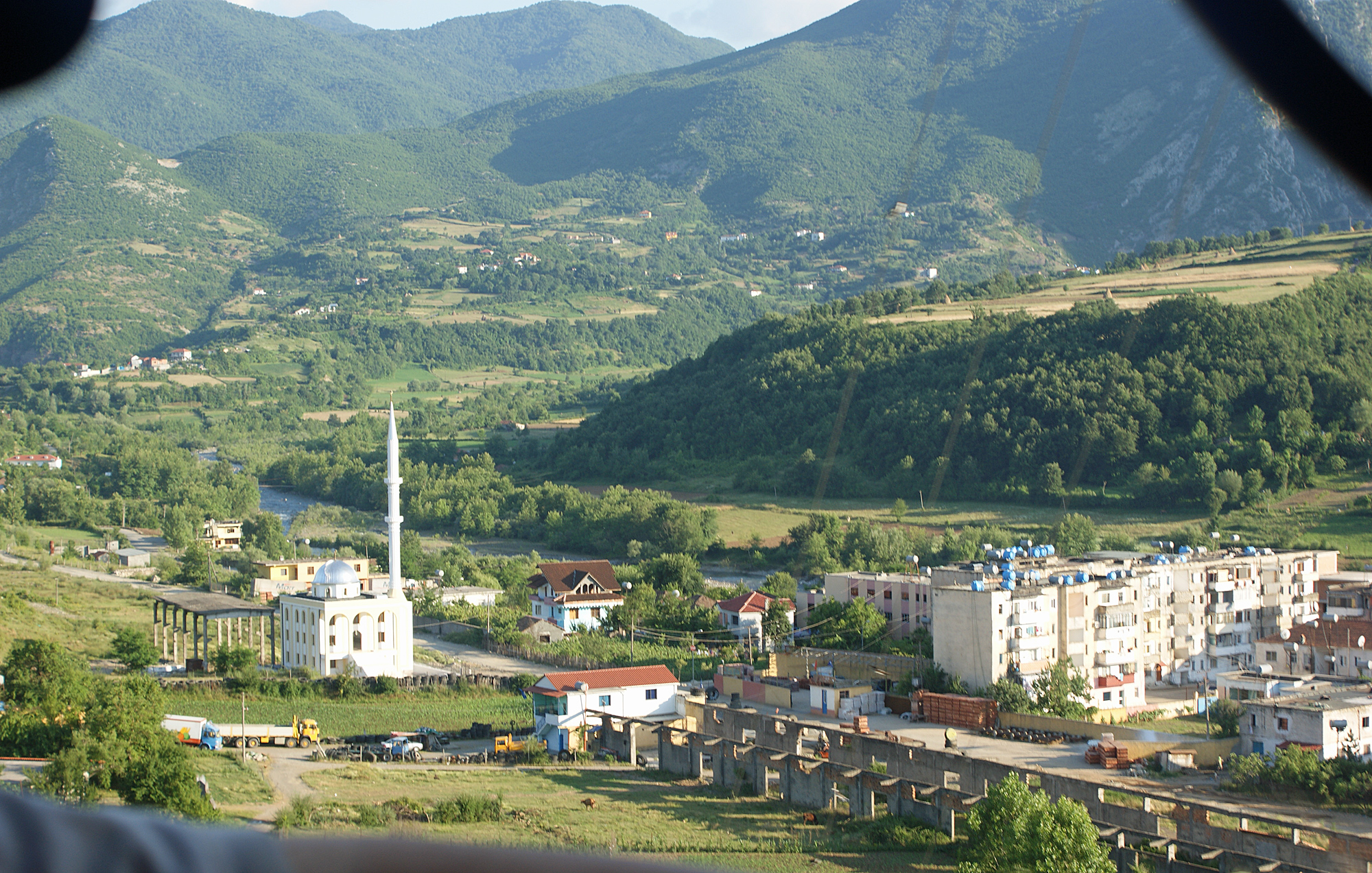
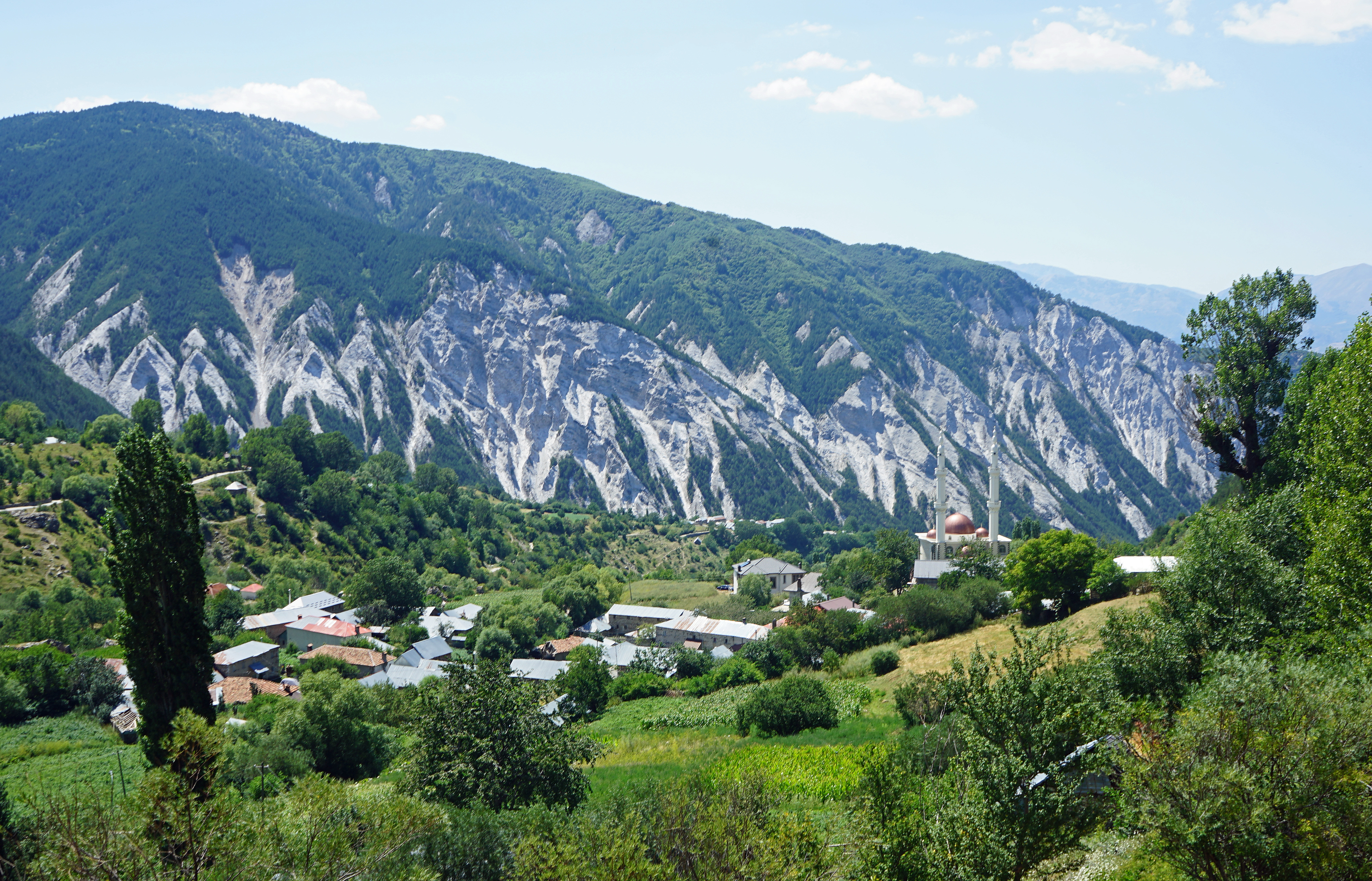
- Burrel Mali i Bardhë Mali i Gramës Klos Radomirë

- Flag Emblem

- Coordinates: 41°40′N 20°20′E
- Country: Albania
- Seat: Peshkopi
- Subdivisions: 4 municipalities

Government
  - Council chairman: Alma Selami (PS)

Area
  - Total: 2,586 km^{2} (998 sq mi)
  - Rank: 6th

Population (2023)
  - Total: 107,178
  - Rank: 11th
  - Density: 41.45/km^{2} (107.3/sq mi)
- Demonym(s): Dibran (m); Dibrane (f)
- Time zone: UTC+1 (CET)
  - Summer (DST): UTC+2 (CEST)
- Postal Code: 8301-8315
- 0.790 high · 11th of 12: HDI (2023)
- NUTS Code: AL011
- Website: Official Website

Dibër County (Albanian pronunciation: [dibəɽ]; Albanian: Qarku i Dibrës) is one of the 12 counties of the Republic of Albania, spanning a surface area of 2,586 square kilometres (998 sq mi) with the capital in Peshkopi. The county borders on the counties of Durrës, Elbasan, Kukës, Lezhë, Tirana and the country of North Macedonia. It is divided into the four municipalities of Bulqizë, Dibër, Klos and Mat. The municipalities are further subdivided into 290 towns and villages in total.

Topographically, the county is dominated by mountainous and high terrain, with a great variety of natural features including valleys, canyons, gorges, rivers, glacial lakes and dense forests. Various mountains ranging between 1,500 and 2,700 metres (4,921 and 8,858 ft) meters above sea level run the length of the county from north to south, including the Korab mountains in the east with Mali i Gramës and Korab at an altitude of 2,764 metres (9,068 ft) being the highest mountain in the county and as well as in Albania. The Dejë mountain 2,245 metres (7,365 ft) rises in the center, while in the east the county is dominated by the Lura mountains. The Skanderbeg mountains on the west separates the Central Mountain Range with the Western Lowlands. The county, marked by a significant biological diversity, is water-rich with a dense river network, a rich aquifer system, and significant karst underground watercourses. It is home to the source of the river Mat which rises in Martanesh. Besides the Mat, the Drin river is an important waterway in the region.

The county territory covers four distinct climatic types as of the Köppen climate classification; oceanic, continental, mediterranean and subarctic. Located in the interior of Albania, the climate is mediterranean with continental influences. Mean monthly temperature ranges between −20 °C (−4 °F) (in January) and 25–30 °C (77–86 °F) (in July). Mean annual precipitation ranges between 600 millimetres (24 inches) and 1,000 millimetres (39 inches) depending on geographic region and prevailing climate type.

Dibër is an historically homogeneous county. Its capital and most populous city is Peshkopi. Tourism is one of the most important sectors in the county and has the largest potential to be a source for sustainable income, due to its natural and cultural heritage. Although the county has abundant natural resources like chromium, sulfur and marble. Dibër is predominantly an agriculture county.

== History ==
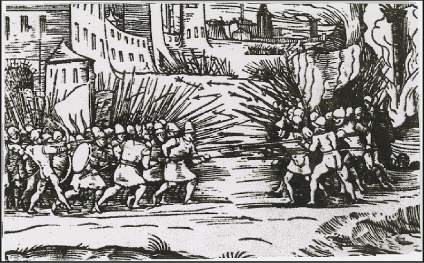
The second Battle of Oranik in 1456 took place in Dibër.

Human activity in the territory of the modern Dibër County can be traced back to the Neolithic.

The region that today corresponds to the county territory was inhabited by the ancient Illyrian tribe of Penestae. They were the first people to leave lasting traces and cultural heritage throughout the region. It is evidenced by the settlements of the Early Bronze Age in Manasdren, the Middle Bronze Age in Çetush, the Late Bronze Age in Pesjakë and several others.

In the Middle Ages, Dibër was part of the Principality of Kastrioti ruled by the royal Kastrioti family with Gjon Kastrioti on the Albanian throne. After the death of Gjon Kastrioti in 1437, the eastern region was annexed by the Ottomans and became seat of the Sanjak of Dibra. The comprising regions were awarded to his son Gjergj Kastriot Skanderbeg, where he survived to conquer back his father’s land and unite all of Albania in 1444. In the 15th century, further during the Albanian wars the region was the frontier between the Ottomans and the League of Lezhë.

In the 19th century, the Congress of Dibër declared the Albanian language as an official language within the Ottoman Empire. After the Balkan Wars and following the collapse of the Ottoman Empire, the great powers established the borders of the Balkan states at the Conference of London. The Dibër Valley was cut in half. The western part was assigned to Albania, while the eastern part went to the Kingdom of Serbia, today North Macedonia.

== Geography ==
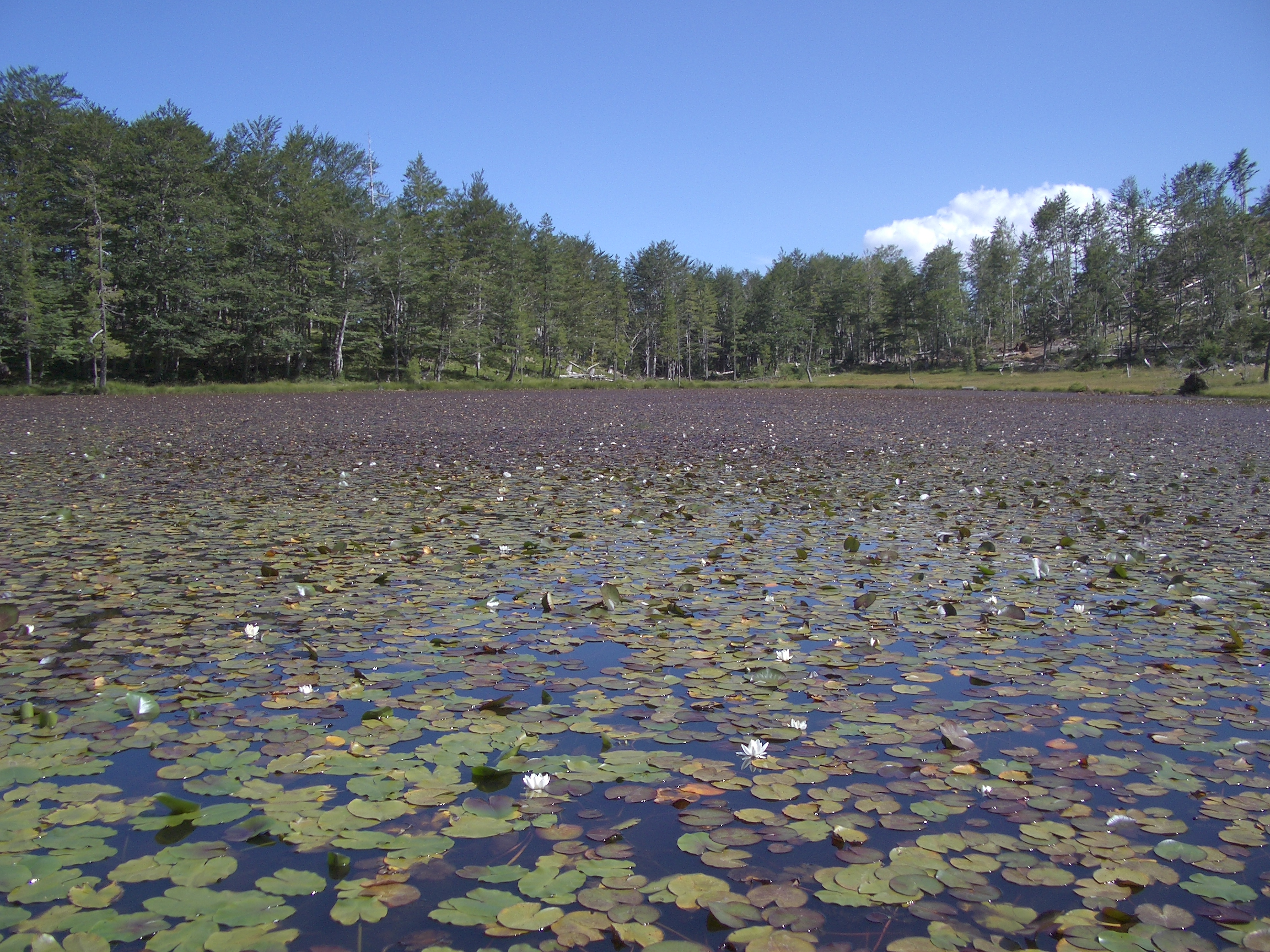
The glacial Lura Lakes situated in the eastern Lura Mountains.

Dibër is one of 12 counties of Albania, located in the south and southeast of the Northern Region. It lies between latitudes 42° N, and longitudes 20° E. The county area is 2,586 km^{2} (998 sq mi) and the sixth largest by area in Albania and the second largest in the Northern Region. It is limited to the counties of Kukës to the north and northeast, Lezhë to the northwest, Durrës to the east, Tirana to the southwest, Elbasan to the southeast and North Macedonia to the west.

Much of the Dibër County is dominated by mountainous or high terrain, with a great variety of natural features caused by prehistoric glaciers and varied topography. The county lies about 380 meters up to 2,700 metres above sea level. The main topographic features of the county are the presence of the three major mountain ranges which are the Korab mountains in the east, the Lura mountains in the east and the Skanderbeg mountains in the west, separating the Central Mountain Range with the Western Lowlands.

The most important rivers flowing through Dibër include the Mat and Black Drin. The Mat river has its source in Martanesh. It heads westwards through deep gorges and canyons to Mat and northwest through the towns of Klos and Burrel. The Black Drin flows out from the Ohrid lake and passes through Peshkopi and Maqellara. Rising in Ohrid, the Drin river originates near Kukës at the confluence of the Black Drin and White Drin.

Phytogeographically, the county falls within the Dinaric Mountains mixed forests and Balkan mixed forests terrestrial ecoregions of the Palearctic temperate broadleaf and mixed forest. The forests are composed of diverse species of deciduous and coniferous trees and a great variety of wildflowers. The mountainous area of the county occupies 56.3% of the territory, while the remaining 43.7% by plains and hills. Inside the county, there are two national parks and a nature park, which include the Lurë National Park, Zall-Gjoçaj National Park and the Korab-Koritnik Nature Park. The eastern bound of the county forms a part of the European Green Belt, which serves as a retreat for endangered mammal and plant species.

== Demographics ==
Historical population
Year	Pop.	±%
1950	95,247	—
1960	116,290	+22.1%
1969	146,138	+25.7%
1979	185,938	+27.2%
1989	226,324	+21.7%
2001	189,854	−16.1%
2011	137,047	−27.8%
2023	107,178	−21.8%

It has a total population of around 107,178 people as of the 2023 census. The population density is 41 inhabitants per square kilometre (110/sq mi). Compared to other counties, Dibër has a very low population density. In addition, the remote mountainous areas are almost unpopulated. The largest cities are Peshkopi, Burrel, Bulqizë and Klos.

Data from the 2023 census showed that Dibër County was 81.5% Albanian, 1.61% Bulgarian, 0.20% Macedonian, 0.48% Roma or Balkan Egyptian, while the remaining 15.93% did not specify their ethnicity.

=== Religion ===
Between the 2011 and 2023 censuses in Dibër, the religious landscape underwent changes. The proportion of Sunni Muslims decreased from 81.4% to 62.7%. Conversely, the presence of Bektashi Muslims increased from 3.8% to 5.9%. Catholic Christians decreased from 2.0% to 0.1%. Orthodox Christians remained relatively stable at around 0.1%. Evangelical Christians also remained stable at around 0.01%.

There was a notable increase in the segment of the population identifying as believers without denomination, which grew from 4.4% to 9.0%. The proportion of atheists remained stable at around 0.7%. The percentage of individuals who preferred not to answer decreased from 6.2% to 4.1%, while the category of "Not stated/other" saw a significant increase from 1.4% to 15.9%.

Population of Dibër according to religious group (2011–2023)
Religion group	Census 2011		Census 2023		Difference (2023−2011)	
Religion group	Number	Percentage	Number	Percentage	Number	Percentage
Sunni Muslim	111,551	81.4%	67,181	62.7%	-44,370	-18.7%
Bektashi Muslim	5,264	3.8%	6,317	5.9%	+1,053	+2.1%
Total Muslim	116,815	85.2%	73,498	68.6%	-43,317	-16.6%
Catholic Christian	2,799	2.0%	111	0.1%	-2,688	-1.9%
Orthodox Christian	123	0.1%	73	0.1%	-50	-0.0%
Evangelical	16	0.0%	12	0.0%	-4	0.0%
Other Christian	12	0.0%	5	0.0%	-7	-0.0%
Total Christian*	2,950	2.2%	201	0.2%	-2,749	-2.0%
Atheists	929	0.7%	717	0.7%	-212	-0.0%
Believers without denomination	5,970	4.4%	9,589	9.0%	+3,619	+4.6%
Total Non-religious	6,899	5.0%	10,306	9.6%	+3,407	+4.6%
Prefer not to answer	8,502	6.2%	4,389	4.1%	-4,113	-2.1%
Not stated / Not available**	1,876	1.4%	17,077	15.9%	+15,201	+14.6%
TOTAL	137,047	100%	107,178	100%	-29,869	–

== Economy ==
Dibër County’s economy historically depended on agriculture and sheparding, although the collapse of communism and lack of jobs has led to many Albanians migrating abroad. Dibra is consequently one of the poorer regions of Albania due to its remote and rugged situation, although it is more developed than neighboring Elbasan and Kukës counties which have seen severe economic stagnation. Dibër County is the second least developed county in Albania with only Kukës being less developed.

== Gallery ==
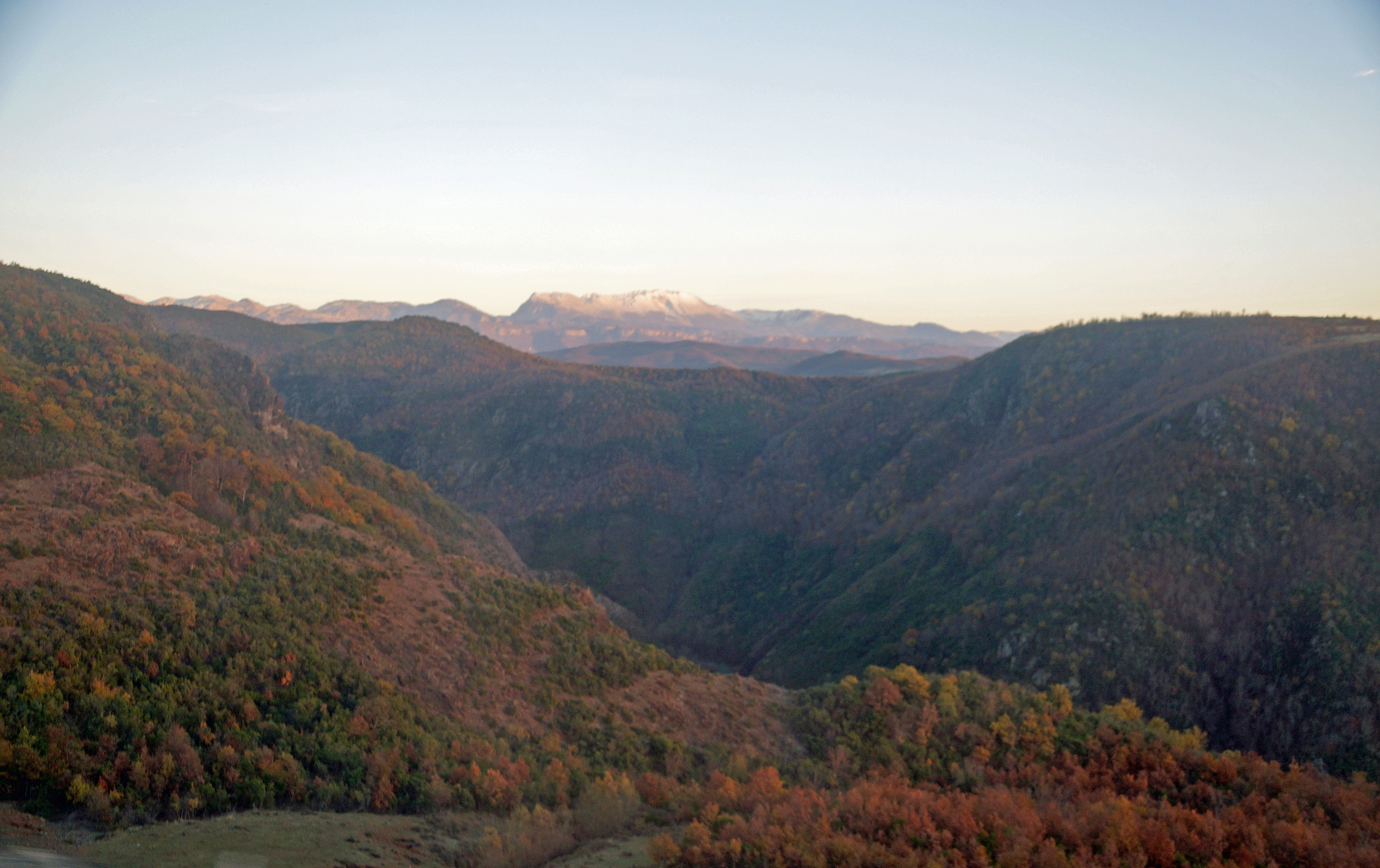
Dejë Mountain

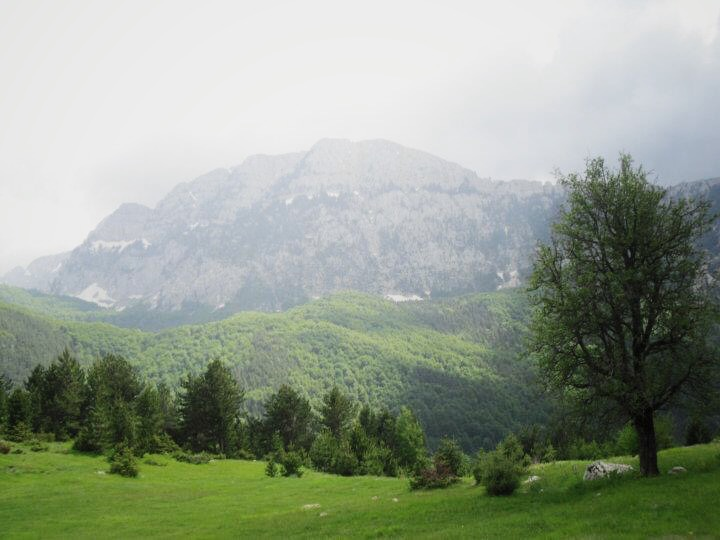
Malthit e keq

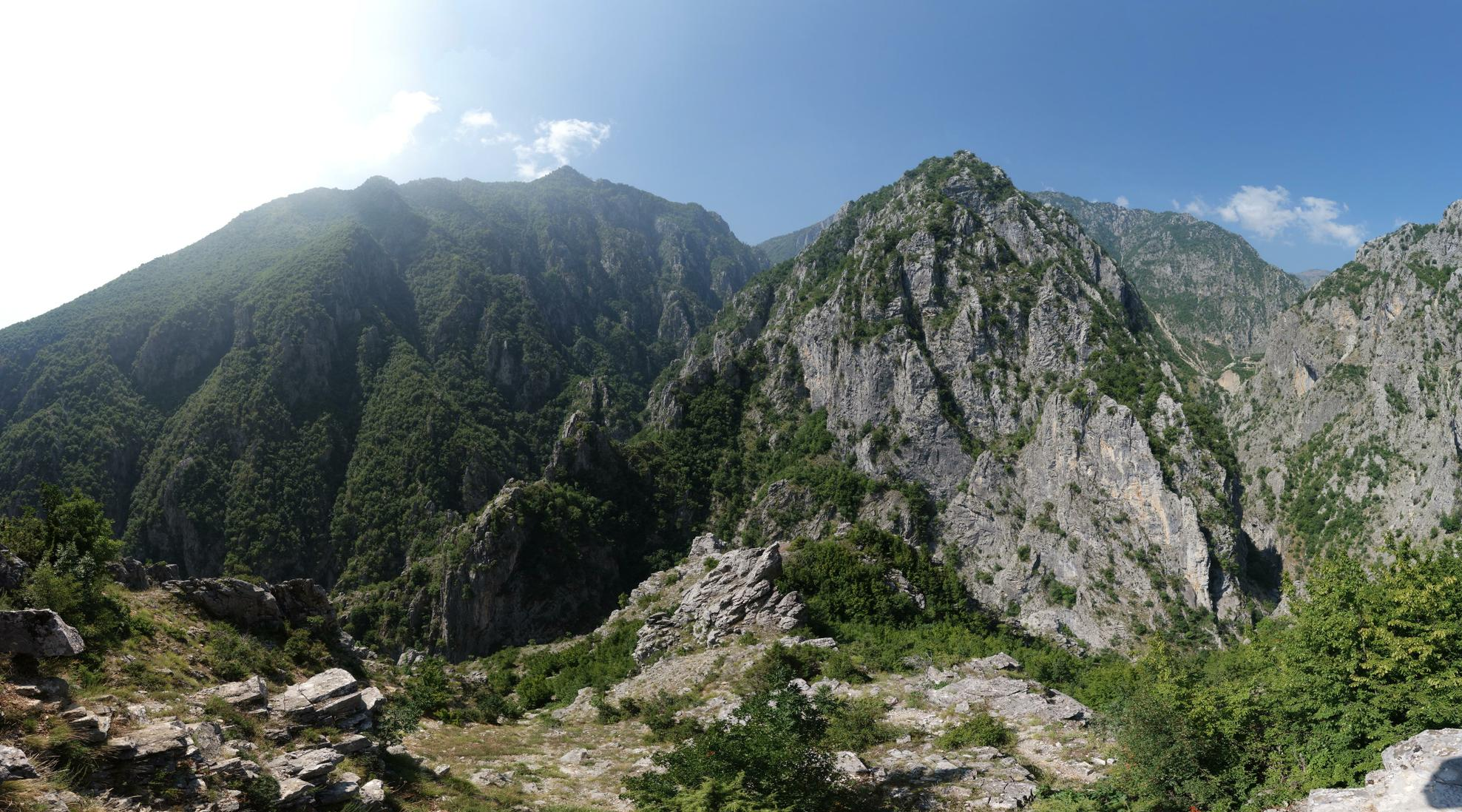
Gryka e Setës

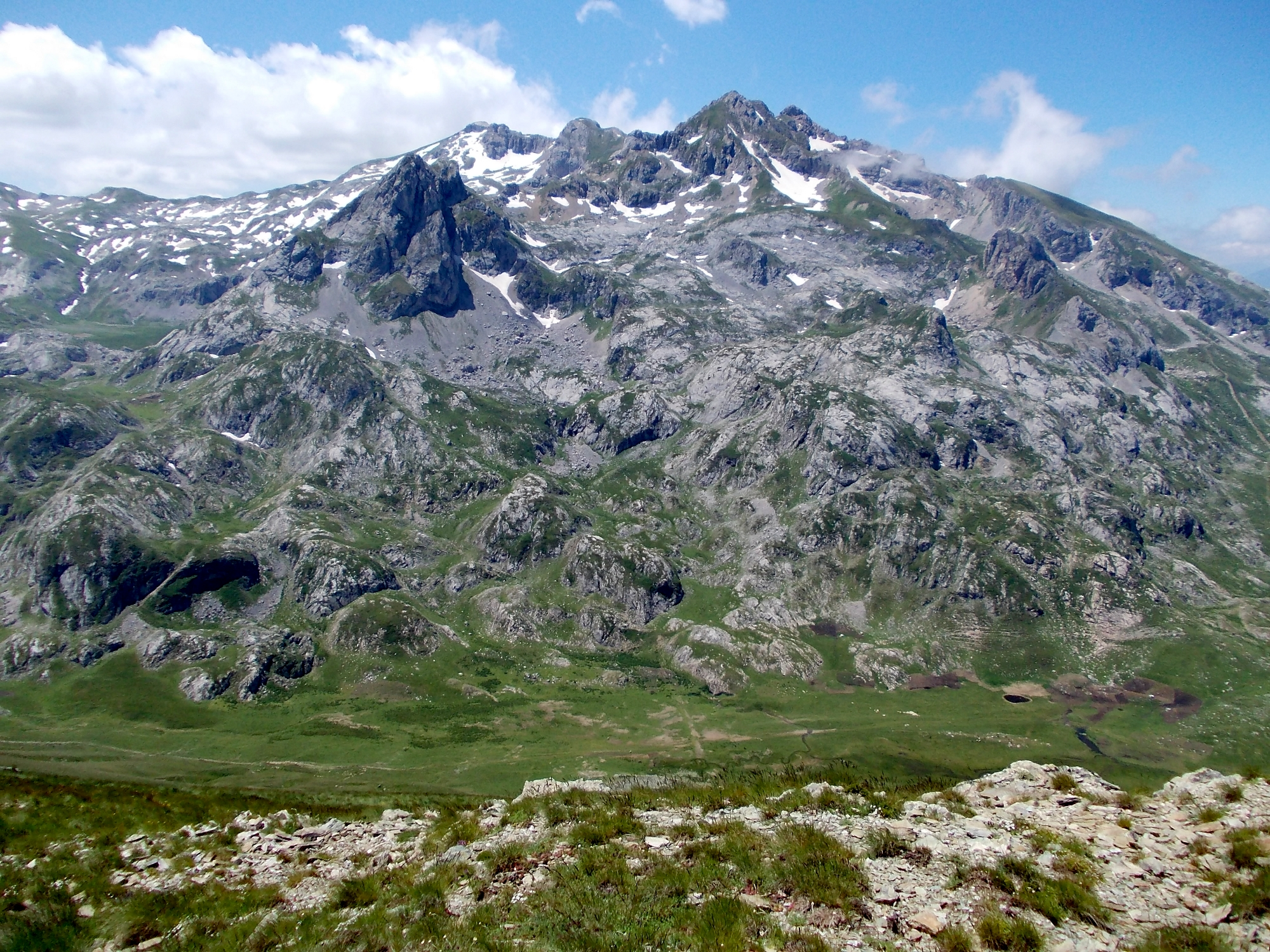
Mount Korab

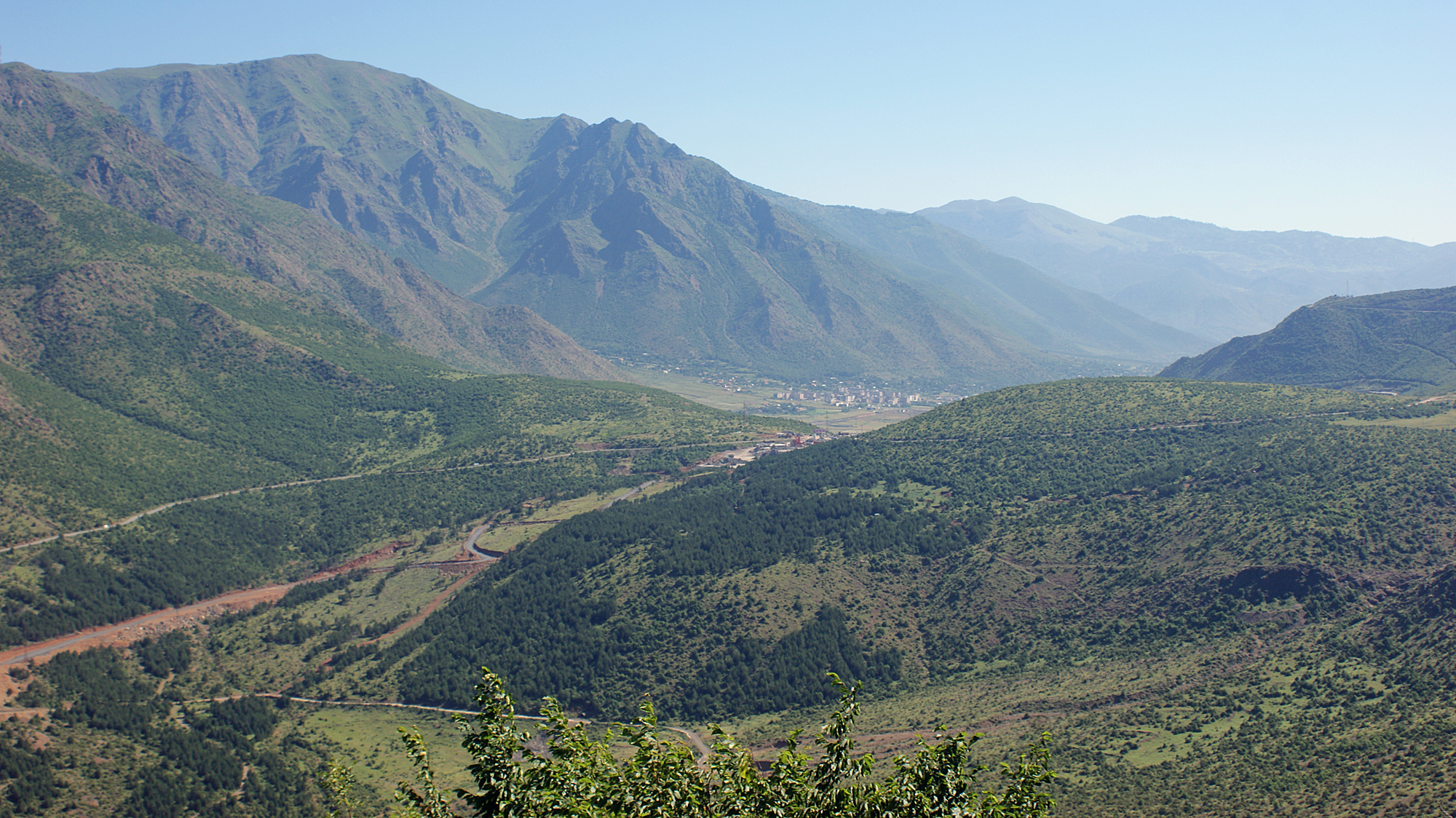
Bualli Pass

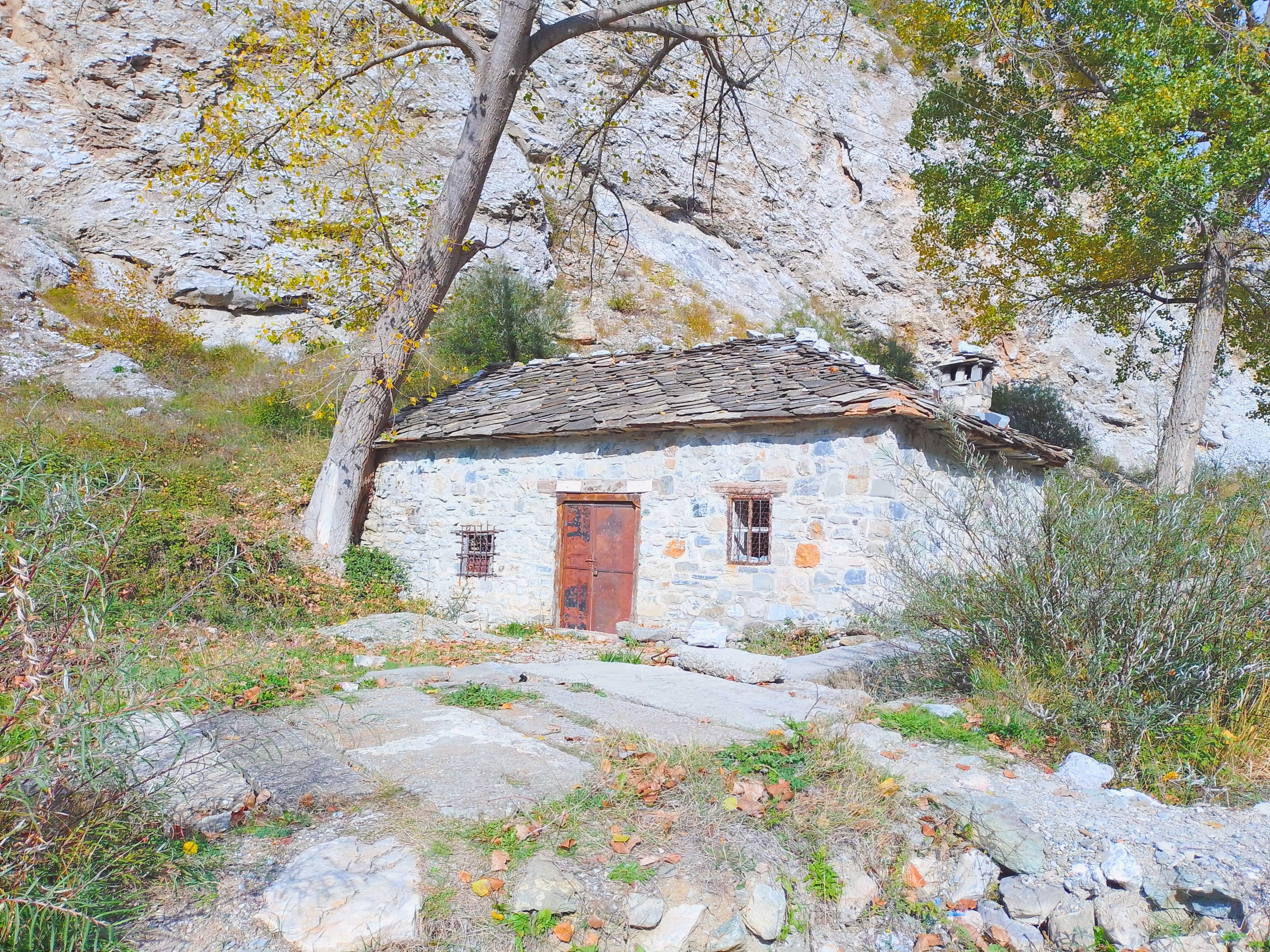

== See also ==
- Geography of Albania
- Politics of Albania
- Divisions of Albania
- List of mountains in Dibër County
