= Mali i Dejës =

Massif in Albania

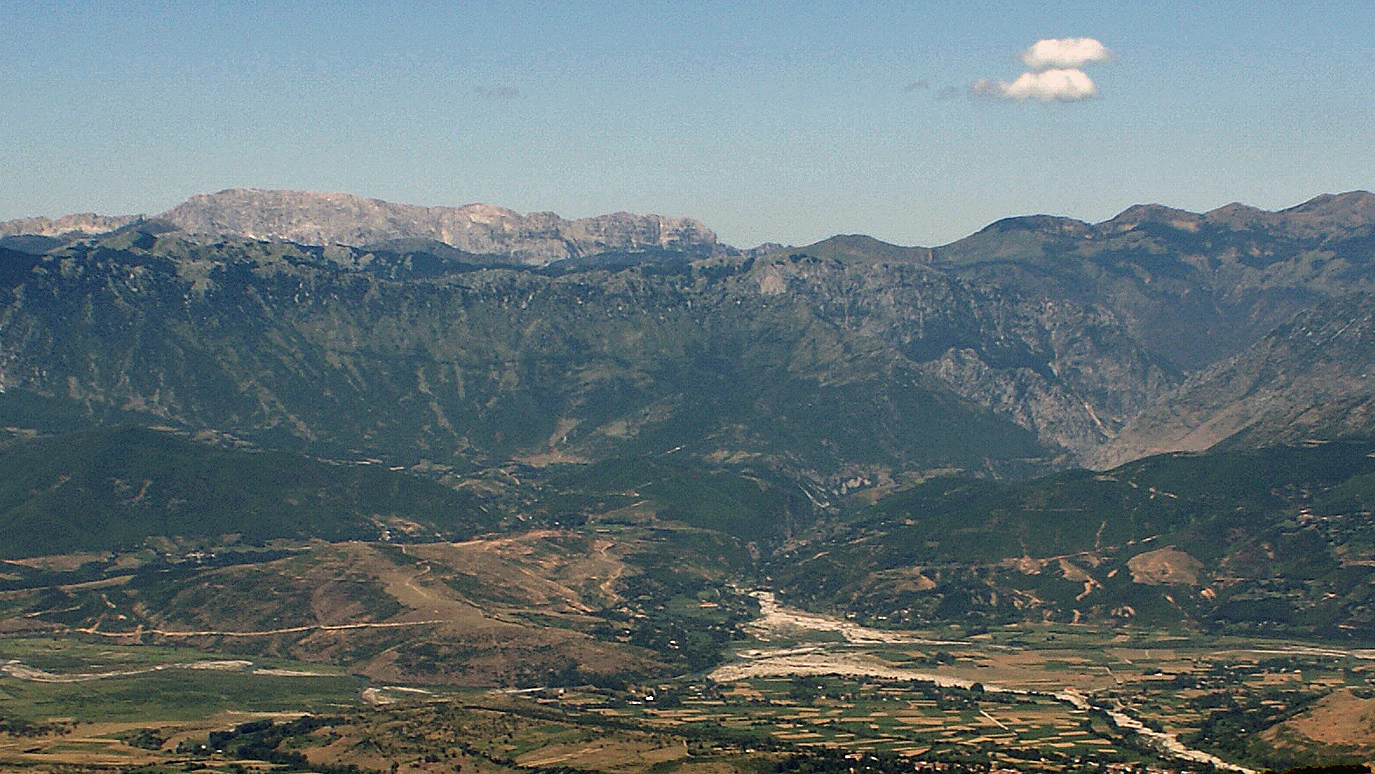
- View of the Drin valley overlooking the villages of Arras, Çidhën and Sinë, with Mount Dejë in the background.

Highest point
- Elevation: 2,246 m (7,369 ft)
- Prominence: 1,403 m (4,603 ft)
- Isolation: 27.5 km (17.1 mi)
- Listing: Ribu
- Coordinates: 41°42′00″N 20°09′44″E

Naming
- English translation: Shoal mountain

Geography
- Location within Albania
- Country: Albania
- Region: Central Mountain Region
- Municipality: Mat

Geology
- Rock age: Cretaceous
- Mountain type: massif
- Rock type(s): limestone, ultrabasic rock

Mali i Dejës (lit. 'Shoal mountain') is a massif located in the municipality of Mat, in northeastern Albania. Elevating at a height of 2,246 m (7,369 ft), it is bounded by the Burrel basin to the west and Runja summit to the east. Qafëmurrë in the southeast separates it from Balgjaj, while the valley of Zall Gjoçaj, the left branch of the Uraka river in the north, separates it from the karst plateau of Valmura.

== Geology ==
Composed primarily of Cretaceous limestone layers that rest on top of ultrabasic rocks, the mountain's ridge has been shaped by karst phenomena, resulting in a predominantly flat structure. The western slope gradually descends towards the Macukull karst plateau, while the eastern slope descends towards Mbasdejë. There are no visible streams or surface water flows in the area. Guri i Vashës (1,735 m), a white limestone rock formation is located at the base of the massif.

== Biodiversity ==
Vegetation consists mainly of oak trees found at elevations up to 1,000 meters, while beech trees are present at higher altitudes.

== Climbing route ==
The mountain can be reached from Tirana via Krujë and Shtamë Pass, or from Shkodër along the Milot–Burrel road. The latter route passes through a remote and heavily forested region.

A winding road leads toward Varosh, located approximately 32 km away. From there, access continues on foot through forest trails and mountain paths leading toward the base of the climbing areas.

== See also ==
- List of mountains in Albania
