= Lake Sopa =

Sope Lake
- Liqeni i Sopes (Albanian)
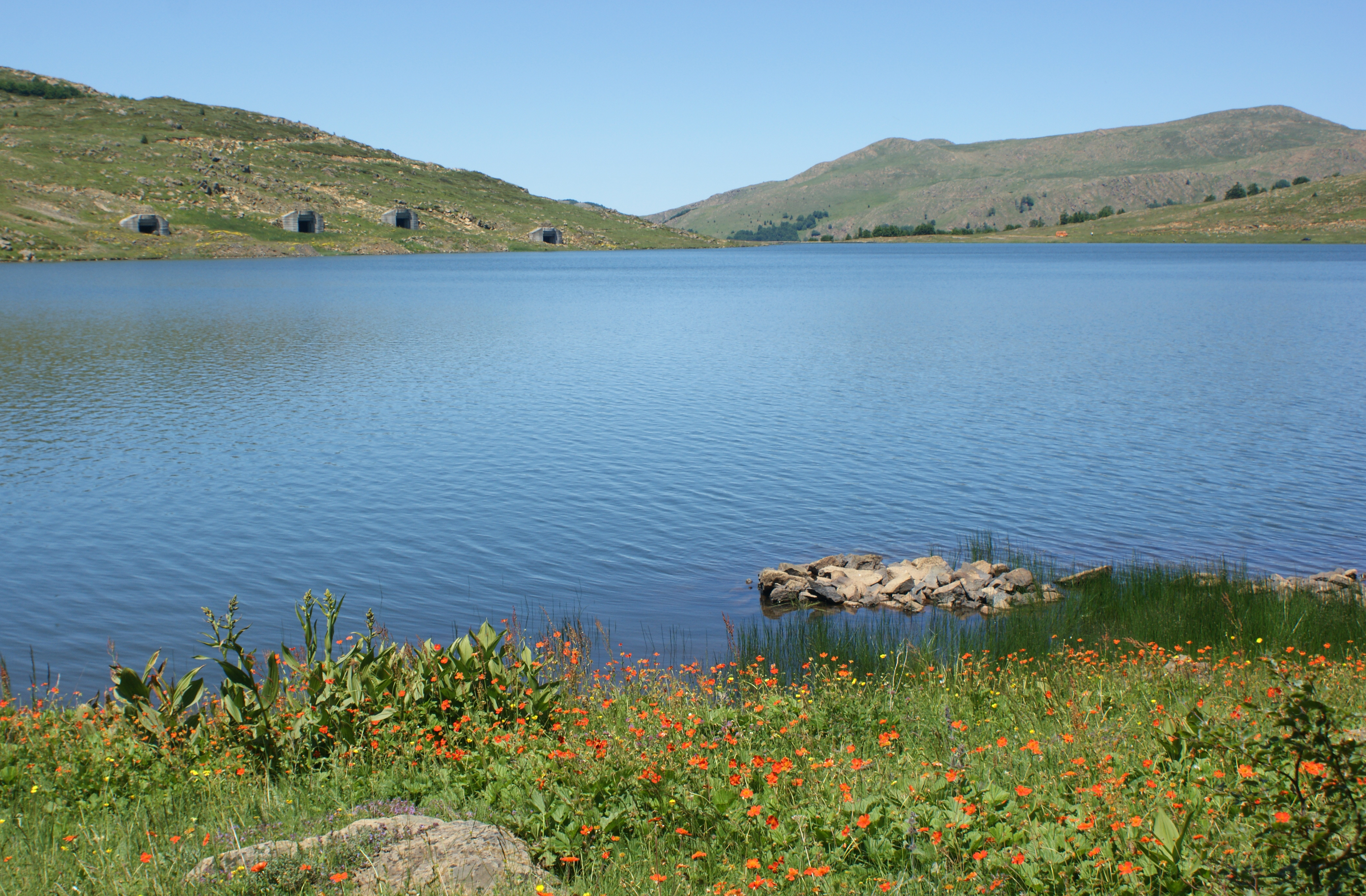

- Location within Albania Location within Balkans
- Interactive map of Sope Lake
- Location: Mali i Lopës
- Coordinates: 41°26′07″N 20°17′12″E
- Type: Glacial lake
- Basin countries: Albania
- Max. length: 0.88 km (0.55 mi)
- Max. width: 0.73 km (0.45 mi)
- Surface area: 2.9 ha (7.2 acres)
- Surface elevation: 1,734 m (5,689 ft)

Sope Lake (Albanian: Liqeni i Sopes) is a lake in Albania. It is the largest natural mountain lake in Albania.

Sope Lake is located on the southern slopes of the Mali i Lopës with a surface elevation of 1,734 m (5,689 ft). The maximum length of the lake is about 880 m (2,887 ft) and the maximum width of it is about 730 m (2,395 ft). The lake has a surface area of 29 hectares (72 acres).
