= Dibër District =

Defunct (2000) Albanian administrative area

Dibër District Rrethi i Dibrës
- Former district
- Coordinates: 41°43′N 20°21′E
- Country: Albania
- Dissolved: 2000
- Seat: Peshkopi

Area
  - Total: 761 km^{2} (294 sq mi)

Population (2001)
  - Total: 86,144
  - Density: 113/km^{2} (293/sq mi)
- Time zone: UTC+1 (CET)
  - Summer (DST): UTC+2 (CEST)

Dibër District (Albanian: Rrethi i Dibrës) was one of the 36 districts of Albania, which were dissolved in July 2000 and replaced by 12 counties. It had a population of 86,144 in 2001, and an area of 761 km^{2} (294 sq mi). Located in the northeast of the country, its capital was Peshkopi. The area of the former district is coextensive with the present municipality of Dibër, which is part of Dibër County.

== Administrative divisions ==
The district consisted of the following municipalities:

- Arras
- Fushë-Çidhën
- Kala e Dodës
- Kastriot
- Lurë
- Luzni
- Maqellarë
- Melan
- Muhurr
- Peshkopi
- Qendër Tomin
- Selishtë
- Sllovë
- Zall-Dardhë
- Zall-Reç

== Notable people ==
- Skanderbeg
- Gjon Kastrioti
- Fiqri Dine
