= Ismail Strazimiri =

Albanian resistance member

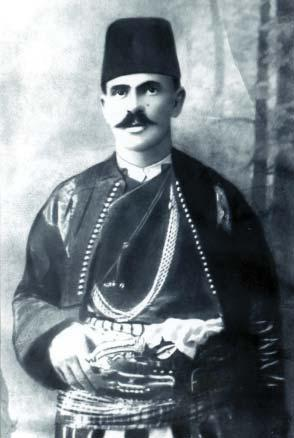
- Born: 1868; Strezimir, Kosovo Vilayet, Ottoman Empire (modern North Macedonia)
- Died: 17 November 1943 (aged 75); Sllovë, Albania
- Military career
- Allegiance: Yugoslav Partisans
- Service years: 1943
- Rank: Commander
- Conflicts: World War II in Yugoslav Macedonia, Ohrid-Debar Uprising, June Revolution

Ismail Strazimiri (Albanian: Ismail Strazimiri) was an Albanian revolutionary, military and educational activist from Upper Reka.

== Biography ==
He was born in 1868 in the Upper Reka village of Strezimir, Ottoman Empire, from which he bears the nickname Strazimiri. He was a member of the Society for the Unity of the Albanian Language and participated in the struggle for education in Albanian, as well as in the Albanian uprisings of 1910 and the 1912 rebellion. He headed a çeta in 1912, entering Debar. He was a supporter of the temporary government in Vlora.

He participated in the Ohrid-Debar Uprising in 1913 against the Serbian occupiers and opposed the pro-Turkish Esad Pasha Toptani. He was captured by the Serbs and imprisoned. In 1920–1921, he was on the side of Elez Isufi. He participated in the June Revolution in 1924, during which Tirana was captured, Ahmed Zogu fled to Yugoslavia, and Fan Noli became prime minister.

In 1943, he joined the partisan forces and distinguished himself in the battles near Peshkopia. He managed to persuade the people of Debar to accept the Yugoslav National Liberal Movement. He was killed in Slova in November 1943.

Strazimiri is the author of one of the earliest autobiographies written in Albanian. First written in 1931, it would be published 80 years later. There are 2 monuments erected commemorating Strazimiri, one in Sllovë and one in Peshkopi.
