= Sinë =

- Village
- Location within Albania
- Coordinates: 41°43′50″N 20°17′51″E
- Country: Albania
- County: Dibër
- Municipality: Dibër
- Administrative unit: Arras
- Time zone: UTC+1 (CET)
  - Summer (DST): UTC+2 (CEST)

Sinë (Albanian definite form: Sina), is a small village in Dibër, Albania. After the 2015 local government reforms, it became part of the municipality Dibër.

== History ==
Pal Kastrioti (fl. 1383–1407) was given the village of Sina (Signa) as a fief by Zetan lord Balša II. Pal's son, Konstantin II (named after his grandfather Konstantin Kastrioti), was the lord of Serina (Sina, or Cerüja).

The settlements of Setina e Sipërme and Setina e Poshtme are attested in the Ottoman defter of 1467 as villages belonging to the timar of Karagöz in the vilayet of Lower Dibra. Both villages had a total of three households respectively and the anthropology recorded depicts an overwhelmingly Albanian character, although a single instance of Slavicisation via the usage of the suffix -ovići is attested in the latter settlement. From Setina e Sipërme: Gjon Vlashi, Gjon Niqifori, and Vlash Bilashi. From Setina e Poshtme: Dimitri Kastrijoti, Pal Pirovići, and Kolë Prifti.

== Notable people ==
- Skanderbeg, national hero of Albania
