= Vrenjt =

Vranjt
- Village
- Location within Albania
- Coordinates: 41°44′5″N 20°25′35″E
- Country: Albania
- County: Dibër
- Municipality: Dibër
- Administrative unit: Kastriot
- Time zone: UTC+1 (CET)
  - Summer (DST): UTC+2 (CEST)

Vranjt is a village in the former municipality Kastriot, Dibër County, northeastern Albania. At the 2015 local government reform it became part of the municipality Dibër. It is situated at 1100 metres above sea level, five kilometres north of Peshkopi city and seven kilometres from the Macedonian border. In the 2011 census, there were 65 residents.

== Places of interest ==
- The ruins of an unknown building
- The centre of the village
- The forests around the village
- The Voleza river
- The valleys of Voleza
- The old houses

== Sources ==
- (Book) Familja e Vranjtit
