= 1949 Kategoria e Dytë =

Second-division football season in Albania

Kategoria e Dytë
- Season: 1949
- Champions: Spartaku Pogradec & Lezha
- Promoted: Spartaku Pogradec & Lezha

The 1949 Kategoria e Dytë is the sixth season of the second tier of football in Albania.

The previous season (1948–49) had been abandoned in March 1949, under Soviet pressure to revert to a spring-to-summer schedule instead of the fall-to-spring schedule that Western European nations had adopted. The 1949 campaign began on 22 May and finished in October.

== First round ==
The first round was played by 57 teams, spread across 13 groups.

=== Group 1 ===
Team	Location
Peshkopia	Peshkopi, Dibër
Brezhda	Tomin, Dibër
Dohoshishti	Tomin, Dibër
Greva	Melan, Dibër
Homesh	Shupenzë, Dibër
Maqellara	Maqellarë, Dibër

Peshkopia won the group and advanced to the next round

=== Group 2 ===
Team	Location
Kukësi	Kukës
Bicaj	Bicaj, Kukës
Kruma	Krumë, Has
Shishtaveci	Shishtavec, Kukës

Kukësi won the group and advanced to the next round

=== Group 3 ===
Team	Location
Kopliku	Koplik, Malësi e Madhe
Lezha	Lezhë
NBSh Shkodër	Shkodër
Puka	Pukë

Kopliku and Lezha advanced to the next round

=== Group 4 ===
Team	Location
Kruja	Krujë
Mamurrasi	Mamurras, Kurbin
Miloti	Milot, Kurbin
Rubiku	Rubik, Mirditë

No clubs from Group 4 advanced to the next round

=== Group 5 ===
Team	Location
NBSh Ylli Kuq Kamëz	Kamëz
NBSh 8 Nëntori Sukth	Sukth, Durrës
ShB Kavajë	Kavajë
Xhafzotaj	Xhafzotaj, Shijak

NBSh Ylli Kuq Kamëz won the group and advanced to the next round

=== Group 6 ===
Team	Location
Mbrostari	Mbrostar, Fier
Frakulla e Madhe	Frakull, Fier
Libofsha	Libofshë, Fier
NBSh Çlirimi	Fier
Roskoveci	Roskovec

Mbrostari won the group and advanced to the next round

=== Group 7 ===
Team	Location
Berati	Berat
Patosi	Patos
Spartaku Kuçovë	Kuçovë
Lushnja	Lushnjë

Berati, Patosi and Spartaku Kuçovë advanced to the next round

=== Group 8 ===
Team	Location
Kolonja	Kolonjë
Tepelena	Tepelenë
Leskoviku	Leskovik, Kolonjë
24 Maji Përmet	Përmet

Kolonja and Tepelena advanced to the next round

=== Group 9 ===
Team	Location
Peqini	Peqin
Bubullima	Bubullimë, Lushnjë
KK Lushnjë	Lushnjë
Rrogozhina	Rrogozhinë

Peqini won the group and advanced to the next round

=== Group 10 ===
Team	Location
Spartaku Pogradec	Pogradec
Bilishti	Bilisht, Devoll
Drenova	Drenovë, Korçë
Hoçishti	Hoçisht, Devoll
Pojani	Pojan, Maliq

No clubs from Group 10 advanced to the next round

=== Group 11 ===
Team	Location
Mifoli	Novoselë, Vlorë
NBSh Llakatundi	Shushicë, Vlorë
Narta	Nartë, Devoll
Selenica	Selenicë

No clubs from Group 11 advanced to the next round

=== Group 12 ===
Team	Location
Himara	Himarë
Dhërmiu	Dhërmi, Himarë
Novosela	Novoselë, Vlorë
Qeparo	Qeparo, Himarë
Vuna	Vuno, Himarë

Himara won the group and advanced to the next round

=== Group 13 ===
Team	Location
Delvina	Delvinë
Gjirokastra	Gjirokastër
Deriçani	Dropull i Poshtëm, Dropull
Saranda	Sarandë

Delvina and Gjirokastra advanced to the next round

== Second round ==
- Spartaku Pogradec
- Lezha
- Berati
- Peshkopia
- Kukësi
- Kopliku
- NBSh Ylli Kuq Kamëz
- Mbrostari
- Patosi
- Spartaku Kuçovë
- Kolonja
- Tepelena
- Peqini
- Himara
- Delvina
- Gjirokastra

Spartaku Pogradec, Lezha and Berati advanced to the final round

== Final round ==
- Spartaku Pogradec
- Lezha
- Berati

Spartaku Pogradec and Lezha finished on equal points, so they shared the title
