= Lishan i Sipërm =

- Village
- Location within Albania
- Coordinates: 41°38′N 20°21′E
- Country: Albania
- County: Dibër
- Municipality: Dibër
- Administrative unit: Luzni
- Time zone: UTC+1 (CET)
  - Summer (DST): UTC+2 (CEST)

Lishan i Sipërm is a village in the former municipality of Luzni, 10 kilometres (6.2 mi) away from Peshkopi in northeastern Albania. At the 2015 local government reform it became part of the municipality Dibër. It sits 2,000 metres (6,600 ft) above sea level. There are approximately 150 residents.
