= Dibër =

Dibër may refer to the following places:

- Dibër Valley, a section of the Drin valley in the border region between North Macedonia and Albania
- Dibër County, Albania
  - Dibër District, an abolished district
  - Dibër (municipality)
- Debar (Albanian: Dibër), North Macedonia
  - Debar Municipality

== See also ==
- Debar dialect of Macedonian
- Debar Lake
- Sanjak of Dibra
- Ohrid–Debar uprising
