= Cen Elezi =

Albanian military officer

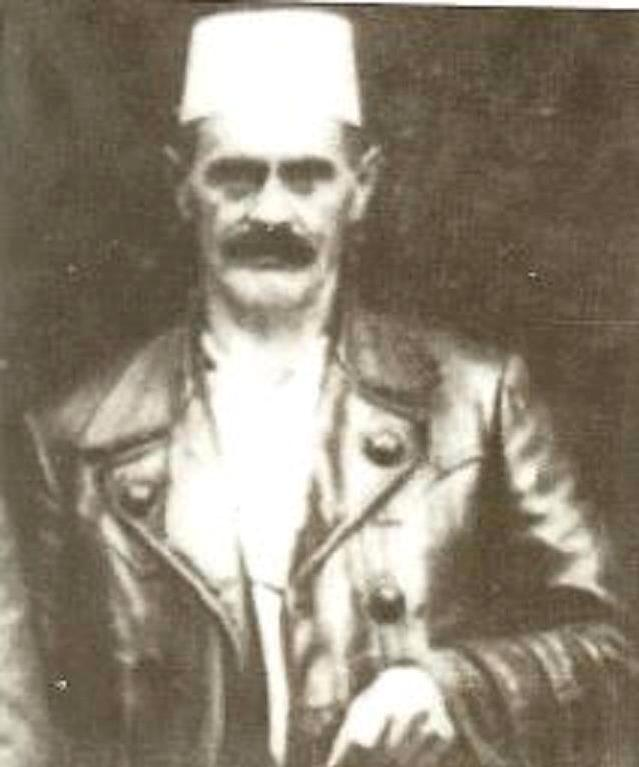
- Born: Hysen Elez Ndreu; 1884; Lisvalle (Sllove), Dibër, Ottoman Empire (modern Albania)
- Died: May 9, 1949 (aged 65); Yugoslavia
- Other name: Cen Elez Ndreu
- Occupation: Guerrilla fighter
- Known for: Dibran Wars (1912-1921), World War II in Albania

Cen Elezi was an Albanian bayraktar, Colonel and nationalist.

== Biography ==
Cen Elez Ndreu was born in Sllovë, Dibër, Ottoman Empire (in modern Albania). Ndreu was bayraktar of Sllovë region in Dibra and Kolonel, he was son of Albanian well known patriot Elez Isuf Ndreu and grandson of Isuf Ndreu. He is considered as a nationalist figure of Albania. Ndreu fought against Ottoman Empire alongside his father Isuf and people of Reç and liberated Peshkopi and The Greater Dibra. During 1913-1915 Cen Elezi participated in Balkan Wars against Serbian invasion in parts of Dibër and Lumë region.

On 16 April, he took part in Albanian peace delegation that went to Rome. In 1916 Elezi was selected to be part of Liberation Committee of Kosovo in Shkodër.In 1920’s he was part of his father’s uprising and fightings against Serbs during Albanian-Yugoslav border war (1921) and later clashes against Xhafer Ypi and Ahmet Zog government in 1922 and also participated in June Revolution (Albania) 1924. After Zog’s returning to power and his father Elez Isufi was murdered he left political activity and got more isolated in his town in Sllove where he took care of his family agricultural economy. After Italian Invasion of Albania he returned nationalist activities against italian occupation troops in 1941. He clashed also with other nationalists who supported Italian occupation. In 1943 after harsh fightings between italian troops and his supporters they bombed his hometown and burned his tower. After they left Albania in September he was coordinated with Balli Kombëtar leader Mid’hat Frashëri, nationalist fighters Xhem Hasa, Mefail Shehu, Hysni Dema etc against LANÇ operations however he was against civil war between Albanians. After Democratic Government of Albania establishment he spent two years in mountains until he fled to Yugoslavia, he was captured by UDBA and Yugoslav authorities and sent in prison. He died of tortures on 9 May 1949.
