= Islam Dobra =

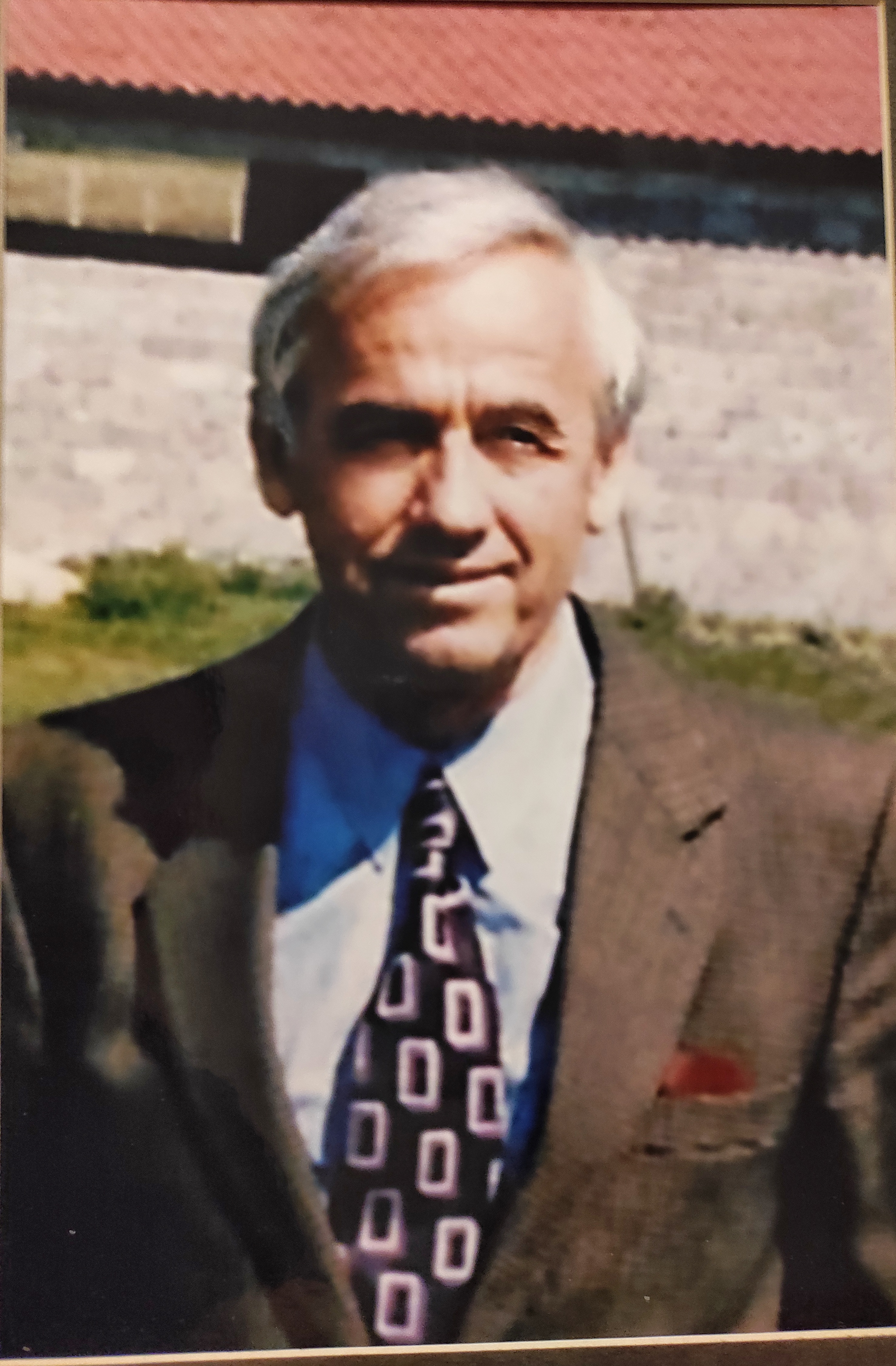
Islam Dobra

Dr.Islam Dobra (1934–2012) was a historian and educator from the Drenica region of Kosovo.

== Early life ==
Dobra was born in the village of Vrbovac in the municipality of Glogovac in 1934. He attended primary school in Tërstenik before going to Skenderaj Gymnasium in Glogovac for secondary school, graduating in 1953. He spent the next six years self-educating due to a dearth of Albanian language schooling in Yugoslavia, finally enrolling with geography Prof. Musa Gashi off the books for sixth form college at the Mitrovica, Kosovo. He graduated in 1961 and undertook undergraduate and graduate studies at the University of Pristina Faculty of Philosophy’s Department of History. His 1977 master’s thesis was entitled “Drenica në Luftën Nacionalçlirimtare 1941 – 1945” (“Drenica in the National Liberation War 1941 – 1945”), and his 1990 doctoral thesis was “Qëndrimi i Italisë ndaj çështjes shqiptare 1908 – 1912” (“Italian attitudes toward the Albanian cause 1908 – 1912” (written in Rome and defended in Pristina).

== Career ==
Dobra worked at the Albanological Institute of Pristina and contributed articles to newspapers and to journals such as Përparimi, Kosova, and Gjurmime alabanologjike - seria histori. He participated in social sciences workshops and symposiums at home and abroad.

== Works ==
- “Drenica në Luftën Nacionalçlirimtare 1941 – 1945,” masters’ thesis, 1977
- “Krerë dhe prijës të Lëvizje Kombëtare nga Drenica 1878 – 1948” (“Leaders of the Albanian National Awakening in Drenica 1878 – 1948”) vol. 1, Pristina, 1996
- “Krerë dhe prijës të Lëvizje Kombëtare nga Drenica 1878 – 1948” (“Leaders of the Albanian National Awakening in Drenica 1878 – 1948”) vol. 2, Pristina, 1997
- “Lufta e Drenicës 1941 – 1945 dhe NDSH në Kosovë deri në vitin 1947” (“The Drenica War 1941 – 1945 and the Albanian National Democratic Movement until 1947”), 2nd ed., Pristina, 1997
- “Sylejman Vuçitërna, martir i demokracisë, komandant i ushtrisë kombëtare” (“Sylejman Vuçitërna, Martyr of Democracy and Commander of the National Army,” co-written with Bardhyl Vuçitërna), Durrës/Pristina, 2000
- “Prof. Ymer Berisha,” monograph, Pristina, 2000
- “Ali Gashi – themelues i Gjimnazit Shqiptar në Gllogoc (Drenas)” (“Ali Gashi – founder of the Albanian Gymnasium in Glogovac [Drenas]”), monograph, Pristina, 2001
- “Qëndrimi i Italisë ndaj çështjes shqiptare 1908 – 1912,” doctoral thesis, Rome/Pristina, 2002
- “Çështje kombëtare dhe klasore ndër shqiptarë nga Lufta e Dytë Botërore deri në ditët tona” (“Nationality and Class Issues among Albanians since World War II”), Pristina, 2003
- “Atdhedashuria e Jasharajve dhe sakrifica e tyre – Adem Jashari” (“The patriotism of the Jashari Family and Their Sacrifice – Adem Jashari”), Pristina, 2004
- “Revolucioni socialist dhe kundërrevolucioni në Kosovë 1941 – 1945 dhe regjimi i pushtetit klasor deri në përmbysjen e tij” (“Socialist Revolution and Counter-Revolution in Kosovo from 1941 – 1945; Plus Outline of Pre-Existing Class System”), Pristina, 2006
