= Pal Kastrioti =

14th century Albanian nobleman

- Ruler of Mat and Dibër

Lord of Mat and Dibër
- Reign: 1389–1407
- Predecessor: Konstantin Kastrioti
- Successor: Gjon Kastrioti
- Died: 1407
- Noble family: Kastrioti
- Issue: Gjon; Aleksandër; Konstantin II
- Father: Konstantin I

Pal or Gjergj Kastrioti was an Albanian medieval ruler in the latter part of the 14th century in northern Albania. Not much is known about his life. He is mentioned in only two historical sources, which describe his rule as extending over a region between Mat and Dibër. His son was Gjon Kastrioti, and his grandson was Skanderbeg, the Albanian national hero.

== In historiography ==
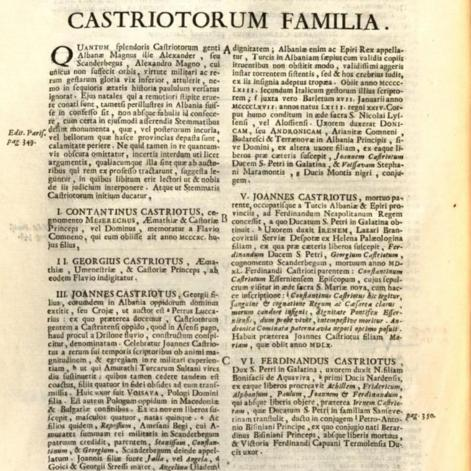
Genealogy of the Kastrioti family, Du Cange (1680), Historia Byzantina duplici commentario

A figure attested as Kastriot of Kanina in southern Albania who appears in a letter sent on September 2, 1368, by Alexander Komnenos Asen to the Ragusan senate has been hypothesised by several authors, mostly in the early 20th century, as an ancestor of the Kastrioti family. Heinrich Kretschmayr argued that this Kastriot may have been Pal Kastrioti, while John Fine considered it "probable" that this Kastriot was an ancestor of Gjon Kastrioti, and Aleks Buda tried to bridge the geographical discrepancy with this theory, wherein Kastriot of Kanina lived in southern Albania while the Kastrioti were active in north-central Albania, by arguing that after the fall of the Balšić, they returned to their ancestral lands in the Dibër valley. In contemporary historiography, the figure recorded as Kastriot of Kanina in 1368 is considered to be unrelated to the Kastrioti family. Compared to other Albanian noble families, the early Kastrioti remain largely absent from historical and archival records until their initial documented appearance

The historical figure of Konstantin Kastrioti Mazreku is attested in Giovanni Andrea Angelo Flavio Comneno's Genealogia diversarum principum familiarum. Angelo mentions Kastrioti as Constantinus Castriotus, cognomento Meserechus, Aemathiae & Castoriae Princeps (Constantinus Castriotus, surnamed Meserechus, Prince of Aemathia and Castoria). Angelo used the cognomen Meserechus about Skanderbeg, and this link to the same name is produced in other sources and reproduced in later ones like Du Cange's Historia Byzantina (1680). These links highlight that the Kastrioti used Mazreku as a name that highlighted their tribal affiliation (farefisni). The name Mazrek(u), which means horse breeder in Albanian, is found throughout all Albanian regions.

Konstantin Kastrioti's son, who was the father of Gjon Kastrioti and grandfather of Gjergj Kastrioti Skanderbeg, appears in two historical sources, Gjon Muzaka's Breve memoria de li discendenti de nostra casa Musachi (1510) and Andrea Angelo's Genealogia diversarum principum familiarum (1603/1610), which was later largely reproduced by Du Cange (1680). Both works, like many contemporary publications about the lineages of nobility, are unreliable as self-contained sources. Angelo constructed ancient mythological lineages which linked Renaissance figures to the age of Constantine the Great, and Muzaka downplayed the importance of other Albanian feudal families, including the Kastrioti. Despite their historical value, both sources are used in comparison to each other and other historical and contemporary research. Angelo calls Gjon Kastrioti's father "Georgius Castriotus" (Gjergj), lord (princeps) of "Aemathiae, Umenestria" (Mat and probably Ujëmisht) and "Castoriae". This toponym has been interpreted as Kastriot, Kastrat in Has, Kastrat in Dibra or the microtoponym "Kostur" near the village of Mazrek in the Has region. Muzaka calls him "Paulo Castrioto" (Pal) and asserts that "he ruled over no more than two villages, called Signa and Gardi Ipostesi" (Sinë and Gardhi i Poshtëm, in Çidhën of Dibër). His first name is disputed. Angelo calls him "Georgius" (Gjergj), and Muzaka calls him "Paulo" (Pal). Neither name can be characterized as the correct version because of an extreme lack of sources. The name "Paulo" (Pal) is mentioned only by one author (Muzaka) and wasn't used as the name of any of his grandsons (Reposh, Konstantin, Stanisha, Gjergj) or great-grandsons (Giorgio, Costantino, Ferrante).

His rule over "only two villages", as described by Muzaka, has been disputed because, if true, it would mean that his son, Gjon Kastrioti, who ruled over a much larger area, rose to power in the span of one generation. This is considered a very unlikely trajectory in the context of Albanian medieval society because noble families had acquired their area of influence over multiple generations in a complex system of affiliation with local village communities and intermarriage with each other. Historian Kristo Frashëri considers it likely that he ruled over his region "in the third quarter of the 14th century" between 1350-75 based on the fact that when his grandson Gjergj Kastrioti was born, his son Gjon had already fathered seven children.

== Sources ==
- Bela, Muhamet (2019). "A ishte Skënderbeu nga Hasi?! - Mendime rreth origjinës së Skënderbeut". In Syla, Sabit; Verli, Marenglen; Asani, Skënder; Berisha, Gjon (eds.). Gjergj Kastrioti - Skënderbeu në 550-vjetorin e vdekjes: (materiale nga Konferenca shkencore ndërkombëtare "Gjergj Kastrioti - Skënderbeu në 550-vjetorin e vdekjes", mbajtur në Prishtinë, më 16 tetor 2018) (PDF) (in Albanian). Institute of history "Ali Hadri". ISBN 978-9951409803.
- Buda, Aleks (1986). Shkrime Historike. Shtëpia Botuese "8 Nëntori". ISBN 9992716517.
- Ducellier, Alain (1981). La façade maritime de l'Albanie au Moyen âge: Durazzo et Valona du XIe au XVe siècle. Ed. de l'Ècole des Hautes Études en Sciences Sociales.
- Fine, John (1994). The Late Medieval Balkans: A Critical Survey from the Late Twelfth Century to the Ottoman Conquest. University of Michigan Press. ISBN 978-0-472-08260-5.
- Hodgkinson, Harry (1999). Scanderbeg: From Ottoman Captive to Albanian Hero. London: Centre for Albanian Studies. ISBN 978-1-873928-13-4.
- Malaj, Edmond (2013). "Familje fisnike të Drishtit mesjetar (Noble Families of Medieval Drivasto". Studime Historike. 3–4.
- Muhaj, Ardian (2015). "Hulumtimi i origjinës së Skënderbeut përmes historisë së jetës dhe veprës së tij". 610-vjetori i lindjes së Heroit Kombëtar Gjergj Kastrioti Skënderbeu. Academy of Sciences of Albania.
- Omari, Jeton (2014). Scanderbeg tra storia e storiografia [Skanderbeg between history and historiography] (PDF) (Thesis). University of Padua.
