= Constantine Kastrioti =

Constantine Kastrioti may refer to:

- Kostandin Kastrioti (d. 1390), great-grandfather of Gjergj Kastrioti Skanderbeg
- Kostandin Kastrioti, son of Pal Kastrioti
- Kostandin Kastrioti, brother of Skanderbeg
- Costantino Castriota (d. 1500), Bishop of Isernia, son of Gjon Kastrioti II
- Costantino Castriota, knight of the Order of Malta, son of Alfonso Granai-Castriota
- Fabio Constantino Castriota (1574 - 1615), son of Pardo Castriota
- Constantino Alessandro Castriota (1616 - 1643)
