= Dibner =

Dibner may refer to:

- Bern Dibner, electrical engineer, industrialist, and historian of science and technology
- Dibner Institute for the History of Science and Technology, a research institute established at MIT

== See also ==
- Diber (disambiguation)
- Diner (disambiguation)
