= Kastriot of Kanina =

Speculated aristocrat or member of House of Kastrioti, based on a single mention in 1368

Kastriot of Kanina is a figure who is mentioned in 1368 in a letter of Alexander Komnenos Asen, ruler of the Principality of Valona to the Republic of Ragusa in relation to the Ragusan citizenship which Asen had acquired. Kastriot must have been an aristocrat in Kanina and is listed as one of the figures which formed Asen's court. The likeness of his name to that of the Kastrioti family, an Albanian noble family which is first mentioned in archival material a few decades later has been a subject of debate. In contemporary historiography, Kastriot of Kanina is considered unrelated to the Kastrioti family.

== History ==
Alexander Komnenos Asen was possibly the son of John Komnenos Asen and succeeded him after 1363. He styled himself as "lord of Kanina and Valona" (Kaninae et Aulonae dominus, in Latin) and probably died in 1371 in the Battle of Maritsa. He maintained extensive diplomatic relations with the Republic of Venice and the Republic of Ragusa as his predecessor. The letter which mentions Kastriot of Kanina was sent by Alexander Komnenos Asen to the Ragusan senate on September 2, 1368. In the letter he thanked the senate for granting him Ragusan citizenship and listed the members of his court as figures who were witnesses to his citizenship oath. Those listed included the two voivodes (military commanders), Prodan and Mikleush, Branilo kephale of Valona, Kastriot of Kanina, Rajče, master of court (dvorodzica), Ujedja, Asen's cup-bearer, logothete Gjurica, the two judges, Stamati and Abrad and other figures. The same apparently multiethnic court must have been in place in the time of John Komnenos Asen.

== In historiography ==
The document is the only to mention a Kastriot of Kanina. It was found and translated by Karl Hopf. His translations contained several mistakes that led him to conclusions which were later corrected. Hopf misidentified Alexander Komnenos Asen as ruler in Valona with an Alexander Giorić. This mistake was noted and corrected early on by Konstantin Jireček. Another mistake by Hopf is the mistranslation of Branilo, kephale of Valona and Kastriot of Kanina. Hopf overlooked the letter "i" ("and") and translated these two names as the single name, Branilo Kastriot, which led him to mistakenly assume that this figure was a progenitor of the Kastrioti. While the idea of a figure named Branilo Kastriot was abandoned, the theory that a Kastriot who governed Kanina in 1368 was an ancestor of the Kastrioti was still put forward by a number of authors mostly in the early 20th century. Heinrich Kretschmayr argued that this Kastriot may have been in fact Pal Kastrioti (died ca. 1400), John Fine considered it "probable" that this Kastriot was an ancestor of Gjon Kastrioti and Aleks Buda tried to bridge the geographical discrepancy between the Kastriot of Kanina who lived in southern Albania and the Kastrioti who were active in north-central Albania by arguing that after the fall of the Balšić, they returned to their ancestral lands in the Dibër valley. In contemporary historiography, the figure recorded as Kastriot of Kanina in 1368 is considered to be unrelated to the Kastrioti family. The Kastrioti remained absent from archival records in comparison to other noble families until their first historical appearance at the end of the 14th century.

== Sources ==
- Babinger, Franz (1992), Mehmed the Conqueror and His Time, Princeton University Press, ISBN 978-0-691-01078-6
- Buda, Aleks (1986). Shkrime Historike. Shtëpia Botuese "8 Nëntori". ISBN 9992716517.
- Ducellier, Alain (1981). La façade maritime de l'Albanie au Moyen âge: Durazzo et Valona du XIe au XVe siècle. Ed. de l'Ècole des Hautes Études en Sciences Sociales.
- Hodgkinson, Harry (1999), Scanderbeg: From Ottoman Captive to Albanian Hero, London: Centre for Albanian Studies, ISBN 978-1-873928-13-4
- Omari, Jeton (2014). Scanderbeg tra storia e storiografia [Skanderbeg between history and historiography] (PDF) (Thesis). University of Padua.
- Petta, Paolo (2000). Despoti d'Epiro e principi di Macedonia: esuli albanesi nell'Italia del Rinascimento. Argo. ISBN 8882340287.
- Soulis, George Christos (1984). The Serbs and Byzantium during the reign of Tsar Stephen Dušan (1331-1355) and his successors. Dumbarton Oaks Library and Collection. ISBN 978-0-88402-137-7.
- Schmitt, Oliver Jens (2001). Das venezianische Albanien (1392-1479). Oldenbourg. ISBN 3486565699.
- Fine, John (1994). The Late Medieval Balkans: A Critical Survey from the Late Twelfth Century to the Ottoman Conquest. University of Michigan Press. ISBN 978-0-472-08260-5.
