= Elez Isufi =

Albanian patriot and military leader

Elez Isuf Ndreu
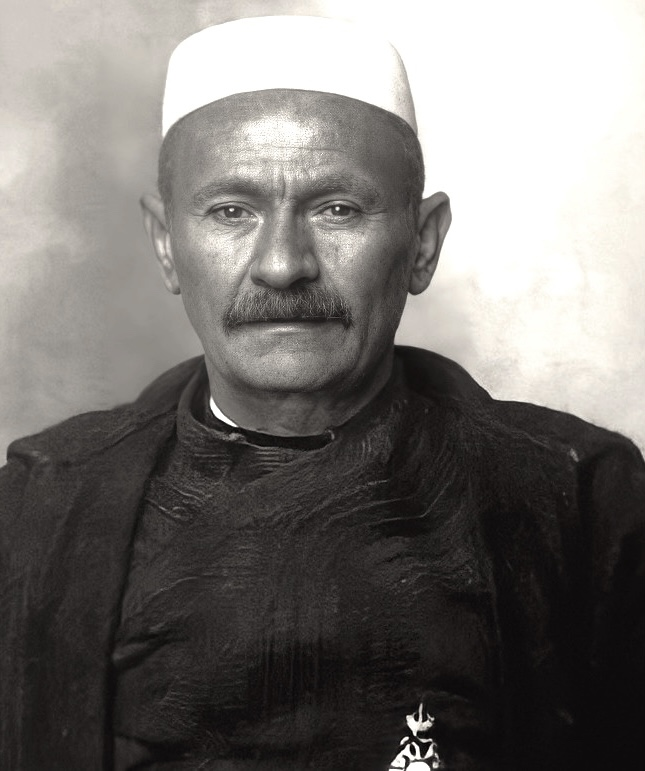

Personal details
- Born: Elez Isuf Ndreu; 1861 Sllovë, Dibër, Albania
- Died: 30 December 1924 (aged 62–63) Peshkopi, Albania
- Cause of death: Killed in Action
- Awards: Military Merit Cross

Military service
- Battles/wars: Albanian revolt of 1912; Kachak Movement; Ohrid-Debar Uprising; Dibran Wars (1912-1921): Uprising in Lumë; War in Dibra (1913); War in Dibra (1915); Battle of Kaush; War in Dibra (1920); Battle of Gëlqere Pass June Revolution Zogist counter-revolution in Albania (1924) †

Elez Isufi, born in 1861, was an Albanian patriot, Kachak and military leader, known for his prominent role in the Albanian resistance against the Kingdom of Serbs, Croats, and Slovenes (later Yugoslavia) in the early 20th century, as part of the Kachak Movement, as well as the democratic uprisings against the regime of Ahmet Zogu in the 1920s.

== Early life ==
Elez Isuf Ndreu was born in the village of Sllove, Dibra in 1861. His family came from the village of Soricë in Zall-Dardhë, but they moved due to economic hardships. Although he himself was uneducated, Isufi advocated for the education of Albanian children and financially sponsored the opening of a school in the local area alongside the teacher Hoxhë Kalla.

== Activities ==
Elez Isufi is active against the Ottoman forces during the Albanian uprisings against the Ottoman Empire. In one clash on 4 May 1912, 11 Ottoman soldiers were left dead or wounded by Isufi's unit of fighters. Isufi and his band of guerrilla fighters resisted the advances of Serbian troops in 1912, and he led reinforcements of Albanian fighters from Dibër at the Battle of Luma. After the Albanian Declaration of Independence, Isufi supported the new Albanian government that was headed by Ismail Qemali, aligning himself with figures such as Hasan Prishtina, Isa Boletini and Bajram Curri. Isufi and a number of fellow chieftains from Dibra did not join forces with Essad Pasha Toptani out of their loyalty to the Albanian government. Due to the fact that many Albanian-inhabited territories remained under the control of occupying forces, a general uprising was planned in 1913, spear-headed by figures that included Elez Isufi.

=== World War I ===
Aside from his leading role in the uprising against the Serbian occupation of the years 1912-1913, Isufi also took part in the organisation and leadership of a subsequent uprising in 1915. During the First World War, Isufi supported the Austro-Hungarians alongside many other Albanians, but he distanced himself from the Bulgarians due to their expansionist ambitions on Albanian-inhabited territories. To strengthen the Austro-Hungarian ties with the Albanians, the Austro-Hungarian emperor Franz Joseph awarded Isufi with the Order of Franz Joseph in recognition for his exceptional fighting against the Serbs.

=== Kachak Movement ===
After the conclusion of World War I, the Serbs attempted to annex Dibër, where they were met with an Albanian resistance led by Elez Isufi and Hazis Kotarja.

Elez Isufi was a leader of the Committee for the National Defence of Kosovo, which sought to liberate Kosovo and other Albanian-inhabited regions from Serbian occupation. This committee organised and supported a series of Albanian uprisings in Albanian-populated territories in Kosovo, Macedonia and Sanxhak from 1919 to 1927 as part of the Kachak Movement.

After the conclusion of World War I, the Serbs attempted to annex Dibër, where they were met with Albanian resistance led by Elez Isufi and Hazis Kotarja. The uprising in Dibër, which lasted from August/September 1920 until December 1921, was organised during a meeting of the Dibran leaders in the village of Arras near Pëshkopi under the guidance of Elez Isufi. In the middle of August, the resistance fighters began their campaign by liberating Pëshkopi. As a close ally of fellow leader Bajram Curri, Isufi led yet another armed uprising in Dibra on 15 August 1921 to free the region from Serbian occupation, and the fighting continued up until December 1921.

When the so-called "Republic of Mirdita" began its uprising with the aid of Serb forces in 1921, Elez Isufi mobilised 1,000 fighters from Reçi, Dardha, Çidhnë and Lurë to fight against the pro-Serb forces and forced a unit of mercenaries to retreat to Arras, leaving them with around 100 dead troops.

=== Uprisings against the Zogist regime ===
Elez Isufi took part in the uprising against the regime of Ahmet Zogu on 1 March 1922, in which Isufi's Dibran fighters were able to occupy Tirana. Isufi supported the Albanian patriot and political activist Fan Noli during the June Revolution of 1924, in which Ahmet Zogu was briefly overthrown by a democratic government before returning from exile with the aid of the Yugoslavs. Isufi was killed whilst fighting against pro-Zogist Yugoslav troops in the end of 1924.

== Legacy ==
Elez Isufi was the father of Cen Elezi, a prominent Albanian resistance fighter of World War II. Due to the constant trouble he posed to Serbian occupation, his Kulla was burnt down three times by Serb forces.
