= 1948 Albanian National Championship =

Albanian National Championship
- Season: 1948
- Champions: Partizani

The 1948 Albanian National Championship was the eleventh season of the Albanian National Championship, the top professional league for association football clubs, since its establishment in 1930.

== Overview ==
It was contested by 14 teams, and Partizani won the championship.

== Regular season ==
=== Group A ===
Pos	Team	Pld	W	D	L	GF	GA	GR	Pts	Qualification	PAR	VLL	17N	YIK	BES	DIN
1	Partizani (C)	10	8	1	1	34	8	4.250	17	Qualification for the final		1–0	4–1	9–0	6–1	7–0
2	Vllaznia	10	8	1	1	26	7	3.714	17		4–1		1–0	2–0	6–0	4–1
3	17 Nëntori	9	4	2	3	9	9	1.000	10		1–2	0–0		1–0	3–1	1–0
4	Ylli i Kuq Durrës	9	3	2	4	12	16	0.750	8		1–1	1–2	0–0		6–1	1–0
5	Besa	9	0	1	8	7	33	0.212	1		0–1	2–5	1–2	0–3		1–1
6	Dinamo Korça	7	0	1	6	3	18	0.167	1		0–2	1–2	—	—	—	

Source: RSSSF.org
(C) Champions

Note: '17 Nëntori' is SK Tirana, 'Ylli i Kuq Durrës' is KS Teuta Durrës and 'Dinamo Korça' is Skënderbeu

=== Group B ===
Pos	Team	Pld	W	D	L	GF	GA	GR	Pts	Qualification or relegation	FLA	BAS	APO	SHQ	8NË	TRA	TOM	SPA
1	Flamurtari	14	8	4	2	47	19	2.474	20	Qualification for the final		1–1	6–2	5–0	5–1	5–1	5–3	9–0
2	Bashkimi Elbasanas	14	7	5	2	34	15	2.267	19		1–0		3–1	2–2	5–0	6–1	3–3	6–0
3	Apolonia	14	7	5	2	31	20	1.550	19		2–2	1–1		4–0	1–1	4–1	4–0	2–0
4	Shqiponja (R)	14	6	4	4	31	23	1.348	16	Relegation to the 1949 Kategoria e Dytë	4–1	1–1	0–1		2–2	3–1	3–0	7–0
5	8 Nëntori	14	5	5	4	23	25	0.920	15		1–4	2–0	0–0	2–2		0–0	5–1	4–2
6	Traktori (R)	14	4	2	8	22	34	0.647	10	Relegation to the 1949 Kategoria e Dytë	2–2	0–1	2–4	1–3	2–0		2–1	5–2
7	Tomori (R)	14	3	3	8	18	32	0.563	9	Relegation to the 1949 Kategoria e Dytë	0–0	0–2	1–2	0–2	0–2	2–1		3–1
8	Spartak Kuçova (R)	14	1	2	11	17	55	0.309	4	Relegation to the 1949 Kategoria e Dytë	1–2	1–4	3–3	3–2	1–3	1–3	2–2	

Source: RSSSF.org
(R) Relegated

Note: 'Bashkimi Elbasanas' is KS Elbasani, 'Shqiponja' is Luftëtari, '8 Nëntori' is Erzeni, 'Traktori' is KS Lushnja and 'Spartak Kuçova' is Naftëtari

== Final ==
25 August 1948

Partizani	6–2	Flamurtari
Biçaku 25'; Gjinali 29', 43', 56', 72'; Shaqiri 74'		Bezhani 8'; Daija 88'

Qemal Stafa Stadium, Tirana

== Interrupted Championship 1948-49 ==
In 1948 the AFA decided to employ a new formula for the championship, according to the 'western' calendar. For the first time in history, Albania's championship style would be compared to that of Western European countries, from autumn 1948-spring 1949; but on 31 March 1949, the Federata Sportive Shqiptare (Albanian Sports Federation) annulled the 1948-49 season under Soviet pressure. After disassociating itself from all Soviet influences (3 December 1961), Albania started a fall/spring season from 1962/63 on.

Table at abandonment:

Pos	Team	Pld	W	D	L	GF	GA	GR	Pts
1	Partizani	6	5	1	0	26	2	13.000	11
2	Tirana	6	4	1	1	10	4	2.500	9
3	Shkodra	5	4	0	1	21	1	21.000	8
4	Durrësi	6	3	1	2	8	7	1.143	7
5	Kavaja	5	1	1	3	10	11	0.909	3
6	Korça	4	1	0	3	7	10	0.700	2
7	Elbasani	6	0	2	4	5	27	0.185	2
8	Vlora	6	0	2	4	2	27	0.074	2

Source: RSSSF.org

NB: apart from the last round, the matches Korça vs Kavaja and Korça vs Shkodra were not played.

All the police (Dinamo) and trade union (Spartaku) clubs changed their name to simply the town name, apart from Partizani and Dinamo Tirana.
