= Gur i Zi (disambiguation) =

Gur i Zi may refer to:

- Black Peak, Šar Mountains or Gur i Zi, a peak of the Šar Mountains in Kosovo and the Republic of Macedonia
- Guri i Zi, Shkodër, a municipality in the Shkodër County, northwestern Albania
- Gur i Zi, Dibër, a village in the municipality Arras, eastern Albania
- Gur i Zi, Elbasan, a village in the municipality Labinot-Mal, central Albania
