= Diner (disambiguation) =

Diner is a type of North American restaurant.

Diner may also refer to:

- A diner, a person who dines or eats
- A dining car on a train, a restaurant

== Games ==
- Diner, 1987 video game by INTV Corporation and sequel to BurgerTime
- Diner (pinball), 1990 arcade game

== Films ==
- Diner (1982 film), an American film written and directed by Barry Levinson
- Diner (2019 film), a Japanese film directed by Mika Ninagawa, based on a novel by Yumeaki Hirayama

== People ==
- Dan Diner (born 1946), an Israeli-German historian and political writer
- Helen Diner (1874–1948), an Austrian writer
- Diners, the stage name of guitar pop musician Blue Broderick

== Other uses ==
- Andorran diner, commemorative coin of Andorra
- Diners Club, credit card company
- Unscrupulous diner's dilemma, in game theory

== See also ==
- Dinner
