= Ymer Berisha =

Secondary-school teacher in Prishtina

- Born: May 13, 1912
- Died: July 11, 1946 (aged 34)
- Occupation: Teacher

Ymer Berisha (May 13, 1912 – July 11, 1946) was an Albanian secondary-school teacher in Prishtina and was made head of the anticommunist Besa Kombëtare organization in Kosovo in the final months of the Second World War. In late October 1945, he sent this memorandum to Brigadier General Hodgson, head of the British Military Mission in Albania, in an appeal for help in their futile struggle against the advancing communist partisans. No assistance was forthcoming, and anticommunist forces in Kosovo were soon overwhelmed and annihilated.

== Biography ==
He was born on May 13, 1912, in the village of Gjurgjevik I Madh, in Prekoruba, Dukagjini Plain, the son of Shaban Berisha and the Phase of Jetish Tafili from Turicefc, Drenica. After his father had killed the mayor of Zllakuqan, Den Ribaç, he was forced to cross into the territory of the Albanian state together with his family, when Ymeri was still 7 years old.

At first they settled in Krumë and then in Fushë Krujë, where Ymeri attended primary school and then Elbasan High School in 1932. Further with a scholarship from the Albanian state he attended high school in Italy, where he graduated in History and Geography at the Faculty of Natural Sciences of the University of Florence in 1936. He further enrolled at the Military Academy of Rome, from where he graduated with the rank of major infantry. It is reported that he also went to the Sorbonne to study philology, but it is not known how long he stayed.

With the Italian occupation of Albania, he returned and worked as a teacher in the villages of Fushë Krujë, Kukës, Peshkopi, Lushnja, and Berat. In all these localities he formed museum collections, collected archeological material, collected and published folklore material in the magazine "Visaret e Kombit".

After the occupation of Yugoslavia by Nazi Germany and the entry of the Albanian administration into the Liberated Lands, in 1941 the normal "Sami Frashëri" was opened in Prishtina. There Berisha taught Albanian language, literature, and history. On September 12, 1943, he founded the political and military organization "Besa Kombëtare" with the aim of uniting all Albanian lands.

From November 1944 he went underground, formed the organization "Besa national" and became known as the ideologue of the armed resistance for the protection of borders and the unification of Albanian lands. After the gradual German withdrawal, Berisha worked to hold assemblies to coordinate actions to combat the communist threat. After activity in the villages of Gjakova, on July 10, 1946, in the mountains of Herec in Gjakova, surrounded by the forces of the so-called "Yugoslav People's Defense and Militia", he was killed on his way to the V Congress. of the ONDSH, held in Lipovica.

Together with the escort, they make resistance, to get out of the siege. By prof. Ymer Berisha was killed along with 8 patriots, and 12 others were seriously injured. Teacher Fehmi Kura was killed along with them.
