= Konstantin Kastrioti (died 1390) =

14th century Albanian nobleman, the first documented of his line

Konstantin I Kastrioti
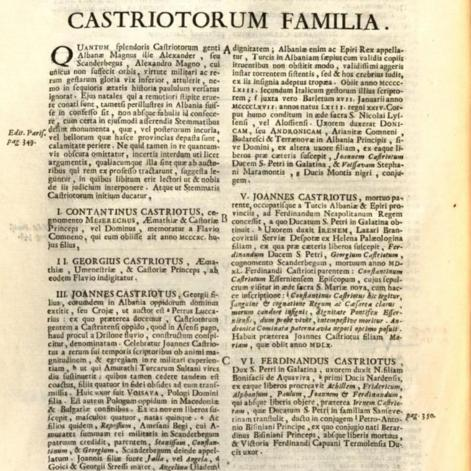
- Genealogy of the Kastrioti family by Du Cange in 1680 featuring a biography of Konstantin I.

Prince of Mat
- Reign: ???-1390
- Successor: Pal Kastrioti
- Other names: Constantine; Constantinus
- Noble family: House of Kastrioti
- Issue: Pal Kastrioti

Kostandin Kastrioti Mazreku (died ca. 1390) was an Albanian regional ruler in parts of the wider Mat and Dibër areas. He is the first Kastrioti to be known by his full name and the progenitor of all members of the family. His son was Pal Kastrioti (also attested with other names), grandfather of the Albanian national hero, Skanderbeg.

== Historiography ==
The historical figure of Kostandin Kastrioti Mazreku is attested in Giovanni Andrea Angelo Flavio Comneno's Genealogia diversarum principum familiarum . The mythological ancient lineages produced by Angelo in his writings are fictional constructions, which he wrote in the context of the Sacred Military Constantinian Order of Saint George, but medieval biographies are considered reliable as they are corroborated and reproduced in others sources and have been compared with archival material in contemporary research. Angelo mentions Kastrioti as Constantinus Castriotus, cognomento Meserechus, Aemathiae & Castoriae Princeps (Constantinus Castriotus, surnamed Meserechus, Prince of Aemathia and Castoria. Angelo used the cognomen Meserechus in reference to Skanderbeg and this link to the same name is produced in other sources and reproduced in later ones like Du Cange's Historia Byzantina (1680). The term princeps is generally used in the context of "ruler", not as a specific title and highlights that he was a ruler in a region which included parts of the wider Mat ("Aemathia") and "Kastoria" (interpreted as a location between Has and Dibra) areas, the power base of the Kastrioti family in the time of Gjon and Gjergj Kastrioti (better known as Skanderbeg). In relation to the toponym "Kastoria", Kastriot, Kastrat in Has, Kastrat in Dibra or the microtoponym "Kostur" near the village of Mazrek in the Has region has been suggested as a possible location. The cognomen Meserechus (Mazreku) has been a subject of interest in historiography as it links the Kastrioti family to a Mazreku tribe (fis) as one of its branches/brotherhoods.

These links highlight that the Kastrioti used Mazreku as a name that highlighted their tribal affiliation (farefisni). They don't indicate, however, that the name was ever used as a "second surname". The name Mazrek(u), which means horse breeder in Albanian, is found throughout all Albanian regions. The various geographical links of the Kastrioti to one particular Mazrek settlement are difficult to establish with certainty as the toponym appears in widespread diffusion across many subregions historically related to the family. A Mazrek(u) settlement linked to the Kastrioti appears near medieval Drisht, where even in the 17th century two figures named Kastrioti appear: a Pjetër Kastrioti and his daughter, Ana Katerina Kastrioti. Historian Paolo Petta has noted that the links to the historical Kastrioti family are preserved in the oral traditions of the Mazreku tribe in northern Albania.

== Sources ==
- Bela, Muhamet (2019). "A ishte Skënderbeu nga Hasi?! - Mendime rreth origjinës së Skënderbeut". In Syla, Sabit; Verli, Marenglen; Asani, Skënder; Berisha, Gjon (eds.). Gjergj Kastrioti - Skënderbeu në 550-vjetorin e vdekjes: (materiale nga Konferenca shkencore ndërkombëtare "Gjergj Kastrioti - Skënderbeu në 550-vjetorin e vdekjes", mbajtur në Prishtinë, më 16 tetor 2018) (PDF) (in Albanian). Institute of history "Ali Hadri". ISBN 978-9951409803.
- Frashëri, Kristo (2002), Gjergj Kastrioti Skënderbeu: jeta dhe vepra, 1405–1468 (in Albanian), Botimet Toena, ISBN 99927-1-627-4
- Malaj, Edmond (2013). "Familje fisnike të Drishtit mesjetar (Noble Families of Medieval Drivasto". Studime Historike. 3–4.
- Petta, Paolo (2000). Despoti d'Epiro e principi di Macedonia: esuli albanesi nell'Italia del Rinascimento. Argo. ISBN 8882340287.
