= Bashkim Lala Sports Palace =

Sporting arena in Peshkopi, Albania

- Interactive map of Bashkim Lala Sports Palace
- Full name: Pallati Sportit Bashkim Lala
- Former names: Pallati Sportit Peshkopi
- Coordinates: 41°40′54.2″N 20°25′35.4″E
- Owner: Municipality of Peshkopi
- Capacity: 2,000
- Surface: Parquet Floor

Construction
- Renovated: 2009

Tenant
- KS Korabi

Bashkim Lala Sports Palace is an indoor sporting arena located in Peshkopi, Albania. On 21 June 2009 the Prime Minister of Albania at the time Sali Berisha inaugurated the reconstruction of the sports palace with a budget of 7,000,000 lek, which was equivalent to €53,810 at the time. In 2013 a campaign was started by the citizens of Peshkopi to name the sports palace after the secretary of the city's multidisciplinary sports club KS Korabi, and this was approved by the municipality a year later.
