= Coat of arms of Andorra =

- Armiger: Josep-Lluís Serrano Pentinat, Co-Prince of Andorra; Emmanuel Macron, Co-Prince of Andorra
- Adopted: 1993 (officially)
- Shield: Quarterly: first Gules, a crosier bendways sinister surmounted by a mitre Or lined Argent (Bishop of Urgell); second Or, three pallets Gules (Count of Foix); third Or, four pallets Gules (Catalonia); fourth Or, two cows passant in pale Gules horned and collared Azure (Viscount of Béarn).
- Motto: Virtus Unita Fortior ("United virtue is stronger")
- Other elements: A console or

The coat of arms of Andorra (Catalan: Escut d'Andorra) is the heraldic device consisting of a shield divided quarterly by the arms of the Bishop of Urgell and the Count of Foix – who have historically been the two co-princes of Andorra – in addition to the emblems of Catalonia and the Viscount of Béarn. Utilized unofficially since the Middle Ages, its status as the coat of arms of the Principality of Andorra was formalized in 1993 upon the implementation of their new constitution. The escutcheon is featured on the flag of Andorra.

== Official description ==
Andorran law describes the coat of arms as follows:

The coat of arms of the Principality of Andorra has been traditionally formed by four quarters, two of which are the ones of the two Co-Princes. The four traditional quarters are:

- 1) that of the Bishopric, represented by a golden mitre and a golden crosier on a red background;
- 2) that of Foix;
- 3) that of Catalonia;
- 4) that of Béarn.

The arms can have at the bottom the motto "Virtus Unita Fortior". The arms can have an aureola, a scroll, or it can be crowned by the lord's emblems (crown, chapeau).

== History ==
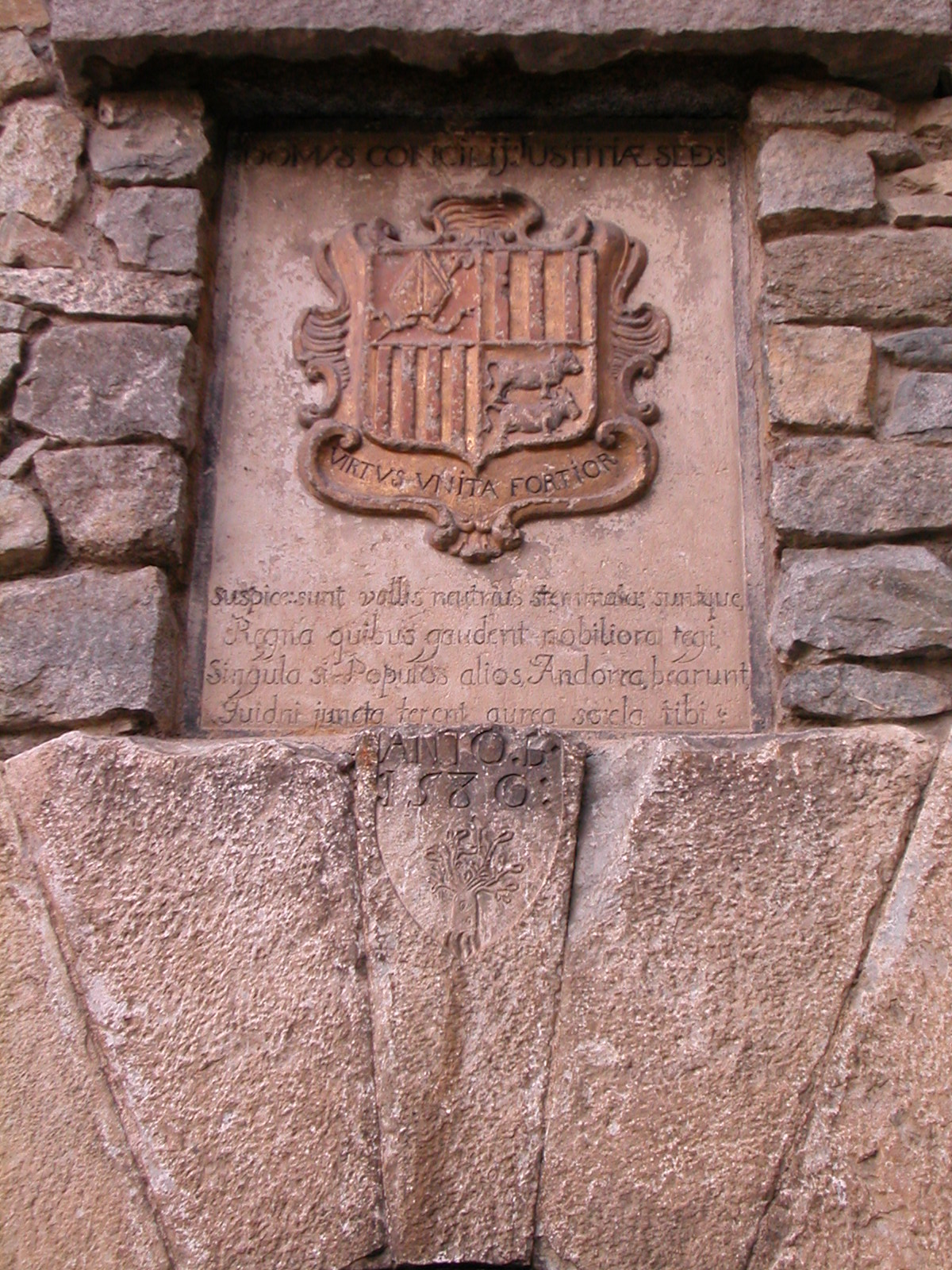
The coat of arms featured on the exterior of the Casa de la Vall

The usage of the arms of the Bishop of Urgell and the Count of Foix stems originates from a settlement made in 1278 concerning territory sandwiched between the lands they had jurisdiction over. The two parties agreed to protect the principality jointly as co-princes. The arms of Catalonia and Béarn were added, and a "centuries-old carving" of this four-part quartered emblem is featured on the exterior of the country's parliament building – the Casa de la Vall – which served as the meeting place of the General Council until 2014. It was also found on the lintel of a house in Barcelona dating back to 1761. However, its status was not official until it was designated as the principality's coat of arms under Article 2(2) of the Constitution of Andorra, which was approved in a 1993 referendum and came into force that same year.

== Design ==
=== Construction ===
The four shields depicted on the coat of arms
Arms	Position	Explanation
	Top left	The arms of the Bishop of Urgell, who is one of the two co-princes of Andorra.
	Top right	The arms of the Count of Foix, the historical co-prince of Andorra who is currently represented by the President of France.
	Bottom left	The arms of Catalonia
	Bottom right	The arms of the Viscounts of Béarn, the historical feudal lords of Andorra. The arms consist of 2 Béarnaise cows.

=== Symbolism ===
The top two quarters depict the arms of the "two traditional protectors" of the principality – the Count of Foix and the Bishop of Urgell. While the latter title is still extant and its holder continues to rule Andorra as a co-prince, the former was absorbed, first into the title of King of France, and subsequently transferred to the President of France. The quarters at the bottom – of Catalonia and Béarn – allude to the other territories that Andorra has historically been reliant upon. At the bottom is the country's motto in Latin: Virtus Unita Fortior, English: United virtue stronger.

=== Uses ===
The coat of arms is employed on the centre yellow band of the flag of Andorra. It also features extensively on coins minted by Andorra.

== Variations ==
Coat of arms of the High Authorities
Co-Princes and Head of the Government

Coat of arms before the 16th century

Coat of arms, 1580

Ecclesiastical version (for Bishop of Urgell), c. 1800–1959

Coat of arms of the French Co-Prince of Andorra (historical), c. 1870–1959

Coat of arms, c. 1800–1949

Coat of arms (flag version), 1931–1949

Coat of arms, 1949–1959

Coat of arms, 1959–1993

== See also ==
- Flag of Andorra
