= Commemorative coins of Andorra =

The Commemorative coins of Andorra may consist of "diners" denomination or coin sets.

- 10 diners - silver - Mouflon mountain goat - 2002
- 20 diners - bi-metallic Ag/Au - Charlemagne's Coronation - 1996
- 20 diners - bi-metallic Ag/Au - 50th anniversary Universal Declaration of Human Rights - 1998
- 50 diners - bi-metallic Au/Ag - 10th Constitutional anniversary - 2003
- 5 pc. set - bi-metallic Ag/Au - 2000 Olympic Games - 2000
