= List of mayors of Dibër =

This is a list of mayors of Dibër who have served since the Albanian Declaration of Independence of 1912.

== Mayors (1912–present) ==
No.	Name	Term in office		Party
1	Shehat Shehu	1922	1924	
2	Sul Shehu	1924	1924	
3	Adem Isai	1925	1928	
4	Sul Shehu	1928	1934	
5	Saledin Zavalani	1934	1935	
6	Shefqet Çela	1935	1939	
Executive Committee (1944–1992)
7	Kadri Rrapi	1992	1996	PS
8	Mentor Bunguri	1996	2000	PD
9	Bajram Krashi	2000	2003	PS
10	Ilir Krosi	2003	2015	PD
11	Shukri Xhelili	2015	2016	PS
12	Muharrem Rama	2016	2019	PS
13	Dionis Imeraj	2019	2021	PS
14	Shkëlqim Murrja (acting)	2021	2022	PS
15	Rahim Spahiu	2022		PS

== See also ==
- Politics of Albania
