= Albanian National Democratic Movement =

Albanian National Democratic Movement, known by its Albanian initials as LNDSH or NDSH, became a near-total anti-communist resistance in Kosovo between 1945 and 1947.

== History ==
LNDSH drew some of its members from among the functionaries of the former pro-Axis Albanian occupation regime, but since the insurrection became general, embracing almost the entire Kosovar Albanian population, numerous Kosovar Albanian Partisans were quickly drawn to participate in it. Indeed, NDSH represents a unique example of a near-unanimous popular insurrection in Europe, neglected by historians who do not know Albanian sources. It was a genuine collective rebellion encompassing Kosovo and western Macedonia.

Between 1945 and 1947, the NDSH organized three underground congresses. A debate took place in the movement, with one trend favoring relocation of the leaders to Greece and their opponents insisting that the fight continue within Kosovo. In the parlance of later revolutionary movements elsewhere in Europe, these could be described as ‘internal’ and ‘external’ factions. The main ‘internal’ leader, Ajet Gurguri, remained on the scene in Kosovo but was arrested and executed. He was followed in death by Gjon Serreqi, a Catholic patriot, who had been sent to a prison camp by the German SS in 1944. Serreqi had directed the clandestine ND while serving as a teacher in the Sami Frashëri high school in the historic center of Pristina, whose students organized an LNDSh Student Youth Committee.

On 11 March 1945, the Albanian women of Gjakovë went into the streets to protest against the drafting of their menfolk to serve the Yugoslavs in the repression of NDSH.

Many of the women protesters were arrested and received lengthy prison sentences. But one Albanian woman stood out from the others: Marie Shllaku (1922–46), a Catholic schoolteacher born in Shkodër in northern Albania. Shllaku was seriously wounded during fighting. Sheltered by a peasant family, she was discovered and arrested. The Yugoslav police ignored her injuries, beating and otherwise torturing her. She was carried into the courtroom in Prizren, where she was tried. In her last words in court, Shllaku declared, "one day your sons and daughters will be ashamed of your treachery and inhumanity against us and against the whole Albanian people".

During the period when she awaited death, she was heard in her prison cell nightly singing folk songs from Shkodër, as if preparing for her wedding. She was 24 when she was executed late in 1946.

From 1945 the group began engaging Yugoslav troops with guerrilla warfare tactics. In April 1946, they failed to assassinate the pro-Yugoslav Albanian mayor of Pristina, Alush Zariqi. Several attacks also happened in the regions of Llap and Gollak, commanded from the village of Mramor. On 8 August 1946, the NDSH forces were ambushed in between the villages of Billushë and Hoçë e Qytetit, in Prizren. Despite dealing heavy casualties to the Yugoslav forces, under the command of Gjon Serreqi and Ajet Gërguri the Albanian forces bid a tactical retreat. Serreqi hid in a bunker in the village of Shipshanica. Attempting to lure him out, Yugoslav authorities arrested several of his students, however he would stay hidden until 24 February 1947 when he was assassinated by two Yugoslav officers.

Many more LNDSh supporters were imprisoned and killed before the insurrection was completely defeated. Fighting in Kosovo had not ended until 1947; several tens of thousands of Albanians perished in the uprising.
