= Gentian Manuka =

Albanian footballer (born 1991)

Personal information
- Full name: Gentian Manuka
- Date of birth: 2 August 1991 (age 35)
- Place of birth: Peshkopi, Albania
- Height: 1.83 m (6 ft 0 in)
- Position: Attacking midfielder

Youth career
- 2005–2010: Teuta
- 2008–2009: Shkëndija
- 2010–2012: Kavala

Senior career*
Years	Team	Apps	(Gls)
2011–2012	→ Kamza (loan)	22	(2)
2012–2014	Kukësi	20	(1)
2014	→ Kastrioti (loan)	11	(1)
2014	Besa	9	(0)
2015	Besëlidhja	10	(2)
2015–2016	Tërbuni	0	(0)
2016–2017	Kastrioti	14	(0)

International career^{‡}
2009–2010	Albania U19	4	(1)
- * Club domestic league appearances and goals ‡ National team caps and goals as of 12:02, 12 September 2012 (GMT)

Gentian Manuka (born 2 August 1991 in Peshkopi) is an Albanian footballer.

== Club career ==
=== Early career ===
Manuka was born in Peshkopi but moved to and grew up in the seaside city of Durrës, where he began his career with local youth side Shkëndija Durrës. He signed for Greek side Kavala in 2011 but due to problems at the club caused by the Koriopolis (match fixing scandal) Manuka was loaned out to newly promoted Albanian Superliga side KS Kamza for the entire 2011–12 season.
