= Ohrid–Debar uprising =

1913 Bulgarian and Albanian uprising against Serbia

Ohrid–Debar Uprising
- Part of the aftermath of the Second Balkan War
Date	23 September 1913 – 7 October 1913
Location	Vardar Macedonia, Kingdom of Serbia (now North Macedonia)
Result	Serbo–Greek victory

Belligerents
IMRO; Kachaks	Serbia; Greece

Commanders and leaders
Todor Aleksandrov; Isa Boletini; Petar Chaulev; Milan Matov; Sefedin Pustina; Ali Pustina; Ismail Strazimiri; Anton Shibakov; Elez Isufi; Demir Lena; Shemo Merko	(Kingdom of Serbia) Radomir Putnik (Kingdom of Serbia) Vasilije Trbić (Kingdom of Greece) Unknown

Strength
Unknown; 6,000 rebels	(Kingdom of Serbia) 100,000 soldiers (Kingdom of Greece) Unknown

Casualties and losses
- Thousands killed 30,000 Bulgarians fled to Bulgaria; 25,000 Albanians fled to Albania

The Ohrid–Debar uprising (Macedonian: Охридско-Дебaрско вoстание, romanized: Ohridsko-Debarsko vostanie; Bulgarian: Охридско-Дебърско въстание, romanized: Ohridsko-Debarsko vastanie; Albanian: Kryengritja e Ohrit dhe Dibrës) was an uprising by the population in Western Macedonia, then Kingdom of Serbia, in September 1913. It was organized by the Internal Macedonian Revolutionary Organization (IMRO) and Albania against the Serbian capture of the regions of Ohrid, Debar and Struga after the Balkan Wars (1912–13).

== Background ==
The IMRO had discussions with the Albanian revolutionary committee of Sefedin Pustina at Elbasan, Albania, between 12 and 17 August 1913. It was agreed that an uprising would be started against Serbia. A directive dated 21 August planned for a new fighting against Serbia and Greece in Vardar Macedonia and Greek Macedonia. The IMRO leadership decided for a rebellion in Bitola, Ohrid and Debar, and rallied Petar Chaulev, Pavel Hristov, Milan Matov, Hristo Atanasov, Nestor Georgiev, Anton Shibakov, Ismail Strazimiri and others in those regions.

== Events ==
The rebellion started only two months after the end of the Second Balkan War. The insurgency sought to challenge Serb control of the region. During the conflict, the Hellenic Army assisted Serb troops to quash the uprising. The suppression of the uprising resulted in heavy use of violence by Serb forces. Scholar Edvin Pezo states that depictions of Albanians as 'uncultured' and ‘primitive’ by Serb nationalists of the time were a possible reason for the extensive violence perpetrated upon Albanians during the First Balkan War and subsequent Ohrid–Debar uprising. The defeat of the uprising by Serb forces resulted in tens of thousands of Albanian refugees arriving in Albania from Western Macedonia.

== CEIP report ==
According to the International Commission of the Carnegie Endowment for International Peace report, a Serbian army of 100,000 regulars suppressed the uprising. Thousands were killed, and tens of thousands fled to Bulgaria and Albania. Many Bulgarians were imprisoned or shot, a number of Albanian and Bulgarian villages were burned. The number of ethnic Albanian refugees from Macedonia was 25,000.

== Legacy ==
After the 2001 insurgency in Macedonia, Macedonian and Albanian historians discussed the historical cooperation of the two ethnic groups and their joint struggle against their perceived common enemies, including the Serbian government. The 1913 rebellion was the subject of a 2013 conference.

== See also ==
- Tikveš uprising

== Sources ==
- Pearson, Owen (2004). Albania in the Twentieth Century, A History: Volume I: Albania and King Zog, 1908-39. I.B.Tauris. ISBN 978-1-84511-013-0.
- Institut za nacionalna istorija (2000). Историја на македонскиот народ. Институт за национална историја. ISBN 978-9989-624-52-0.
- Rudić, Srđan; Milkić, Miljan, eds. (2013). Balkanski ratovi 1912-1913: Nova viđenja i tumačenja [The Balkan Wars 1912/1913: New Views and Interpretations]. Istorijski institut & Institut za strategijska istrazivanja. ISBN 978-86-7743-103-7.
  - Bjelajac, Mile (June 2013). ...1913. Istorijski institut & Institut za strategijska istrazivanja. pp. 311–332. ISBN 9788677431037.
- Razsukanov, Yosif (16 September 1998). "85 години от Охриско-Дебърското въстание" [85 Years since the Ohrid-Debar Uprising]. Македония [Macedonia] (33).
