= Strezimir, Gostivar =

Strezimir Стрезимир Shtrezimir
- Village
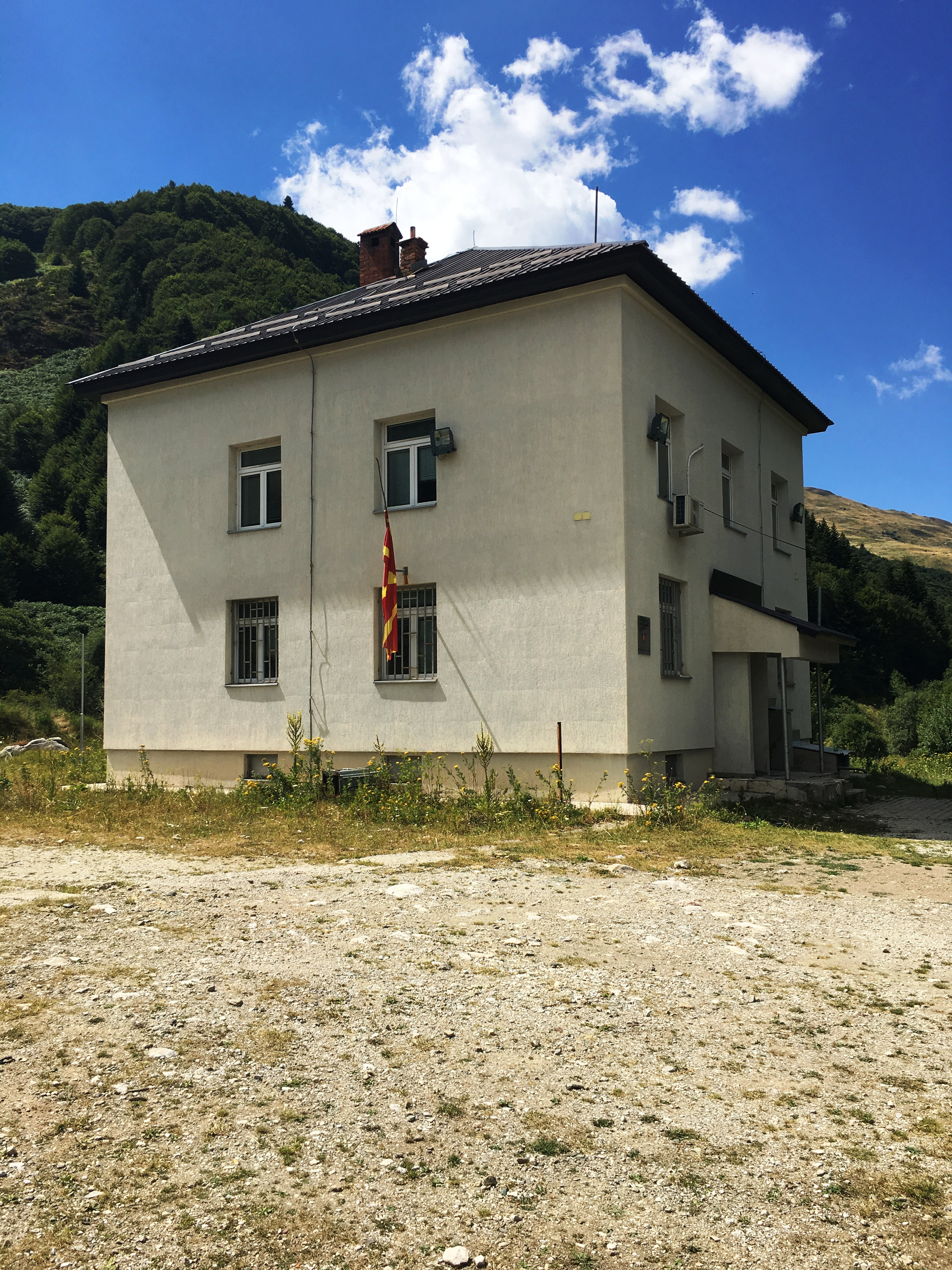

- Location within Macedonia
- Coordinates: 41.806667°N 20.619139°E
- Country: North Macedonia
- Region: Polog
- Municipality: Gostivar

Population (2002)
  - Total: 0
  - Density: 2.22/km^{2} (5.74/sq mi)
- Time zone: UTC+1 (CET)
  - Summer (DST): UTC+2 (CEST)
- Car plates: GV
- Website: .

Strezimir (Macedonian: Стрезимир, Albanian: Shtrezimir) is a historical village in the municipality of Gostivar, North Macedonia. It is part of the region of Upper Reka.

== History ==
Due to uprisings in the Upper Reka region, Strezimir was burned down by Serbian and Bulgarian forces between 1912–1916.

== Demographics ==
Strezimir (Strazimir) appears in the Ottoman defter of 1467 as a village in the ziamet of Reka which was under the authority of Karagöz Bey. The village had a total of 5 households and the anthroponymy recorded depicts an Albanian character.

According to Ethnography of the Adrianople, Monastir and Salonika vilayets, Strezimir in 1873 had 40 households with 136 Orthodox Albanians.

In statistics gathered by Vasil Kanchov in 1900, the village was inhabited by 56 Muslim Albanians and 180 Christian Albanians.

According to the 2002 census, the village had 0 inhabitants.

== Sources ==
- Osmani, Edibe Selimi (2012). Veshja autoktone e femrave të Rekës së Epërme [Authentic clothing of women from Reka e Epërme]. Skopje: Arbëria design. ISBN 9789989578281.
