= Marie Shllaku =

Albanian politician

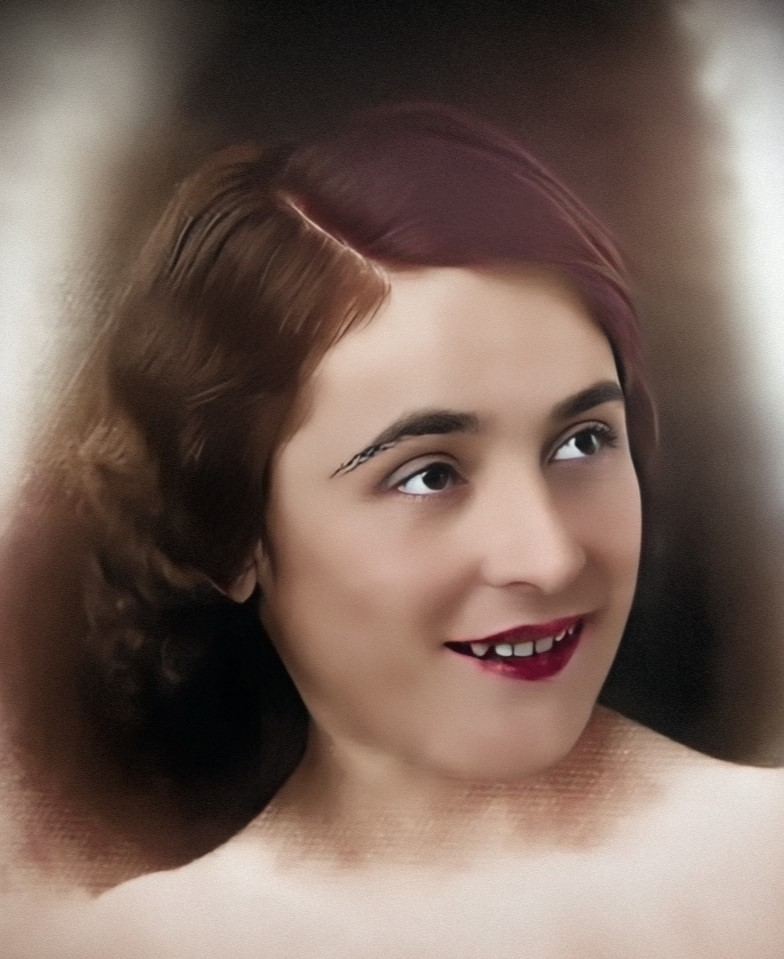
- Portrait of Shllaku in Shkoder
- Born: October 22, 1922; Shkoder, Albania
- Died: September 25, 1946 (aged 23); Prizren, Kosovo
- Cause of death: Tortured and shot by firing squad
- Citizenship: Albanian
- Education: Shkodra Franciscan Girl's High School; Stigmatine Sisters School of Shkodër
- Alma mater: Faculty of Literature and Philosophy, Sapienza University of Rome
- Occupation: Schoolteacher

Marie Shllaku (1922 - 1946), born in Shkodër, Albania, was a prominent Catholic Albanian nationalist, educator, and anti-fascist activist known for her resistance against Serbian and Yugoslav oppression. Educated in Albania and Italy, she became deeply involved in the resistance against Italian and German occupations during World War II. Her activism extended to opposing the Yugoslav communist regime's oppression of Albanians in Kosovo. Captured in 1946 by Yugoslav authorities, Shllaku was subjected to torture and ultimately executed. Her steadfast commitment to Albanian independence and rights has made her a lasting symbol of resistance and martyrdom in Albanian history.

== Early life and education ==
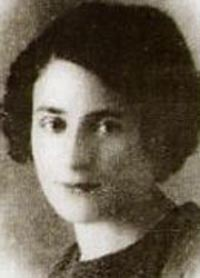
Photograph o Shllaku in Shkoder

Marie Shllaku was born on October 22, 1922, in the Badra neighborhood of Shkodër, Albania, to Mark Simon and Dila, a family originally from Palajt in Dukagjin. She displayed an early aptitude for academics, completing her primary and secondary education at the Stigmatine Sisters School of Shkodër and Shkodra Franciscan Girl's High School. Marie pursued higher education at the Faculty of Literature and Philosophy in Rome.

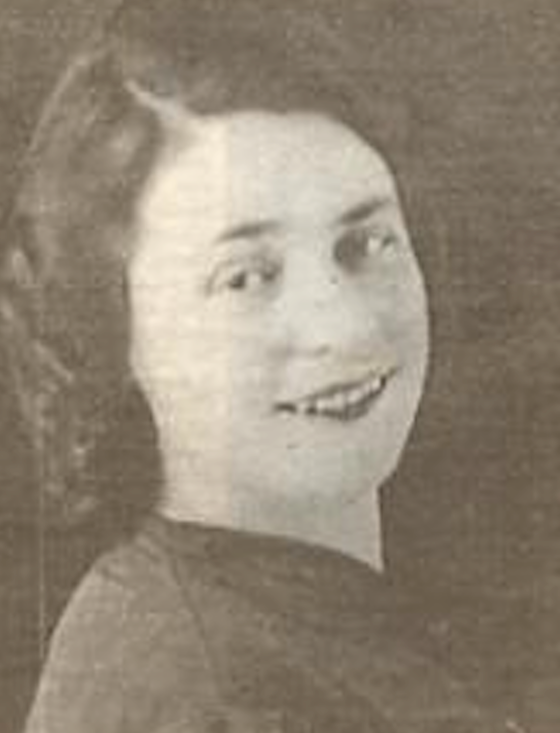
Portrait of Marie Shllaku

Her studies, however, were interrupted by the onset of World War II, forcing her to return to Albania. Upon her return, she began working as a secretary in the Ministry of Public Works. Her career took a significant turn on February 25, 1943, when she was appointed as the finance inspector for Kosovo. This role placed her in a pivotal position during a tumultuous period, setting the stage for her later involvement in nationalist movements and resistance activities.

== Resistance activities and post-war activism ==
=== World War II resistance ===
During World War II, Shllaku actively participated in the resistance against Italian and German occupations in Albania. In 1944, she joined the National Democratic Movement of Albania (NDSH), connecting with notable fighters like Shaban Polluzha and Mehmet Gradica. Her involvement in the NDSH was crucial as she played a key role in organizing resistance efforts and maintaining communication among various factions fighting for Albanian independence. In September 1944, Shllaku was arrested by German forces but was released through the intervention of Xhafer Deva, a prominent Albanian nationalist. After her release, she continued her resistance activities, this time focusing on combating the Yugoslav communist forces. She collaborated with other nationalist figures such as Ndue Përllesh and Ukë Sadiku, further solidifying her position as a significant leader within the Albanian nationalist movement.

=== Political involvement ===
In 1946, Marie Shllaku's relentless activism led to her arrest by Yugoslav authorities. She was subjected to severe torture before being sentenced to death. On the night of November 24–25, 1946, she was executed in Prizren along with other prominent Albanian nationalists, including At Bernard Llupi, Kolë Parubi, and Gjergj Martini. Her execution was part of a broader campaign to suppress Albanian nationalist movements. Despite her tragic end, Marie Shllaku is remembered as a martyr and symbol of Albanian resistance, her legacy enduring as a testament to her unwavering dedication to her people and her cause.

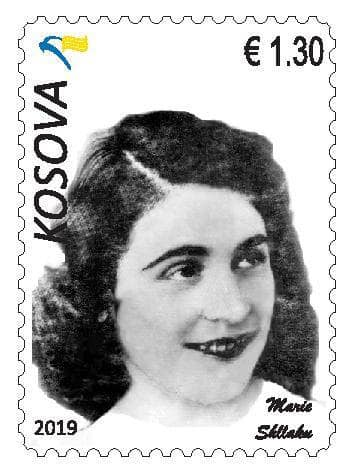
Kosovo postage stamp of Marie Shllaku from 2019

=== Imprisonment and execution ===
In 1946, Marie Shllaku's relentless activism led to her arrest by Yugoslav authorities. She was subjected to severe torture before being sentenced to death. On the night of November 24–25, 1946, she was executed in Prizren along with other prominent Albanian nationalists, including At Bernard Llupi, Kolë Parubi, and Gjergj Martini. Her execution was part of a broader campaign to suppress Albanian nationalist movements. Despite her tragic end, Marie Shllaku is remembered as a martyr and symbol of Albanian resistance, her legacy enduring as a testament to her unwavering dedication to her people and her cause.

== Legacy ==
Marie Shllaku's legacy is recognized for her active role in the resistance against Italian, German, and Yugoslav communist forces. As a leader within the National Democratic Movement of Albania, she significantly contributed to the Albanian nationalist cause. Her execution in 1946 solidified her status as a martyr, and she is remembered for her commitment to Albanian independence. Her story continues to inspire future generations in Albania and Kosovo in their pursuit of national identity. Her last words, "Kosovë, gjaku im t’u bëftë dritë!" ("Kosovo, may my blood be light to you!"), highlight her enduring dedication to her cause.
