= 1948–49 Kategoria e Dytë =

Kategoria e Dytë
- Season: 1948–49
- Champions: Annulled

The 1948–49 Kategoria e Dytë was to be the sixth season of the second tier of football in Albania. The league began on 3 October 1948 but it was annulled on 31 March 1949 meaning there was no winner. On 3 October 1948 the Albanian Football Association relaunched the top two tiers using a western format where the season was to run between fall and spring, but on 31 March 1949 the championships were annulled following Soviet pressure.

== League table ==
Pos	Team	Pld	W	D	L	GF	GA	GD	Pts
1	Partizani B	5	5	0	0	25	5	+20	10
2	Fieri	6	4	0	2	20	5	+15	8
3	Shijaku	5	4	0	1	21	8	+13	8
4	Lushnja	6	3	1	2	8	10	−2	7
5	Gjirokastra	4	2	1	1	12	8	+4	5
6	Spartaku Kuçovë	6	1	0	5	6	25	−19	2
7	Patosi	6	1	0	5	9	34	−25	2
8	Berati	4	0	0	4	2	8	−6	0
