= Andorran diner =

Commemorative currency of Andorra

Diner andorrà (Catalan)
- 10 andorran diners

Unit
- Symbol: D.

Denominations
- Subunit
- 1/100: cèntims

Demographics
- User(s): Andorra^{1}

Valuation
- Pegged with: French franc (1:5) and Spanish peseta (1:100)^{2} euro (1:0.75)
- ^{1} Not legal tender. Intended for collectors only.^{2} Informal exchange rate (never officially fixed)

The Andorran diner (ADD) is a commemorative currency issued in form of coins intended for collectors and without a legal tender value. A diner is divided into 100 cèntims. The name diner ("money" in Catalan) is derived from the Roman currency denarius.

The Servei d'Emissions de la Vegueria Episcopal has issued from 1977 onwards various series of diner denominated coins. Previously there were minor privately issued diner coinage (with no legal value). There have been silver, golden and bimetallic issues. The most commemorated topic is Charlemagne.

The exchange rate was defined (informally) as 100 ESP (0.60 EUR) or 5 FRF (about 130 ESP or 0.75 EUR) to one diner. But there is no bank or other authority where visitors to Andorra can change diners for euros. It is only an informal relation. It is not possible to buy anything with diners in Andorra. It is not possible to open an account in diners. It is only an artificial currency to produce commemorative coins.

In 1998 the General Council of the Valleys issued for the first time a series of diner denominated coins to commemorate the 250th anniversary of the Manual Digest.

Coins of the Andorran diner (examples)
Image	Value	Technical parameters				Description			Date of first minting
Image	Value	Diameter	Thickness	Mass	Composition	Edge	Obverse	Reverse	Date of first minting
	1 cèntim	22 mm	1.75 mm	1.25 g	Aluminium	Plain/Smooth	Crown and laurel wreath; text "JOAN D.M. BISBE D'URGELL I PRINCEP D'ANDORRA", "1 CÈNTIM", "1999"	Angel carrying a wheatsheaf; text "FAO ALIMENTS GARANTITS PEL SEGLE XXI"	1999
	1 cèntim	18 mm		2.8 g	Brass	Reeded	Coat of arms of Andorra; text "PRINCIPAT D'ANDORRA", "1 ct.", "2005"	Two Findern flowers (Narcissus poeticus); text "GRANDALLA"	2005
	1 cèntim	21 mm	1.85 mm	4.5 g	Brass	Plain/Smooth	Coat of arms of Andorra; text "PRINCIPAT D'ANDORRA", "1 ct.", "2013"	Male Eurasian Capercaillie (Grouse); text "GALL FER"	2013
	2 cèntims	21.3 mm		4 g	Brass	Reeded	Coat of arms of Andorra; text "PRINCIPAT D'ANDORRA", "2 ct.", "2005"	Pyrenean Chamois; text "ISARD"	2005
	2 cèntims	22 mm	1.75 mm	4.324 g	Brass	Plain/Smooth	Coat of arms of Andorra; text "PRINCIPAT D'ANDORRA", "2 ct.", "2013"	Findern flowers (Narcissus poeticus); text "GRANDALLA"	2013
	5 cèntims	24.5 mm		5.5 g	Brass	Reeded	Coat of arms of Andorra; text "PRINCIPAT D'ANDORRA", "5 ct.", "2005"	Wall painting at Santa Coloma church: winged mythological animals surround central religious figure; text "SANTA COLOMA FRAGMENT PICTÒRIC"	2005
	5 cèntims	23 mm	1.80 mm	5 g	Brass	Plain/Smooth	Coat of arms of Andorra; text "PRINCIPAT D'ANDORRA", "5 ct.", "2013"	Pont de la Margineda bridge: text "PONT DE LA MARGINEDA"	2013
	10 cèntims	22.2 mm		6.5 g	Cupronickel	Plain/Smooth	Coat of arms of Andorra; text "PRINCIPAT D'ANDORRA", "10 ct.", "2005"	Saint Vicent's d'Enclar church; text "SANT VICENÇ D'ENCLAR"	2005
	10 cèntims	25 mm	2.20 mm	7 g	Cupronickel	Reeded	Coat of arms of Andorra; text "PRINCIPAT D'ANDORRA", "10 ct.", "2013"	Mural painting at Sant Cristòfol d'Anyós; text "PINTURA MURAL SANT CRISTÒFOL D'ANYÓS"	2013
	25 cèntims	24.2 mm		7.75 g	Cupronickel	Plain/Smooth	Coat of arms of Andorra; text "PRINCIPAT D'ANDORRA", "25 ct.", "2005"	Sanctuary of Our Lady of Meritxell; text "SANTUARI DE MERITXELL"	2005
	25 cèntims	25.4 mm	2.15 mm	7.7 g	Cupronickel	Plain/Smooth	Coat of arms of Andorra; text "PRINCIPAT D'ANDORRA", "25 ct.", "2013"	Mouflon; text "MUFLÓ"	2013
	50 cèntims	25.9 mm		8.8 g	Cupronickel	Plain/Smooth	Coat of arms of Andorra; text "PRINCIPAT D'ANDORRA", "50 ct.", "2005"	Map of Andorra; texts "ORDINO", "CANILLO", "LA MASSANA", "ENCAMP", "ESCALDES ENGORDANY", "ANDORRA LA VELLA", "SANT JULIÀ DE LÒRIA", "ANDORRA"	2005
	50 cèntims	28 mm	2.10 mm	8.8 g	Cupronickel	Plain/Smooth	Coat of arms of Andorra; text "PRINCIPAT D'ANDORRA", "50 ct.", "2013"	Portrait of Charlemagne with crown and sword; text "CARLEMANY"	2013
	1 diner	24.5 mm		8.5 g	Bi-metallic coin (Brass center plug with a cupronickel outer ring)	Reeded	Coat of arms of Andorra; text "PRINCIPAT D'ANDORRA", "1 D.", "2005"	Our Lady of Meritxell; text "MARE DE DÉU DE MERITXELL"	2005
	1 diner	38.6 mm	2.89 mm	31.105 g	.999 silver	Reeded	Eagle; text "ANDORRA", "1 DINER", "2008", "1 UNÇA PLATA PURA .999"	Details of the Coat of arms of Andorra	2008
	1 diner	28 mm	2.90 mm	12.2 g	Brass	Reeded	Coat of arms of Andorra; text "PRINCIPAT D'ANDORRA", "1 D.", "2013"	Our Lady of Meritxell; text "MARE DE DÉU DE MERITXELL"	2013
	2 diners	28.4 mm		11.25 g	Bi-metallic coin (Cupronickel center plug with a brass outer ring)	Reeded	Coat of arms of Andorra; text "PRINCIPAT D'ANDORRA", "2 D.", "2005"	Signing of the Paréages between the Bishop of Urgell and Count of Foix; text "SIGNATURA DELS PAREATGES"	2005
	2 diners	13.92 mm		1 g	.999 gold	Reeded	Eagle; text "ANDORRA", "2 DINERS", "2011", "1 G OR PUR .999"	Details of the Coat of arms of Andorra	2011
	2 diners	13.92 mm		1 g	.9999 gold	Reeded	Eagle; text "ANDORRA", "2 DINERS", "2012", "1 G OR PUR .9999"	Details of the Coat of arms of Andorra	2012
	5 diners	38.5 mm		20 g	.999 silver	Reeded	Coat of arms of Andorra, text "PRINCIPAT D'ANDORRA", "5 D.", "2013"	Golden eagle in flight, text "ÀGUILA DAURADA", "PLATA PURA .999"	2013
	10 diners	16.46 mm		3.11 g	.999 gold	Reeded	Eagle; text "ANDORRA", "10 DINERS", "2009", "1/10 UNÇA OR PUR .999"	Details of the Coat of arms of Andorra	2009

== See also ==
- Andorra and the euro
