= Zall-Reç =

- Administrative unit
- Location within Albania
- Coordinates: 41°52′N 20°19′E
- Country: Albania
- County: Dibër
- Municipality: Dibër

Population (2011)
  - Administrative unit: 681
- Time zone: UTC+1 (CET)
  - Summer (DST): UTC+2 (CEST)

Zall-Reç is a former municipality in the Dibër County, northeastern Albania, made up of seven villages: Kraj-Reç, Zall-Reç, Draj-Reç, Bardhaj-Reç, Hurdhë-Reç, Gjurë-Reç and Ndërshenë. At the 2015 local government reform it became a subdivision of the municipality Dibër. The population at the 2011 census was 681.

== Demographic history ==
The villages of Reçi i Madh and Reçi i Vogël appear in the Ottoman defter of 1467 as properties in the timar of Ismail in the vilayet of Lower Dibra. The former settlement had a total household number of 20, while the latter only 10. From Reçi i Madh: Llazar Rusini, Pal Reçi, Peter Radi, Gjergj Radi, Nikolla Mandrosi, Petër Sogoli, Petër Reçi, Gjon Mandrosi, Gjon Reçi, Andre Boçi, Stjefen Torofta, Tanush Sfojmiri, Tanush Shengjiqi, Andrea Krabili, Lekë Bozi, Pal Reçi the other, Petko Murizi, Mir Reçi, Gjon Kalja, and Andre Sfojmiri.

From Reçi i Vogël: Lekë Reçi, Petër Gjurvishniqi, Lekë Sokoli, Gjergj Pradiskllavi, Llazar Reçi, Gjon Reçi, Laj Gjiraku, Gjon Gamreci, Kolë Reçi, and Popo Pali.
