= Fushë-Çidhën =

- Administrative unit
- Location within Albania
- Coordinates: 41°45′N 20°20′E
- Country: Albania
- County: Dibër
- Municipality: Dibër

Population (2011)
  - Administrative unit: 2,909
- Time zone: UTC+1 (CET)
  - Summer (DST): UTC+2 (CEST)

Fushë-Çidhën is a village and a former municipality in the Dibër County, northeastern Albania. At the 2015 local government reform it became a subdivision of the municipality Dibër. The population at the 2011 census was 2,909.

== Name ==
Çidhën has been linked with the fort Kithinas mentioned by Procopius in the 6th century in Epirus Nova. The etymology of Fushë Çidhën from the Albanian language translates to in English as “Field of Çidhën” referring to being a field of this area.

== Demographic history ==
The settlements of Kidhina e Sipërme and Kidhina e Poshtme are attested in the Ottoman defter of 1467 as villages belonging to the timar of Karagöz in the vilayet of Lower Dibra. The former village had a total of 16 households which were represented by the following household heads: Gjergj Kariqi, Leka Laçi, Gjin Vlashi, Pashtari, Gjon Shumbati, Tolë Gjoneshi, Dimitri Gjoneshi, Kolë Bala, Vlash Shashari, Kolë Shashari, Llazar Arrasi, Gjon Manesi, Gjon Shashari, Peter Pashtari, Gjergj Vlashi, and Petër Dabeci.

The latter settlement on the other hand had only eight households represented by the following: Dimitri Domi, Gjin Peshtiri, Gjin Dushkizi, Mano Madhi, Gjon Shashari, Milo Sokoli, and Dimitri Kusari (possibly, Kosari).

== Sources ==
- Winnifrith, Tom (2021). Nobody's Kingdom: A History of Northern Albania. Signal Books. ISBN 1909930954.
