= Qendër Tomin =

- Administrative unit
- Location within Albania
- Coordinates: 41°42′N 20°25′E
- Country: Albania
- County: Dibër
- Municipality: Dibër

Population (2011)
  - Administrative unit: 7,590
- Time zone: UTC+1 (CET)
  - Summer (DST): UTC+2 (CEST)

Qendër Tomin is a former municipality in the Dibër County, northeastern Albania. At the 2015 local government reform it became a subdivision of the municipality Dibër. The population at the 2011 census was 7,590.
