= Melan =

- Administrative unit
- Location within Albania
- Coordinates: 41°39′N 20°28′E
- Country: Albania
- County: Dibër
- Municipality: Dibër

Population (2011)
  - Administrative unit: 3,649
- Time zone: UTC+1 (CET)
  - Summer (DST): UTC+2 (CEST)

Melan is a village and a former municipality in the Dibër County, northeastern Albania. At the 2015 local government reform it became a subdivision of the municipality Dibër. The population at the 2011 census was 3,649.
