= Zall-Dardhë =

- Administrative unit
- Location within Albania
- Coordinates: 41°48′N 20°20′E
- Country: Albania
- County: Dibër
- Municipality: Dibër

Population (2011)
  - Administrative unit: 1,051
- Time zone: UTC+1 (CET)
  - Summer (DST): UTC+2 (CEST)
- Website: www.zall-dardhe.com

Zall-Dardhë is a village and a former municipality in the Dibër County, northeastern Albania. At the 2015 local government reform it became a subdivision of the municipality Dibër. The population at the 2011 census was 1,051.

== Demographic history ==
The village of Darda appears in the Ottoman defter of 1467 as a part of the timar of Çeribaşı Ali in the vilayet of Lower Dibra. It had a total of 16 households which were represented by: Andre Nekresi, Petër Shimivi, Benele Mamiza (likely in reference to Mamëz in Luma), Tolë Petri, Lekë Majiça, Petër Zogri, Benek Tatari, Tanush Lopeshi, Petër Zogri, Lekë Ripeshi, Nikolla Vokshi, Lekë Mirishklavi, Tolë Domgjoni, Gjon Majça, Gjergj Kipuçi (possibly, Këpuci or Këpuca), and Kolë Bojko.
