= Luzni =

- Administrative unit
- Location within Albania
- Coordinates: 41°39′N 20°23′E
- Country: Albania
- County: Dibër
- Municipality: Dibër

Population (2011)
  - Administrative unit: 2,433
- Time zone: UTC+1 (CET)
  - Summer (DST): UTC+2 (CEST)

Luzni is a former municipality in the Dibër County, northeastern Albania. At the 2015 local government reform it became a subdivision of the municipality Dibër. The population at the 2011 census was 2,433.

== Demographic history ==
Luzni (Luzina) appears in the Ottoman defter of 1467 as a settlement in the timar of the local Albanians Mihail, Progon, and Oliver in the vilayet of Lower Dibra. The village was large and had a total of 46 households, represented by the following household heads: Gjin Potraqi, Gjergji brother of Gjini, Domenik Luzi, Dimitri Luri, Kolë Pratkori, Kolë Luzi, Kolë Gramatiku, Mihal Kamja, Kolë Gëraçi, Andre Luzi, Dimitri Luzi, Llazar Prodani, Petkë Kakrruku, Pop Bezhani, Dabi Kondi, Gjergj Palasha, Kolë Pallamaji, Gjon Ustadi, Pandi Damiza, Kolë Çodila, Dimitri Çodila, Lekë Damiza, Todor Shunbati, Oliver Koçi (possibly, Kuçi), Gjin Mavro, Mihal Koçi, Gjin Prasha, Lal Koçi, Gjuro Luzi, Andrije Irahamishi, Petër Vavila, Pal Ruçi, Kolë Mamiza, Gjon Kudhoni, Marko Kadha, Gjon Koraqi, Pop Gjoni, Radi brother of Pop Gjoni, Miriaka Karufada, Gjergj Zhatkori, Gjon Graçi (possibly, Vraçi), Dimitri Xhudhoni, Tanush Kudhoni, Bard Kudhoni, Domenik Filipi, and Gjon Gjonema.
