= Heinrich Kretschmayr =

Austrian archivist and historian (1870–1939)

- Born: 15 July 1870; Bruck an der Leitha
- Died: 21 July 1939 (aged 69); Vienna
- Occupations: historian and archivist
- Known for: his work on the history of Venice

Heinrich Kretschmayr (1870 – 1939) was an Austrian archivist and historian who specialized in the history of Venice.

His principal work is The History of Venice (German: Geschichte von Venedig) in three volumes - a monumental survey representing the nineteenth-century historiographical tradition. Based on extensive archival research, it deals with events, major figures, economy, administration, religion and culture. Of particular value are the exhaustive appendices on primary sources and literature. The first volume, covering the period down to the death of Enrico Dandolo in 1205, was published in 1905. The second volume, which brings the account of events to the conclusion of the War of the League of Cambrai in 1516, was held back by the outbreak of the First World War and eventually appeared in 1920. The author expected to see the third volume in print in the summer of 1928, but its first draft was lost in the fire of the Palace of Justice on 15 July 1927 during the July Revolt in Vienna; it came out in 1934. The Italian translation suffered even more delay - Kretschmayr and his original Italian translator both died in 1939, shortly before Nazi Germany launched World War II, and although the translation was completed in the post-war years it was never published; a new Italian version appeared in 2006.

== Bibliography ==
- Kretschmayr, Heinrich (1896). "Ludovico Gritti. Eine Monographie". Archiv für österreichische Geschichte. 83 (1): 1–106.
- Kretschmayr, Heinrich (1905–34). Geschichte von Venedig. Vol. 1–3. Gotha: Perthes.
  - vol. I: Bis zum Tode Enrico Dandolos, Gotha 1905
  - vol. II: Die Blüte, Gotha 1920
  - vol. III: Der Niedergang, Stuttgart 1934
- Kretschmayr, Heinrich (1938). Geschichte von Österreich (3 ed.). Österreichischer Landesverlag.
