= Sllovë =

- Administrative unit
- Location within Albania
- Coordinates: 41°49′N 20°25′E
- Country: Albania
- County: Dibër
- Municipality: Dibër

Population (2011)
  - Administrative unit: 2,405
- Time zone: UTC+1 (CET)
  - Summer (DST): UTC+2 (CEST)

Sllovë is a village and a former municipality in the Dibër County, northeastern Albania. At the 2015 local government reform it became a subdivision of the municipality Dibër. The population at the 2011 census was 2,405. Elez Isufi (1861 – 29 December 1924) was an Albanian nationalist figure and guerrilla fighter. He was born in the village of Sllovë in 1861 his father was Isuf Ndreu a native of a region. The population of Sllovë is ethnically Albanian and they speak with the Gheg dialect of the Albanian language.
