= Arras, Albania =

Arras
- Administrative unit
- Location within Albania
- Coordinates: 41°44′N 20°20′E
- Country: Albania
- County: Dibër
- Municipality: Dibër

Population (2023)
  - Administrative unit: 1,866
- Time zone: UTC+1 (CET)
  - Summer (DST): UTC+2 (CEST)

Arras is a village and a former municipality in the Dibër County, northeastern Albania. At the 2015 local government reform it became a subdivision of the municipality Dibër. The population in 2023 was 1,866.
