= Kastriot, Albania =

Kastriot
- Administrative unit
- Location within Albania
- Coordinates: 41°43′45.4″N 20°22′36.78″E
- Country: Albania
- County: Dibër
- Municipality: Dibër

Population (2011)
  - Total: 6,200
- Time zone: UTC+1 (CET)
  - Summer (DST): UTC+2 (CEST)

Kastriot (Albanian definite form: Kastrioti), also known as Vakuf (definite: Vakufi), is a village and a former municipality in the Dibër County, northeastern Albania. At the 2015 local government reform it became a subdivision of the Dibër Municipality. The population at the 2011 census was 6,200.
