= Peshkopi =

Peshkopi Peshkopia
- Administrative unit
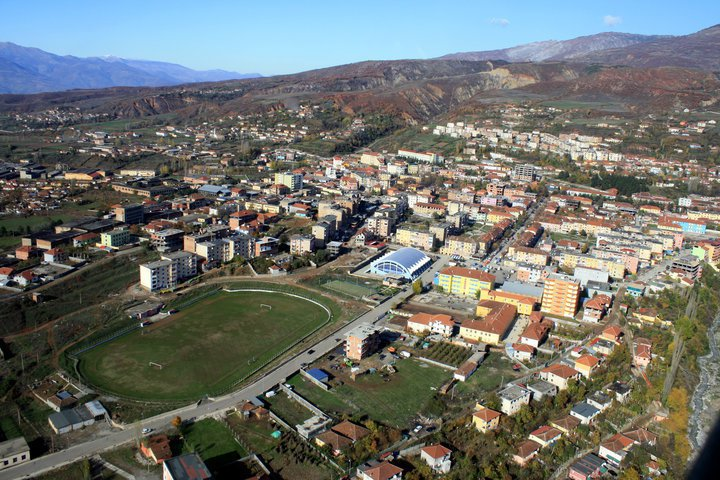
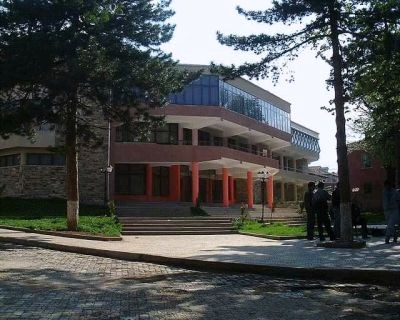
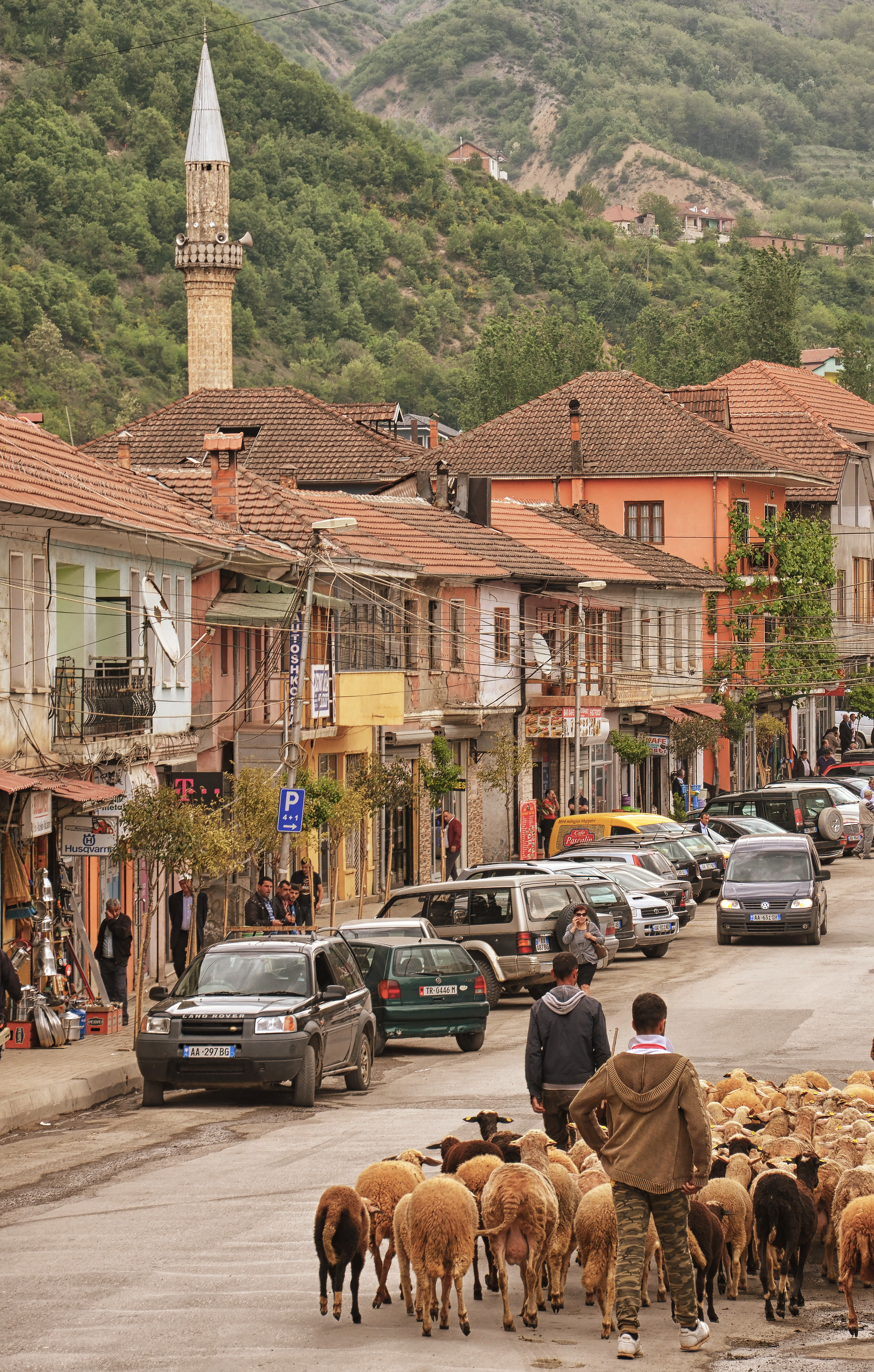
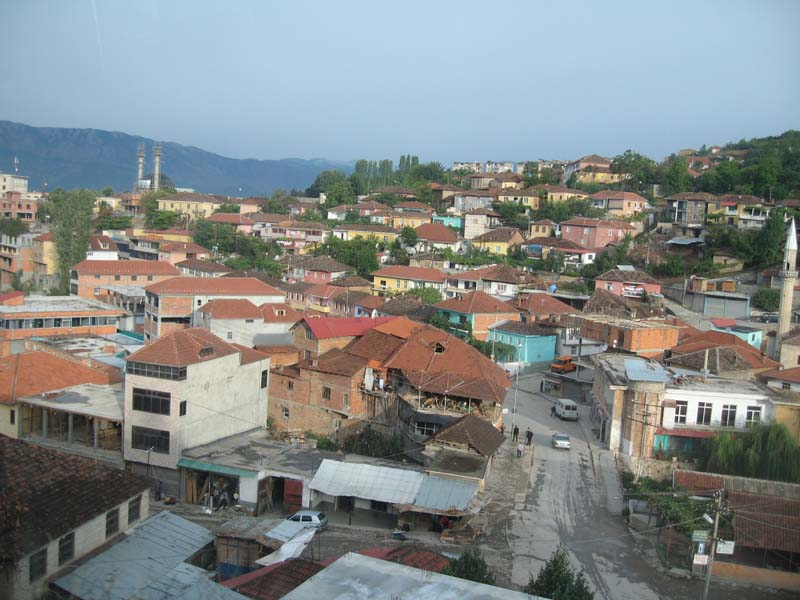
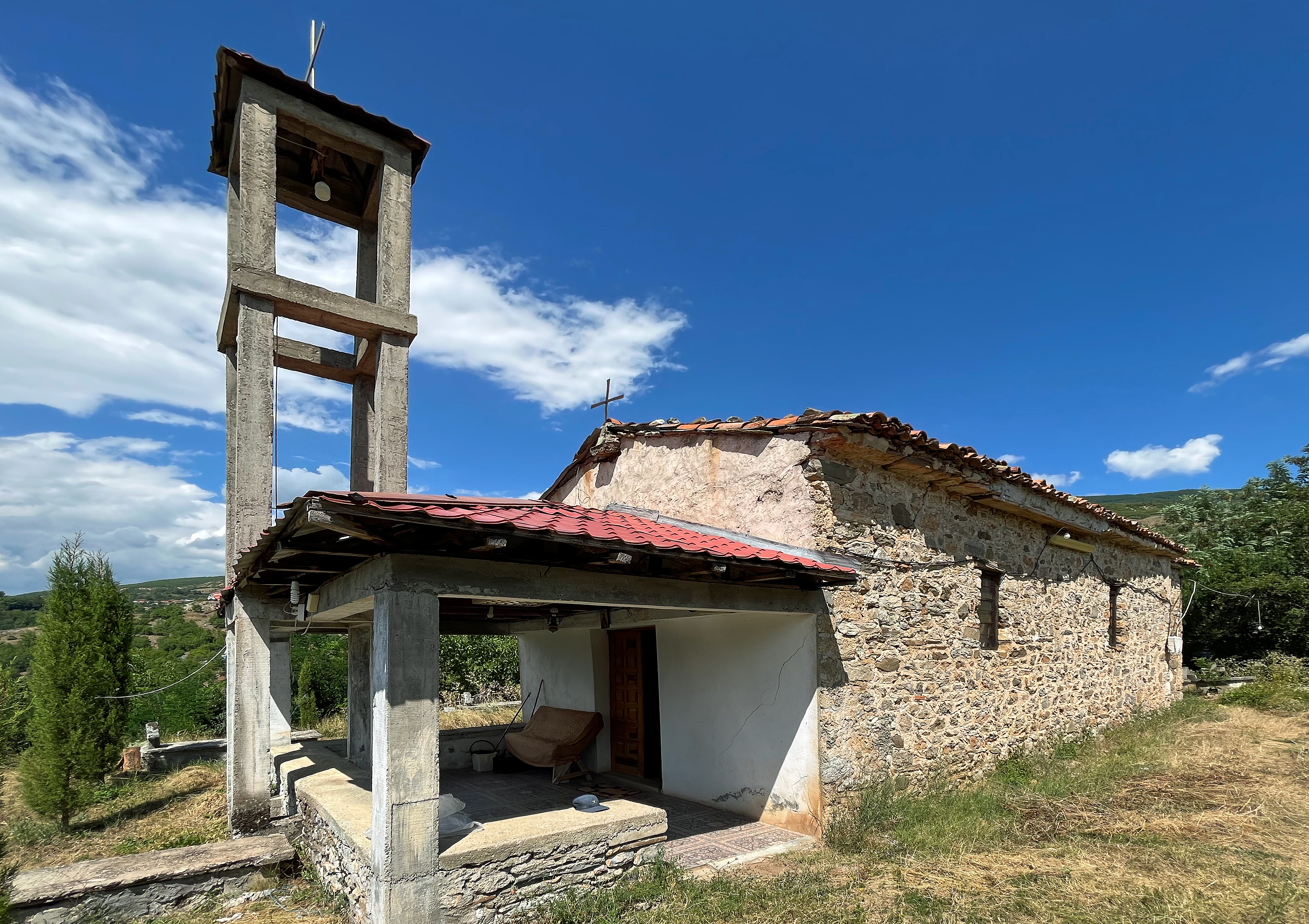
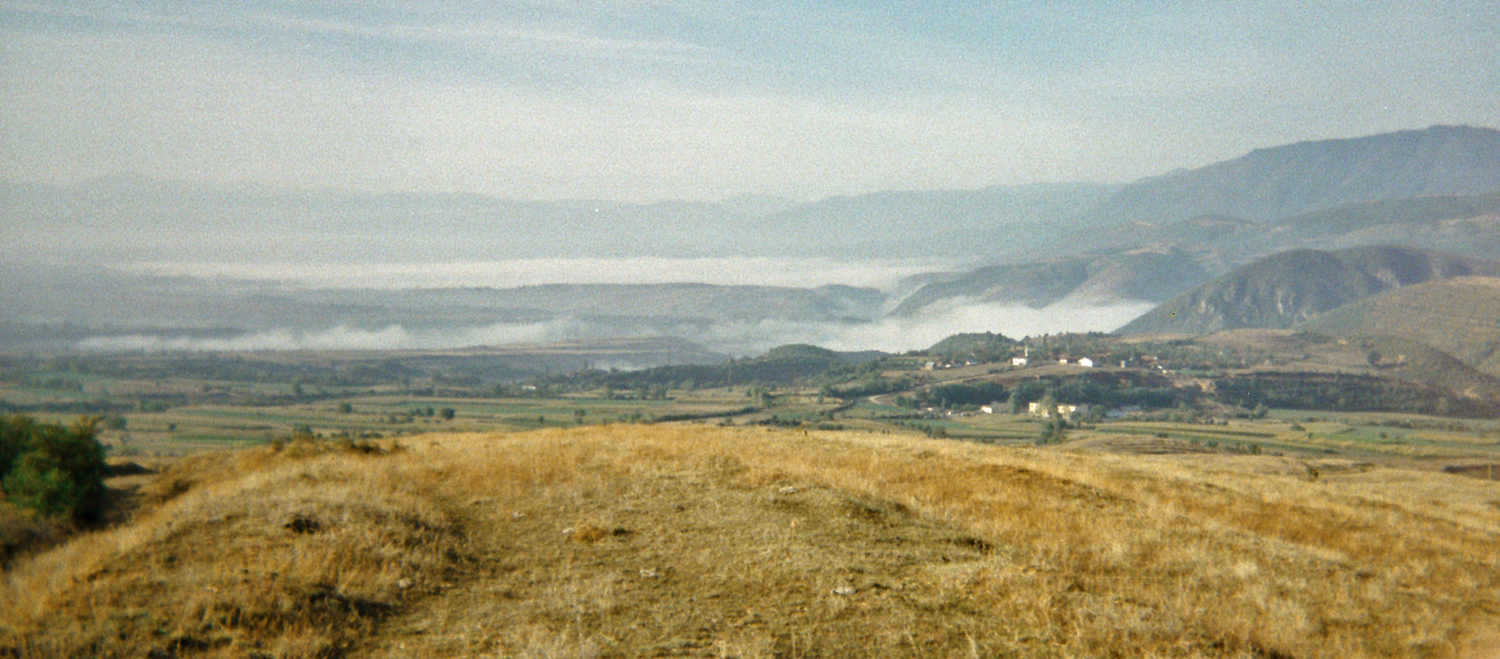
- From the top, Aerial view of Peshkopi, Peshkopi Palace of Culture, Town centre, View of Peshkopi from the road the neighborhood of Dobrovë, Church of the Holy Transfiguration in Herbel, Peshkopi, South view of Peshkopi to the Drin river with fog in the Albanian part

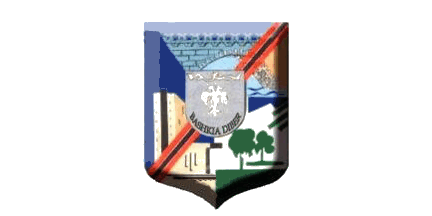
- Flag Emblem

- Location within Albania
- Coordinates: 41°41′00″N 20°25′41″E
- Country: Albania
- County: Dibër
- Municipality: Dibër

Area
  - Municipality: 937.88 km^{2} (362.12 sq mi)
  - Administrative unit: 1.92 km^{2} (0.74 sq mi)
- Elevation: 651 m (2,136 ft)

Population (2023)
  - Administrative unit: 14,710
  - Administrative unit density: 7,660/km^{2} (19,800/sq mi)
- Time zone: UTC+1 (CET)
  - Summer (DST): UTC+2 (CEST)
- Postal Code: 8301
- Area Code: 0218
- Website: www.peshkopia.com

Peshkopi (Albanian pronunciation: [pɛʃkɔpi]; Albanian definite form: Peshkopia) is a town located in the mountainous regions of northeastern Albania, in Dibër County. It is the capital of both the county (Albanian: qark) and the district (Albanian: rreth) of Dibër, and is the only county regional capital in Albania which does not share its name with its county. The population as of the 2023 census is 14,710.

Historical population
Year	Pop.	±%
1950	1,427	—
1960	3,514	+146.3%
1969	5,600	+59.4%
1979	7,800	+39.3%
1989	12,320	+57.9%
2001	14,017	+13.8%
2011	13,251	−5.5%
2023	14,710	+11.0%

Peshkopi lies east of the Black Drin river, about 187 kilometres (116 mi) northeast of Tirana, the capital of Albania, and 20 kilometres (12 mi) from the Macedonian border. The town sits 651 metres (2,136 ft) above sea level.

Known for its thermal waters, year-round agriculture, and natural beauty, Peshkopi is also developing a reputation as tourism destination for outdoor activities such as hiking, camping, mountain biking, and rock climbing. The third tallest mountain in the Balkans, Mount Korabi, and the birthplace of Albania's national hero, Gjerg Kastrioti, are nearby heritages sites. The district also contains large mineral ore deposits such as chromium, sulfur, and marble. It is also an important industrial center in Albania, producing many agricultural products for Albania.

== History ==
The name of Peshkopi is derived from the word peshkop meaning bishop in Albanian and from Episkopè in Greek. The region of Dibër was subsumed under the Archbishopric of Ohrid in 1019, and one year later received the status of an episcopate with its center in the Bulke ward of Peshkopi, located in what is now the neighborhood of Dobrovë. The central church of the Dibër Episcopate was that of St. Stephen (Albanian: Kisha e Shqefnit). The seat of the Episcopate would later be relocated, but the town of Peshkopi retained its name. Peshkopi is referenced as early as the fifteenth century under the name Peskopia.

The region today known as Dibër was inhabited in pre-Christian times by the Illyrian tribe known to the Romans as Penestae, Πενέσται in Ancient Greek (Albanian: penestë).

By the beginning of the sixteenth century, the Ottoman Empire had completed its conquest of Albania. Under the rule of the Ottoman Empire, Peshkopi (then Debre-i Zir, which meant "Lower Debre" in Persian) was a small market town, overshadowed by the larger and more flamboyant Debar (Albanian: Dibra e Madhe, "Greater Dibër"), which today lies just over the Macedonian border. The population of Peshkopi was almost completely Muslim by 1583. In 1873 an Ottoman barracks was built in Peshkopi, housing up to 8,000 soldiers.

The Dibër region, including Peshkopi, took part in the uprisings against Ottoman authority that were occurring throughout Albania in the early 1910s. Albanian armed bands (Albanian: çeta) captured Peshkopi from the Ottomans on August 16, 1912.

In the aftermath of the breakup of the Ottoman Empire, a Serbian army occupied Dibër and entered Peshkopi in early December 1912. Albanian forces retook the city on September 20, 1913. Bulgarian army soldiers invaded Peshkopi on January 1, 1916. The Austro-Hungarian Empire, an ally of Bulgaria, brought an army to Peshkopi on April 12, 1916, and engaged in punitive house-burnings and executions throughout the region in an attempt to quell local resistance. The Bulgarians and Austro-Hungarians departed the area in September 1918.

Italian forces invaded Albania in 1939, reaching Peshkopi on April 15. Albanian Communist partisans retook Peshkopi on September 9, 1943. The following October, the partisans defeated Balli Kombëtar forces in an armed battle for control of the city. In July 1944, German forces occupied the city, but were expelled later that same month. Fighting continued in the Dibër region until early September, leaving the Communist-dominated National Liberation Army (Albanian: Ushtria Nacionalçlirimtare) in control.

== Geography ==
Peshkopi is located in northeastern Albania, in the Dibër County. It is situated in the valley of the Drin river, at the foot of the Korab mountain range. The town is the administrative center of the district and has a population of around 14,000 people. The Korab mountain range, which is one of the highest ranges in the Balkans, is located to the east of the town. The Drin River, which is the longest river in the country, flows through the valley and provides water for irrigation and hydroelectric power generation. The valley is also known for its fertile soil and is an important agricultural area, producing crops such as corn, wheat, and vegetables.

=== Climate ===
Climate data for Peshkopi
Month	Jan	Feb	Mar	Apr	May	Jun	Jul	Aug	Sep	Oct	Nov	Dec	Year
Record high °C (°F)	19.4 (66.9)	22.0 (71.6)	27.0 (80.6)	30.0 (86.0)	34.0 (93.2)	37.8 (100.0)	40.4 (104.7)	41.4 (106.5)	36.0 (96.8)	32.4 (90.3)	26.0 (78.8)	21.2 (70.2)	41.4 (106.5)
Mean daily maximum °C (°F)	6.1 (43.0)	10.0 (50.0)	13.3 (55.9)	18.1 (64.6)	21.9 (71.4)	27.0 (80.6)	31.2 (88.2)	31.0 (87.8)	26.0 (78.8)	20.8 (69.4)	13.1 (55.6)	7.4 (45.3)	18.8 (65.9)
Daily mean °C (°F)	1.9 (35.4)	4.9 (40.8)	7.8 (46.0)	12.1 (53.8)	16.0 (60.8)	20.6 (69.1)	23.5 (74.3)	23.7 (74.7)	19.1 (66.4)	15.3 (59.5)	8.4 (47.1)	3.2 (37.8)	13.0 (55.5)
Mean daily minimum °C (°F)	−2.4 (27.7)	−0.2 (31.6)	2.4 (36.3)	6.0 (42.8)	10.7 (51.3)	14.2 (57.6)	15.8 (60.4)	16.3 (61.3)	12.2 (54.0)	9.8 (49.6)	3.7 (38.7)	−1.0 (30.2)	7.3 (45.1)
Record low °C (°F)	−18.0 (−0.4)	−16.0 (3.2)	−10.0 (14.0)	−6.0 (21.2)	0.0 (32.0)	5.2 (41.4)	7.8 (46.0)	8.8 (47.8)	0.0 (32.0)	−3.0 (26.6)	−8.6 (16.5)	−17.0 (1.4)	−18.0 (−0.4)
Average precipitation mm (inches)	69.9 (2.75)	40.9 (1.61)	54.1 (2.13)	43.9 (1.73)	52.9 (2.08)	21.1 (0.83)	16.3 (0.64)	11.5 (0.45)	43.4 (1.71)	49.0 (1.93)	80.8 (3.18)	67.2 (2.65)	551 (21.69)
Average precipitation days (≥ 0.1 mm)	12.1	9.6	11.1	10.3	11.3	6.9	4.6	4.4	8.7	7.2	11.1	10.3	107.6
Average snowy days	5.1	4.2	2.8	1.2	0.1	0	0	0	0	0.1	1.1	2.6	17.2
Source: MeteoManz (May 2011- June 2025)

== Education ==
Peshkopi has a number of primary and secondary schools, which provide education to children in the town and surrounding areas. The schools offer a range of subjects including math, science, language, and social studies. Many of them also have extracurricular activities such as sports, music, and art programs. Overall, education is highly valued in Peshkopi and the government is continuously investing in the development of the educational system in the town.

=== Tertiary ===
Peshkopi briefly had a branch of Aleksandër Moisiu University. It was closed in 2017 by order of the national Ministry of Education for alleged failure to meet standards.

=== Secondary (grades 10-12) ===
- Said Najdeni High School
- Nazmi Rushiti Professional School

=== Elementary/middle (grades 1-9) ===
- Selim Alliu
- Demir Gashi

== Tourism ==
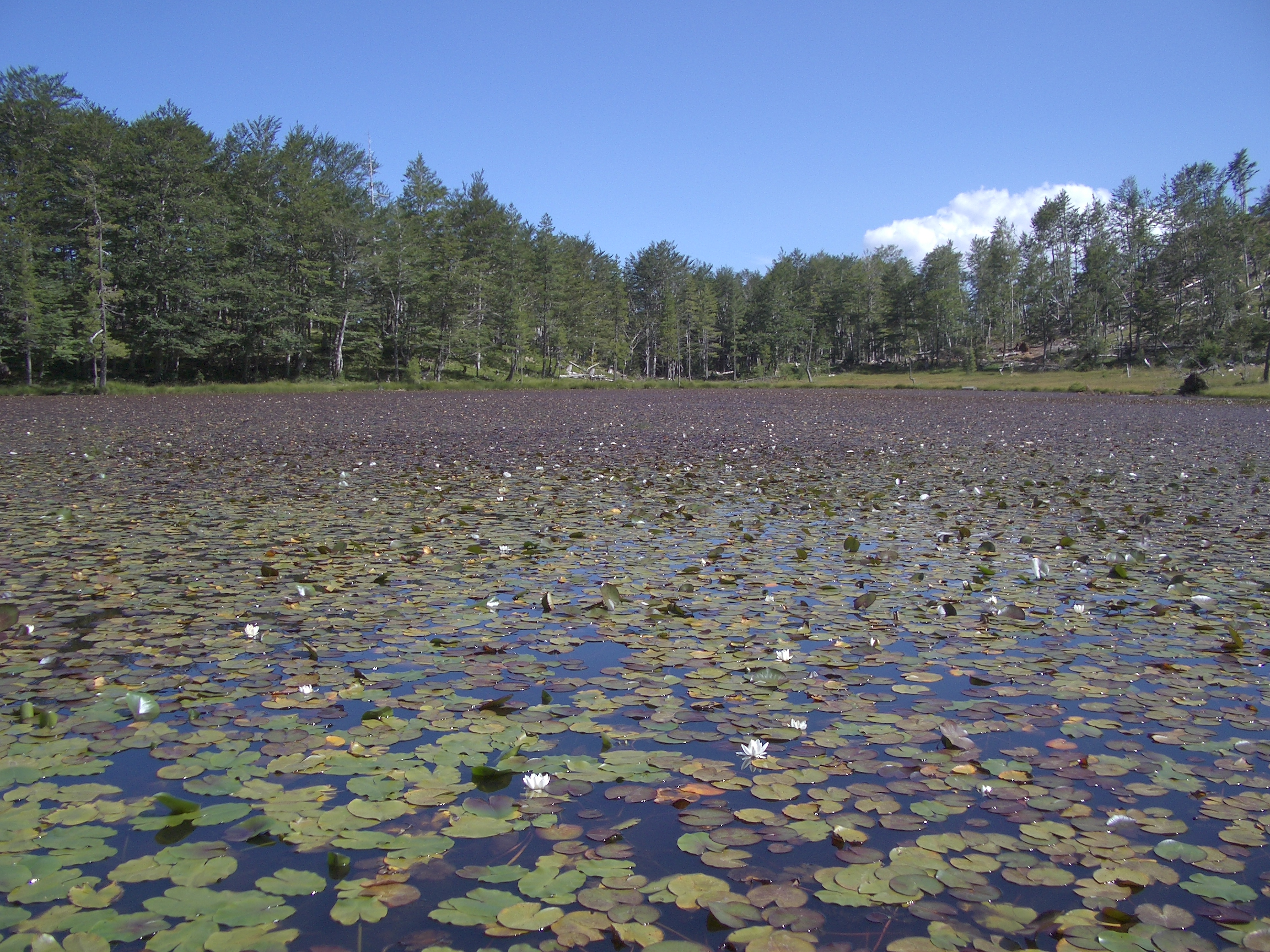
Lure-Dejes Mt National Park

The main form of tourism in the region is mountain tourism, due to the hilly terrain and extensive forest. The district of Dibra is home to two of the thirteen national parks in Albania, Lurë National Park, and Korab-Koritnik Nature Park, which offer a variety of outdoor activities including climbing, walking, skiing, trekking, picnics, hunting, kayaking, etc.

The museum, located beside the general secondary school, houses a collection of local costumes, carpets, kitchen equipment and filigree jewelry, as well as a number of models of local architecture.

Elez Isufi Boulevard is a pedestrian-only street in the middle of Peshkopi lined with linden (Albanian: bli) trees. The street is paved with stone from non-native stone from Berat.

Thermal mineral water springs and sulphur baths (Albanian: llixha, from Turkish ılıca) in the vicinity of Peshkopi are a draw for seasonal tourism, primarily from within Albania, but also to a lesser extent from neighboring countries. They are reputed to alleviate some health issues. The baths are located a short distance east of the city, upstream along the creek which runs through the middle of Peshkopi.

== Sports ==
The main sport played in Peshkopi is football. The city's main team is KF Korabi Peshkopi and its home stadium is Korabi Stadium with a capacity of 6,000 spectators. The multidisciplinary club's home arena is the Bashkim Lala Sports Palace, which has a capacity of over 2,000 spectators. KF Korabi currently plays in the Albanian First Division. They were runners-up in the 1961, 2015–16 Albanian First Division going in to the Albanian Superliga.

== Transportation ==
State Road 6

Peshkopi is an important transportation hub, located at the crossroads of several important roads connecting Albania with Kosovo and North Macedonia. The town is served by the Rinas Mother Teresa International Airport in the capital city of Tirana, which is located around 200 km to the west of Peshkopi. There are also regular bus services connecting the town with Tirana and Durres.

=== Bus ===
Peshkopi is served by bus lines to and from Tirana and Durrës. Buses typically depart in the morning on a fixed schedule. There are also minibuses and vans (Albanian: furgona) serving a wider set of destinations, which depart when sufficiently full. Minibuses to Tirana and Durrës are generally somewhat more expensive than the equivalent bus route.

=== Highways ===
The main road to Peshkopi is SH6 (State Road 6). A new highway called the Arbër Highway (Albanian: Rruga e Arbërit) is currently under construction and is expected to be completed in Spring 2023. The 200 km road will link Tirana with Debar, North Macedonia and will connect with SH6.

=== Train ===
There is no train service to Peshkopi.

== Notable people ==
- Gëzim Alpion - Academic
- Cen Elezi - Bayraktar of Dibra
- Bashkim Gazidede- Politician
- Elez Isufi - Nationalist figure
- Denisa Kola - Miss Albania 2003
- Gentjan Manuka - Footballer
- Elvis Prençi - Footballer
- Symir Zuna - WWII fighter
- Qazim Laçi - Footballer
- Hasan Çipuri - Academic
- Qazim Hoxha - Military Official
