= Dibër (municipality) =

Municipality in Albania

Dibër Dibra
- Municipality
- Dibër
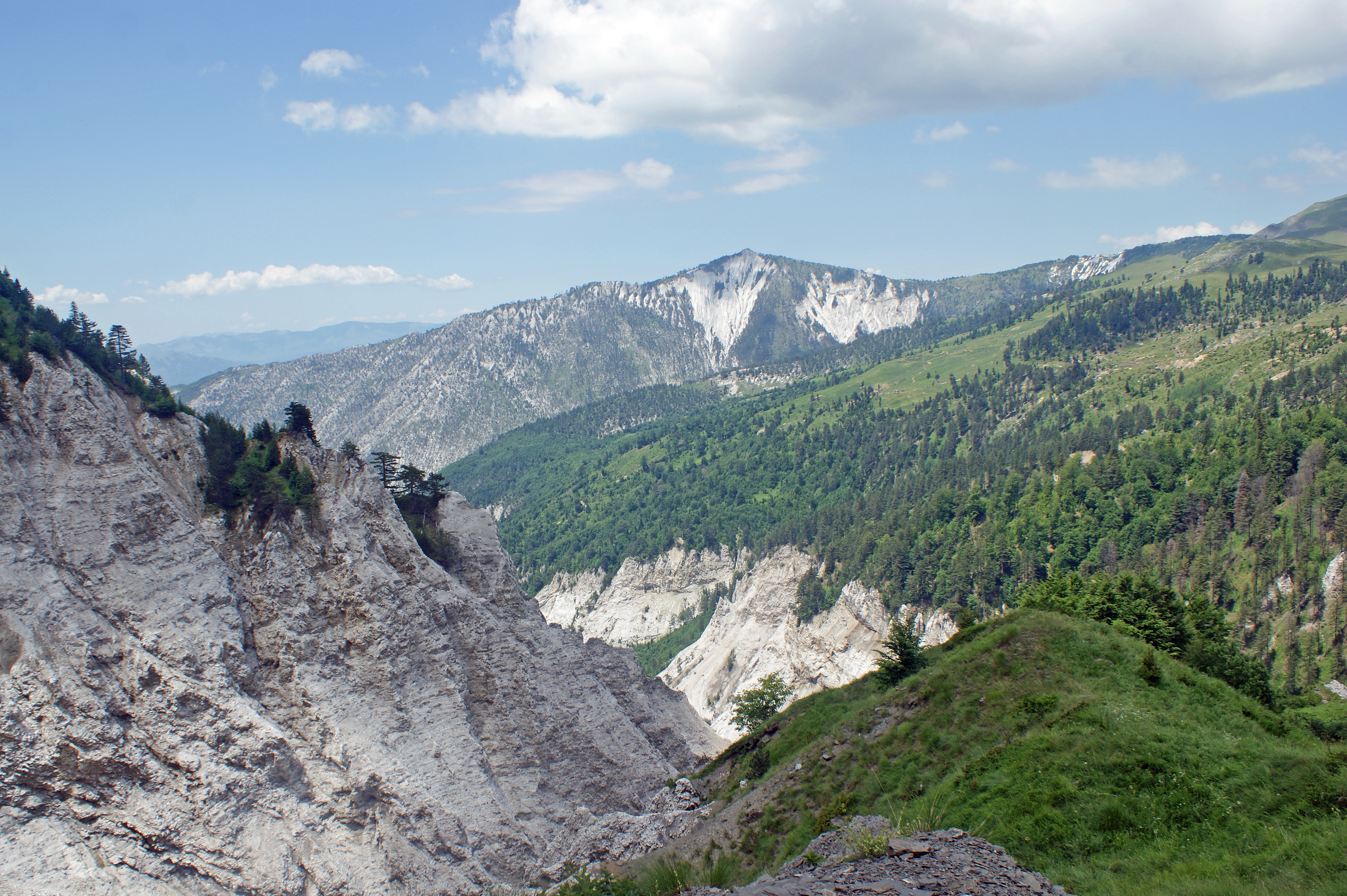
- Korab-Koritnik Nature Park

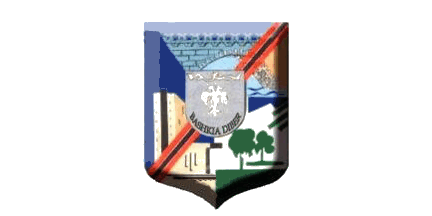
- Flag Emblem

- Location within Albania
- Coordinates: 41°41′28″N 20°27′46″E
- Country: Albania
- County: Dibër
- Seat: Peshkopi

Government
  - Mayor: Rahim Spahiu (PS)

Area
  - Municipality: 937.88 km^{2} (362.12 sq mi)
- Elevation: 865 m (2,838 ft)

Population (2011)
  - Municipality: 61,619
  - Municipality density: 65.700/km^{2} (170.16/sq mi)
- Demonym(s): Albanian: Dibran (m), Dibrane (f)
- Time zone: UTC+1 (CET)
  - Summer (DST): UTC+2 (CEST)
- Postal Code: 8301
- Area Code: (0)218
- Website: dibra.gov.al

Dibër (Albanian: [ˈdiˈbər]; Albanian definite form: Dibra) is a municipality in Dibër County, northeastern Albania. The municipality consists of the administrative units of Arras, Fushë-Çidhën, Kala e Dodës, Kastriot, Lurë, Luzni, Maqellarë, Melan, Muhurr, Selishtë, Sllovë, Tomin, Zall-Dardhë, Zall-Reç with Peshkopi constituting its seat. As of the Institute of Statistics estimate from the 2011 census, there were 61,619 inhabitants in Dibër Municipality. (Note: The population of the municipality results from the sum of the listed administrative units in the former as of the 2011 Albanian census) The area of the municipality is 937.88 km^{2} (362.12 sq mi).

== Geography ==
Dibër Municipality is located on the bank of Black Drin in northeastern Albania adjacent to the border with North Macedonia. The Korab Mountain is the highest mountain in Albania and forms alongside the Deshat Mountain the eastern of border of Dibër Municipality. Lurë-Dejë National Park sprawls in the remote mountainous west of the area with Korab-Koritnik Nature Park extending in the east.

== Demography ==
Despite the municipality's proximity to North Macedonia, Dibër's ethnic make-up is relatively homogeneous, but there is a small Macedonian minority living in the villages around Maqellarë. Unlike the Macedonians who live around Lake Prespa, they have no linguistic rights and no autonomous subdivisions. Almost 90 percent of Dibër's population are Muslim, while the Macedonian minority is Orthodox. The Khalwati order has a khanqah in the village of Herbel, while Allajbegi's Mosque in Maqellarë is a recognised cultural monument. Like all the rural municipalities of Albania, Dibër is heavily affected by emigration.

== See also ==
- List of mayors of Dibër
