= List of bridges in Albania =

There are hundreds of bridges and bridge ruins found throughout Albania. A total of 90 have achieved the status of monument of cultural heritage. The oldest standing bridge in the country is the Kauri Bridge, located in the village of Poshnjë, it dates back to the late antiquity.

The longest spanning bridge is the Shushica Bridge (520 m), it crosses the Devoll river as a segment of the Banjë-Gramsh road. The two highest bridges in the country are the Fshat Bridge and the Vasha Bridge, respectively 157 m (515 ft) and 152 m (499 ft) high. They are part of the important Arbër Road project which aims to connect the central region of the country with the western border of North Macedonia in a much shorter period than the old route.

== Historical and architectural interest bridges ==
Only 72 bridges built during the Ottoman period have survived.

	Name	Albanian	Distinction	Length	Type	Carries Crosses	Opened	Location	County	Ref.
1	Kasabashit Bridge	Ura e Kasabashit	Cultural Monument	26 m (85 ft)	Masonry; 1 pointed arch	Footbridge; Vlosh	1640	Çorovodë; 40°30′56.3″N 20°14′34.6″E	Berat County	
2	Vizier Bridge submerged	Ura e Vezirit			Masonry	Footbridge; Drin (river)	17th century	Kukës	Kukës County	
3	Kamara Bridge	Ura e Kamares	Cultural Monument	40 m (130 ft)	Masonry; 2 segmental arches	Footbridge; Shkumbin	1715	Mirakë; 41°10′14.0″N 20°15′43.7″E	Elbasan County	
4	Mesi Bridge	Ura e Mesit	Span : 21.5 m (71 ft); Cultural Monument	130 m (430 ft)	Masonry; 13 semi-circular arches	Footbridge; Kir (river)	1768	Mes; 42°06′52.1″N 19°34′30.2″E	Shkodër County	
5	Bahçallëk Bridge destroyed in 1880	Ura e Bahçallëkut			Masonry; 5 semi-circular arches	Drin (river)	1768	Shkodër; 42°02′32.6″N 19°29′34.5″E	Shkodër County	
6	Gorica Bridge	Ura e Goricës	Historic Centre of Berat; World Heritage Site; Cultural Monument	129 m (423 ft)	Masonry; 7 semi-circular arches	Former road bridge Osum	1780	Berat; 40°42′11.5″N 19°56′40.7″E	Berat County	
7	Kadiu Bridge	Ura e Katiut	Cultural Monument	30 m (98 ft)	Masonry; 1 pointed arch	Footbridge; Lengaricë	18th century	Bënjë-Novoselë; 40°14′39.8″N 20°25′57.0″E	Gjirokastër County	
8	Tanners' Bridge	Ura e Tabakëve	Cultural Monument		Masonry; 2 semi-circular arches	Footbridge; Former Lanë	18th century	Tirana; 41°19′35.1″N 19°49′33.8″E	Tirana County	
9	Vasha Bridge (18th century)	Ura e Vashës		11 m (36 ft)	Masonry; 1 semi-circular arch	Footbridge; Mat (river)	18th century	Klos; 41°28′03.1″N 20°06′16.4″E	Dibër County	
10	Kordhocë bridge	Ura e Kordhocës			Masonry; 5 arches (4 semi-circular and 1 segmental)	Footbridge; Drino	1820	Kordhocë; 40°03′39.8″N 20°10′24.2″E	Gjirokastër County	
11	Beçishtit Bridge	Ura e Beçishtit		260 m (850 ft)	Suspension; Steel, masonry piers	Footbridge; Vjosa	20th century	Tepelenë; 40°17′51.8″N 20°01′26.3″E	Gjirokastër County	
12	Bushtrica Bridge	Ura e Bushtricës	Highest railway bridge in Albania; Height : 48 m (157 ft)	255 m (837 ft)	Beam bridge Prestressed concrete	Rrogozhinë–Pogradec railway Shkumbini	1973	Prrenjas; 41°05′55.4″N 20°26′35.7″E	Elbasan County	

== Major road and railway bridges ==
	Name	Albanian	Span	Length	Type	Carries Crosses	Opened	Location	County	Ref.
1	Drini Bridge	Ura e Drinit	270 m (890 ft)	310 m (1,020 ft)	Arch; Steel tied arch Bow-string bridge	National road SH75; Future A1 Durrës-Kukës Highway; European route E851; Black Drin	2024	Kukës; 42°04′27.9″N 20°24′26.5″E	Kukës County	
2	Vasha Bridge under construction	Ura e Vashës		316 m (1,037 ft)	Arch; Steel deck arch	Arbër Highway; Mat (river)	2023	Klos; 41°28′25.8″N 20°06′11.3″E	Dibër County	
3	Fshat Bridge under construction	Ura e Fshatit			Arch; Steel deck arch	Arbër Highway	2023	Klos; 41°28′40.3″N 20°04′36.3″E	Dibër County	
4	Buna River Bridge project	Ura Velipojë - Ulqin	139 m (456 ft)	310 m (1,020 ft)	Beam bridge Composite steel/concrete 85+139+85	Road bridge Buna		Velipojë–Ulcinj; 41°52′43.6″N 19°22′38.0″E	Shkodër County; Montenegro	
5	Dragot Bridge	Ura e Dragotit	108 m (354 ft)	108 m (354 ft)	Truss; Steel	National road SH75; Vjosa	1935	Tepelenë; 40°17′32.8″N 20°04′44.8″E	Gjirokastër County	

== Alphabetical list ==
Name	Region	Built	Length	Width	Height	Crosses	Notes
Beçisht Bridge	Tepelenë	1819	200 m (660 ft)		6 m (20 ft)	Vjosë	Ottoman era, connects 7 villages along the Vjosë river
Brataj Bridge	Vlorë	16th century	50 m (160 ft)	4 m (13 ft)	12 m (39 ft)	Shushicë	Ottoman era
Bridges over Gjanica	Fier	1777, 1935, etc.					The 7 pedestrian bridges that span the Gjanica river are located within the Fier city limits
Old Buna Bridge	Shkodër	1889	166 m (545 ft)			Buna river	
New Buna Bridge	Shkodër	2011	275.5 m (904 ft)	13.5 m (44 ft)	6 m (20 ft)	Buna river	Swingbridge
Bushtrica Bridge	Librazhd	1973			50 m (160 ft)		Railway bridge
Dragoti Bridge	Tepelenë	1935	108 m (354 ft)	5 m (16 ft)		Vjosë	
Drini Bridge	Kukës	2024	270 m (890 ft)	23.213 m (76.16 ft)	10 m (33 ft)		
Erzen Bridge	Shijak	1949	91 m (299 ft)				Railway bridge
Goliku Bridge	Pogradec	17th century	17 m (56 ft)	3 m (9.8 ft)	10 m (33 ft)	Shkumbin	Ottoman era, near the village of Mokër
Gomsiqe Bridge	Pukë						
Gorica Bridge	Berat	1780, 1927	129.3 m (424 ft)	5.3 m (17 ft)	10 m (33 ft)	Osum	Ottoman era
Kaçarello Bridge	Dropull	1780s				Kaçarello	Ottoman era, located in the village of Hllomo
Kadiu Bridge	Përmet	1760	37 m (121 ft)		7 m (23 ft)	Lengaricë	Ottoman era
Kamara Bridge	Librazhd	1715	40 m (130 ft)	3.5 m (11 ft)		Shkumbin	Ottoman era, near the village of Mirakë
Kasabashi Bridge	Çorovodë	1640	26 m (85 ft)	3 m (9.8 ft)		Osum	Ottoman era
Kordhocë Bridge	Gjirokastër	1820	20 m (66 ft)	3.7 m (12 ft)	7 m (23 ft)	Drino	Ottoman era
Kukës Bridge	Kukës					Drini i Zi River	
Mat Bridge	Kurbin	1927				River Mat	Named after King Zogu.
Mesi Bridge	Shkodër	1768	108 m (354 ft)	3.4 m (11 ft)	12.5 m (41 ft)	Kir	Ottoman era
Orgockë Bridge	Kolonjë	17th century	63 m (207 ft)	3.4 m (11 ft)			Ottoman era, has been badly damaged in recent years by heavy rainfall
Pishkash Bridge	Librazhd	1973			32 m (105 ft)		Railway bridge, segment Elbasan-Prrenjas
Prokop Bridge	Himarë	1878	7 m (23 ft)	3.8 m (12 ft)	4 m (13 ft)		Ottoman era, located east of the historic center of Himarë
Qukës Bridge 1, 2	Librazhd	1973			30 m (98 ft), 25 m (82 ft)		Railway bridge, segment Elbasan-Prrenjas
St. John the Baptist Bridge	Moscopole	1771	51.7 m (170 ft)	4.6 m (15 ft)	8 m (26 ft)		Ottoman era, connects the village with the St. John the Baptist Monastery.
Shtrezë Bridge	Kukës						Segment of the Kukës-Shishtavec road
Skavica Bridge	Kukës					Black Drin tributary	Bailey bridge
Tanners' Bridge	Tirana	18th century	8 m (26 ft)	2.5 m (8 ft 2 in)	3.5 m (11 ft)	Lanë	Ottoman era
Tarazhi Bridge	Rrëshen	1989	800 m (2,600 ft)		38 m (125 ft)		Railway bridge
Tatzat Bridge	Delvinë	1537-1570	12 m (39 ft)	2 m (6 ft 7 in)	5 m (16 ft)		Ottoman era, located in the village of Vergo
Old Vasha Bridge	Mat	18th century	11 m (36 ft)	2.8 m (9 ft 2 in)	7 m (23 ft)	Mat	Ottoman era
Vasha Bridge	Klos	2021	250 m (820 ft)		158 m (518 ft)		Part of Arbër Highway
Velabisht Bridge	Berat	1760	70 m (230 ft)	7 m (23 ft)	7 m (23 ft)	Osum	Ottoman era
Vokopolë Bridge	Berat	1750s	43 m (141 ft)			Çorofgjat	Ottoman era, connecting the villages of Vokopolë and Tërpan
Zëmblak Bridge	Maliq		54 m (177 ft)			Devoll	Near the village of Zëmblak.
Zoto Bridge	Vithkuq	19th century	30 m (98 ft)	3 m (9.8 ft)	3.8 m (12 ft)		Ottoman era, located at the entrance of the historic village of Vithkuq
Zvërnec Bridge	Vlorë	2018	280 m (920 ft)	3 m (9.8 ft)			Connects visitors to the Zvërnec Monastery

== Notes and references ==
- Nicolas Janberg. "International Database for Civil and Structural Engineering". Structurae.com.
- Others references

== See also ==
- Transport in Albania
- Highways in Albania
- Motorways in Albania
- Rail transport in Albania
- Geography of Albania
- List of rivers of Albania
