= Tanners' Bridge =

Bridge in Tirana, Albania

Tanner's Bridge Ura e Tabakëve
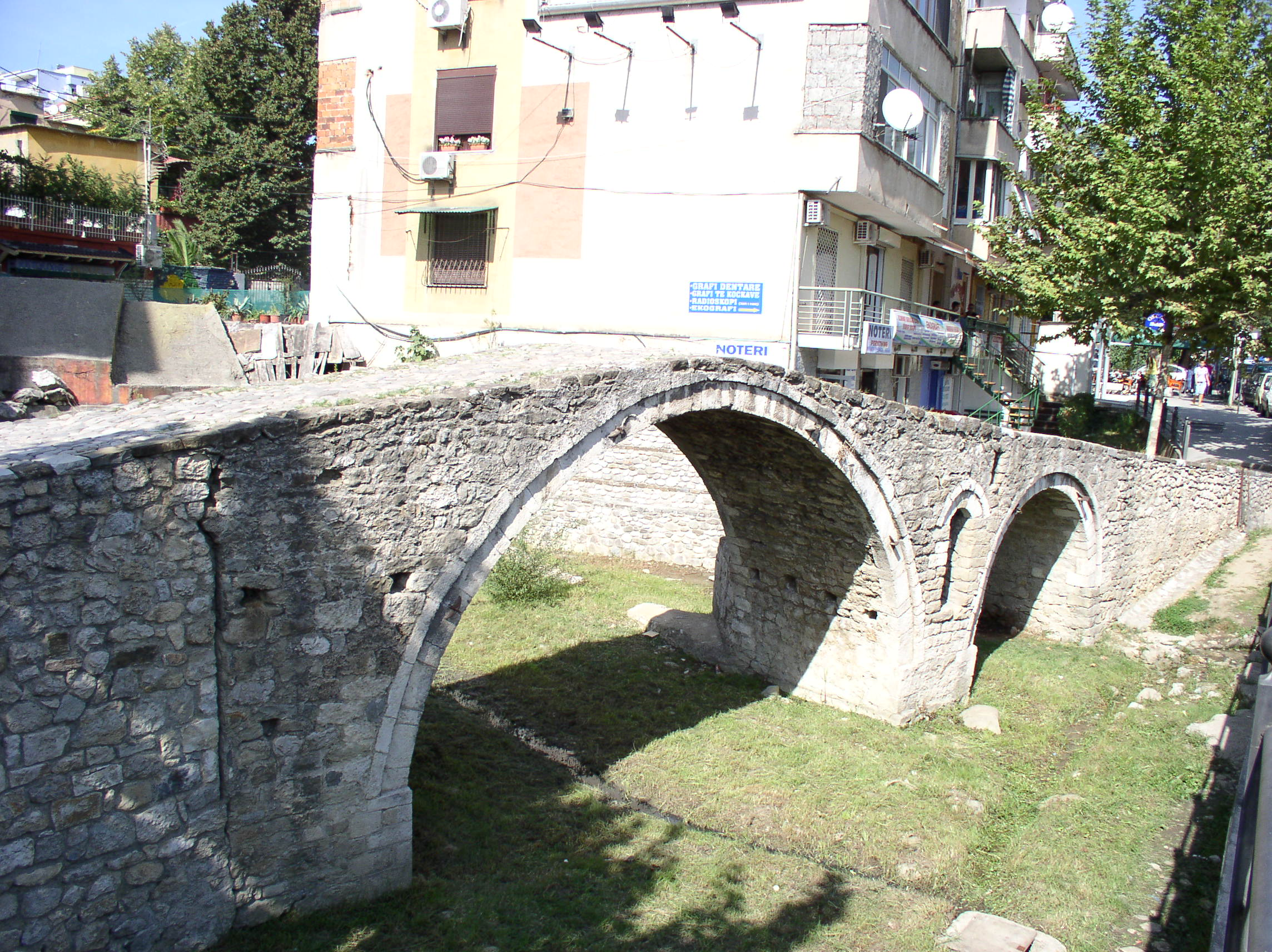
- The Tanners' Bridge in Tirana
- Coordinates: 41°19′48″N 19°49′12″E

Characteristics
- Material: Stones of the Lanë stream
- Total length: 8 m (26 ft)
- Width: 2.5 m (8 ft 2 in)
- Height: 3.5 m (11 ft)
- Longest span: 2,5m
- No. of spans: 3

History
- Construction end: 18th century

Statistics
- Daily traffic: Before used by farming caravans, now as pedestrian bridge

Location
- Interactive map of Tanner's Bridge; Ura e Tabakëve

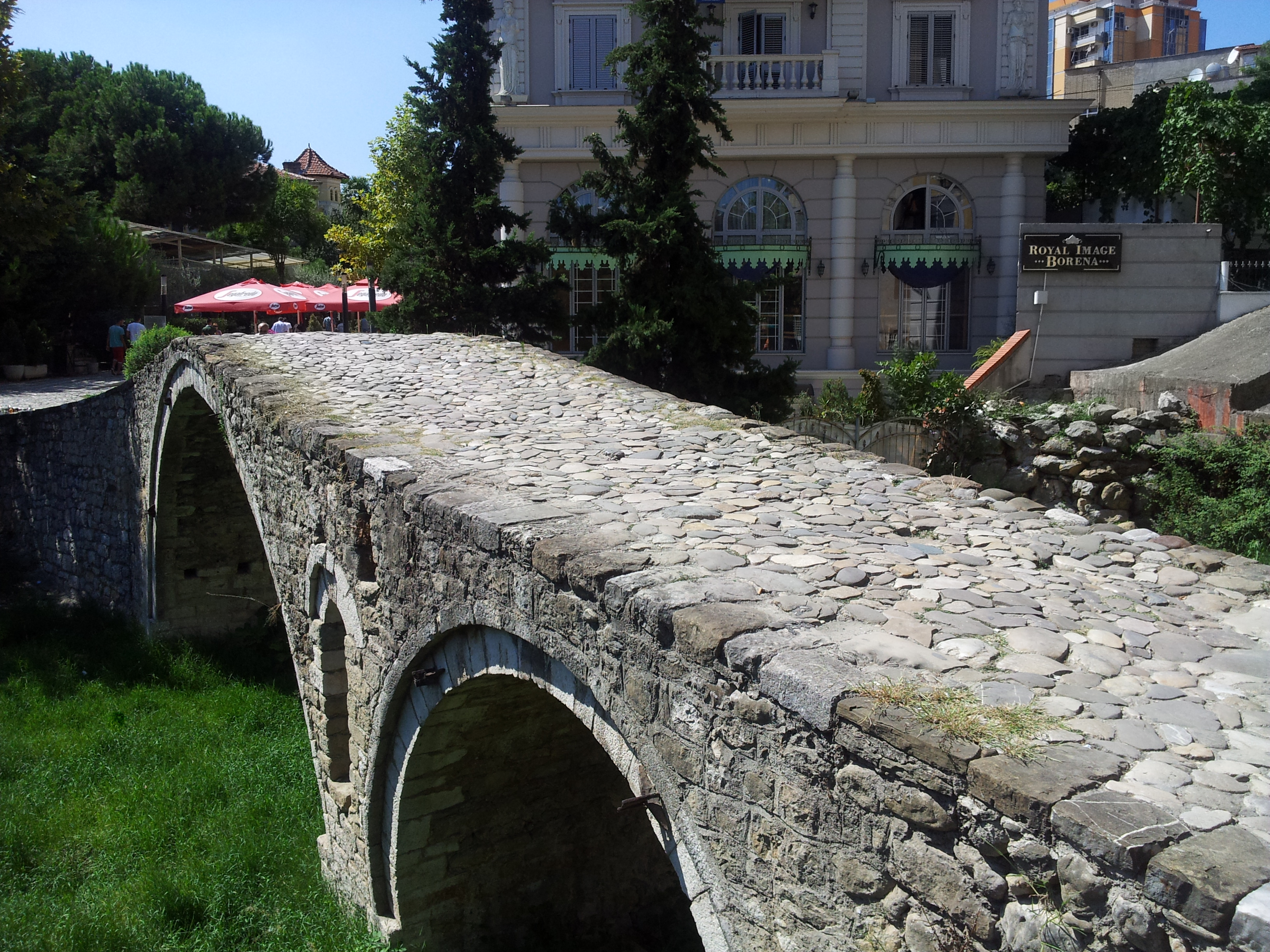
The Tanner's Bridge

The Tanners' Bridge (Albanian: Ura e Tabakëve) is an 18th-century Ottoman period stone footbridge located in Tirana, Albania. The bridge, built near the Tanners' Mosque, was once part of the Saint George Road that linked Tirana with the eastern highlands. The road was the route by which livestock and produce entered the city. The bridge crossed the Lanë stream near the area where butcher shops and leather workers were located. The bridge fell into disrepair when the Lanë was diverted in the 1930s. In the 1990s, the bridge was restored for use by pedestrians.

== History ==
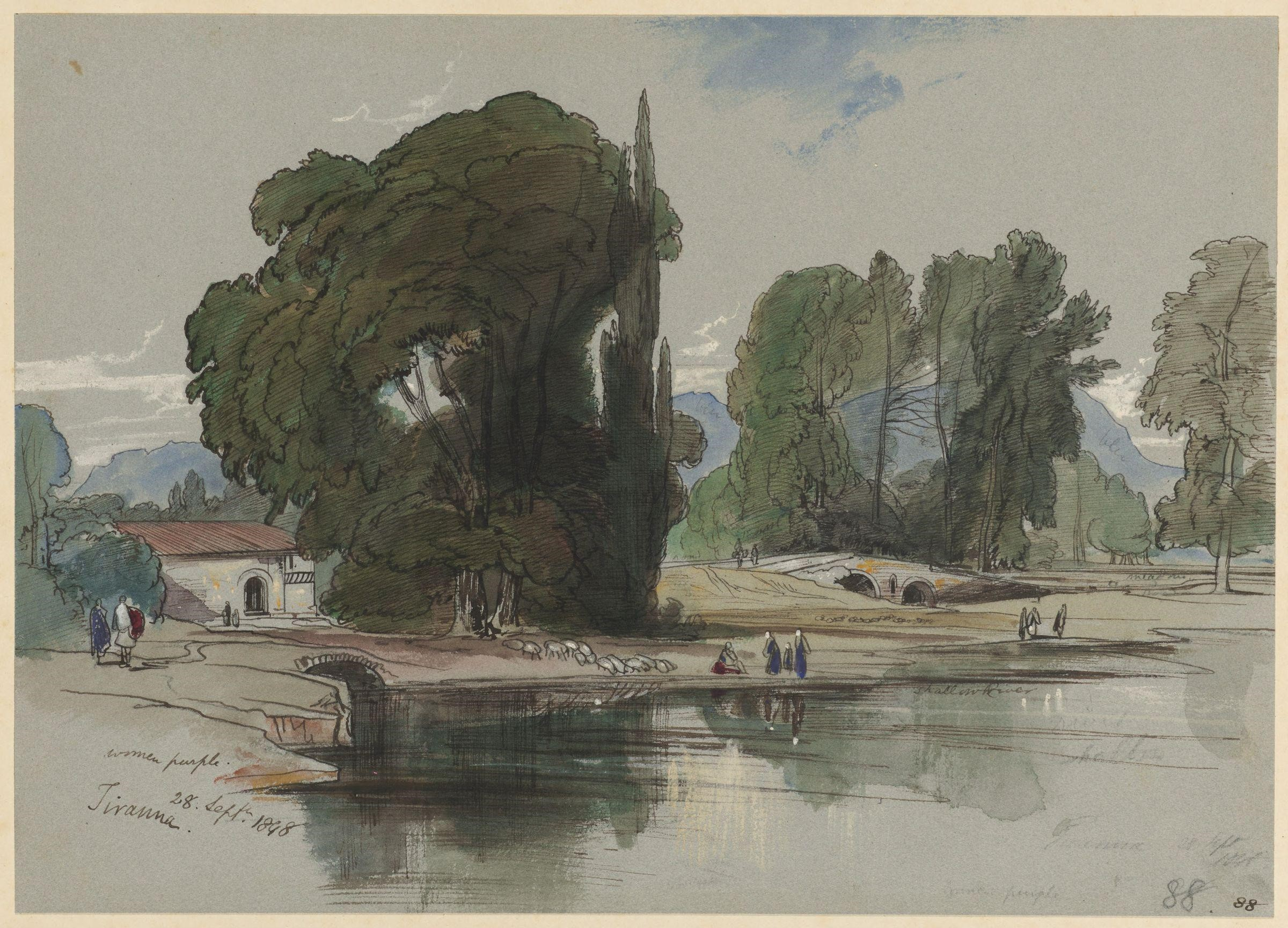
Ura e Tabakëve in 1848, watercolor painting by Edward Lear.

The Tanners' Bridge was part of the road that connected Tirana with Debar through Shëngjergj, also called Shëngjergj Road (Albanian: Rruga e Shëngjergjit). The road to Debar passed through Priskë e Madhe, Qafe Priskë, Domje, Shëngjergj, and further on it continued through Bizë, Martanesh, Zerqan and finally Debar. The road connected Tirana with the eastern highlands, and was mainly used by farmers to bring produce and livestock into the city. There were certain families, such as Xheleti or Kuka, that engaged in tanning of animal hide. In Albanian, they were called tabakë [plural of tabak], which is the old name for that profession. The road within the city, a square and also the bridge itself were called Rruga e Tabakëve (English: the road of tanners, or Tanner Road).

The bridge was in use across the Lanë stream to the other until the 1930s. Later the Lanë was diverted from its previous course.

In the 1990s, the bridge was cleaned and fully restored, and is now used by pedestrians alone. In 2007, one of the engineers that worked on the "Ethnography in movement" project declared to the Albanian News Agency (Albanian: Agjencia Telegrafike Shqiptare) that the underground infrastructural work on the bridge had been completed. During the restoration work the bridge's foundations were uncovered and an artificial pond was recreated on both sides of the bridge. In addition, the original stones of the bridge were also cleaned up. A historical re-evaluation of the area is in the municipality projects, inclusive of the construction of an underground market. The overall project intends that the entire area be used by pedestrians only. The intended area extends from the Tanners' Bridge to the square where the flag of Albania was raised for the first time on 26 November 1912.

The bridge is now seen by the municipality of Tirana as one of the most important cultural heritage monuments of the city. The bridge is considered as a testimony of Tirana's urban development in the 18th century. The Tanner's Bridge is also a testament to the fine bridge construction that was employed in Tirana at the time, and is one of many bridges in Albania dating from the Ottoman period which are of architectural and historical importance.
