= Bualli Pass =

- Albanian: Qafa e Buallit
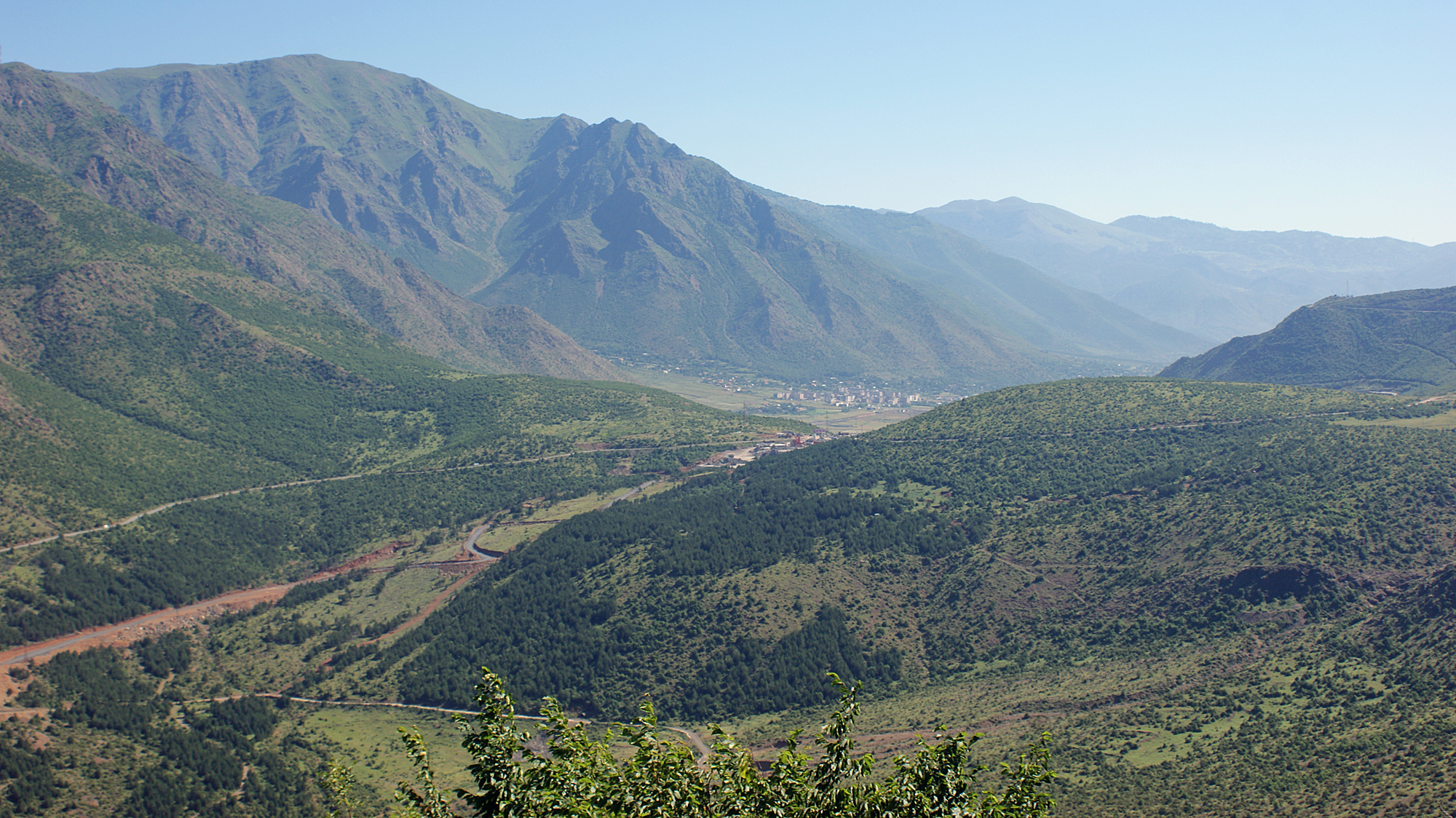
- The pass from the southwest, with Bulqiza in the background.

- Location within Albania
- Interactive map of Bualli Pass
- Elevation: 842 metres (2,762 ft)

Third Approach
- Location: Klos (municipality), Albania
- Coordinates: 41°28′55″N 20°11′45″E

The Bualli Pass (Albanian: Qafa e Buallit, Buffalo Pass) is an 842 metre high mountain pass in Albania. It is part of the National Road 6, which links the Albanian coast to Mat District and the Dibër valley. The west end of the pass is in the watershed of the Mat river and the eastern part is in the watershed of the Drin. Immediately east of the highest point of the pass is the town of Bulqizë.

As of 2011, a new road through the pass was being built, the so-called Rruga e Arbërit. Between Bulqizë and the Drin, National Road 6 was expanded into a wider, two-lane highway, a by-pass was built around Bulqizë itself and then work continued further west. The pass itself was crossed by a short tunnel. The west approach to Klos received a new route. Eventually, the Rruga e Arbërit is intended to provide a direct connection between Tirana and the Macedonian border, instead of the current route which requires a detour through Milot and Burrel. For the direct route through the mountains another tunnel and large bridges are necessary between Tirana and Klos. These plans were modified over time.

From the top of the pass, a road splits off towards Krastë in the Martanesh region to the southwest.

The Qafa e Buallit is located in region with many mines, for which the city of Bulqizë serves as a centre. A large tunnel links these mines to the pass at an altitude of over 700 metres.
