= Ura e Shtrenjtë =

- Village
- Location within Albania
- Coordinates: 42.145°N 19.658°E
- Country: Albania
- County: Shkodër
- Municipality: Shkodër
- Administrative unit: Postribë
- Time zone: UTC+1 (CET)
  - Summer (DST): UTC+2 (CEST)

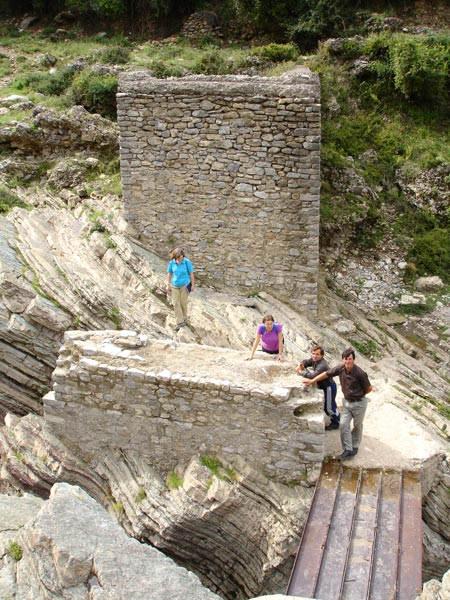
Photo: Christian Guthier, albaniabridge.co.uk

Ura e Shtrenjtë is a small village in the valley of the river Kir in northern Albania. It was part of the former municipality of Postribë, in Shkodër County. At the 2015 local government reform, it became part of the municipality of Shkodër. It is a very small and poor community, making a basic living off the land. The farmers produce a variety of crops, from corn and beans, to raising livestock. Supported by Oxfam, the farmers have also expanded in honey production. The honey is very aromatic, as its source is a mixture of wild chestnut, sage and thyme pollen.

The village is divided in two by a deep gorge, which used to be crossed by a large stone bridge.

The village's old bridge was washed away by the river a few years ago, at a time when water level was unusually high. Unable to afford the reconstruction, a narrow metal plank was instead laid down by the local residents as a makeshift bridge. Aside of safety concerns, the annual rise in the river's water level as a result of the melting mountain snow in Springtime also meant that the metal bridge could be easily submerged, effectively cutting off the village's access to the outside world.
