= Milot =

Milot may refer to:

- Milot, Albania, a municipality in Lezhë County, Albania
- Milot, Haiti, a commune in Nord department, Haiti
- Milot Rashica (born 1996), Kosovo Albanian footballer
