= SH 6 (Albania) =

National highway in Albania

National Road SH6
- Rruga shtetërore SH6

Location
- Country: Albania
- Counties: Lezhë; Dibër
- Major cities: Milot; Burrel; Klos; Bulqizë; Peshkopi

Highway system
- Highways in Albania

The National Road 6 (Albanian: Rruga shtetërore SH6) leads from Milot to Peshkopi.

The SH6 breaks off from National Road 1 at Milot and travels through Burrel, Klos and Bulqizë to Peshkopi.

The first section, between Milot and Klos, follows the Mat river valley, initially in a narrow cutting through the Skanderbeg range. North of Burrel in the hilly terrain of Mat it often travels far from the river. From Klos, the SH6 rises around 550 metres to the Bualli Pass at 842 metres above sea level. East of this, it follows the Bulqizë valley to the Drin river, which it crosses at a narrow point. At Maqellarë, there is a junction with the road to Debar in North Macedonia. There is a new by-pass at Maqellarë. From here the SH6 travels north to Peshkopi, travelling through hilly terrain far from the river once more. The first few kilometres of this road have been renovated recently.

== Arbër Highway ==
Between Bulqizë and the Drin, the SH6 has been expanded into a broader, two-lane road. West of Bulqizë, construction was still in progress, as of 2011, as part of the national highway construction project. The new road would provide a direct link from Tirana to the Macedonian border, without the detour through Milot and Burrel. As part of this, the Qafa e Buallit pass will be replaced by a short tunnel. For the section travelling through the mountains between Tirana and Klos, many tunnels and complicated bridge systems are required.

== See also ==
- Arbër Highway
