= Mesi Bridge =

Mesi Bridge Ura e Mesit
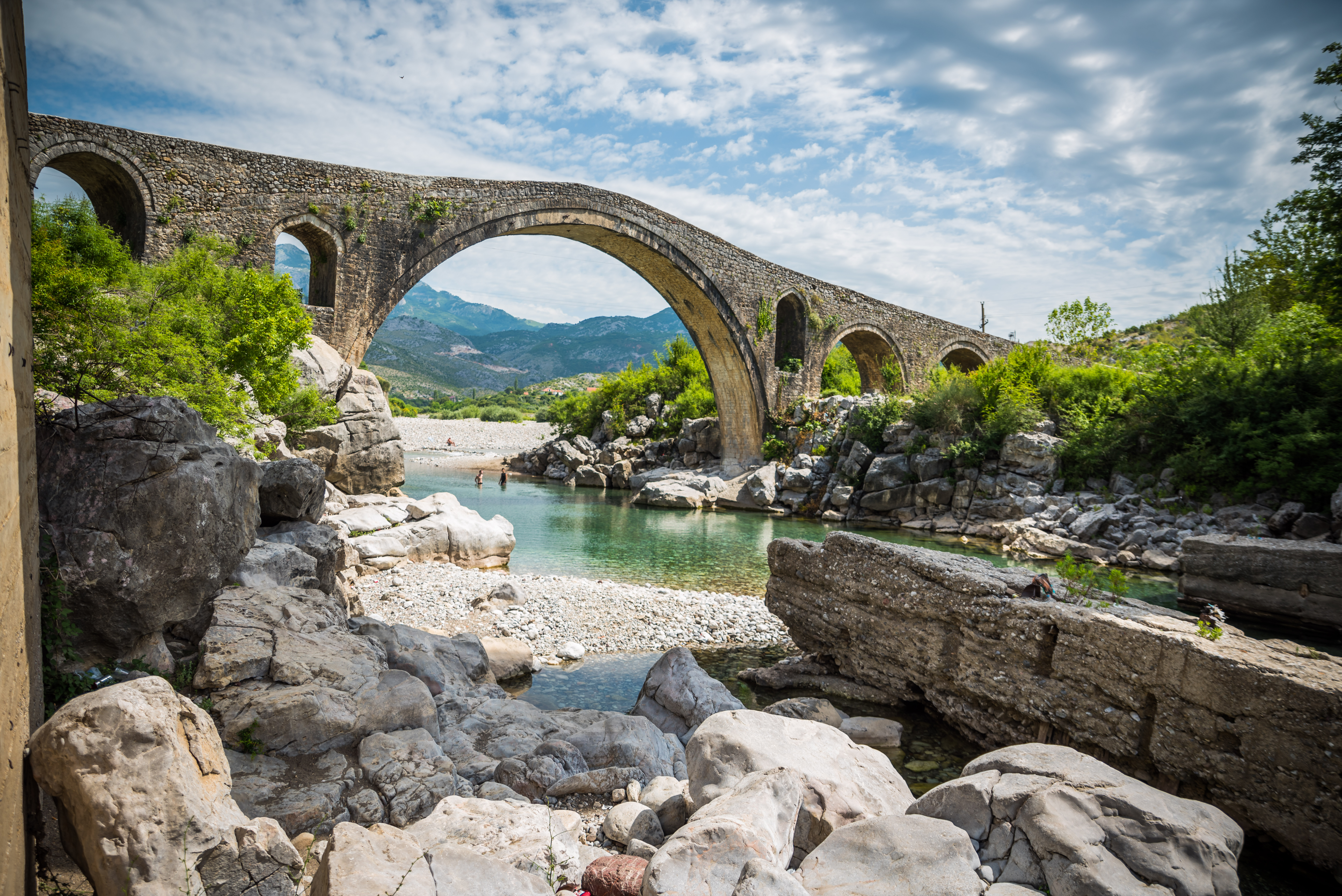
- Coordinates: 42.1144°N 19.5749°E
- Crosses: Kir River
- Locale: Mes, Albania
- Official name: Mes Bridge

Characteristics
- Total length: 108 m (354 ft)

History
- Construction end: 1770

Location
- Interactive map of Mesi Bridge

Mesi Bridge (Albanian: Ura e Mesit, lit. 'The bridge in the middle') is an Ottoman-era bridge in the village of Mes, about 5 km (3.1 miles) northeast of Shkodër, in northwestern Albania. It is a monument of Postribë culture, turning the site into a tourist attraction with a lot of visitors from all around the world. For foreigners the architecture of the bridge is intriguing with round slick stones and stone plates. The surrounding panorama gives the bridge an even more picturesque view. The Albanian Development Fund invested 13 million ALL so the tourists could step on the bridge and watch it closely because there was no entry way to the bridge.

It was built in the 18th century, around 1770, by Kara Mahmud Bushati, the local Ottoman Albanian pasha, and spans the Kir River. The building was divided in 2 phases. In 1768, the first phase began with only the large middle arc and 3 smaller arches (specifically, one on the right and two on the left). Shortly after construction, it became clear that due to seasonal flooding, a much longer structure would be required. In 1770, the bridge was extended to its current length by adding the remaining arches, and adding a 14° bend near the main arch to follow the rock formations in the riverbed for better stability.

The purpose was to connect the city of Shkodër with the city of Drisht and other cities of the northern side. It is 108 m (354 ft) long, 3.4 m (11 ft) meters wide, 12.5 m (41 ft) meters high with 13 arches, and is one of the longest examples of an Ottoman bridge in the region. It was built as part of the road that goes up the Kir Valley, eventually to Pristina.

Today the bridge is at risk, having been damaged over time by devastating floods, which have resulted in floodwaters cutting away at the arches on the right side, causing cracking.

== Gallery ==
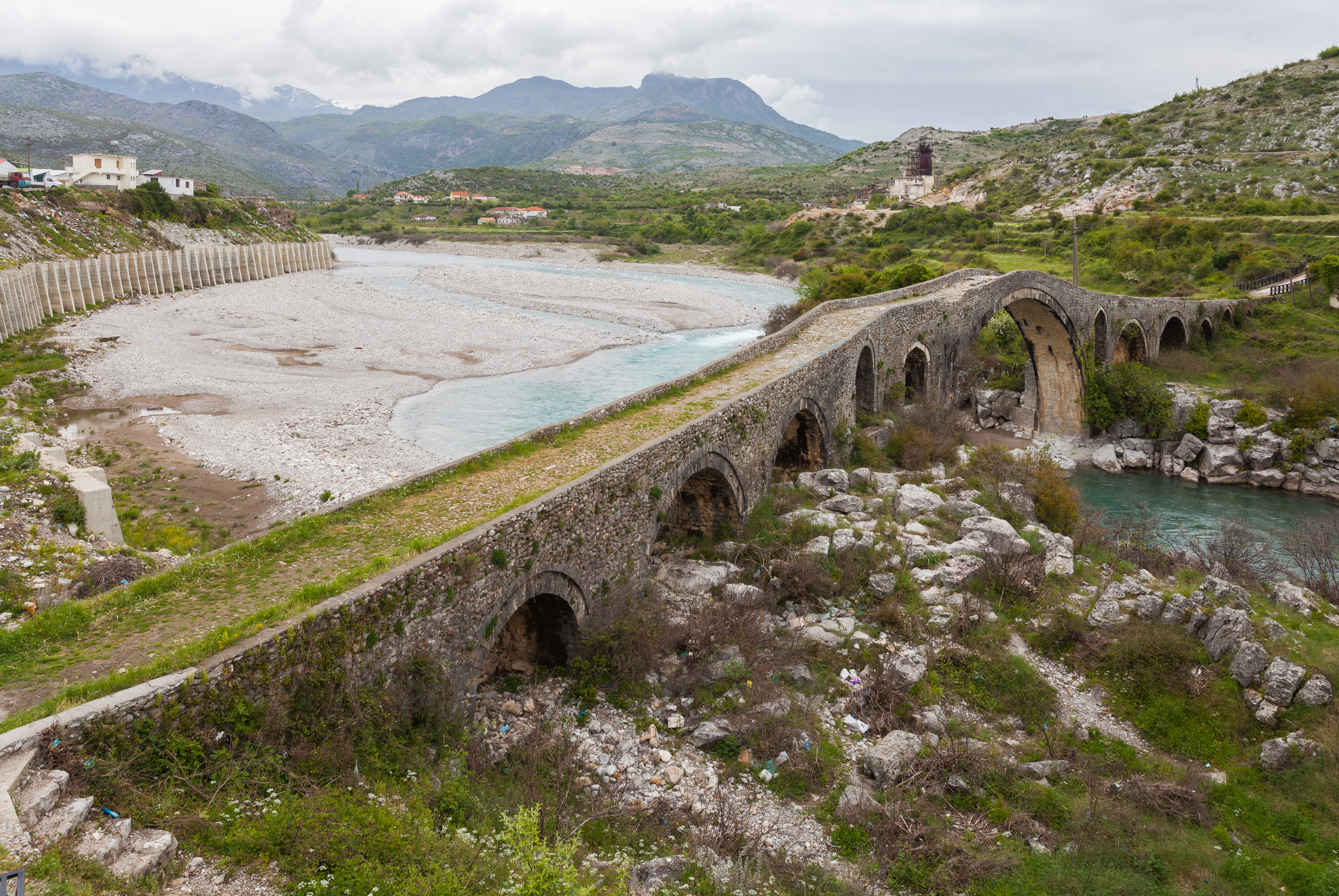

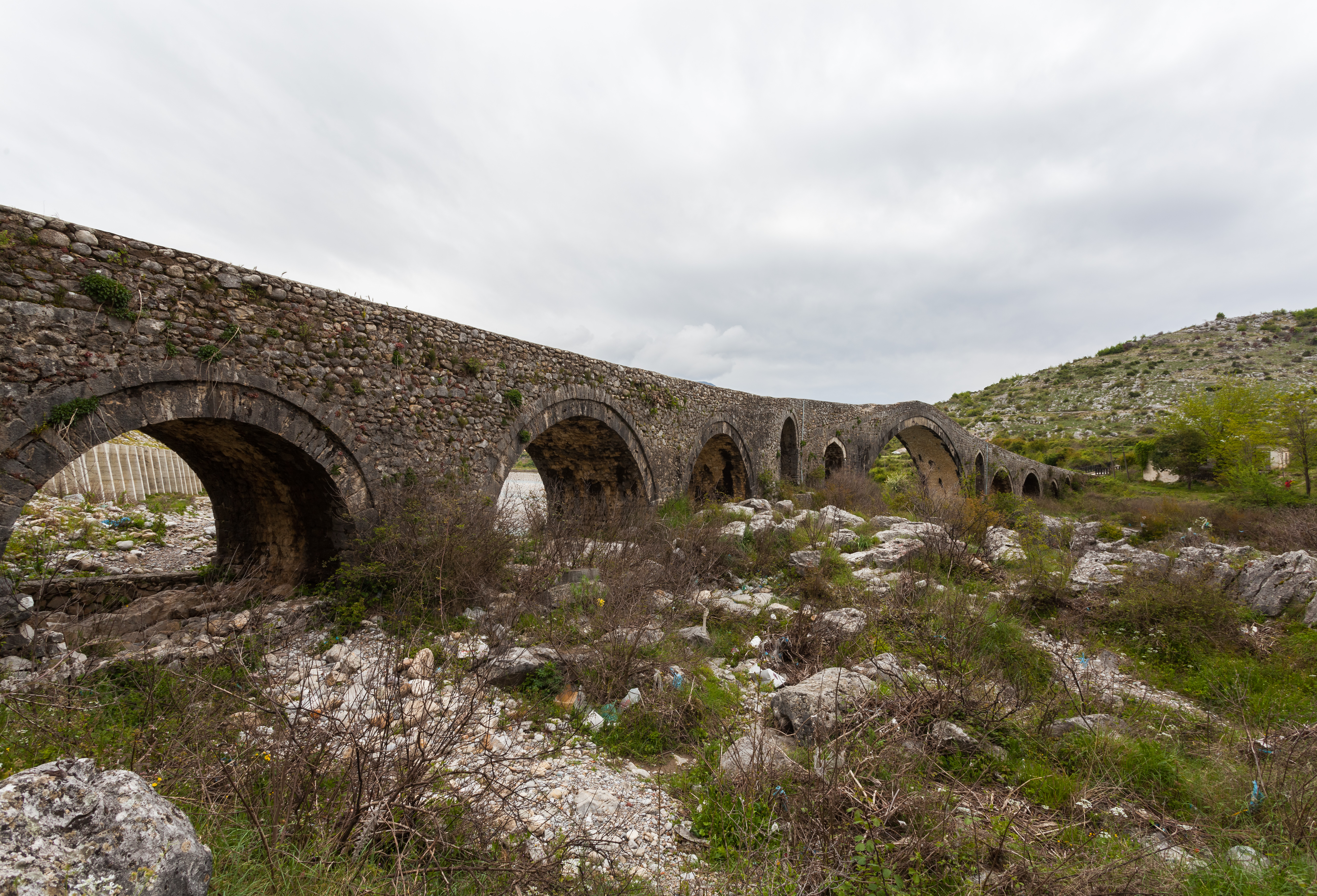

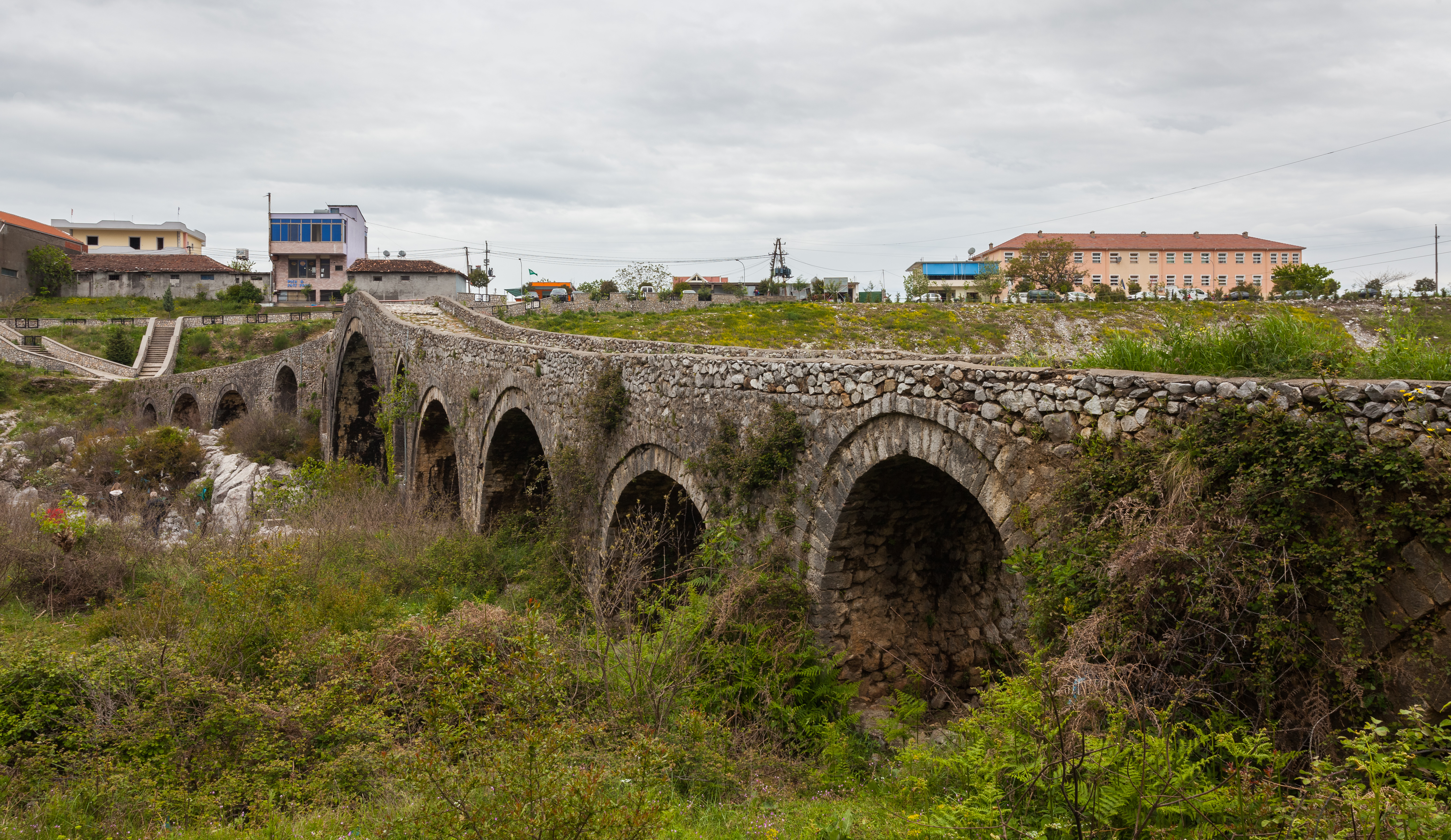

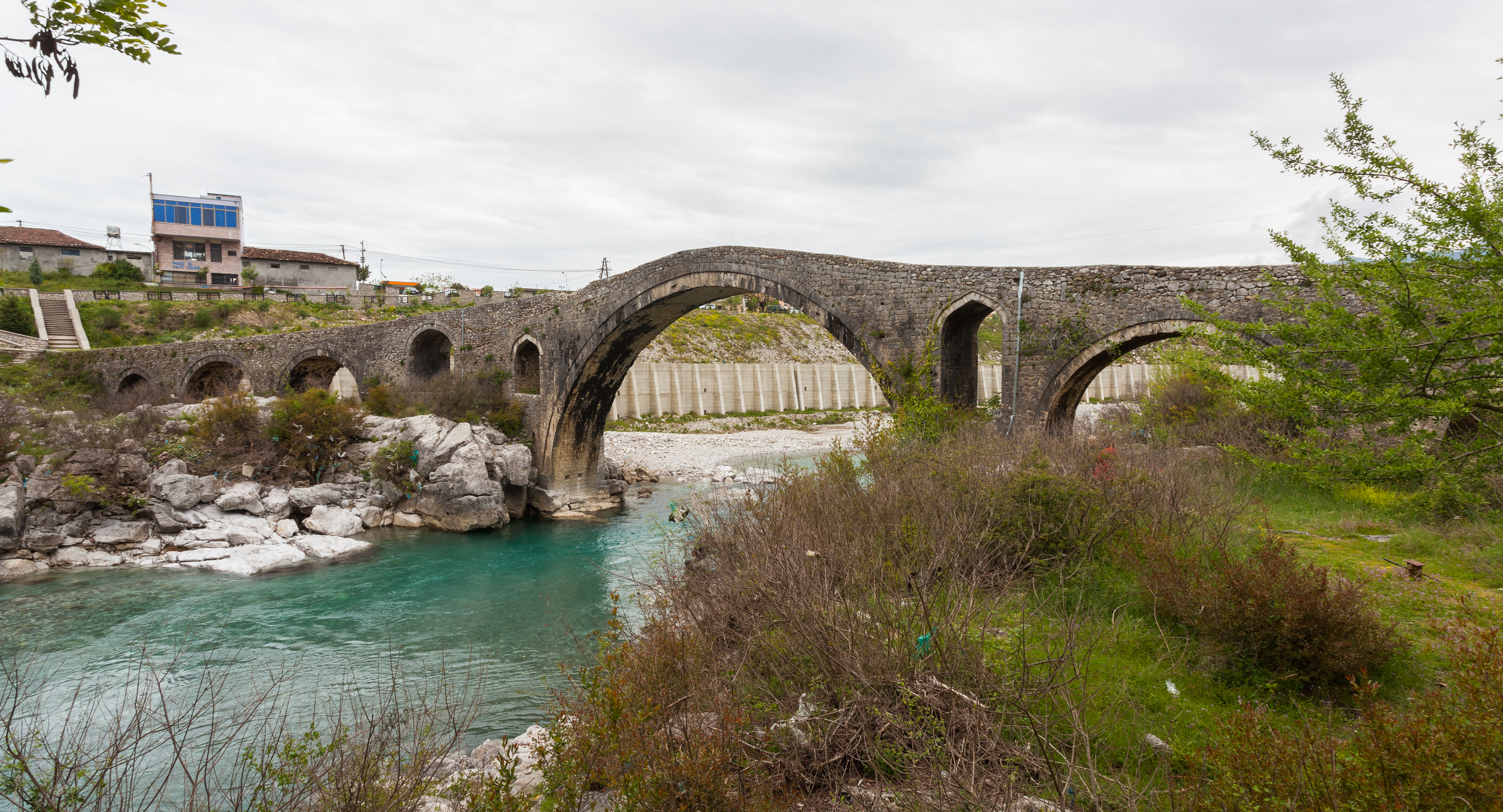

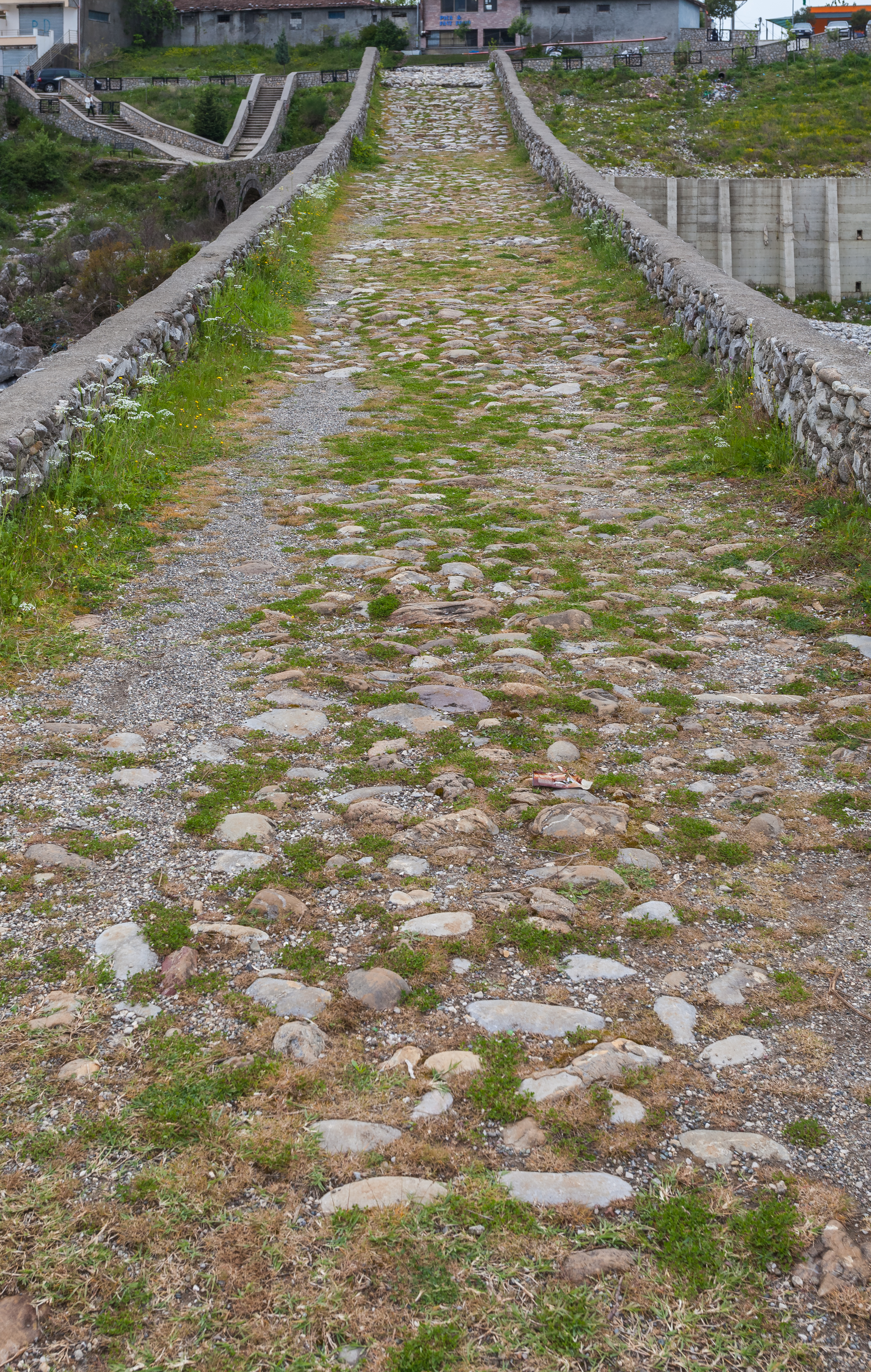

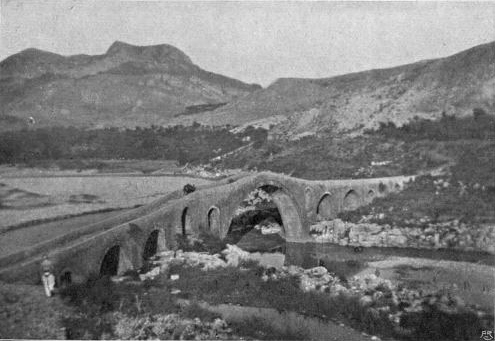
Mes Bridge, 1906
