= Zogu Bridge =

Mat Bridge Ura e Matit
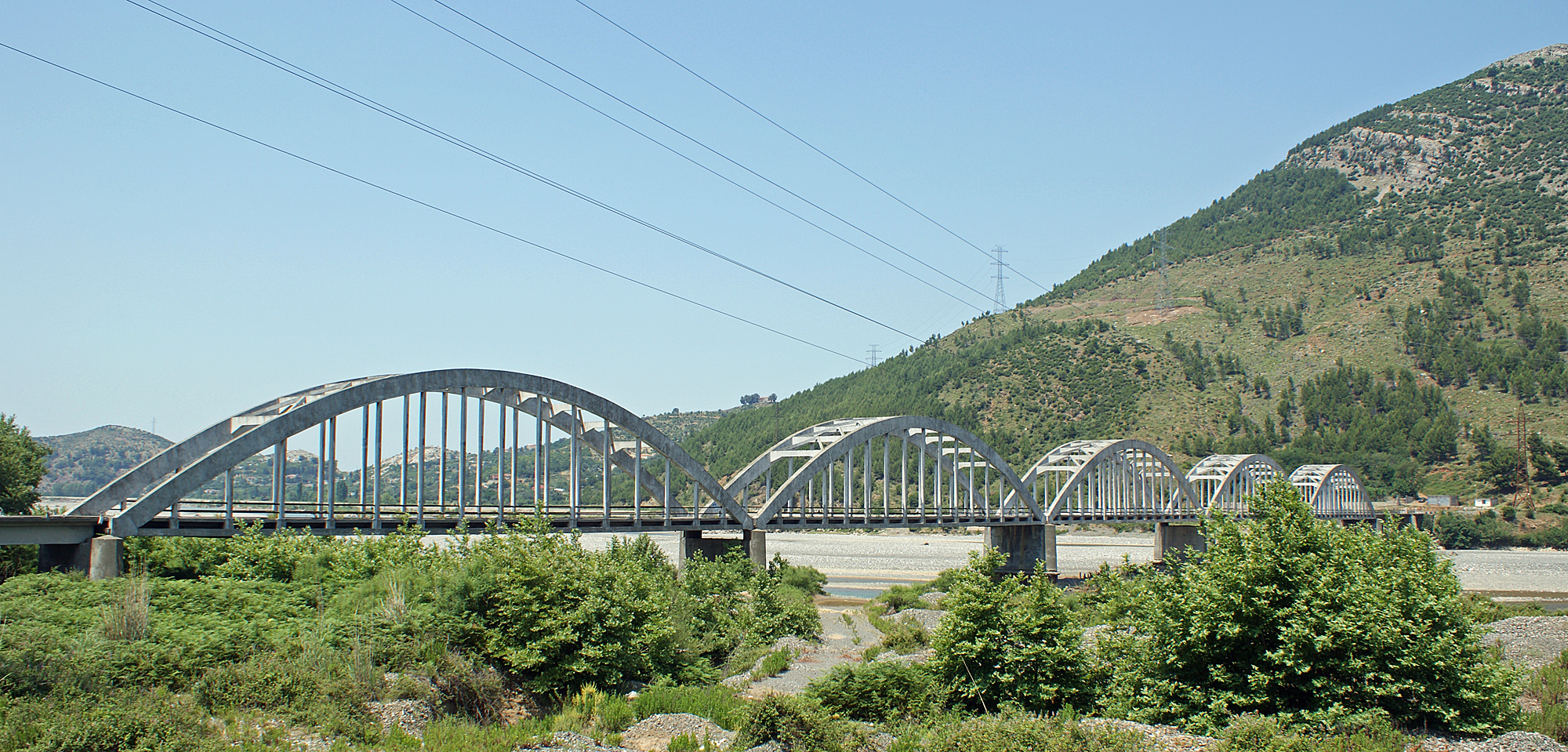
- Coordinates: 41.698°N 19.726°E
- Crosses: Mat River
- Locale: Milot, Albania
- Official name: Mat Bridge

Characteristics
- Total length: 480 m (1,570 ft)
- Height: 10.5
- Longest span: 54

History
- Construction end: 1927

Location
- Interactive map of Mat Bridge

Mat Bridge or Zogu Bridge is a bridge across the Mat river near the town of Milot in the northwestern part of Albania. It served to improve communications between south-central Albania and the northern part of the country, particularly to the northern town of Shkodër.

Designed by Swiss and German engineers, it is 480 metres (1,570 ft) in length and constructed in five steel arches carried across the river on concrete piers. It was named after the first King of Albania, King Zog, who ruled from 1928 until the country was invaded by Benito Mussolini in 1939.

It remained the first and only permanent bridge over the Mat for 50 years, when a second bridge was built. A third was built 25 years after that.

== See also ==
- List of bridges in Albania
