= Mes, Albania =

Mes
- Village
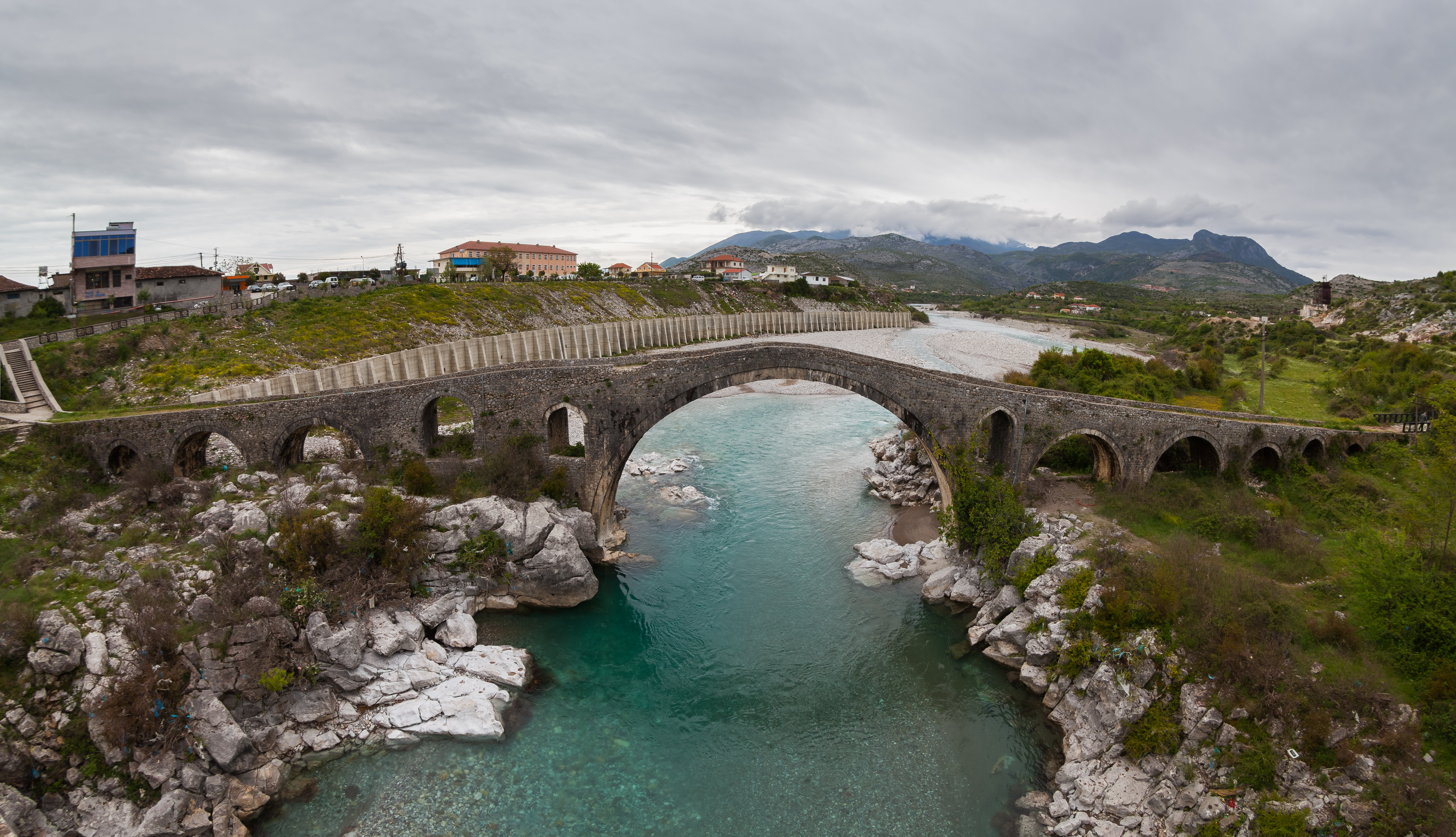
- The village of Mes with the Mes bridge in the background

- Location within Albania
- Coordinates: 42°6′18″N 19°34′11″E
- Country: Albania
- County: Shkodër
- Municipality: Shkodër
- Administrative unit: Postribë
- Time zone: UTC+1 (CET)
  - Summer (DST): UTC+2 (CEST)

Mes (Albanian: [ˈmɛs]; Albanian definite form: Mesi) is a village in the former municipality of Postribë in Shkodër County, Albania. At the 2015 local government reform it became part of the municipality of Shkodër.

== Mesi Bridge ==
The village is most famous for the Mesi Bridge over the river Kir, a designated Category I cultural monument of Albania. It is stone bridge constructed in 1768 by Mehmed Pasha Bushati during the Pashalik period in Ottoman Albania, and is the biggest of its kind in Albania still intact, measuring 108m in length.
