= Kamara Bridge =

Bridge in Elbasan County, Albania

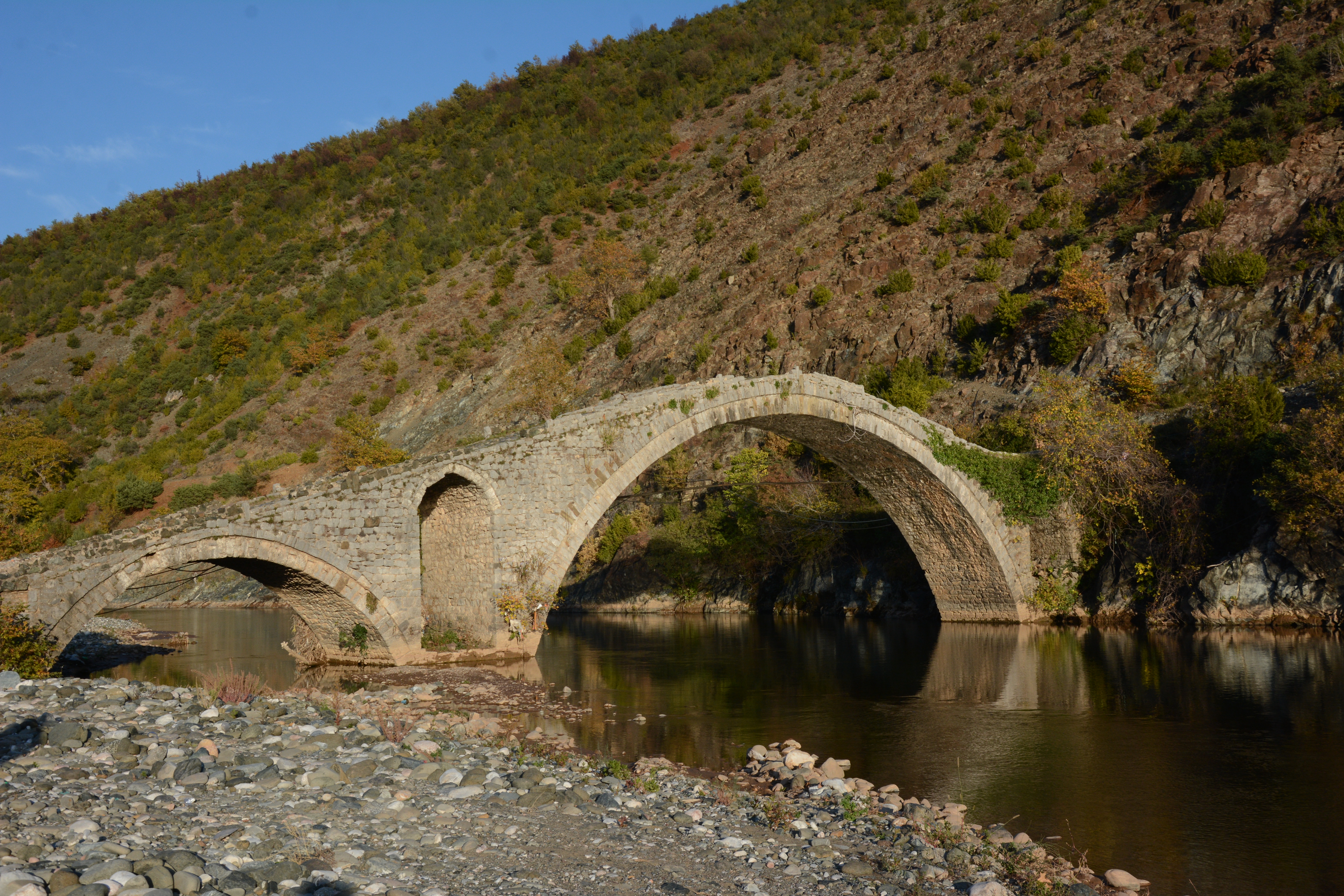
- Kamara Bridge over the Shkumbin River
- Coordinates: 41°10′14.9628″N 20°15′41.6502″E
- Carries: pedestrian (historically caravan route)
- Crosses: Shkumbin
- Locale: Mirakë, Librazhd, Elbasan County, Albania
- Heritage status: Cultural Monument of Albania (Category I, 1963)

Characteristics
- Design: asymmetrical stone arch bridge
- Material: Stone
- Total length: 40 m
- Width: 3.5 m
- Longest span: 23 m
- No. of spans: 3

History
- Construction start: c. 1714

Location
- Interactive map of Kamara Bridge

Kamara Bridge (Albanian: Ura e Kamares) is an Ottoman stone arch bridge over the Shkumbin river in Mirakë, part of the Librazhd municipality in Elbasan County, Albania. It was declared a Cultural Monument of Albania (Category I) in 1963. It is asymmetrical, built on three stone arches, with boat-shaped drainage openings; the bridge's total length is 40 m (130 ft), with a width of 3.5 m (11 ft); the main span is 23 m (75 ft). The arches are built of the same grey-white stone characteristic of nearby Mount Murrash. Its location above the Shkumbin river made it a key strategic crossing on the ancient Via Egnatia trade route. It is one of the main historical sites in the region, attracting domestic and international tourists.

== History ==
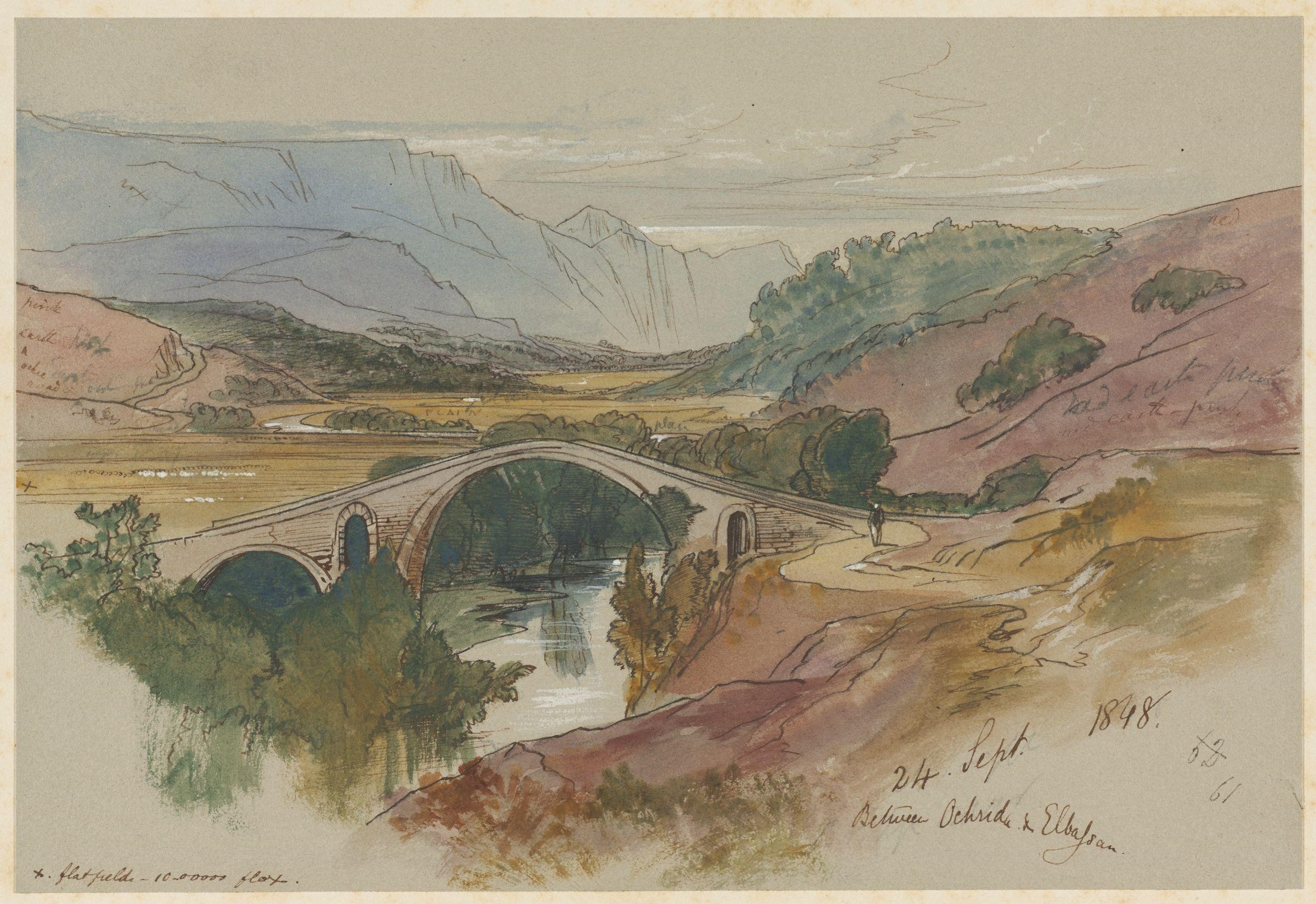
Kamara Bridge by Edward Lear, 1848.

Kamara Bridge dates to around 1714. It underwent reconstruction during the Ottoman period. It formed a strategic point on the ancient Via Egnatia caravan route from Elbasan via the Haxhi Beqari Bridge to Korçë (formerly in Greece, now in North Macedonia) and Istanbul, with a secondary branch toward Dibër via Klenjë and Zerqan. A stone plaque in one arch reads:

Shpirti i qoftë gëzuar Ahmetit, nga Elbasani. Kush kalon këtej të japë një lutje mirëbërësit të urës.

May Ahmeti of Elbasan have a joyful soul. Whoever crosses here, offer a prayer to the benefactor of this bridge.

== Conservation ==
A 2017 engineering study reported foundation damage on the rock-supported arch, attributed to seismic events (up to magnitude 8), material ageing, and limited maintenance, with the last reinforcement made in 1930 by the Society for the Economic Development of Albania (SVEA). In June 2018, specialists from the National Institute of Cultural Heritage conducted an on-site survey to document conservation issues and prepare a restoration plan. Despite this, no major maintenance occurred, leading to further calls for restoration in 2021. The National Council of Restorations, on the National Institute of Cultural Heritage's proposal, approved a protected zone around the bridge to preserve both the structure and its surrounding landscape.
