= Gorica Bridge =

Gorica Bridge Ura e Goricës
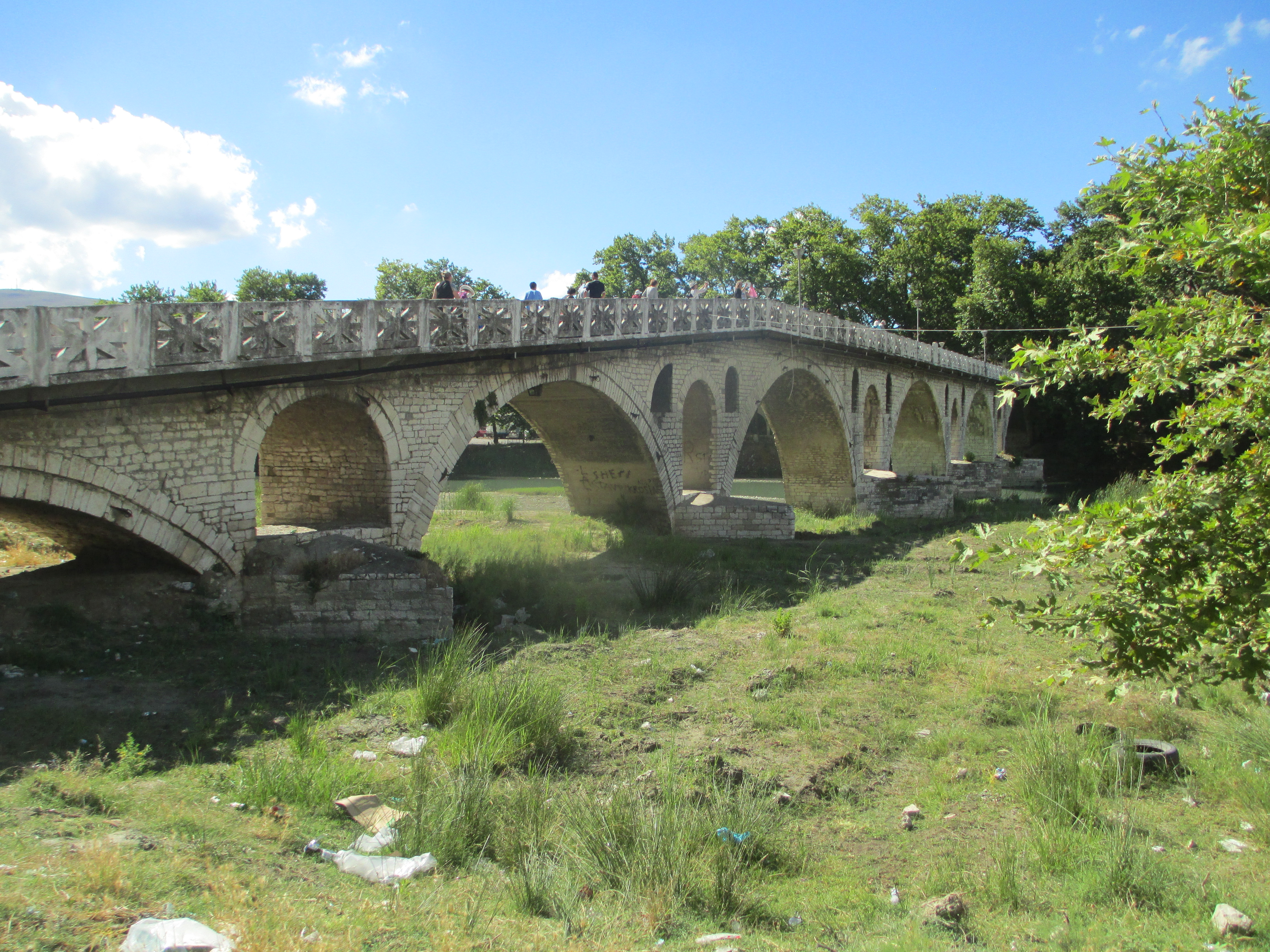
- Coordinates: 40.703°N 19.944°E
- Crosses: Osum River
- Locale: Berat, Albania

Characteristics
- Total length: 129 m (423 ft)

History
- Construction start: 1777
- Construction end: 1927

Location
- Interactive map of Gorica Bridge

Gorica Bridge or Kurt Ahmed Pasha bridge (Albanian: Ura e Ahmet Kurt Pashës) over the Osum river is an Ottoman-era landmark in the city of Berat, Albania.

Built after 1777 by Ahmet Kurt Pasha, the ruler of the Pashalik of Berat, it is one of the oldest and most popular Ottoman bridges in Albania. It connects two parts of Berat, was originally built from wood in 1780 and was rebuilt with stone in the 1920s. The seven-arch bridge is 129 metres (423 feet) long and 5.3 metres (17 feet) wide and is built about 10 metres (33 feet) above the average water level. The bridge was renovated in year 2015 by Bashkia Berat (the Municipality of Berat).

According to local legend, the original wooden bridge contained a dungeon in which a girl would be incarcerated and starved to appease the spirits responsible for the safety of the bridge.

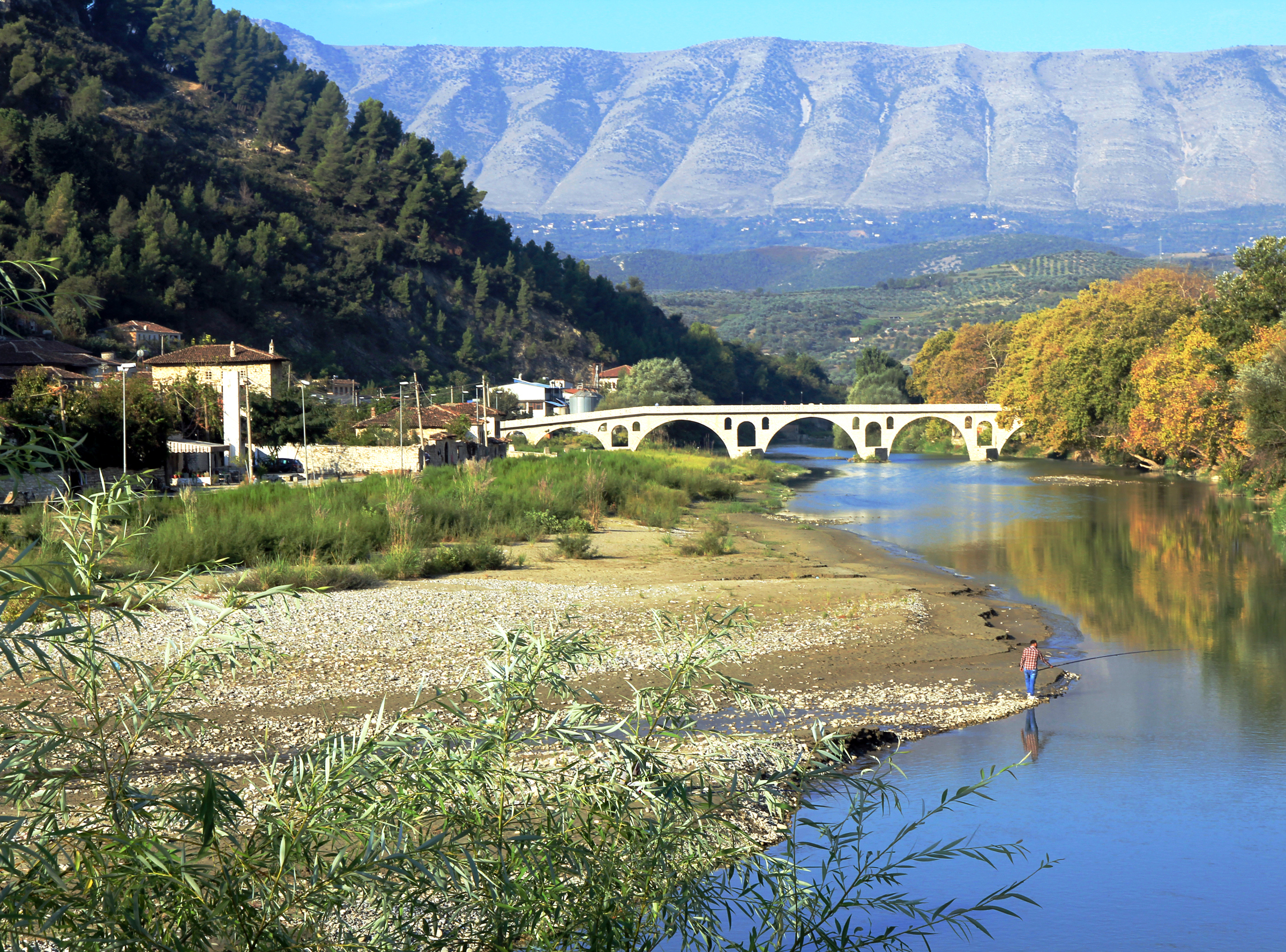
Gorica bridge over river Osum
