= Kordhocë =

- Village
- Location within Albania
- Coordinates: 40°04′N 20°10′E
- Country: Albania
- County: Gjirokastër
- Municipality: Gjirokastër
- Administrative unit: Lazarat
- Time zone: UTC+1 (CET)
  - Summer (DST): UTC+2 (CEST)

Kordhocë is a village in the Gjirokastër County in Albania. At the 2015 local government reform it became part of the municipality Gjirokastër. It is known for the Kordhocë bridge.

== Geography ==
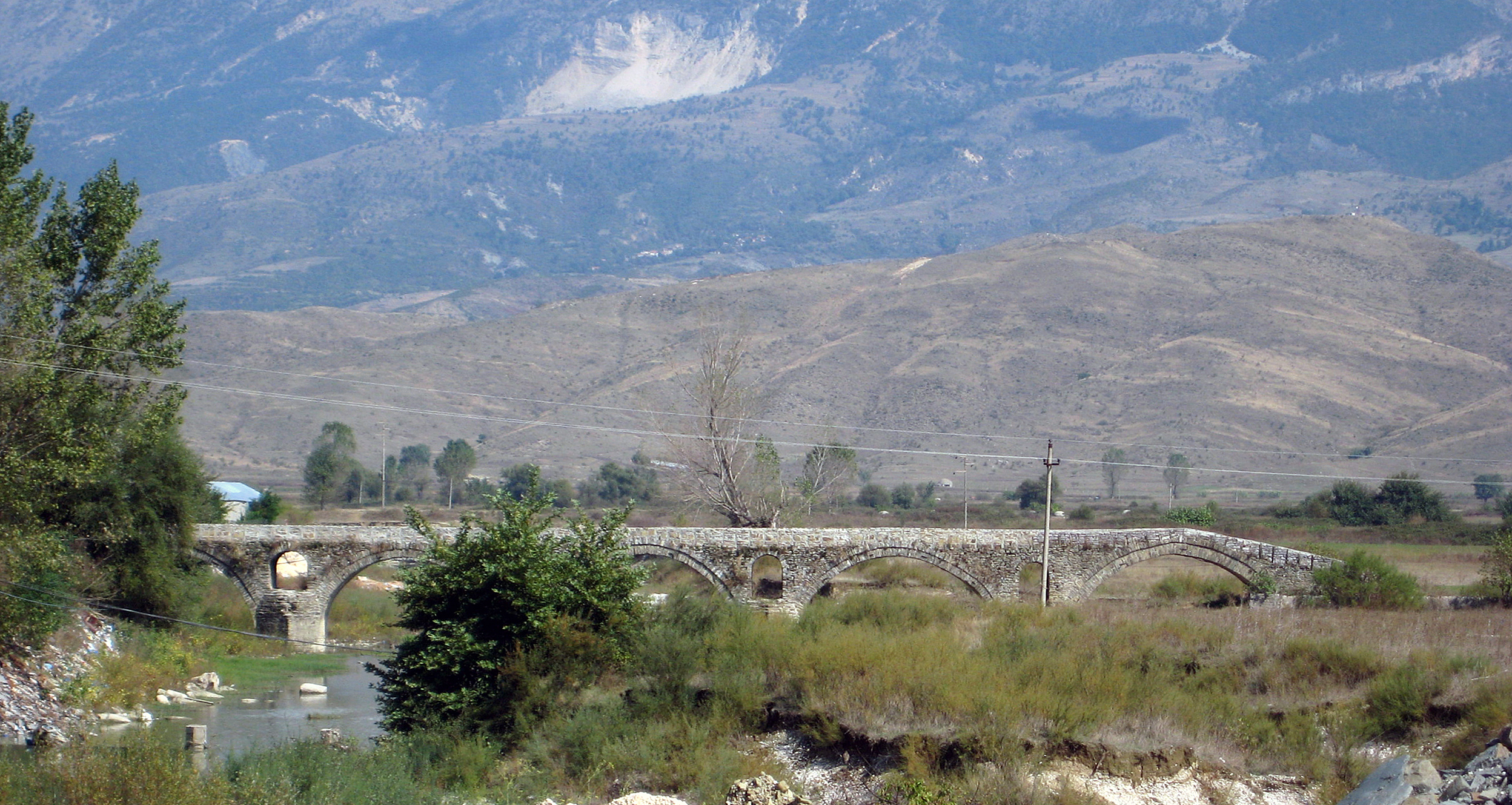
Kordhocë bridge

Kordhocë is a village just outside Gjirokastër, situated on mountain slope of Mali i Gjerë.

== Population ==
Kordhocë is inhabited by Muslim Albanians. The villagers speak in the Tosk dialect of the Albanian language.

== Economy ==
The main activity is agriculture, especially animal husbandry. The area is known for its dairy products.
