= Kordhocë bridge =

The Kordhocë Bridge Ura e Kordhocës
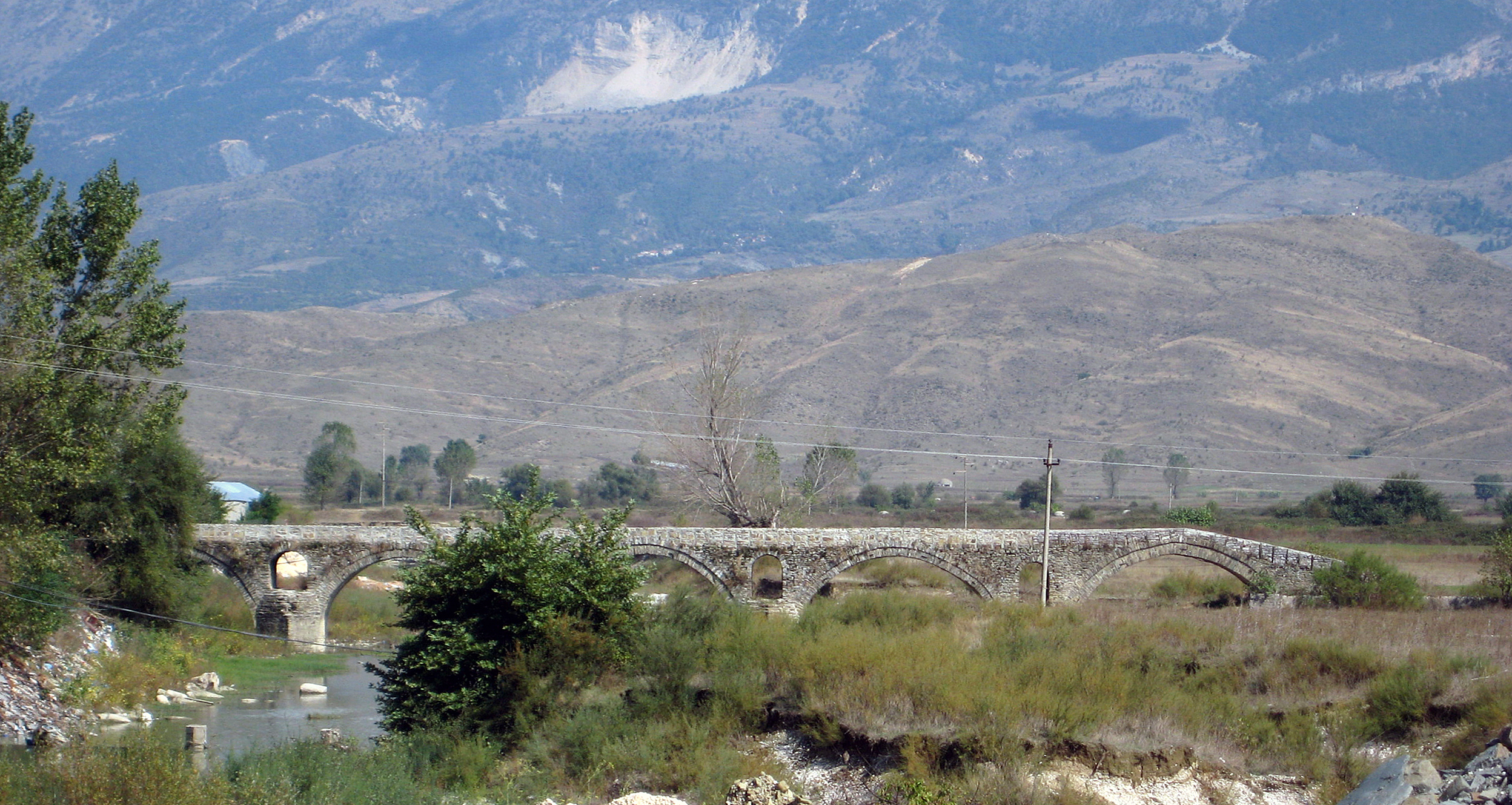
- The Kordhocë Bridge
- Coordinates: 40°03′40″N 20°10′25″E

Characteristics
- Material: Stone
- Total length: 20 m (66 ft)
- Width: 4 m (13 ft)
- Height: 7 m (23 ft)

History
- Construction end: 1820

Location
- Interactive map of The Kordhocë Bridge; Ura e Kordhocës

The Kordhocë Bridge is an Ottoman Turkish stone arch bridge in the village of Kordhocë in Albania and about two kilometers south of Gjirokastër. It spans the Drino river at a maximum height of about 7 meters. It is about 20 metres long and 3.7 meters wide and is one of the most important buildings of the Ottoman period in Epirus.

According to historians, it was built around 1820 and at that time was the main hub connecting three cities, Gjirokastër, Libohovë and Janina. It is currently an important link between the Mali i Gjerë area and Dropull.

Some scenes of three films, Muri i Gjallë, Dasma e Sakos and Ja liri, ja vdekje, were shot on the bridge.
