= Arbër Highway =

Future road in Europe

- Rruga e Arbërit
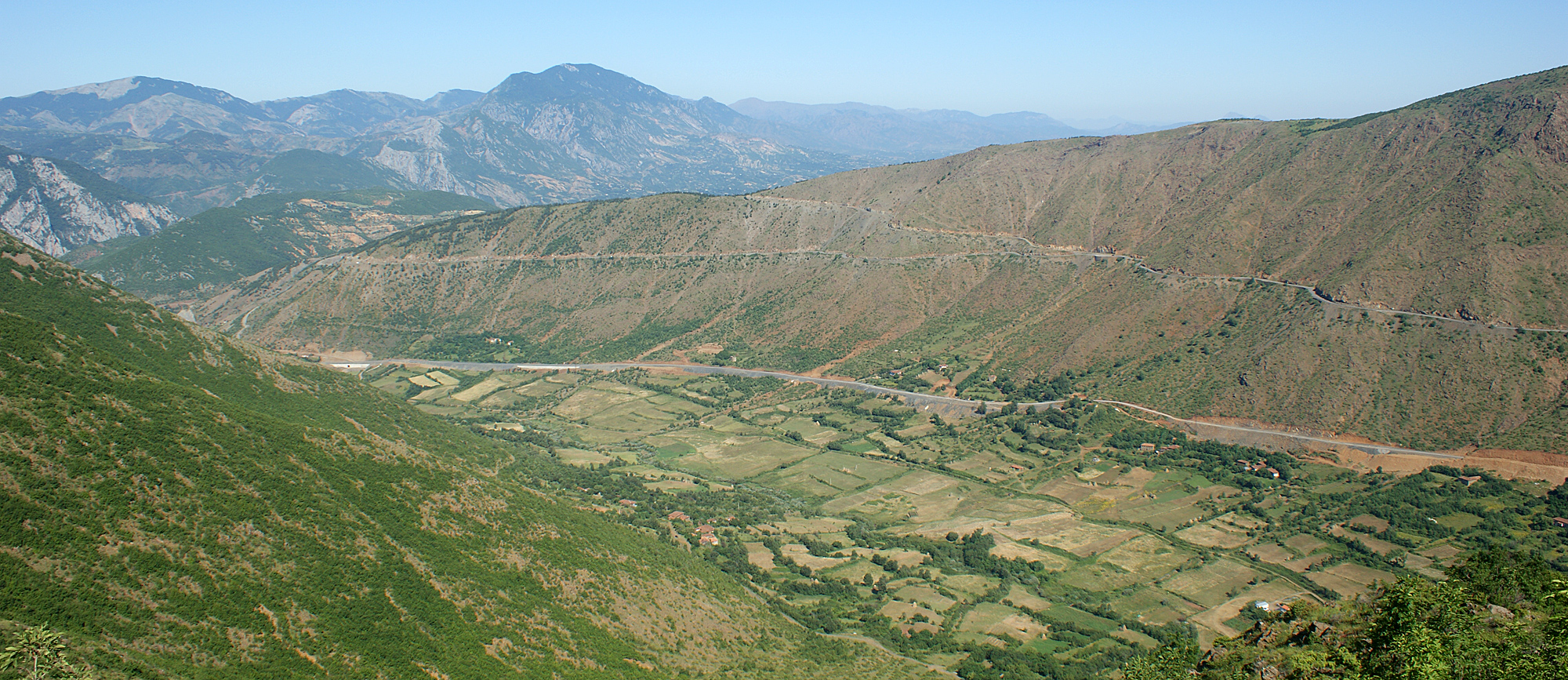

Route information
- Length: 170 km (110 mi)

Major junctions
- From: Albania
- To: Republic of North Macedonia

Location
- Country: Albania
- Major cities: Tirana, Debar

Highway system
- Highways in Albania

The Arbër Highway (Albanian: Rruga e Arbrit) part of SH61 and SH6 is a single carriageway highway between Albania and North Macedonia. The highway stretches along an ancient caravan route passing through the eastern highlands of Tirana along SH61, and ending at the current SH6 in Diber County.

== See also ==
- A1 motorway (Albania)
- Transport in Albania
