= Postribë =

- Administrative unit
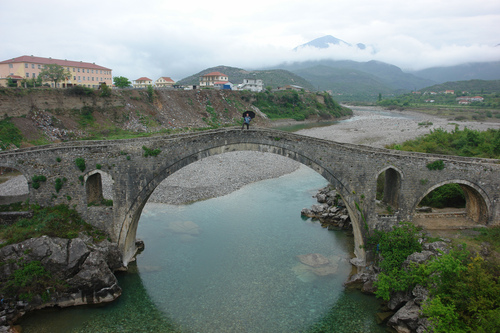
- Bridge in Boks, Postribë

- Location within Albania
- Coordinates: 42°7′N 19°36′E
- Country: Albania
- County: Shkodër
- Municipality: Shkodër

Population (2011)
  - Administrative unit: 7,069
- Time zone: UTC+1 (CET)
  - Summer (DST): UTC+2 (CEST)

Postribë is a former municipality in the Shkodër County, northwestern Albania. At the 2015 local government reform it became a subdivision of the municipality Shkodër. The population at the 2011 census was 7,069. It includes the village of Urë e Shtrenjtë. It contains three Bajraks, those being Boks, Drishti and Suma.
