= Kir (river) =

River in Albania

Kir Lumi i Kirit
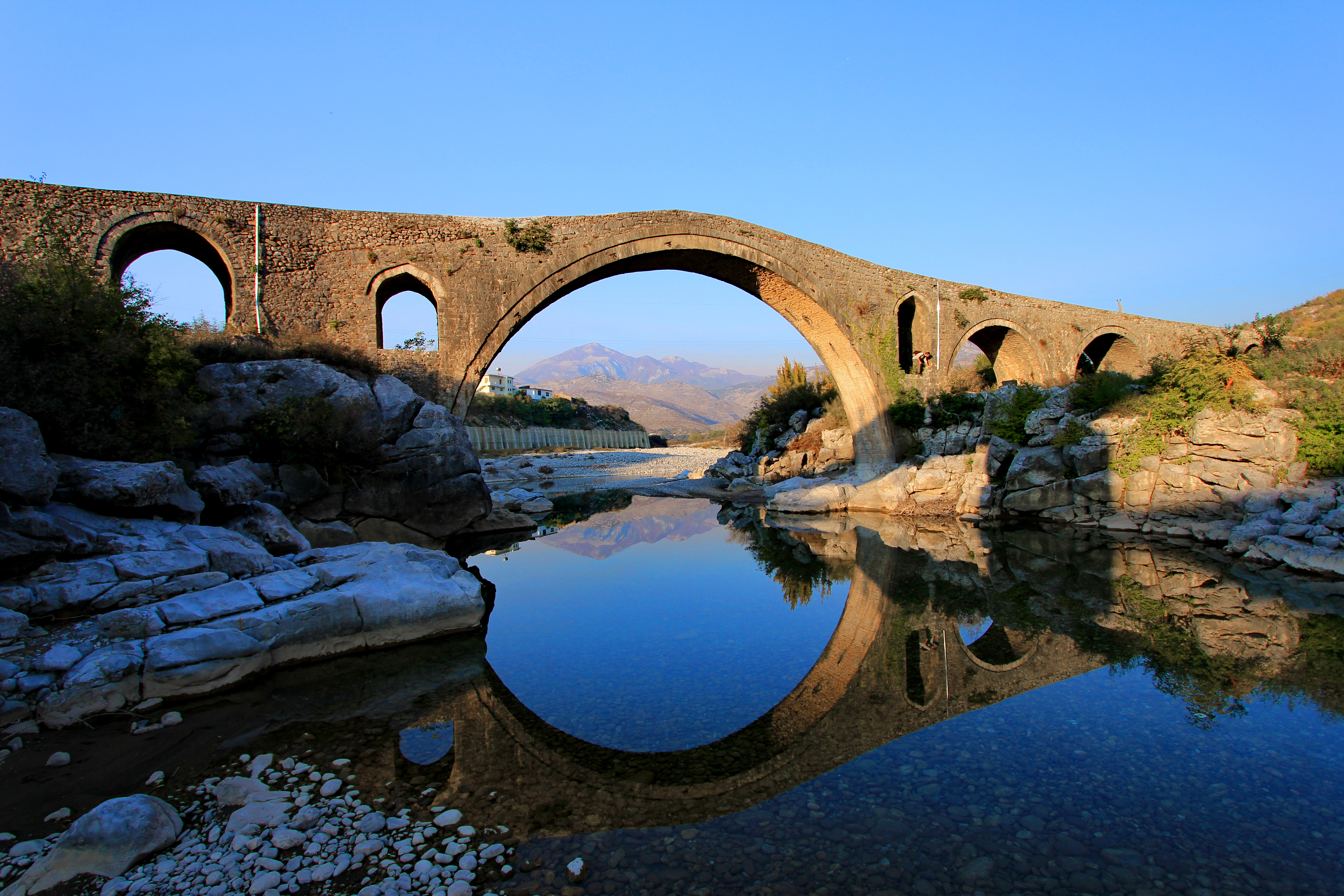
- Kir river stream flowing under the Mesi Bridge

Location
- Country: Albania

Physical characteristics
- Source
  - location: Albanian Alps
- Mouth
  - location: Great Drin
  - coordinates: 42°02′35″N 19°29′56″E
  - elevation: 6 m (20 ft)
- Length: 52 km (32 mi)

Basin features
- Progression: Great Drin→ Bojana→ Adriatic Sea

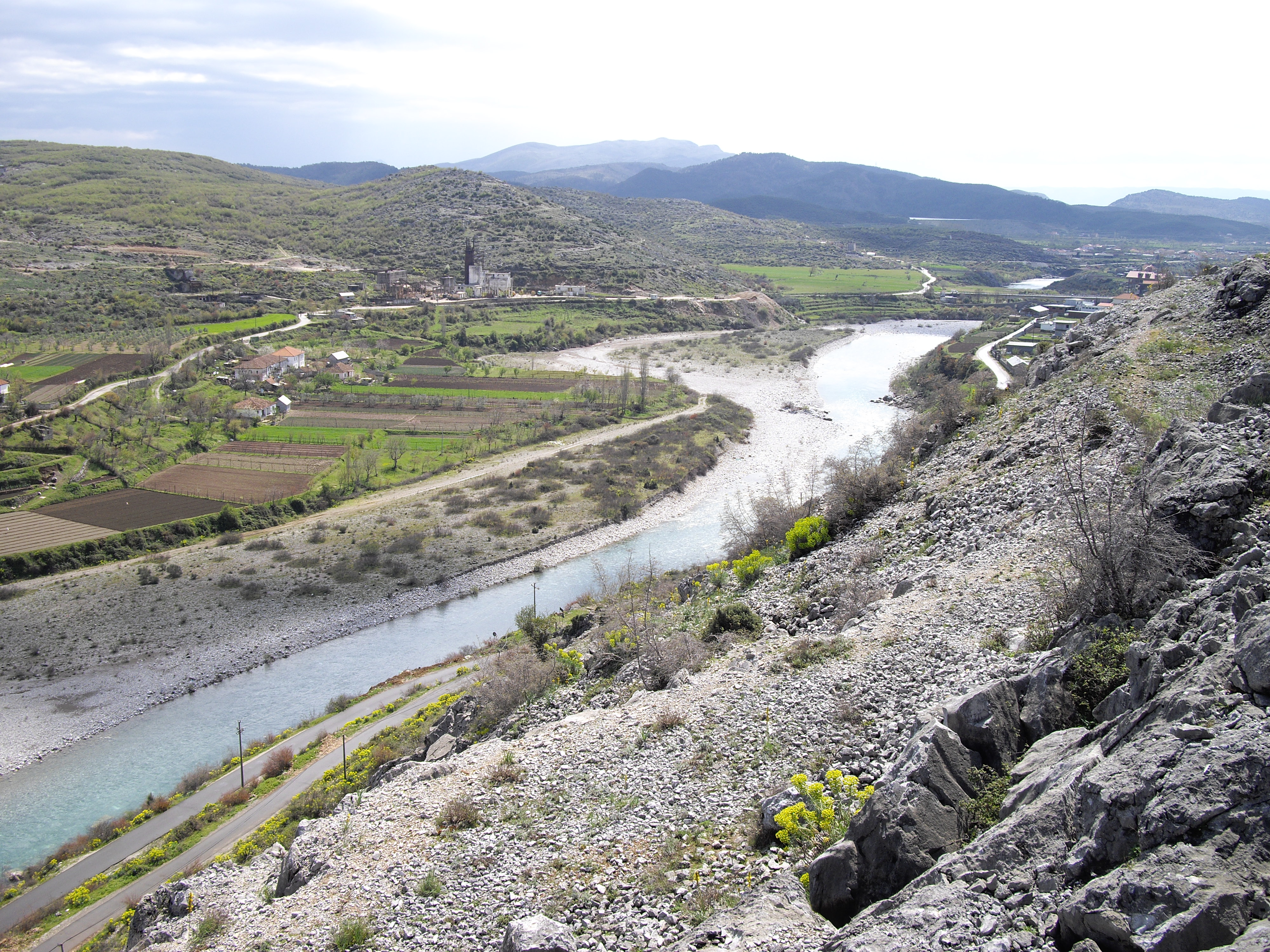
Kir River near Boks

The Kir (Albanian: Kir or Kiri) is a river in northern Albania that first flows south-southwest and then southwest out of the North Albanian Alps and enters a distributary of the Drin just below Shkodër.

In the upper reaches the river cuts the "Canyon of the Kir" with dramatic cliffs.The Albanian tribe or fis of Kiri inhabited this area. Just outside Shkodër, in Mes, the old stone Mes Bridge crosses the Kir.

== Name ==
The Kir was first mentioned in antiquity by the Roman historian Livy as Clausala and in the fifth-century Tabula Peutingeriana as Cleusis. The modern name is first recorded by Marin Barleti in 1474 as Kiri. Jacques de Lavardin's 1576 French translation of Barleti's work Histoire de Georges Castriot, surnommé Scanderberg, roy d'Albanie (Historie of George Castriot, Surnamed Scanderbeg, King of Albanie) mentions the river as Clyre. The apostolic visitor to Albania, Pietro Stefano Gaspari, mentioned Chiri in his ecclesiastical report of 1671. The toponym is found in Venetian and Italian cartography as Kiri (1688), Chirli (1689) and Chiri (1691). While all of these mentions refer to the river and not the tribe inhabiting its banks, Franz Nopsca records an instance of the toponym as a personal name in 1364 (Nilus Chirist).
