= Milot (town) =

- Administrative unit
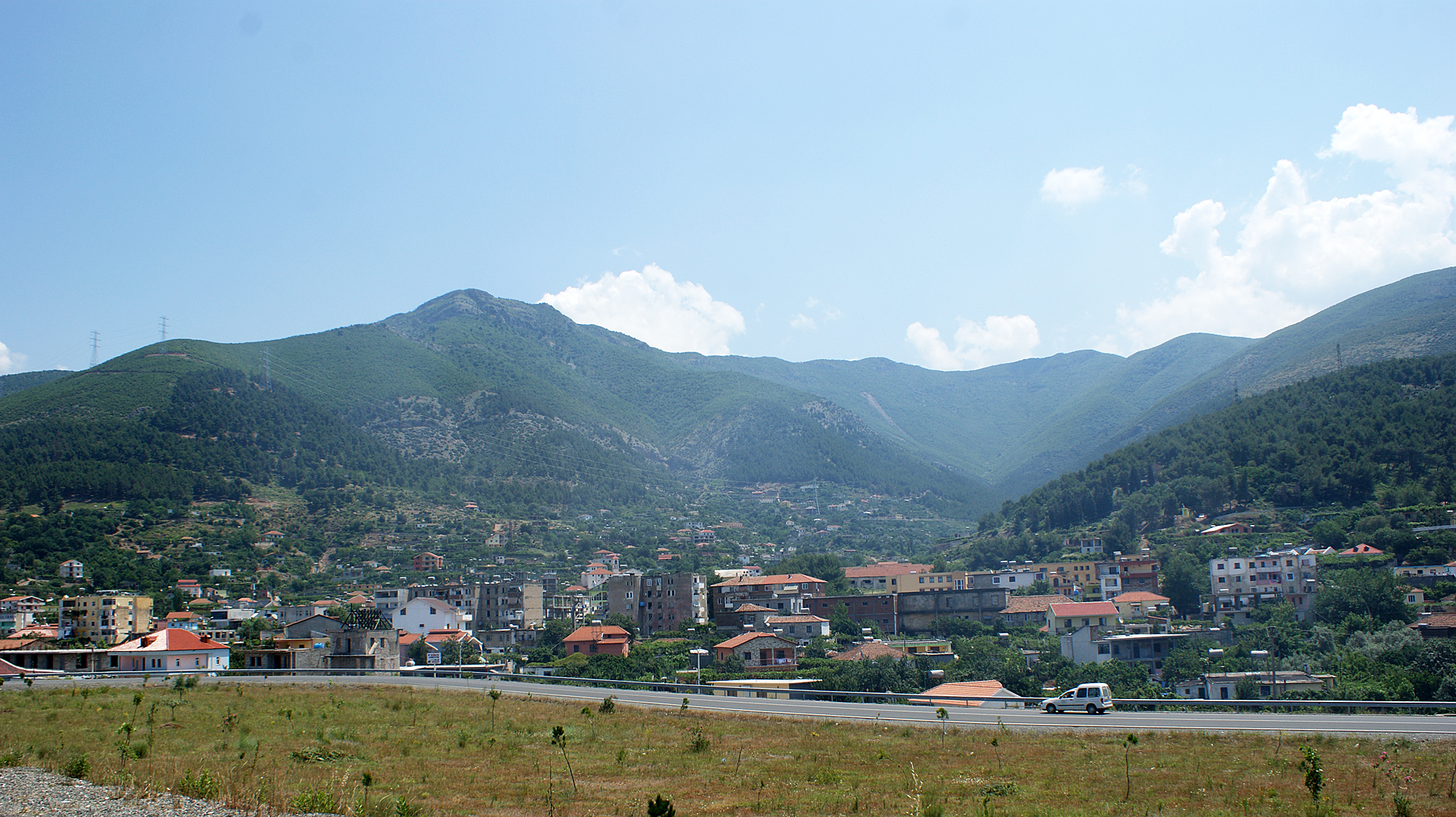

- Location within Albania
- Coordinates: 41°41′N 19°43′E
- Country: Albania
- County: Lezhë
- Municipality: Kurbin

Area
  - Total: 138 km^{2} (53 sq mi)
- Elevation: 25 m (82 ft)

Population (2023)
  - Total: 6,193
  - Density: 44.9/km^{2} (116/sq mi)
- Time zone: UTC+1 (CET)
  - Summer (DST): UTC+2 (CEST)

Milot is a town and a former municipality in the Lezhë County of northwestern Albania. At the 2015 local government reform it became a subdivision of the municipality Kurbin. The population at the 2023 census was 6,193.

The municipal unit of Milot is composed of the town of Milot and 14 villages, including Fushë Milot, Mal i Bardhë, Vinjoll, Shkopet, Ferr-Shkopet and Skuraj.

The town stands on the southern bank of the Mat River. Nearby is the well-known Zogu Bridge named after the leader Zog I of Albania. The bridge was built in 1927 to cross the Mat river and improve access to the north-west of the country.

== History ==
On 7 September 1457, the Battle of Ujëbardha occurred in Milot. It was the Second Siege of Krujë when an Albanian army led by Skanderbeg broke the surrounding Ottoman army. The defeat was chronicled in considerable detail by Ottoman chronicler Evliya Çelebi. The Battle of Ujëbardha was one of the greatest victories for Skanderbeg.

The earliest mention of Milot comes from the 1582 Ottoman register of the sanjaks of Ohrid (Krujë, Ishëm, Malësia e Tiranës). In it the settlement's name is recorded as Miljot.

The town is considered the traditional and historical cultural center of Kurbin.

== Notable people ==
- Prenk Pervizi (1897–1977), general of the Zogist army
