= Regalia of Albania =

Royal regalia during the Albanian monarchy

The Regalia of Albania (Albanian: Regalia e Shqipërisë) refers to the royal and noble regalia that is associated with the Albanian monarchy and the country’s medieval aristocracy. Throughout history, various Albanian principalities and noble families maintained their own sets of regalia such as crowns, scepters, etc.

== House of Thopia ==
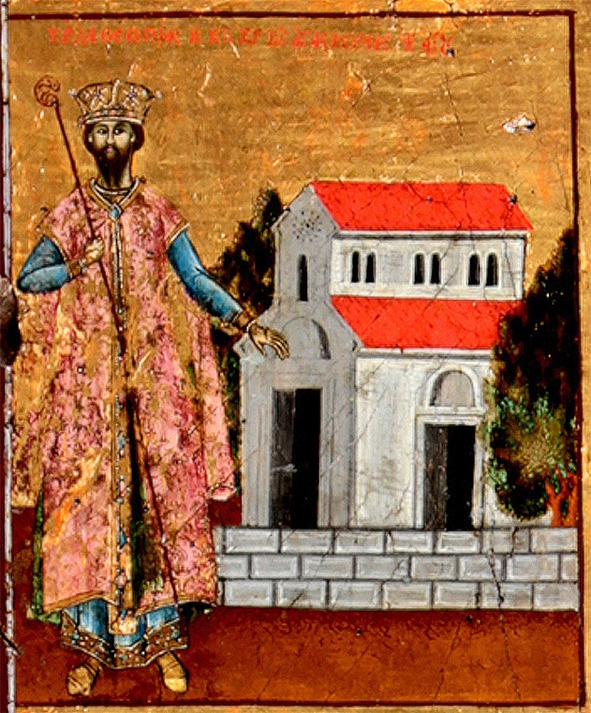
Karl Thopia depicted wearing a crown, scepter, and royal attire, image from the Scenes of the Life of St. Jovan Vladimir, Ardenica Monastery by Kostandin Shpataraku.

The Thopia family possessed regalia which has been recorded in many 14th-century documents. One source from the year 1363, during the rule of Karl Thopia, Prince of Albania, mentioned a crown that was decorated with pearls and precious stones. Other records from the years 1393, 1399, and 1400 described a gold crown and four pairs of pearl earrings that belonged to Gjergj Thopia, Prince of Albania and his wife Teodora Branković, Princess of Albania.

== House of Kastrioti ==
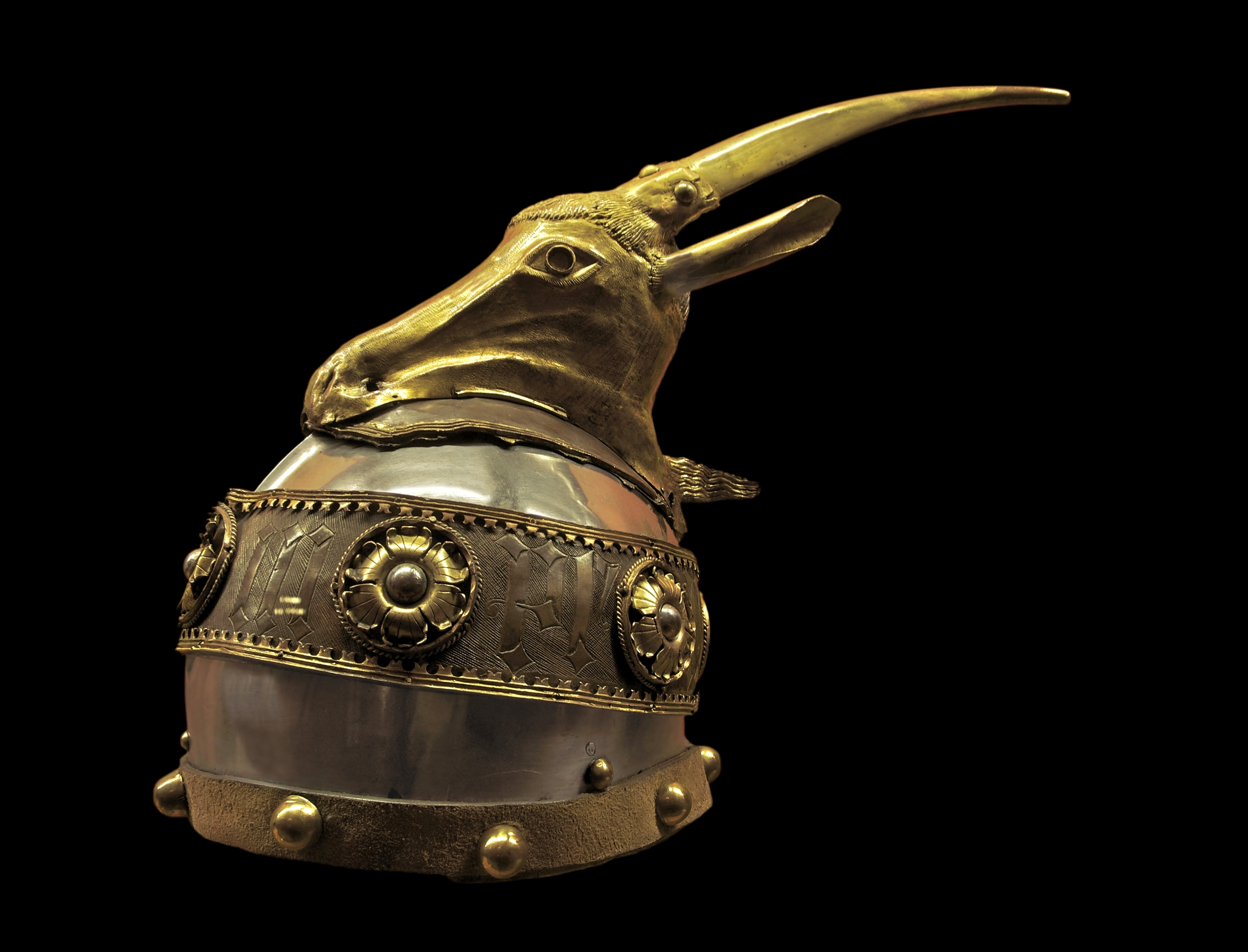
The helmet of the Albanian Leader and General Skanderbeg

The helmet (crown) of Gjergj Kastrioti Skanderbeg, was created in the 15th century and was smuggled out of Albania by members of the Kastrioti noble family, after the Invasion of Albania from the Ottoman Empire. Skanderbeg's helmet is made of white metal, adorned with a strip dressed in gold. On its top lies the head of a horned goat made of bronze, also dressed in gold. The bottom part bears a copper strip adorned with a monogram separated by rosettes. The crown found its way into the collections of the Habsburg dynasty via an Italian noble family and it currently resides in the Imperial Treasury in Vienna, Austria. In 1931, King Zog I made a very rare foreign tour and visited Vienna in an unsuccessful attempt to regain the crown, for a future coronation he even considered giving himself the regnal name "Skanderbeg III" when being crowned. Skanderbeg's helmet gave inspiration to the many Tiaras and Diadems that would be commissioned by the Zogu Family.

== House of Engjëlli ==
The Sacred Military Constantinian Order of Saint George was founded in 1545 by the Albanian noble Engjëlli family. The order was created by Andrea Angelo Flavio Comneno and the order has a distinctive ceremonial structure which includes ranks such as Knight, Knight Commander, and Knight Grand Cross, etc.. Over centuries the order has undergone transitions in leadership but maintains its ceremonial character. The order has its own regalia such as the ceremonial crown, robes, and collar.

Cross of the Order

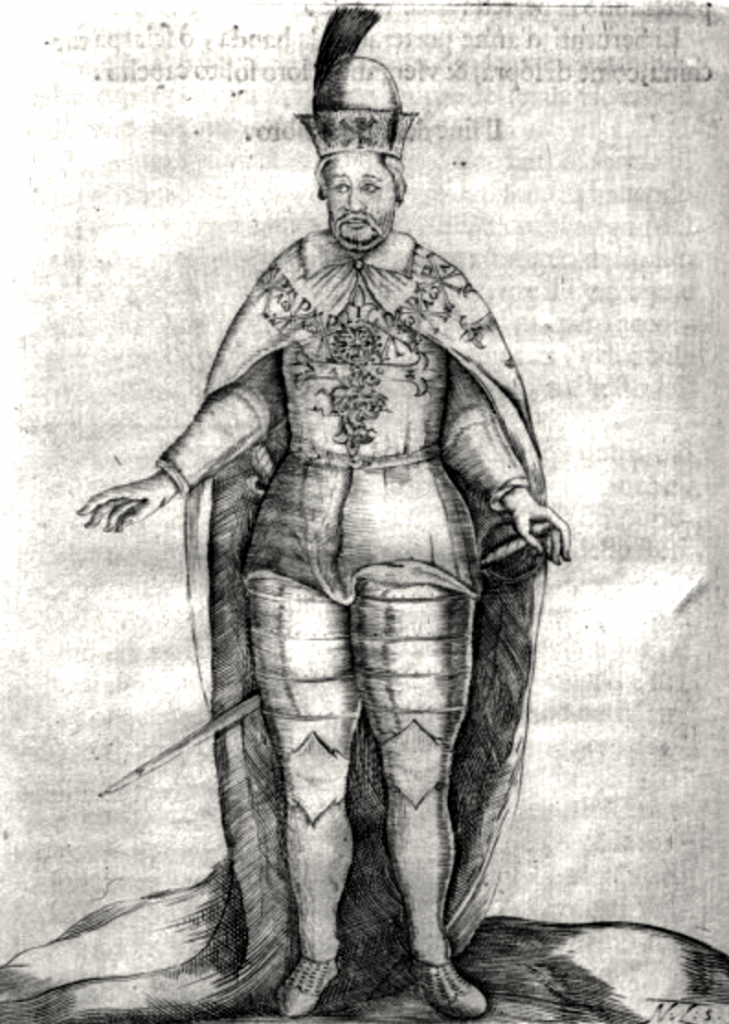
Giovanni Andrea I Angeli wearing the ceremonial crown, robes, and collar of the order

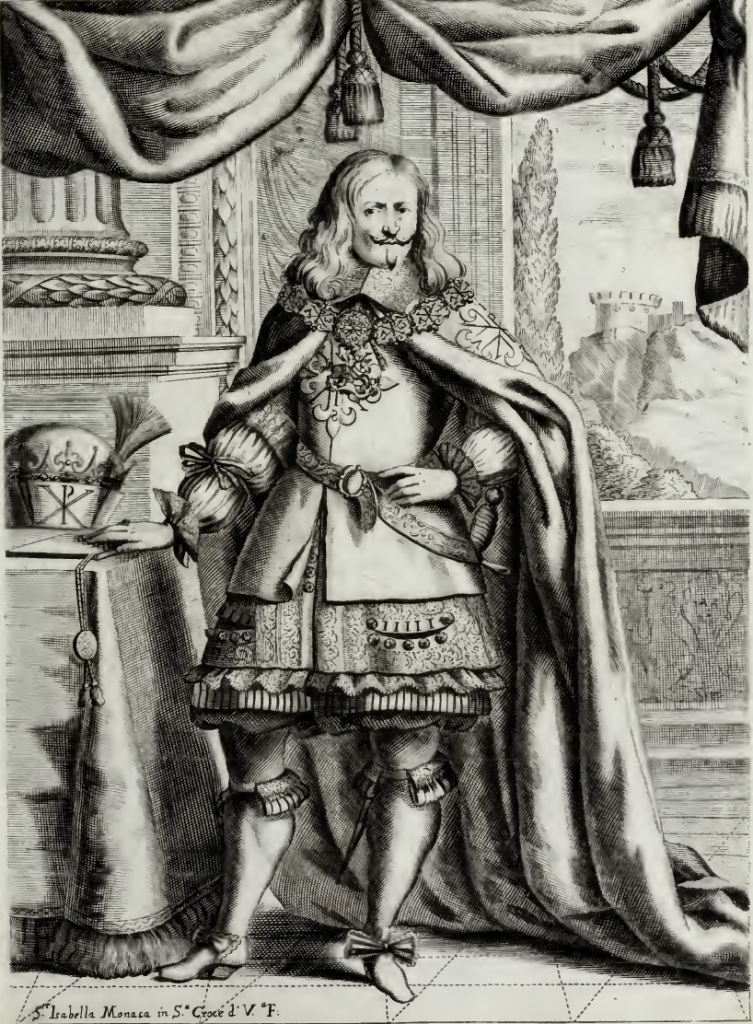
Angelo Maria Angeli wearing the ceremonial robes and collar of the order

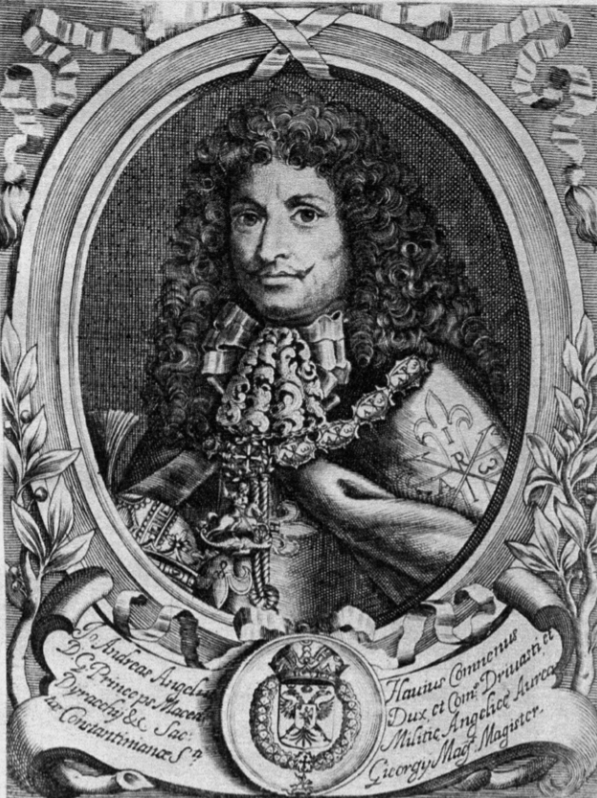
Giovanni Andrea II Angeli wearing the ceremonial robes and collar of the order

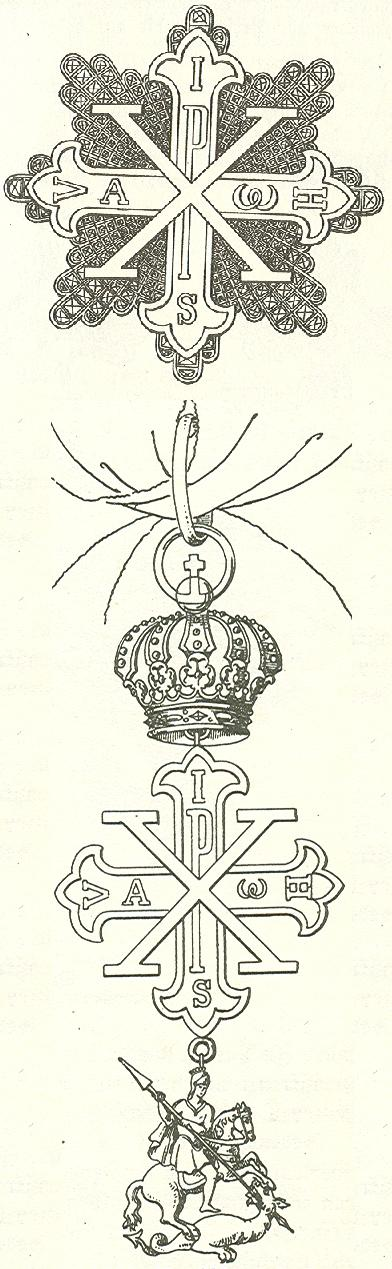
Breast star and Grand Cross

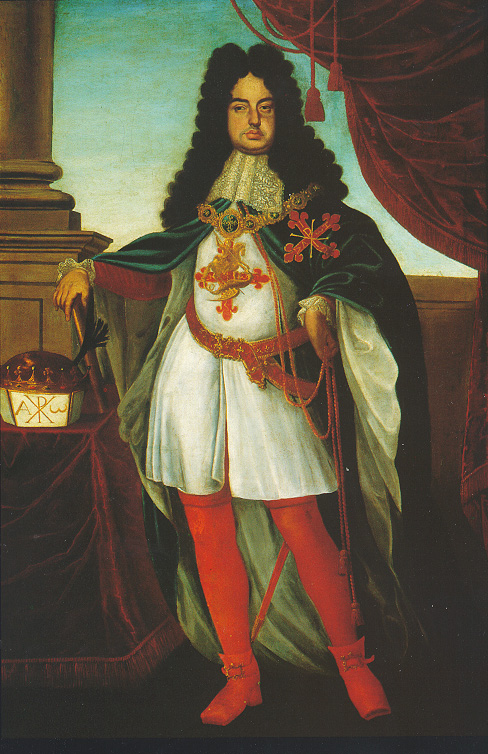
Duke of Parma wearing the ceremonial robes of the order

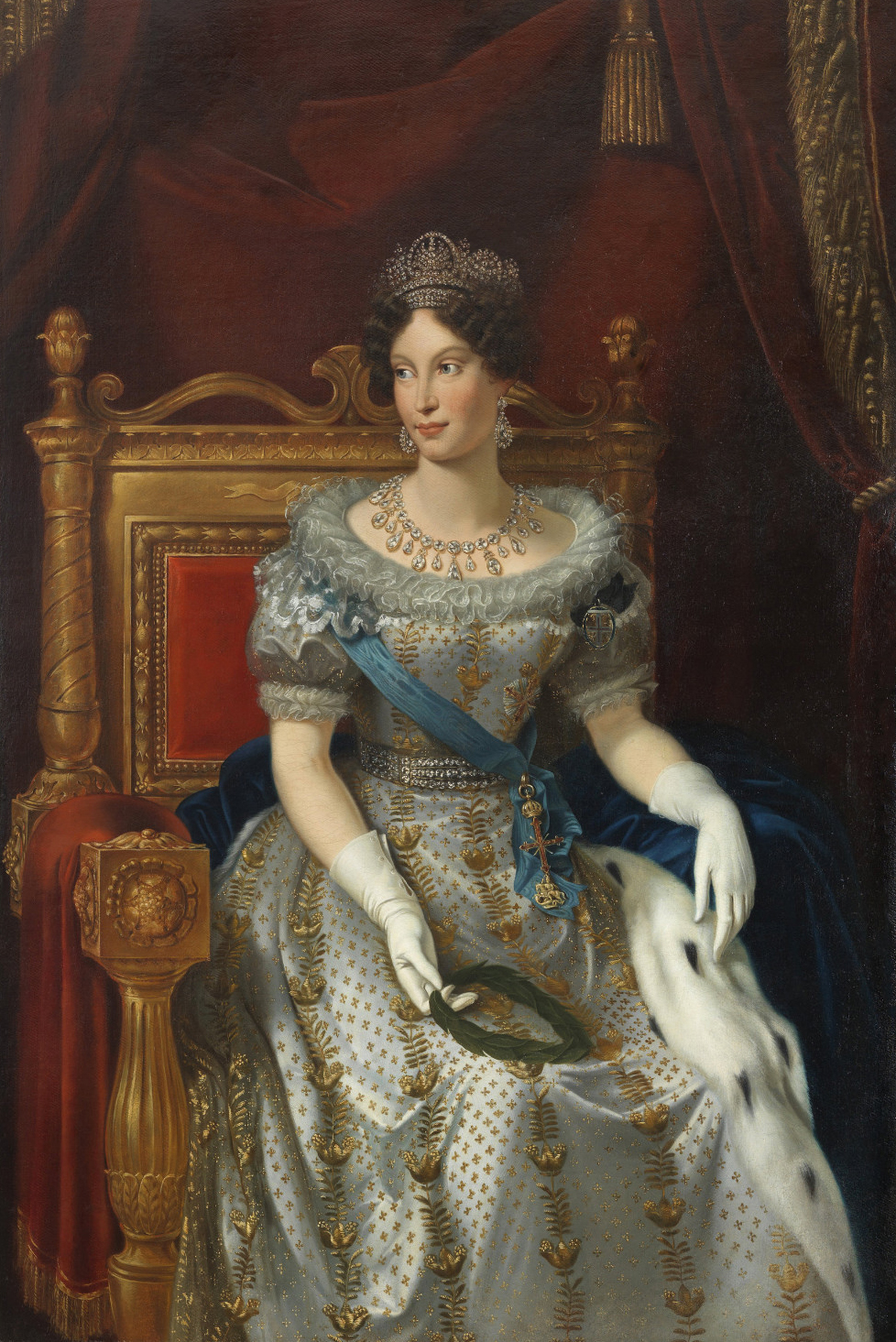
Marie Louise, Duchess of Parma, wearing the sash of the order

== House of Zogu ==
The Regalia for the Zogu Family was created when Zog I of Albania in 1928 self-proclaimed himself King of the Albanians and began his rule. He commissioned a regal ensemble for his coronation, featuring rose-colored breeches, gold spurs, and a gold crown weighing seven and five-eighths pounds. That same year there were tiaras commissioned for Zog I of Albania sisters. They were made for Princess Senije, Princess Myzejen, Princess Ruhije and Princess Maxhide. While Princess Adile and Princess Nafije did not receive any tiaras due to being already married when their brother Zog I of Albania became King. In 1930 the diadem of the Princesses of Albania was created by Töpfert Vienna. It was created for one of Zog I of Albania sisters the princesses but nothing further is known about the jewel. Its whereabouts are unknown today. Shortly after getting engaged then marrying Zog I of Albania. Geraldine of Albania received the Royal Diamond Tiara at the wedding in 1938. Her tiara had 28.05 carats of old European and single-cut diamonds and 4.80 carats of baguette diamonds, the tiara has a floral base relating to her being called "The White Rose of Hungary" and is topped with a diamond ram's head relating to Skanderbeg. In 1939 the House of Zogu was deposed by Victor Emmanuel III of Italy during the Italian invasion of 1939. Victor assumed the Albanian throne. While in their exile King Zog was suffering from stomach cancer and required treatment for which the family had little money. Queen Geraldine was forced to sell most of her regalia. Including the Oak Leave tiara and Floral tiara as well as the jewelry except she kept earrings. In 1961 King Zog died in exile and was succeeded as claimant to the throne and head of the house of Zogu was his only son Leka, Crown Prince of Albania who became self-proclaimed King of the Albanians. In the early 1970s the Queen Susan tiara diadem was commissioned by Leka, Crown Prince of Albania and designed by the Iranian imperial family. The tiara was first worn by Geraldine of Albania at the wedding of her son Leka, Crown Prince of Albania and Susan Cullen-Ward. It was then given to Susan Cullen-Ward when she became queen. After the Passing of Leka, Crown Prince of Albania, Leka, Prince of Albania became the sole heir to the Albanian Crown. On October 8, 2016 Leka, Prince of Albania married Elia, Princess of Albania where she became Crown Princess Elia of the Albanians. She inherited the Tiara that was worn by Susan Cullen-Ward and Geraldine of Albania.

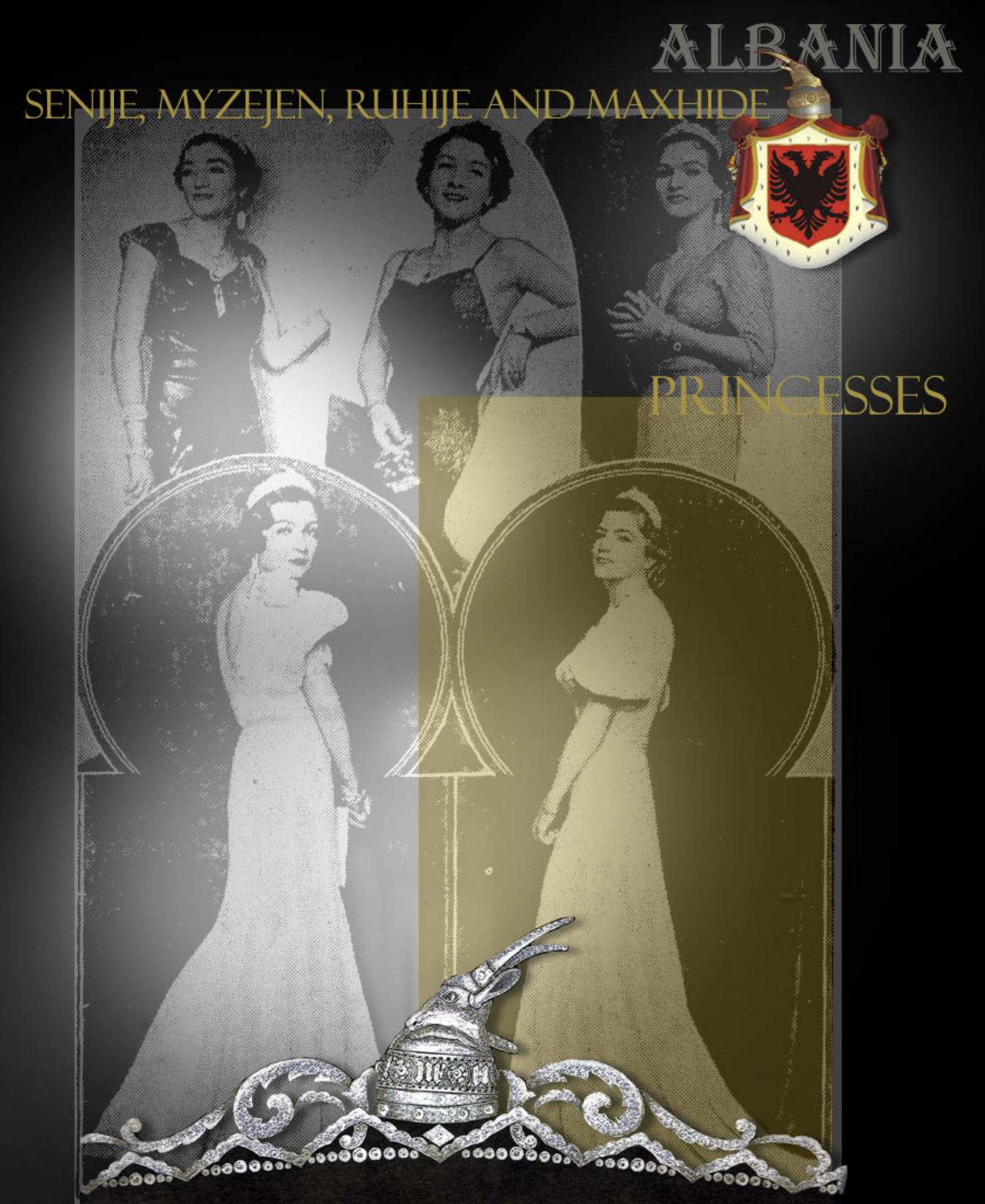
The Lost Diadem of the Princesses of Albania

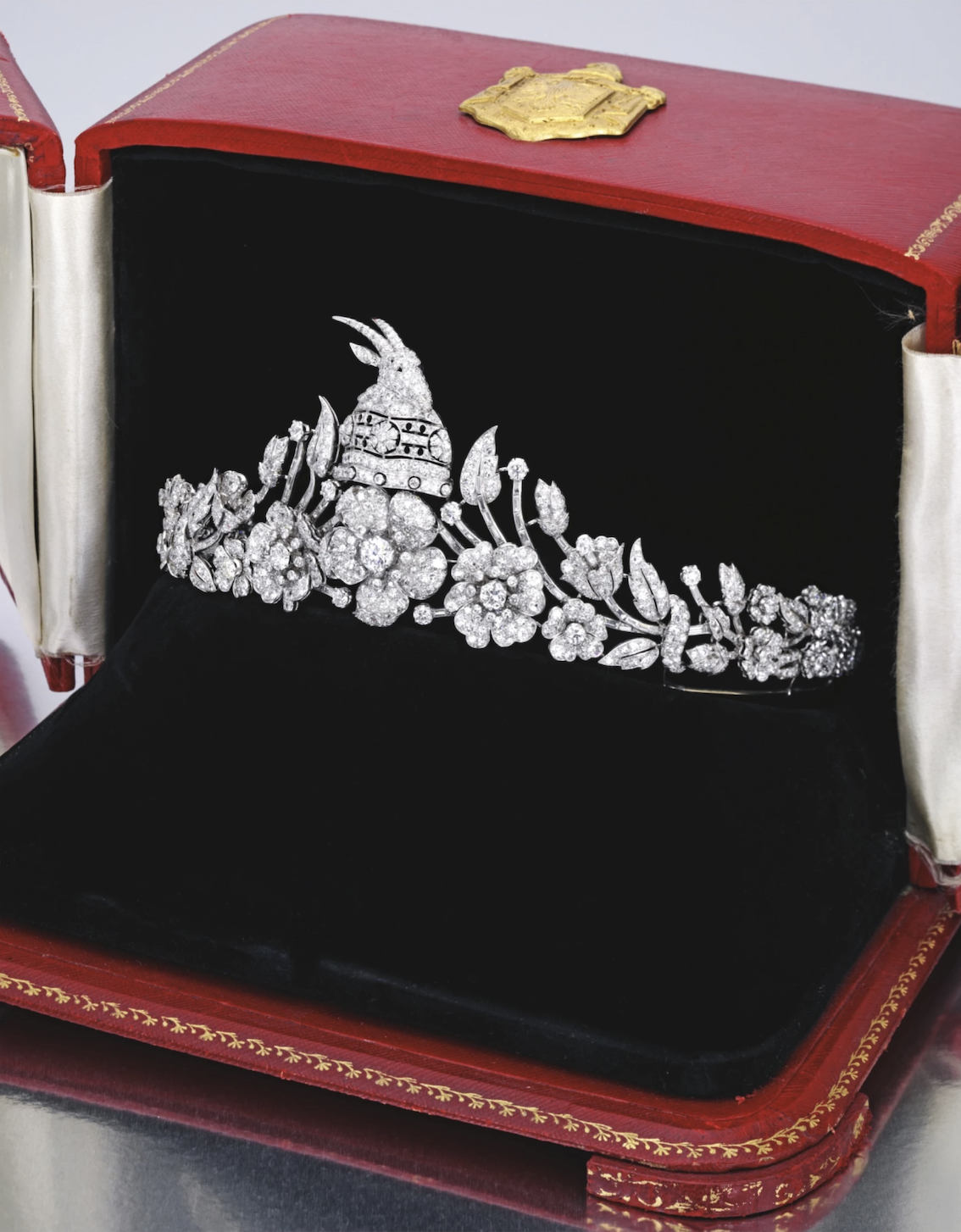
Geraldines Royal Tiara

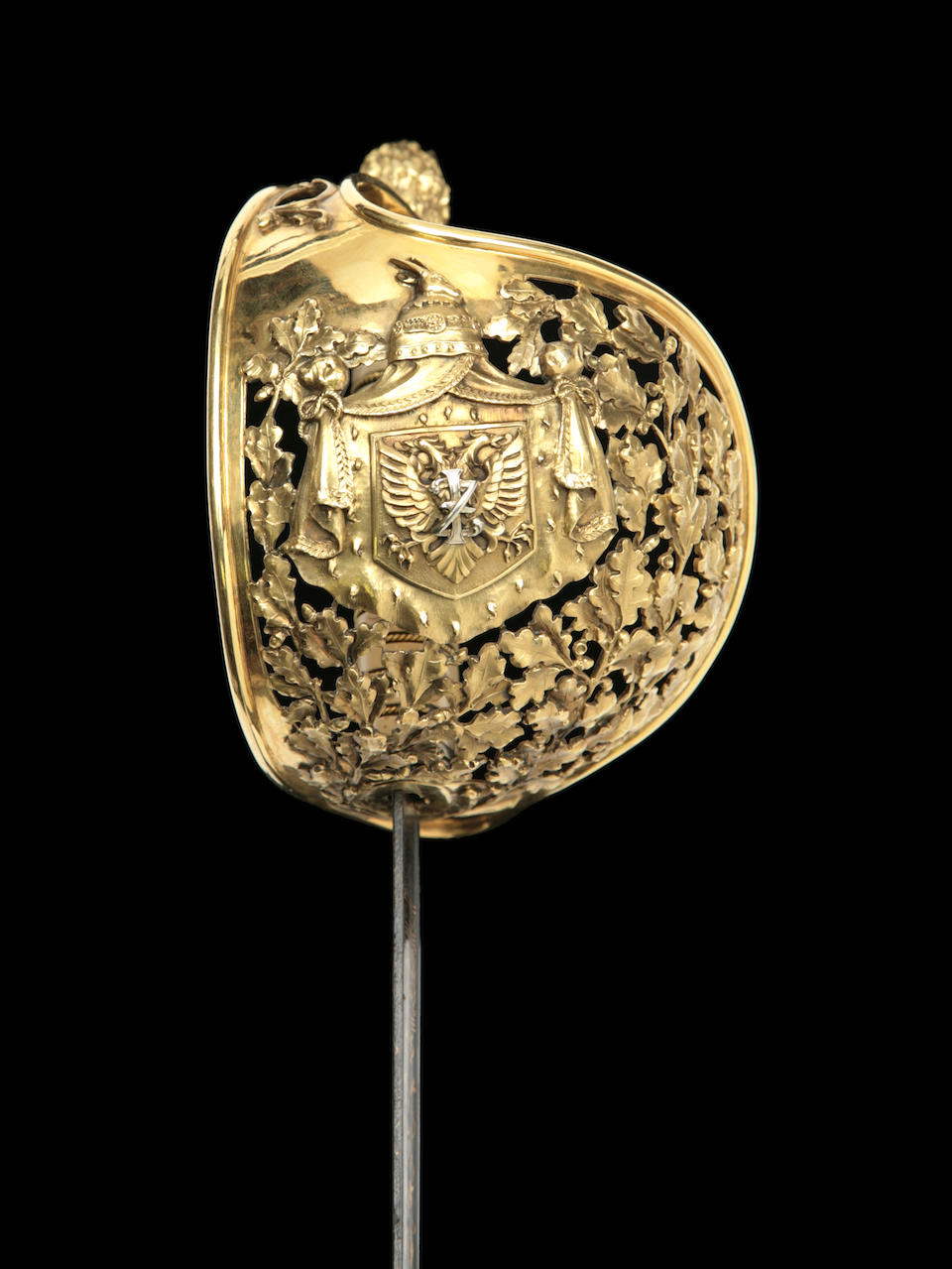
Zog I of Albania sword used at his wedding

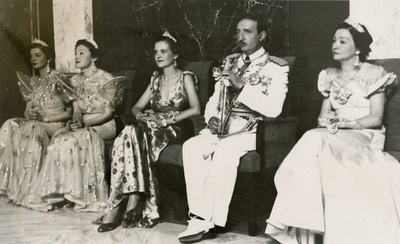
Geraldine and the Princesses wearing the Oak leave Tiaras

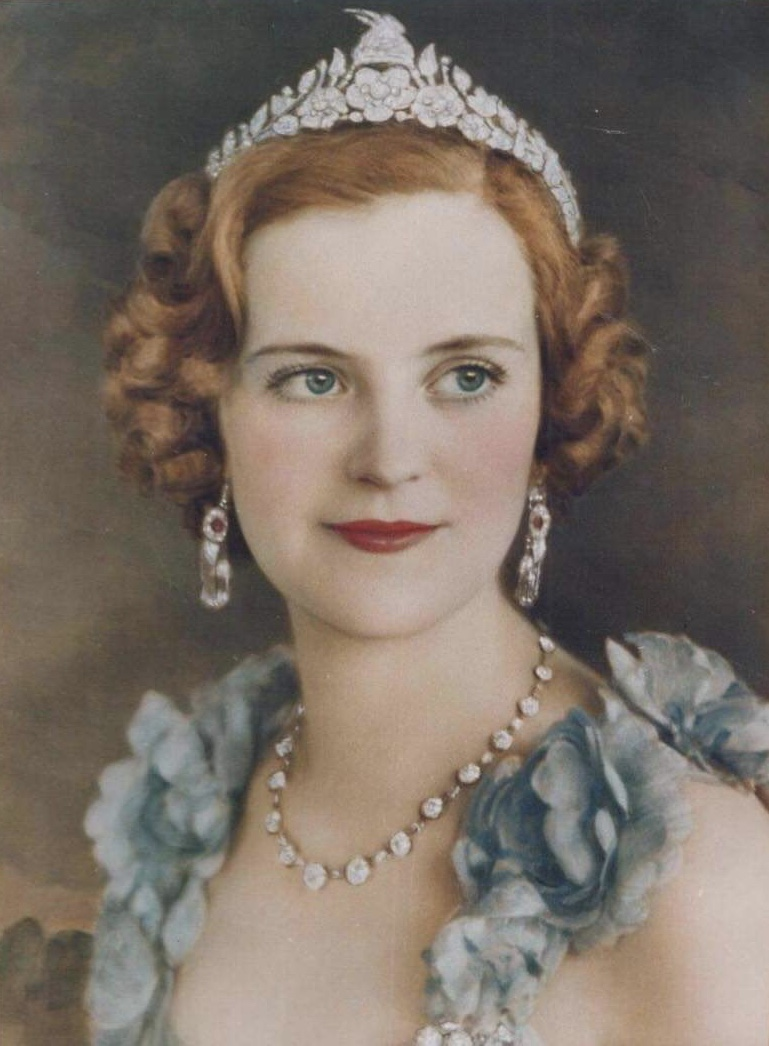
Geraldine of Albania wearing the Royal Floral Tiara

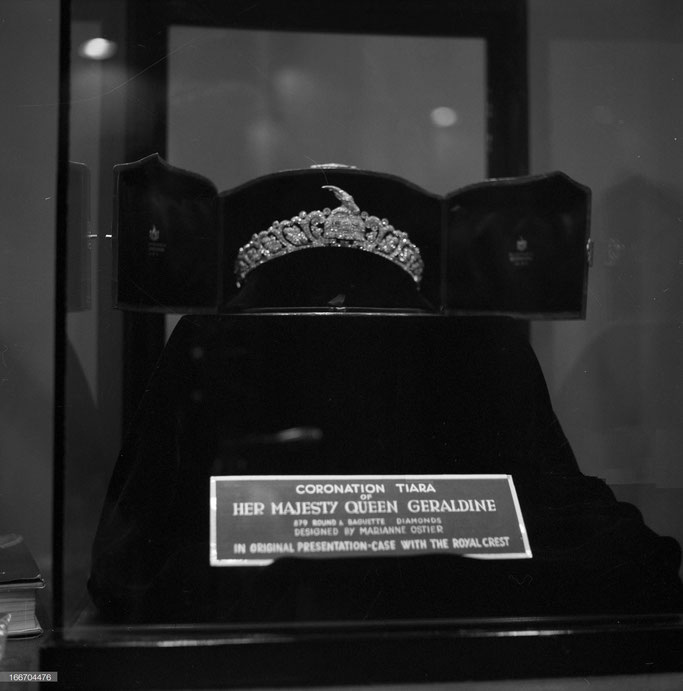
The Oak leave Coronation Tiara of Queen Geraldine

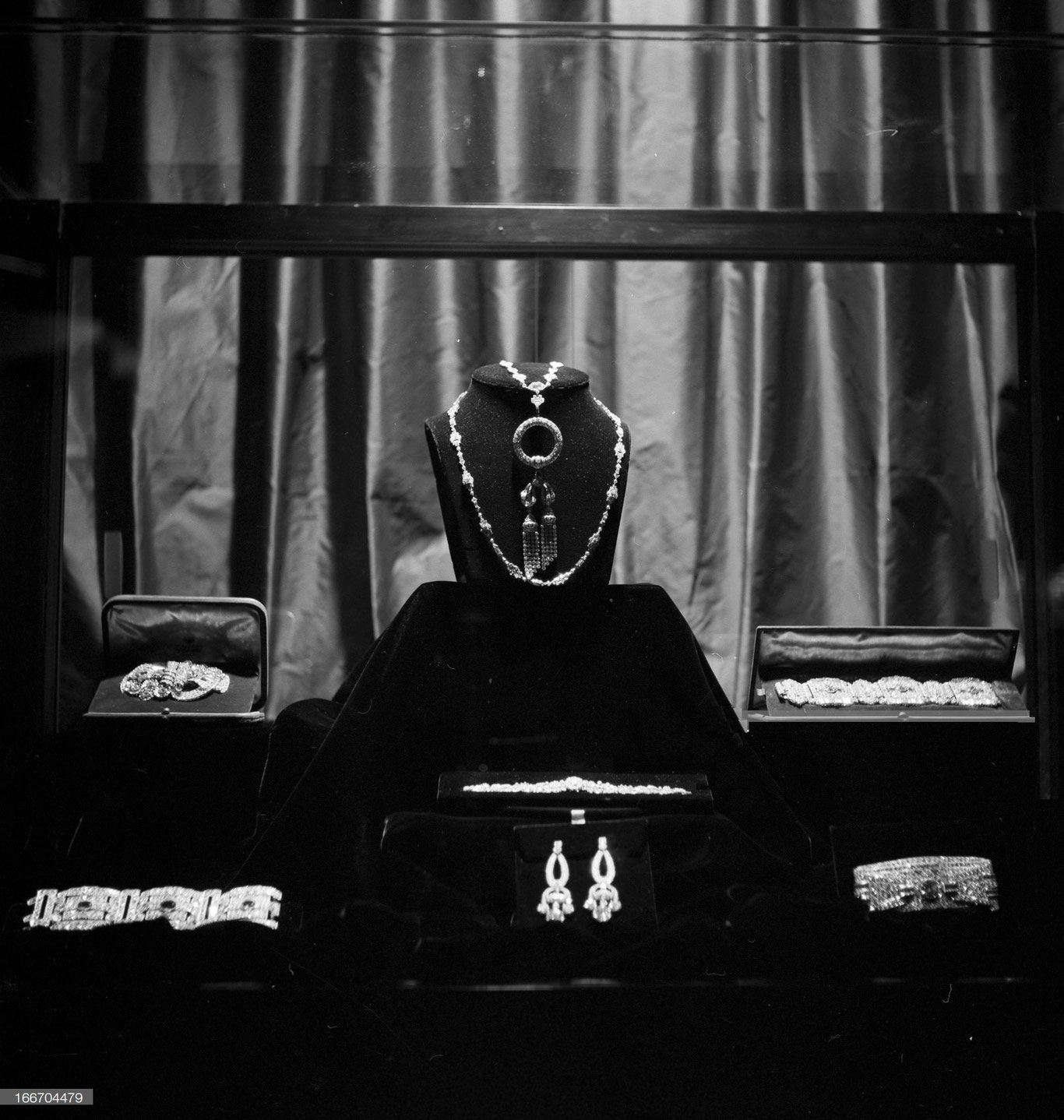
The Regalia sold by Geraldine

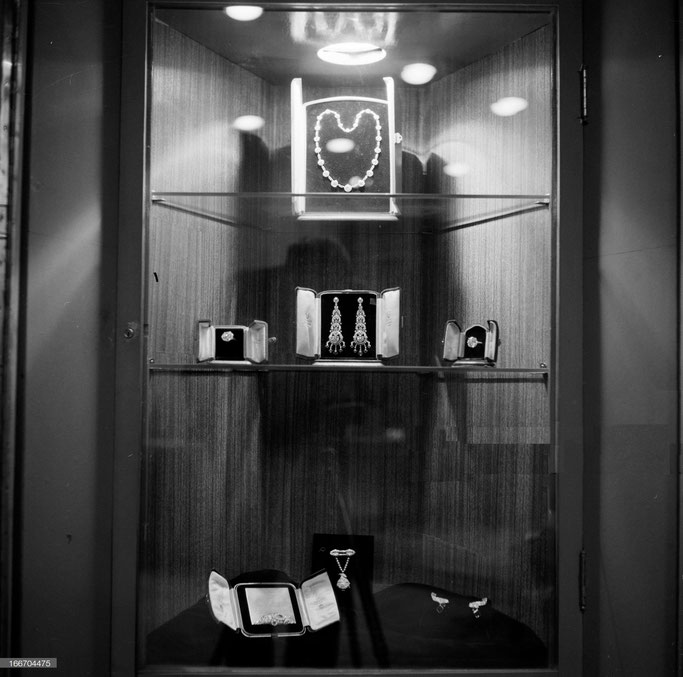
The Regalia sold by Geraldine

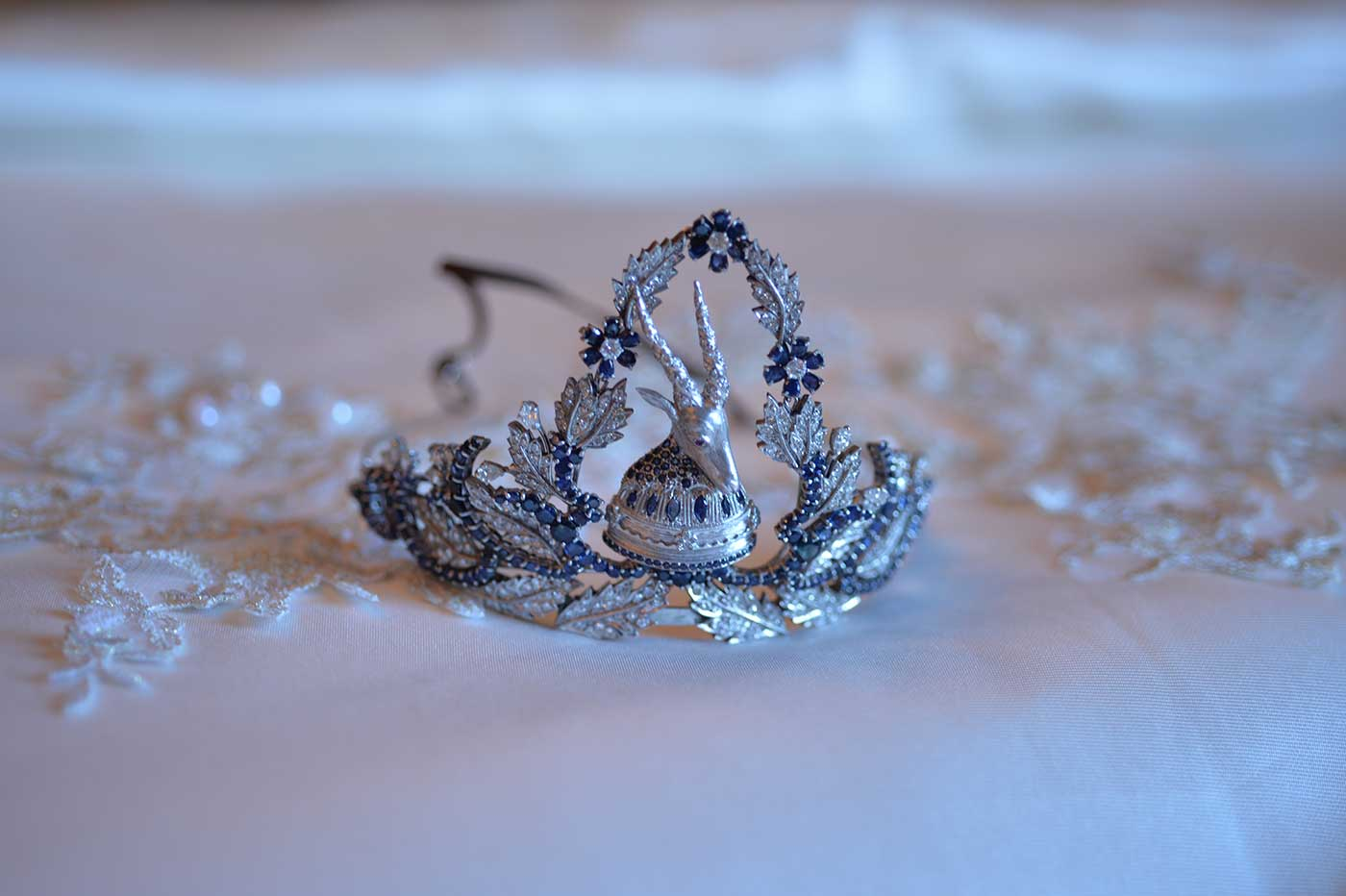
The Tiara worn by Queen Geraldine,Queen Susan and currently Elia, Princess of Albania

== See also ==
- History of Albania
- List of Albanian monarchs
- Kastrioti family
- Engjëlli family
- Zogu family

== Bibliography ==
- Gjergji, Andromaqi (2004). Albanian Costumes Through the Centuries Origin, Types, Evolution. Acad. of Sciences of Albania, Inst. of Folc Culture. ISBN 978-9-9943-6144-1.
