= 1997 Albanian monarchy referendum =

- 29 June 1997
- Which form of government are you in favor of

Results
Choice	Votes	%
Republic	904,359	66.75%
Monarchy	450,478	33.25%
Valid votes	1,354,837	95.20%
Invalid or blank votes	68,372	4.80%
Total votes	1,423,209	100.00%
Registered voters/turnout	1,986,550	71.64%

A referendum on restoring the monarchy was held in Albania on 29 June 1997 alongside parliamentary elections. The proposal was rejected by 66.7% of voters. However, former Crown Prince Leka claimed that 65.7% voted in favour.

== Results ==
Choice	Votes	%
For	450,478	33.25
Against	904,359	66.75
Total	1,354,837	100.00
Valid votes	1,354,837	95.20
Invalid/blank votes	68,372	4.80
Total votes	1,423,209	100.00
Registered voters/turnout	1,986,550	71.64
Source: Direct Democracy

== Reactions ==
The House of Zogu never accepted the official result of the referendum. After the publication of the result by the Central Election Commission of Albania, during the 1997 rebellion in Albania, Leka returned again, this time being greeted by 2,000 supporters.

After a recount it was announced that the restoration was rejected by approximately two-thirds of those voting. The former Crown Prince questioned the independence of the election. Police intervened, gunfire broke out, one person was killed, and Leka fled.

On 30 November 2011, the former crown prince died, his son then succeeded him as pretender to the defunct throne. That month, Prime Minister Sali Berisha questioned whether there was vote manipulation in the referendum, stating that "The referendum was held under the flares of a communist rebellion and cannot be considered a closed issue."
