= Louis-Hippolyte Boileau =

French architect

Louis-Hippolyte Boileau (French pronunciation: [lwi ipolit bwalo]; 1878–1948) was a French architect.

Grandson of Louis-Auguste Boileau (1812–1896) and son of Louis-Charles Boileau (1837–1914, architect of the Hôtel Lutetia), Louis-Hippolyte studied at the École nationale supérieure des Beaux-Arts in Paris under Gaston Redon. He is best known for his Art Deco.

== Works ==
- annex to the Le Bon Marché department store, Paris, 1920s
- war monument, Longwy, 1925
- Pomone Pavilion for Bon Marché, for the Exposition Internationale des Arts Décoratifs et Industriels Modernes, Paris, 1925
- the Pagode de Vincennes, for the Paris Colonial Exposition, 1931, now on the shore of the Lac Daumesnil in Paris
- The Palais de l'Afrique Equatoriale Française at the Vincennes Colonial Exposition of 1931, along with Léon Carrière.
- the new Palais de Chaillot at the Trocadéro, for the Exposition Internationale des Arts et Techniques dans la Vie Moderne (1937), with fellow architects Jacques Carlu and Léon Azéma
- additions to the Expositions Buildings at the Porte de Versailles, with Léon Azéma, 1937
- Hotel Plaza in Biarritz with Paul Perrotte, 1928
- Hôtel de Ville, Biarritz, 1929
