= Skënder Zogu =

Albanian author (born 1933)

- Born: 3 June 1933 (age 93); Davos, Switzerland
- Occupation: Author
- Known for: Second in line of succession to the former Albanian throne
- Notable work: Një jetë në shërbim të kombit shqiptar-kujtime mërgimi
- Spouse: Jacqueline Cosme (m. 1962; died 2001)
- Children: Virginie Zogu
- Parent(s): Prince Xhelal Zogu; Faika Minxhalliu
- Relatives: Zog I of Albania (uncle); Leka, Crown Prince of Albania (first cousin once removed)

Skënder Zogu (born 3 June 1933) is an Albanian author and member of the House of Zogu. He is the son of Prince Xhelal Zogu, half-brother of King Zog.

== Biography ==
Skënder (Alexander) Zogu born in Prince Xhelal Zogu (half-brother of Zog I of Albania) and Faika Minxhalliu on 3 June 1933 in Davos, Switzerland. He studied at the Huddersfield College of Technology, which later became the University of Huddersfield. During his time at university, he was the vice president and then president of the Student Union. After graduating with a degree in Textile and Color Chemistry, Zogu worker for a period of time for Francolor. He went on to work as a textile sales manager at KVK Danemark.

On 9 April 1961, Zogu was present when Zog I of Albania died while in exile at Hôpital Foch in Suresnes, Hauts-de-Seine, France. Zogu organized the funeral, which was held two days later. Zogu recounts his uncle dying in a memoir released in 2017. The book, which has a translated title of A life in the service of the Albanian nation - memories of exile, was given a positive review by writer Roland Qafoku. Qafoku wrote, "The book has an unprecedented gallery of characters. With the good, the bad, the positive and the negative, Skender Zogu in fact, in this book, has brought out their best sides... The story of the royal family and the Zog kingdom itself would be incomplete without this book!" Sprint News stated the book was "A brilliant example of approaching the truth... Skender Zogu writes with simplicity and truth about the experiences of the time." The book received positive reviews from other sources as well. The book was released in English in 2020.

On 10 November 1962, Zogu married to French national Jacqueline Cosme until her death in 2001. Together they had a daughter, Virginie Alexandra Geraldine Zogu, born 25 January 1963 in Compiègne, France. Virginie married Mr. Raphaël de Urresti, who was born 1959.

From 1980 until 1995 Zogu was the head of the Albanian Royal Court in exile Press Office. In 1993, he returned to Albania after living in exile for 54 years.

On 16 November 2012, Zogu joined Ambassador Ylljet Aliçka to repatriate the remains of Zog I from France to Albania, where he was placed in the royal family mausoleum.

Zogu is known for protecting the legacy of the royal family members. In 2017, Zogu criticized Albanian politician Alfred Peza who had written disparaging comments about the royal family. Zogu stated Peza "was a man without culture and without character" who had no chance of meeting the royal family or entering the palace. In 2018, he defended the former king against statements Zog I did not know how to write in Albanian.

Zogu retired in 1999. As of 2019, he lives in Chantilly, France. He is active in the Legality Movement Party, a conservative monarchist party in Albania.

== Bibliography ==
- Zogu, Skender. Një jetë në shërbim të kombit shqiptar-kujtime mërgimi (translated: A life in the service of the Albanian nation - memories of exile).

== Filmography ==
Year	Title	Role	Ref.
2016	Channel One: Debati ne Channel One	Self	

== Dynastic honours ==
- (Albanian Kingdom (1928–1939)) House of Zogu: Order of Skanderbeg (awarded by King Leka I)
- (Albanian Kingdom (1928–1939)) House of Zogu: Order of Fidelity (awarded by Leka, Crown Prince of Albania)

== Ancestry ==
Ancestors of Skënder Zogu

8. Xhelal Pasha Zogolli
4. Xhemal Pasha Zogu
9. Ruhije Alltuni
2. Prince Xhelal Zogu
5. Melek Zogu
1. Skënder Zogu
3. Faika Minxhalliu
