= Elia Zaharia =

Albanian actress and singer (born 1983)

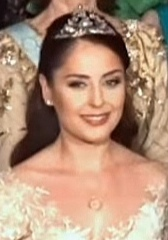
- Zaharia in 2016
- Born: 8 February 1983 (age 43); Tirana, Albania
- Occupations: Actress, singer
- Spouse: Leka, Prince of Albania (m. 2016; div. 2024)
- Children: Princess Geraldine
- Parents: Gjergj Polikron Zaharia (father); Yllka Mujo (mother)
- Family: Zogu (during marriage)

Elia Zaharia (born 8 February 1983), formerly Princess Elia of Albania, is an Albanian actress, former singer, and the ex-wife of Leka, Prince of Albania.

== Early life and education ==
She was born on 8 February 1983 in Tirana, Albania. She is the daughter of Gjergj Polikron Zaharia (born 1952) and Yllka Mujo (born 1954), who are both actors. Her father is from Përmet while her mother's family come from Podgorica, Montenegro. They moved to Shkodër, a city in northern Albania, later during the monarchist period. She has a younger brother, Amos Muji Zaharia. Both her mother and brother are famous artists in Albania, her mother being a well-known actress, and her brother an actor and film director.

In 2002, she graduated from the National Art School Jordan Misja in Tirana in art and scenography and later moved to Paris for her university studies, where she met Prince Leka. In 2005, she graduated from the National Conservatory of Bordeaux in art drama. She then attended a private French drama school in Paris, Cours Florent, and then continued her studies in scenic acting at the Paris 8 University, graduating in 2010.

In addition to her native Albanian, she is fluent in French, English, and Italian.

== Career ==
Elia Zaharia has performed in several plays at the National theatre including:

- 2011: The Crucible by Arthur Miller, Albanian National Theater
- 2011: Bitter Love by Carlo Bruni, Albanian National Theater
- 2012: Forget Love by Erion Kame, Albanian National Comedy Theatre
- 2013: Midsummer Night's Dream by William Shakespeare, Albanian National Theater
- 2014: The Sunshine Boys by Neil Simon, Albanian National Comedy Theater
- 2016: Three Sisters by Anton Chekhov, Albanian National Theater

Zaharia also acted in movies and performed as a singer. In 2002, she had the main role in 'Lule te kuqe, lule te zeza', while in 2008 she acted in the movie Honeymoon by Goran Paskaljević.

From 1999 until 2002, Elia took part in a musical band called "Spirit Voice".

In 2016 and 2018, Elia co-hosted Kënga Magjike, a major musical event in Albania, together with Ardit Gjebrea.

== Personal life ==
In Paris she met Prince Leka of Albania and in May 2010 they got engaged. Since then she has accompanied the Prince on all his visits and meetings with members of other royal families. She is also head of the Queen Geraldine Foundation, a non-profit founded by the Royal Court. According to its website, the "foundation aims to be close to the Albanian families who need help [and to] children who need care."

On 27 March 2016, it was announced by Prince Skënder Zogu (b. 1933), a member of the Albanian Royal Family, that the couple would get married on 8 October 2016 in the Royal Palace in Tirana. The ceremony was a non-official ceremony, held in Tirana in the Royal Palace, with more than 300 members of other European noble and royal families attending. The couple's civil marriage was officiated by the Mayor of Tirana Erion Veliaj.

Among the members of the royal families, who attended the wedding were: Queen Sofía of Spain, Empress Farah of Iran, Prince and Princess Michael of Kent, Crown Prince Alexander and Crown Princess Katherine of Yugoslavia, Prince Guillaume and Princess Sibilla of Luxembourg, Princess Léa of Belgium, Grand Duchess Maria Vladimirovna of Russia and other members from the royal families of Italy, Liechtenstein, Romania, Greece, Georgia, Montenegro, Morocco and members of other noble families. Heads of state of Albania also attended the ceremony.

She gave birth to a daughter, Princess Geraldine, on 22 October 2020 at Queen Geraldine Maternity Hospital in Tirana, on the 18th death anniversary of Queen Geraldine, after whom she was also named. In January 2024, Princess Elia and Prince Leka both confirmed that they were getting a divorce. They divorced on 25 April 2024.

== Honours ==
- Knight Grand Cross of the Order of Fidelity.

== See also ==
- House of Zogu
- National Theatre of Albania
