= Hôtel de Ville, Biarritz =

Town hall in Biarritz, France

Hôtel de Ville
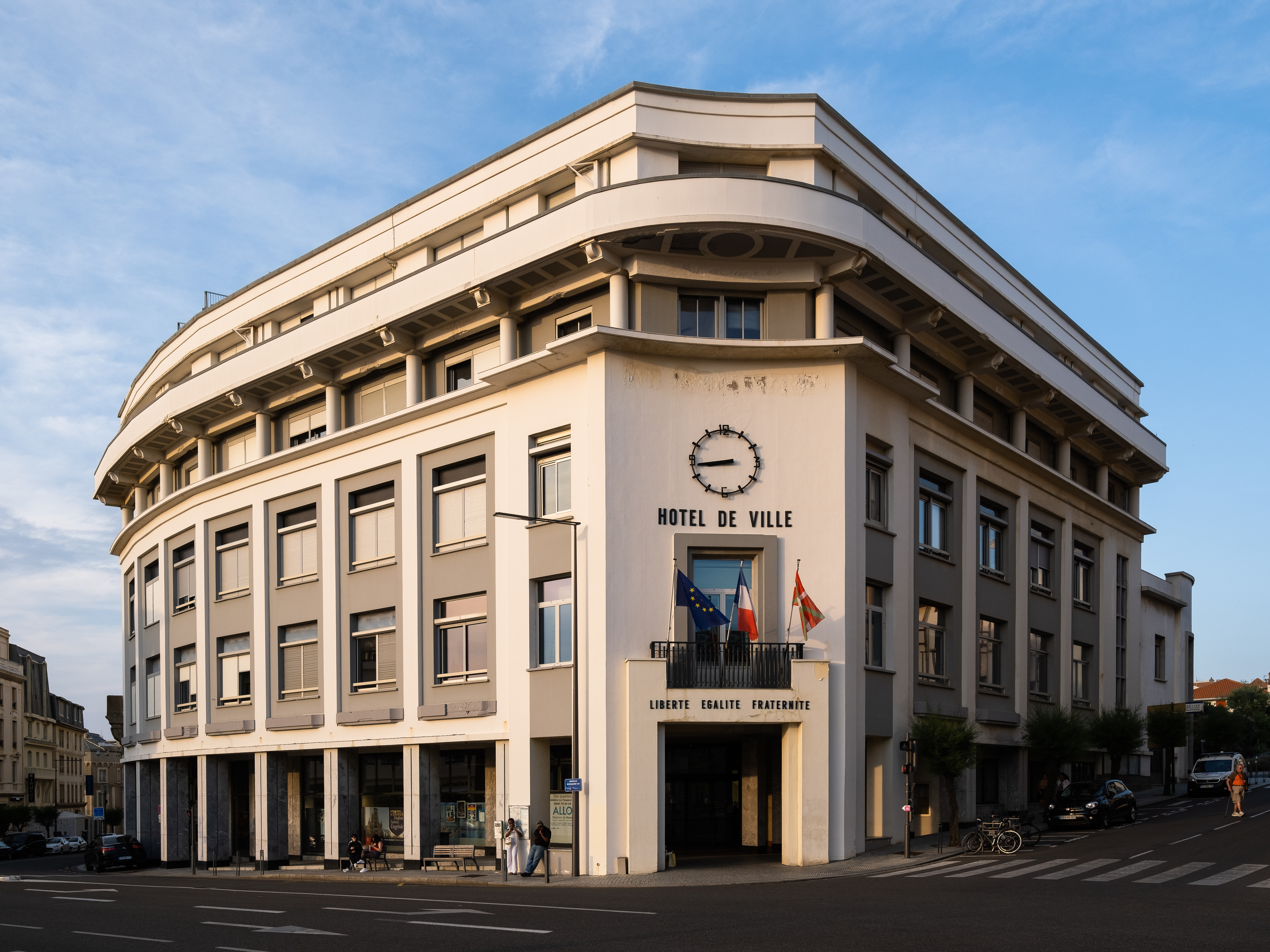
- The main frontage of the Hôtel de Ville in June 2025
- Interactive map of the Hôtel de Ville area

General information
- Type: City hall
- Architectural style: Art Deco style
- Location: Biarritz, France
- Coordinates: 43.4831°N 1.5584°W
- Completed: 1929

Design and construction
- Architects: Louis-Hippolyte Boileau and Paul Perrotte

The Hôtel de Ville (French pronunciation: [otɛl də vil], City Hall) is a municipal building in Biarritz, Pyrénées-Atlantiques, in southwest France, standing on Avenue Édouard VII.

== History ==
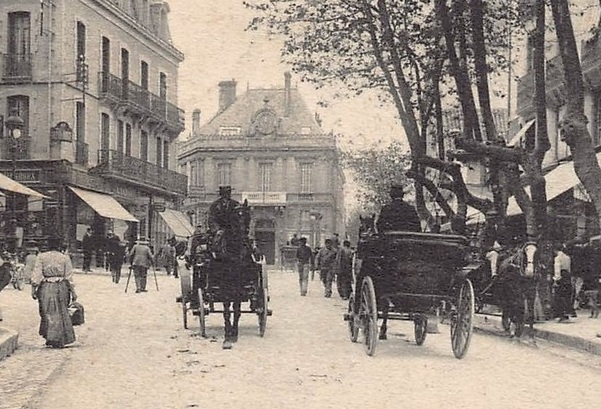
The first town hall

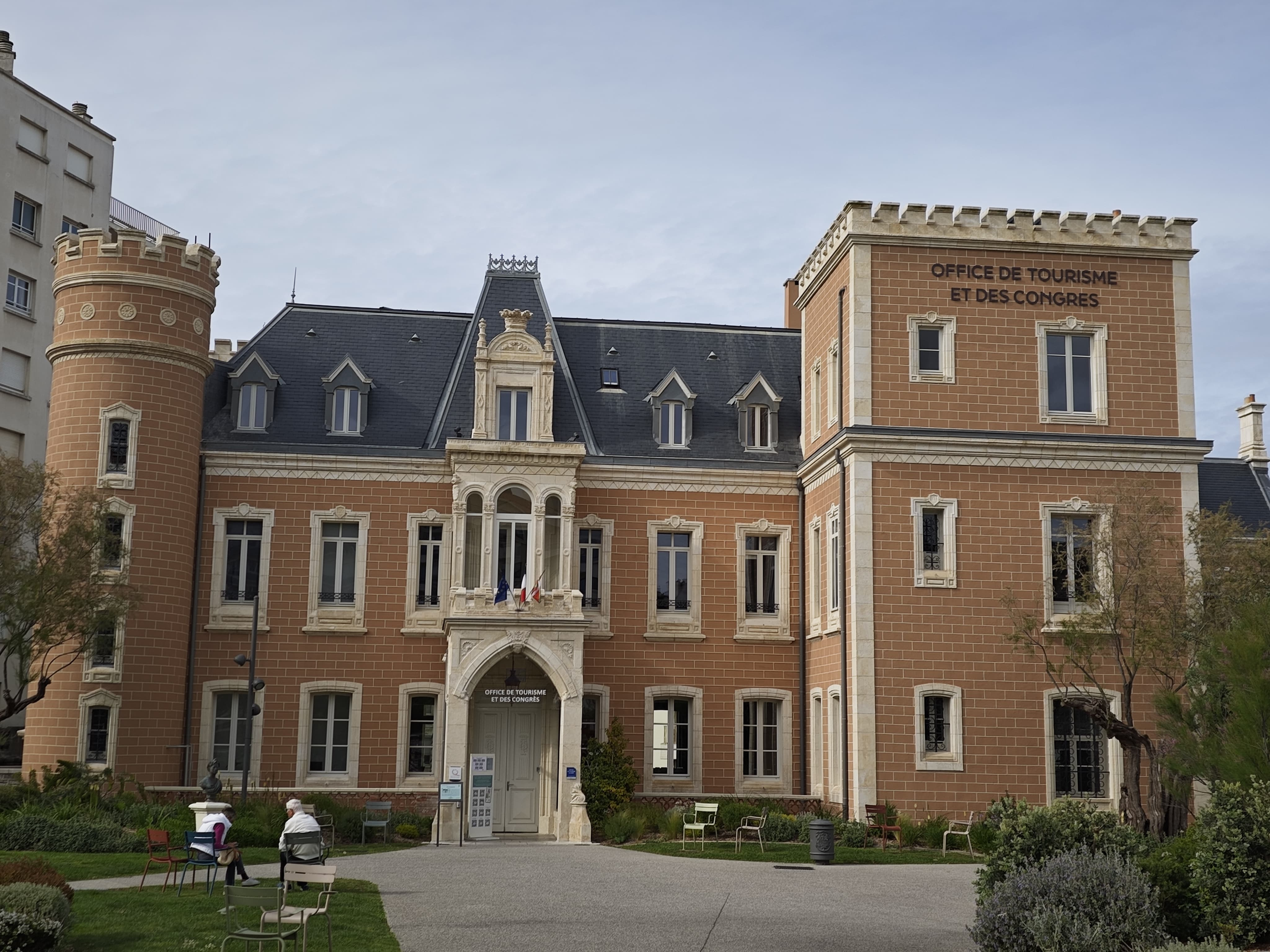
The Villa Javalquinto

Following the French Revolution, the town council initially met in the house of the mayor at the time. This arrangement continued until the mid-1830s, when the council led by the mayor, Louis Loupy, decided to establish a dedicated town hall. The site they selected, on Place de la Mairie (now Place Georges Clemenceau), was occupied by the Chapel of Notre-Dame de Bon Secours which, although dilapidated, was used as guardhouse in the First Carlist War. The new building was designed in the neoclassical style, built in ashlar stone and was completed in August 1838.

The design involved a symmetrical main frontage of three bays facing down the hill. The central bay featured a round-headed doorway on the ground floor, a French door with a balcony on the first floor and a clock above. The outer bays were fenestrated by casement windows on both floors. After the building was no longer required for municipal use, it was demolished to make way for a modern development, which later accommodated Banque Michel Inchauspé.

In the early 1920s, after the first town hall became cramped, the council led by the mayor, Joseph Petit, decided to acquire a more substantial building. The building they selected was the Villa Javalquinto on Place d'Ixelles. The building had been commissioned, with no expense spared, by Mariano Téllez-Girón, 12th Duke of Osuna and 15th Duke of the Infantado. It had been designed in the Gothic Revival style, built in red brick with stone finishings and had been completed in around 1870.

The design involved an asymmetrical main frontage of ten bays facing onto Place d'Ixelles. The left-hand bay was formed by a circular five-stage castellated tower, while the last two bays, which were projected forward, were formed by a square-shaped, three-stage castellated tower. The central bay featured a castellated porch with an arched entrance on the ground floor, a Venetian window on the first floor and a dormer window at attic level. The other bays were fenestrated by casement windows on the first two floors and by dormer windows at attic level.

Following the duke's death in 1882, the estate subsequently passed to his heir, Pedro de Àlcantara Téllez-Girón y Fernández de Santillán, 13th Duke of Osuna. However, when he died in 1900, the family was in signiicant debt. The Infantado title had already passed to the Arteaga y Lazcano family and they subsequently acquired the house. In February 1925, Joaquín de Arteaga y Echagüe Silva y Méndez de Vigo, 17th Duke of the Infantado agreed to sell the building to the town council for FFr1.5 million. When the building was no longer required for municipal use, it became the home of the Office de Tourisme et des Congrès (Office of Tourism and Conventions).

In the early 1950s, following significant population growth, the council led by the mayor, Guy Petit, decided to establish a modern town hall. The building they selected was the former Le Bon Marché shop on Avenue Édouard VII. The building had been designed by Louis-Hippolyte Boileau and Paul Perrotte in the Art Deco style, built in concrete and glass and had been completed in 1929.

The design involved a canted main frontage on the corner of Avenue Édouard VII and Avenue Joseph Petit. There was a large square-headed opening on the ground floor, a French door with a balcony on the first floor and a clock at second floor level. There was a cornice above the second floor, recessed windows on the third floor and prominent eaves above the third floor. The side elevations were arcaded on the ground floor and fenestrated by casement windows on the upper floors. Faced with considerable competition during the Great Depression, the shop closed in 1933 and was subsequently acquired by the council. It was converted for municipal use to a design by Fraysse, Huguenin, Vanel, and Giraudel in 1954.

In October 1975, Leka, Crown Prince of Albania married a teacher, Susan Cullen-Ward, in the building.
