= Presidential Palace, Tirana =

Coordinates: 41°18′41″N 19°50′0″E

Presidential Palace
- Pallati Presidencial
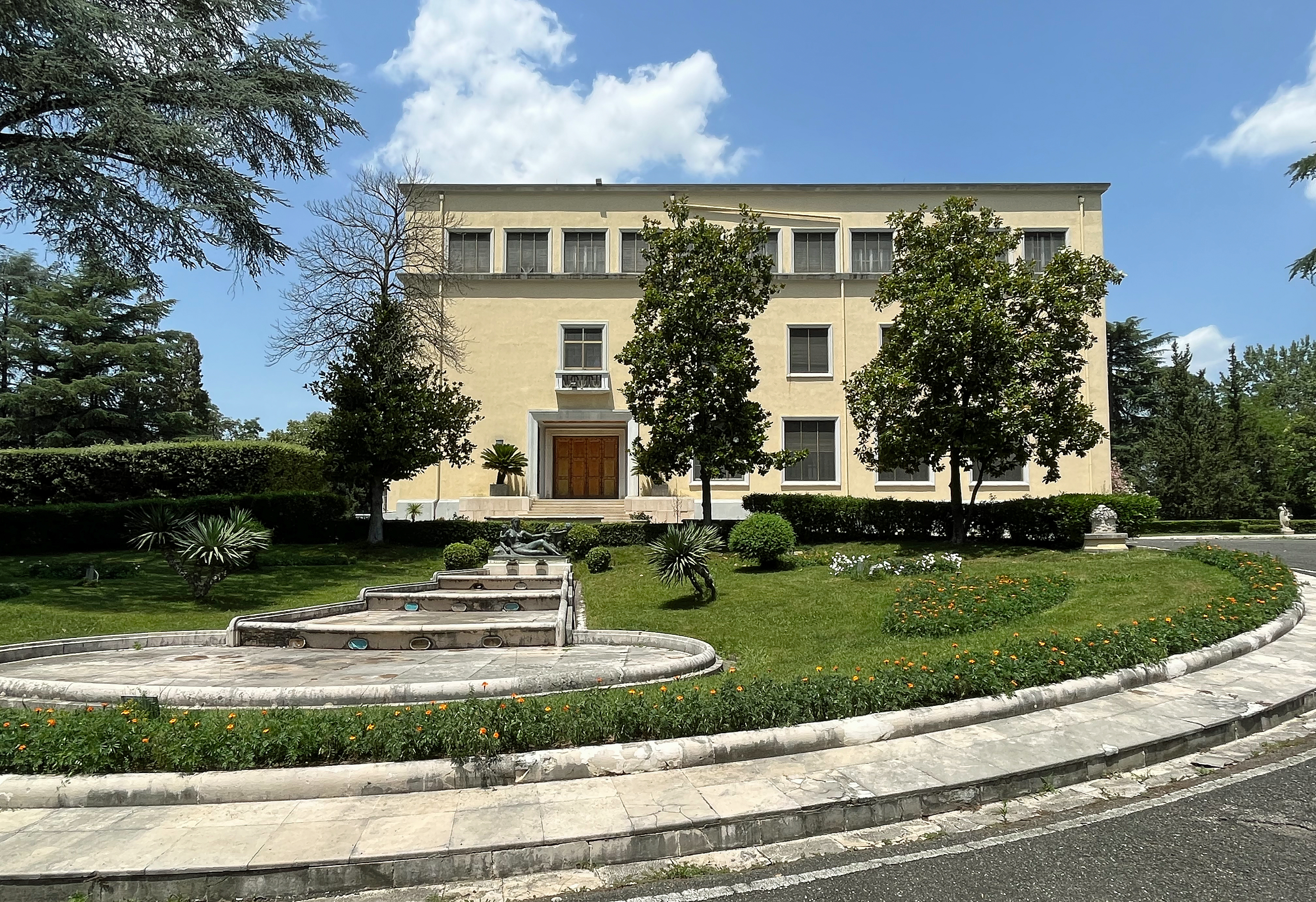
- The Presidential Palace
- Alternative names: Pallati i Brigadave

General information
- Type: Palace
- Architectural style: Monumental Rationalism
- Location: Tirana, Albania, Rruga e Elbasanit 58, Tirana 1019
- Construction started: 1936
- Completed: 1941; 85 years ago
- Client: HM King Zog I of the Albanians. HM Queen Géraldine of the Albanians.
- Owner: Government of Albania

Technical details
- Floor count: 3

Design and construction
- Architect: Gherardo Bosio

The Presidential Palace (Albanian: Pallati Presidencial), formerly the Royal Palace (Albanian: Pallati mbretëror) and popularly known as the Palace of Brigades (Albanian: Pallati i Brigadave), is the official residence of the president of Albania. The palace was commissioned by King Zog I of the Albanians to serve as his main official residence.

In 1945, it ceased to serve as a royal residence because the monarchy was replaced by a Communist-ruled government. Since 1946, it has been used by the Government of Albania for holding official ceremonies and state receptions. In 2013, the palace became an official residence once again, when President Bujar Nishani and his family moved into a reconstructed villa inside the grounds of the palace.

Architecturally, the palace belongs to a rationalism style. It is unique in its genre, not only in the country but in the wider sphere of fascist architecture, including in Italy itself. Its bas-reliefs were covered with drapes in the 1970s during the cultural revolution, but not destroyed. Nevertheless, the palace as a whole is in dire need of restoration. A description of the then new (and unfinished) Royal Palace appeared in the issue of Life dated 22 May 1939.

== History ==
The idea to build a royal palace on one of the hills of Sauk, near what was later to become the Grand Park of Tirana, was first conceived by King Zog I in the 1930s. Because of the limited funds of the nascent Albanian state, the then Minister of Finance, Mufid Libohova, entered into negotiations with a group of Italian financiers represented by Mario Alberti. An agreement was made for the opening of a national bank and for a loan of 50,000,000 gold francs (approximately 10,000,000 gold dollars). Part of this loan, also called "The SVEA Loan", was earmarked for the construction of his official residence, making it possible for the King to secure the funds to build the Royal Palace. The new palace was designed by three Italian architects, including Giulio Berte. Due to the outbreak of the Second World War, and the 1939 Italian Invasion of Albania, King Zog I fled Albania and never had a chance to see the palace fully constructed. The Italians finished construction and used the palace mainly for the Army Headquarters. The building was redesigned and completed in 1941, by the Florentine architect Gherardo Bosio.

The building served as a functioning royal palace only once, for King Vittorio Emanuele III of Italy during his only visit to Albania in May 1941. During the remainder of the Second World War, it served as the official residence for Francesco Jacomoni, the first Luogotenente del Re (the title of the Italian Viceroy), and later for his successor, the fascist general Alberto Pariani. Both lived there along with their families. After Italy capitulated in September 1943, the Albanian officer who served the palace hid the Palace's official flag from the Germans and sent it to Italy, where it remained until 2003, when it was purchased by Artan Lame and returned to Albania. After the German takeover of the country in September 1943, the Albanian parliament convened in the Palace and proclaimed the detachment of the Albanian Crown from the Italian Crown.

In 1945 the palace was renamed as the Palace of the Brigades, a name which remained in use throughout the Communist regime, and is still used popularly and by the Albanian media. During the Communist regime it served mainly as a government reception facility.

The official name of the palace was changed after the fall of the Communist regime in 1992 as the Presidential Palace.

In January 2010, the Municipality of Tirana proposed that parts of the palace be opened to the general public.

On 8 October 2016, Leka II, pretender to the throne of Albania, was allowed by the Albanian authorities to organise the wedding reception of his marriage to Elia Zaharia inside the premises of the Presidential Palace.

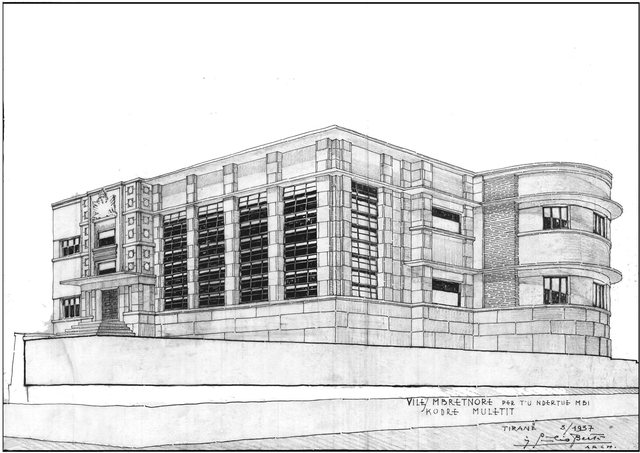
Design of the entrance facade

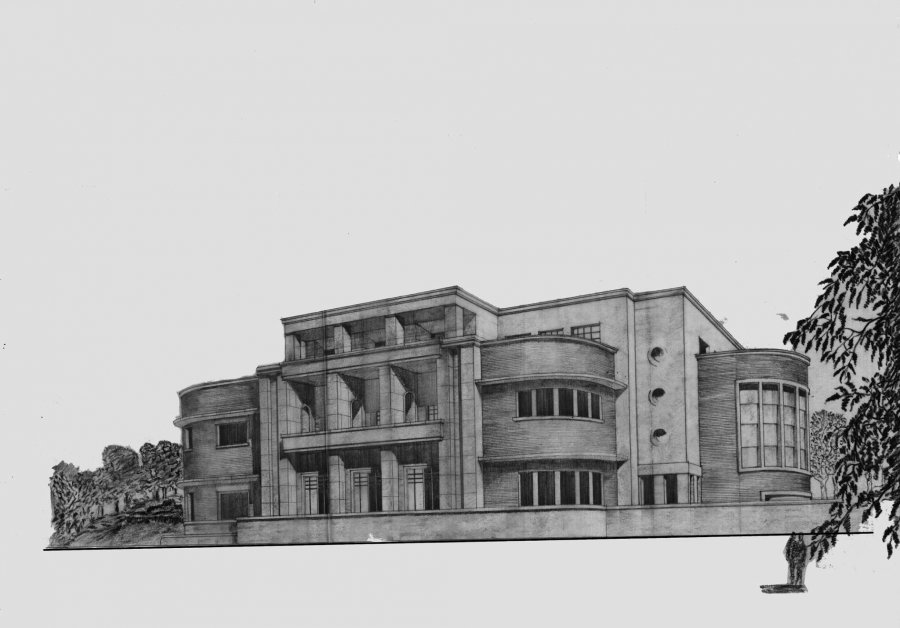
Design of the garden facade

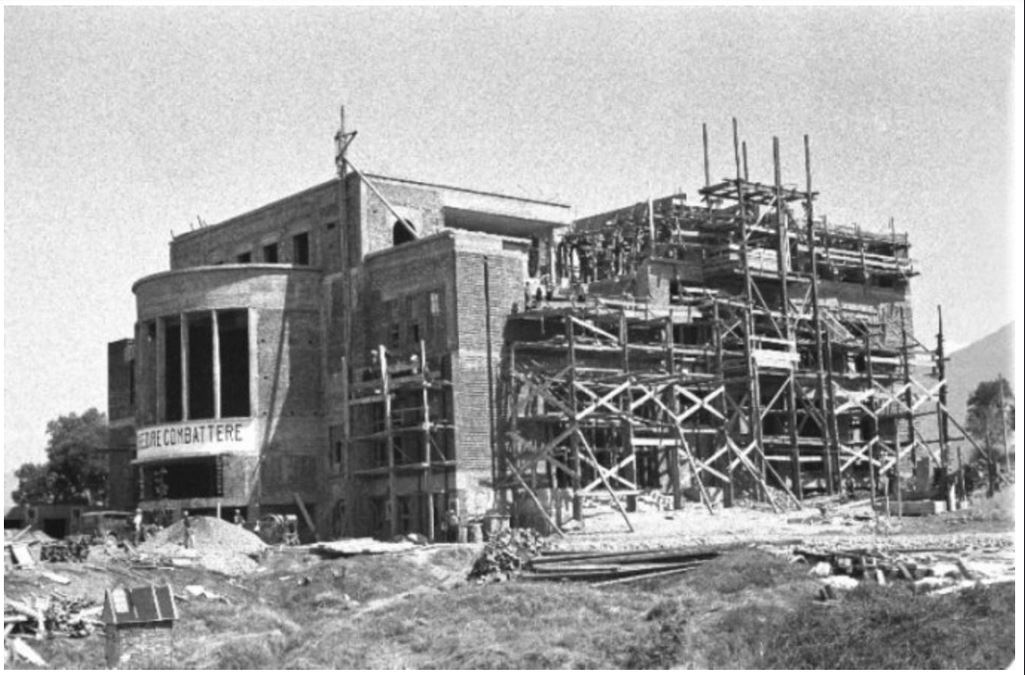
The palace being constructed (1936)

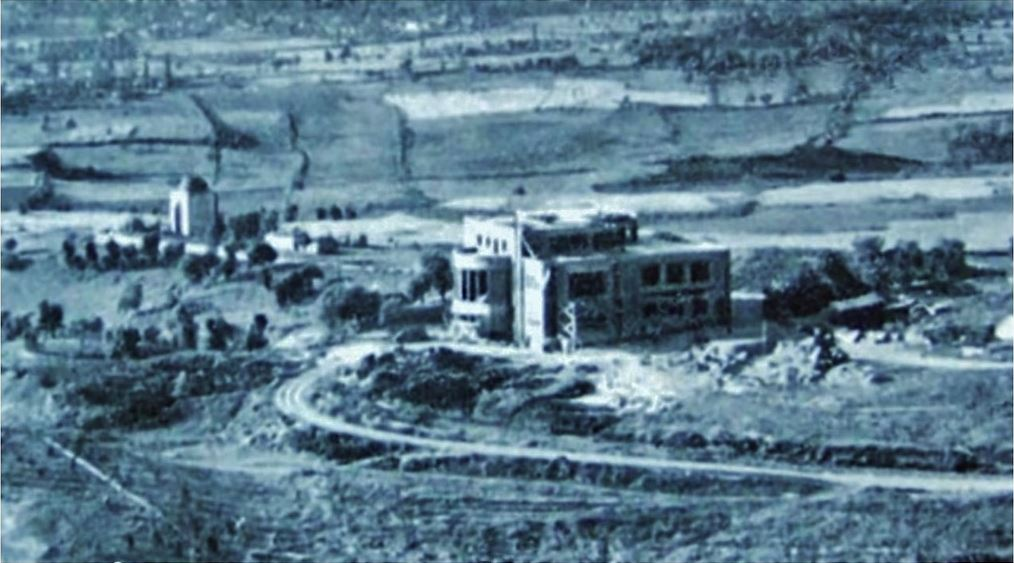
The palace in 1939

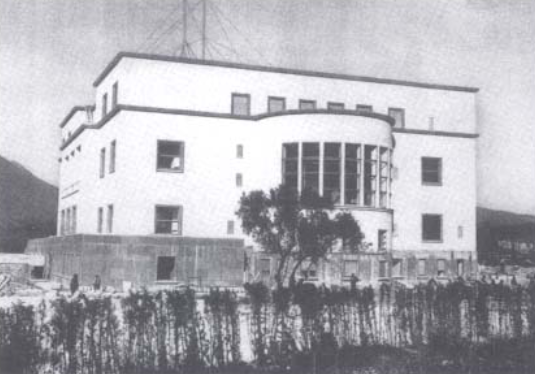
The palace during the Italian occupation

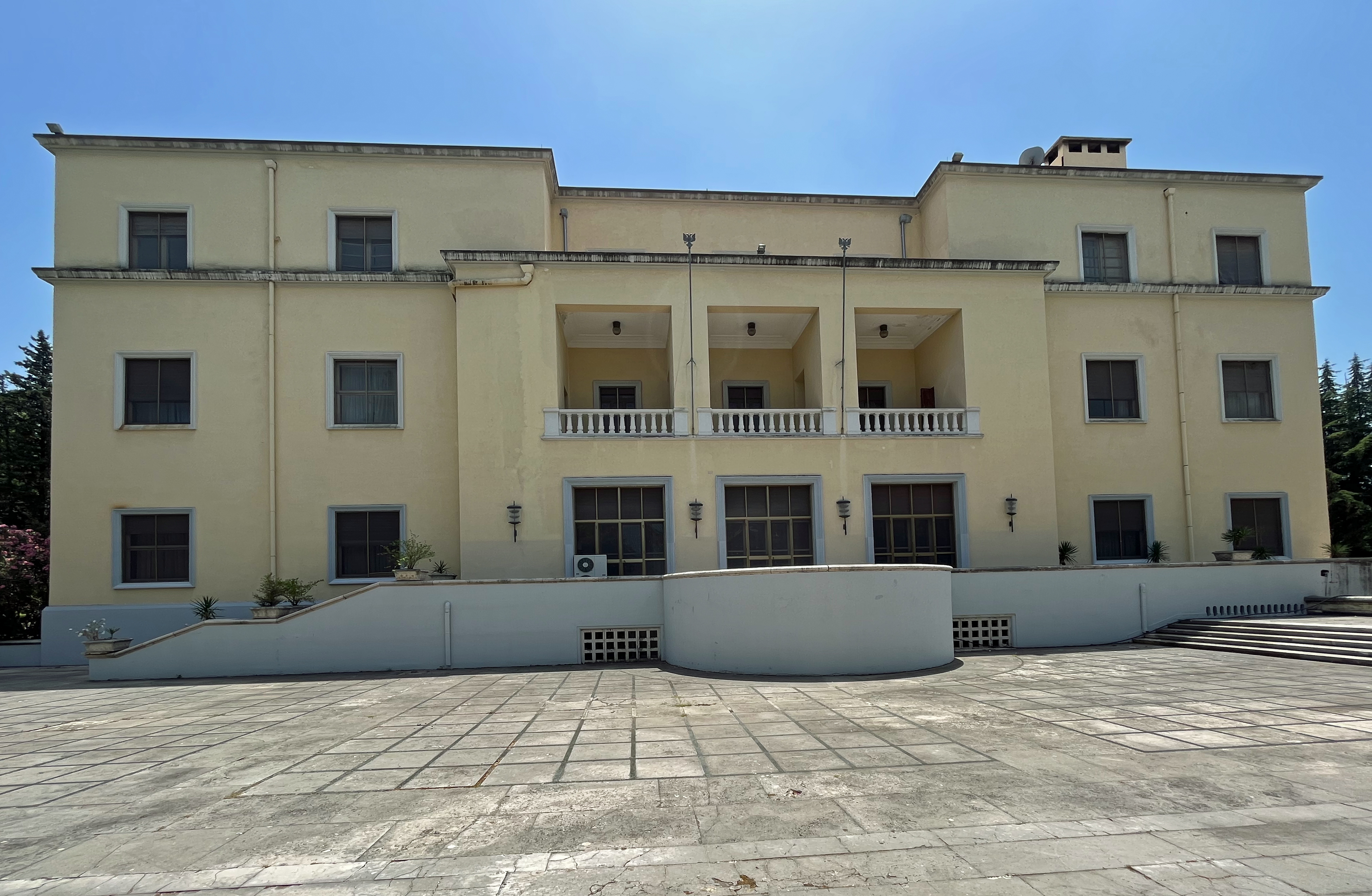
The north side of the palace

== Gardens ==
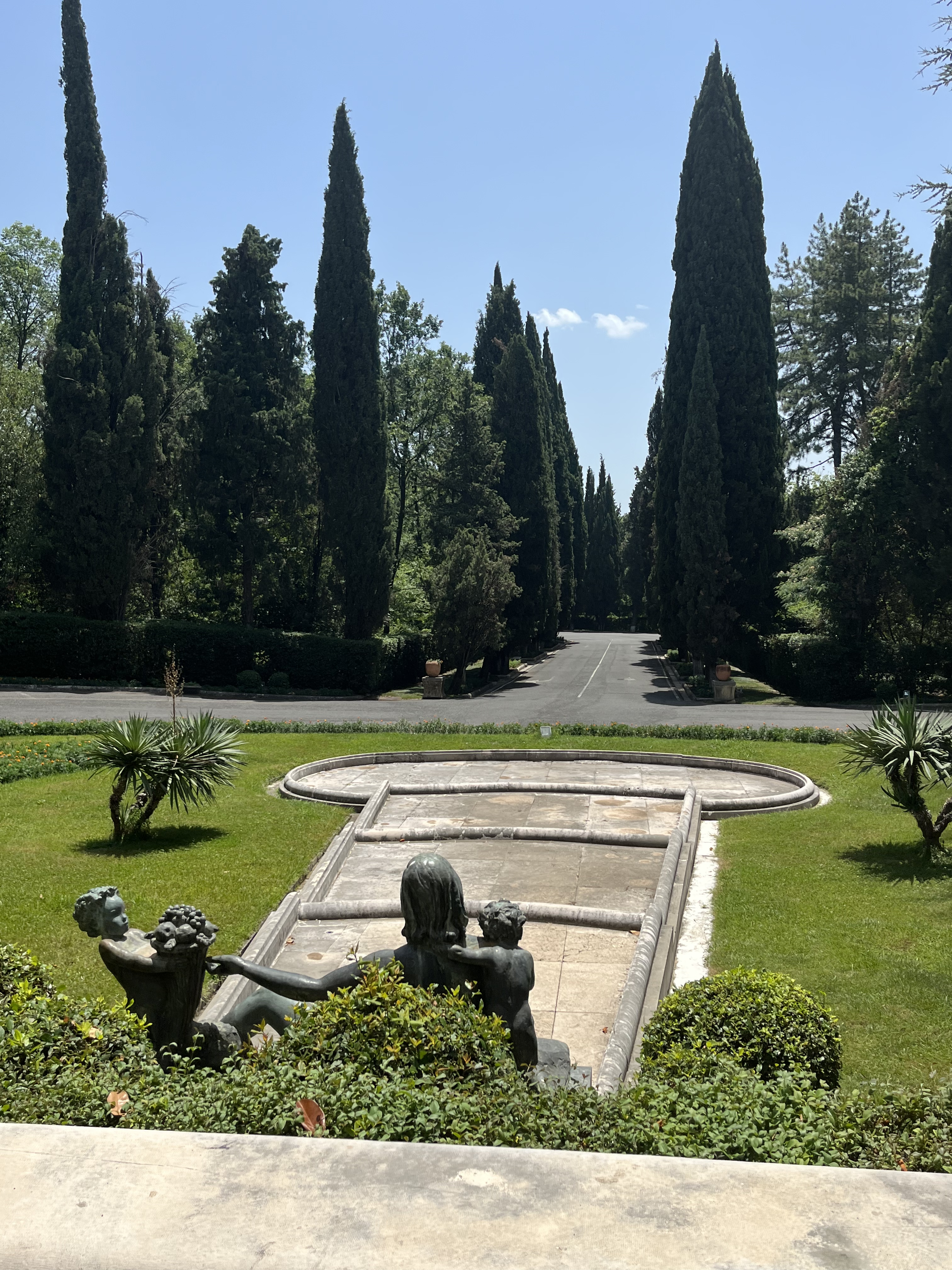
Gardens

Because of its situation near the Grand Park of Tirana, the palace gardens are quite extensive. The Royal Palace is surrounded by trees for nearly 200 metres. The gardens are decorated in patterns and shapes of various designs. The palace also has a tennis court.

== Challenge to government ownership ==
In February 2013, Leka Zogu, pretender to the throne of Albania and who styles himself as the Crown Prince of Albania, began a legal challenge, claiming that he was the rightful owner of the Presidential Palace on the grounds that the property had belonged to King Zog I in his personal capacity, and that thus Prince Leka retained ownership as the former's heir.

Leka Zogu claims to have won ownership of the building after a decision of August 2013 by the Supreme Court of Albania, and has declared that the palace would become the main official residence of the Royal Court of Albania (Albanian: Oborri Mbretëror Shqiptar); but as of 2016, the palace has remained in government possession and continues serving as the official residence of the president of the Republic of Albania, and State receptions and ceremonies, such as the annual end-of-year Presidential Ball, continue to be held in the palace.

== See also ==
- Politics of Albania
- President of Albania
- Presidential Office

== Bibliography ==
- Giusti, Maria Adriana (2012). "Villa Reale di Tirana: Architetture, Giardini, Arredi, Opere d'Arte, dai Progetti del Ventennio al Progetto di Restauro". In Godoli, Ezio; Tramonti, Ulisse (eds.). Architetti E Ingegneri Italiani in Albania (in Italian). Firenze: Edifir Edizioni. pp. 137–144.
