= Leka, Crown Prince of Albania =

Crown Prince of Albania from 1961 to 2011

Leka
- Crown Prince of Albania
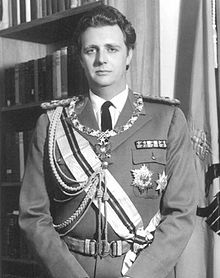

Head of the House of Zogu
- Period: 9 April 1961 – 30 November 2011
- Predecessor: King Zog I
- Successor: Leka, Prince of Albania
- Born: 5 April 1939; Royal Palace of Tirana, Kingdom of Albania
- Died: 30 November 2011 (aged 72); Mother Teresa Hospital (Tirana), Albania
- Burial: Mausoleum of the Albanian Royal Family
- Spouse: Susan Cullen-Ward (m. 1975; died 2004)
- Issue: Leka, Prince of Albania
Names
- Leka Skënder Zogu
- House: Zogu
- Father: Zog I of Albania
- Mother: Countess Géraldine Apponyi de Nagyappony

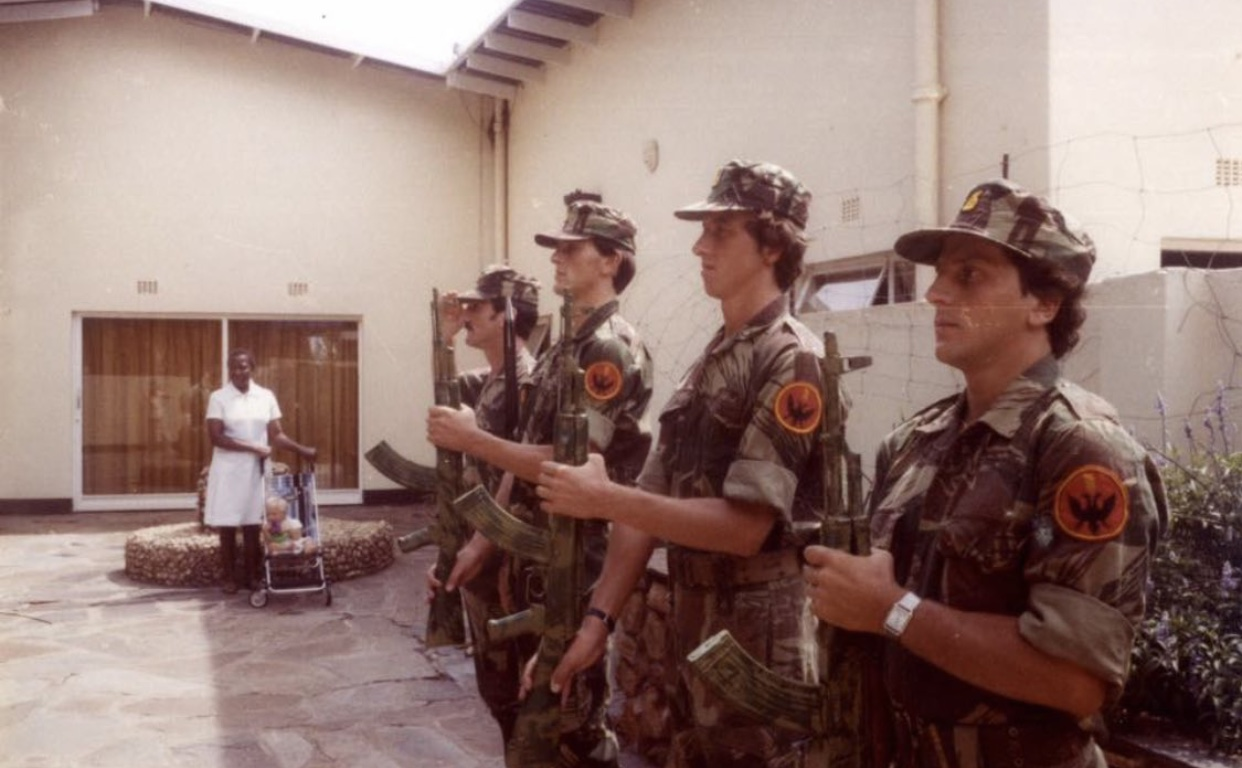
Exiled members of the former Royal Albanian Guard in Rhodesia in the 1970s

Leka, Crown Prince of Albania (Leka Skënder Zogu; 5 April 1939 – 30 November 2011) was the only son of King Zog I and Queen Geraldine of Albania. He was called Crown Prince Skander at birth. After his father's death in 1961, Leka was the pretender to the Albanian throne, and his supporters referred to him as King Leka I.

== Biography ==
=== Early life and education ===
Leka was born on April 5, 1939, in the Royal Palace of Tirana in the Kingdom of Albania. He was named Crown Prince Skander and his birth was celebrated with a 101-gun salute and a military parade. Leka was the son of King Zog I of Albania and Queen Geraldine of Albania.

Just two days after Leka's birth, King Zog I was forced into exile after Benito Mussolini's army invaded the country during the Italian invasion of Albania. Shortly after, Zog was replaced on the throne of Albania by Victor Emmanuel III of Italy — an action the King of Italy would later plead personal forgiveness for. Victor Emmanuel III remained King until his abdication in 1943, following the Armistice of Cassibile.

Crown Prince Leka began life in exile in various countries. After traveling across Europe, the Albanian Royal Family settled in England, first at the Ritz Hotel in London, then moving for a very short period in 1941 to South Ascot, near Ascot in Berkshire, and then in 1941 to Parmoor House, Parmoor, near Frieth in Buckinghamshire.

After the End of World War II in Europe, Zog, Queen Geraldine and Leka moved temporarily to Egypt, where they lived at the invitation of King Farouk I.

Leka attended school at Victoria College, Alexandria in Egypt and at Aiglon College in Villars-sur-Ollon, Switzerland. He studied economics at the University of Geneva and at the Sorbonne, and attended the Royal Military Academy Sandhurst in England. Following this he was commissioned as a Second Lieutenant in the British Army. He had since made his money with successful business deals in commodities.

Leka became heir apparent of the abolished throne on 5 April 1957. On the death of King Zog in 1961, Leka was proclaimed King of the Albanians by a convened Albanian National Assembly-in-exile, in a function room at the Hotel Bristol, Paris.

=== Marriage and exile ===
In 1975, Leka married Australian citizen and former teacher Susan Cullen-Ward. They were married in a civil ceremony in the Hôtel de Ville, Biarritz. The wedding reception, at a five-star Toledo Roadhouse, was attended by members of other exiled royal families, loyal Albanians and friends, who toasted "Long live the King". The couple returned to Madrid, where they were befriended by the Spanish King Juan Carlos I and continued to enjoy the attentions of Albanians. The couple married religiously in Madrid. Their wedding was officiated by a Muslim ulema, a Protestant pastor (because Susan was an Anglican), and a Roman Catholic priest (as Queen Geraldine was a Catholic).

When it was discovered that Leka not only retained some Thai bodyguards, but had what was described as an arms cache in their home, the Spanish government asked him to leave. When his plane arrived at Gabon for refueling, he found that it was being surrounded by local troops, who were said to have been hired to capture him by the Albanian government. The soldiers backed down when Leka appeared at the plane's door with a bazooka in his hand. The couple went on to Rhodesia but, after Robert Mugabe took power, they settled in a large compound near Johannesburg where they were given diplomatic status by the South African Government.

Leka spent many years exiled in Bryanston, South Africa, where his son Prince Leka was born, before eventually returning to Albania in 2002.

=== Return to Albania ===
In 1993 Leka was permitted to enter Albania for the first time (since being exiled aged a few days old in 1939), doing so under a passport issued by his own Royal Court-in-exile. In this royal passport, which the Albanian government had previously refused to recognise, Leka listed his profession as "King".

During the 1997 rebellion in Albania, Leka returned again, this time being greeted by 2,000 supporters. Many of Leka's royalist supporters felt that a restoration of the monarchy would help bring political and financial stability to the government, as well as help protect Albanian democracy, following decades of communist rule.

On June 29, a referendum was held in Albania concerning a restoration of the monarchy. Before the results had been finalized, Albanian government officials announced that the referendum had been rejected. Leka questioned the results of the election and claimed the vote had been manipulated. Leka protested, surrounded by roughly 20 guards, who were armed with assault rifles, grenades, and machine-guns. Leka himself was dressed in camouflage and carried two pistols. Albanian police had previously deployed armored vehicles and forces with heavy machine-guns, in case of any trouble ahead of the election.

On July 3, Leka led a crowd of 900 protesters, some armed, outside the main elections building, to protest, claiming election fraud had occurred. Royalist protesters sang at the rally, chanting "Brother, pick up the weapons. We'll fight or die, we'll win", as they waved pro-monarchy flags. 300 royalists then marched alongside Leka in the central Skanderbeg Square, causing police intervention. This led to a shootout between royalists and police, which lasted approximately 15 minutes. Gunfire and several grenade explosions went off, as nearby civilians scrambled for cover. Police killed one royalist protestor, Agim Gjonpalaj, and several others were injured in the gunfight. Gjonpalaj was both a monarchist and a pro-democracy advocate.

Gjonpalaj's funeral was held two days later, on June 5. President Sali Berisha called upon members of the Democratic Party of Albania to attend the funeral. Leka also attended, greeting mourners and walking with the coffin bearers. The funeral procession proceeded through Skanderbeg Square, where the violence had previously broken out two days before. Royalists at the funeral walked through the square, shouting "Down with Communism!"

After a recount it was announced by the government that the restoration was rejected by approximately two-thirds of those voting.

Albanian President Sali Berisha expressed his thoughts on the failed referendum in 2011:

"By 2003, the Albanian Parliament passed the law that recognized the attributes of the Royal Family and it was a right decision. Also I remind you that even the referendum was held in the context of flames of the communist rebellion and therefore cannot be considered a closed matter. The Stalinist principle of: 'you vote, but I count the votes' was applied in that referendum. But, the fact of the matter is the Albanians voted massively for their King, but the referendum failed to meet quotas as it was manipulated."

When Leka was later asked if he intended to leave Albania, he replied: "Why? It is my country", though he soon left Albania of his own accord on July 12. Following that, Leka was tried and sentenced by the Albanian government to three years imprisonment for sedition, in absentia. This conviction was later set aside in March 2002, when 72 members of Parliament asked the royal family to return. In June 2002, Leka returned to Albania and brought with him 11 cases of automatic weapons, grenades, and hunting arms. The authorities quickly seized them, though the weapons were returned to the royal family six years later, after being deemed items of cultural heritage. After his 2002 settlement in Albania, he lived out a quiet life with his wife and son. His wife died two years later in July 2004.

=== Further political activity ===
Leka was backed by the Party of Right and Legality (PLL), a right wing monarchist party and a marginal factor in Albanian politics. It formed a coalition with other parties in Albania. Leka, however, did not vote, stating that

I am above all political parties, even my own.

Leka was head of the Movement for National Development. He argued that he was a fighter for a Greater Albania in terms of ethnicity and that his restoration as king would make possible this goal. However, in February 2006, he announced he would be withdrawing from political and public life.

=== Death ===
Leka died on 30 November 2011 from a heart attack in Mother Teresa Hospital, Tirana. Albanian authorities held official ceremonies for the former Crown Prince, and declared December 3, the day of his funeral, a day of national mourning. Tirana's mayor Lulzim Basha stated at the funeral that "We have come here today ... to honor, with full historic gratitude and national pride, the work of Leka Zogu." Muslim, Catholic and Orthodox prayers were all read by religious leaders at the funeral. Leka's son, Leka, Prince of Albania stated "I, Prince Leka II, swear in front of the body of my father that I will follow the road of King Zogu, of King Leka I to be at the service of the nation, the homeland."

Leka was buried next to his wife's and mother's grave at the public Sharra cemetery in a Tirana suburb. Later he was buried at the Mausoleum of the Albanian Royal Family.

== Personal life ==
Leka was a Muslim and appealed for Islamic solidarity. He also spoke a half-dozen languages, including Albanian, Arabic and English.

Leka stood at a height of 6 ft 9 in (206 cm), much taller than his slim 5 ft 2 in (157 cm) wife Susan Cullen-Ward. Author Charles Fenyvesi gave a description of his appearance and manner in his 1979 book, Splendor in Exile:

"Leka is a tower of a man with a bulging middle, the deliberate swagger of John Wayne, and the innocent eyes of an English schoolboy. He wears clean, freshly ironed green army fatigues, well-shined black combat boots, and a pistol strapped to his belt. He explains that the insignias on his jacket denote his specialties: guerilla warfare, commando operations, armaments expertise, marksmanship. The patch of a crowned double-headed eagle marks the outfit an Albanian uniform; his cap badge identifies him as the commander in chief."

In the 1960s, Leka struck up a friendship with California Governor Ronald Reagan (later President of the United States), gifting him a baby elephant named "Gertie". This name was deemed unrefined by Nancy Reagan, who chose to rename the animal "GOP".

Leka, Crown Prince of Albania House of Zogu Born: 5 April 1939 Died: 30 November 2011
Titles in pretence
Preceded by King Zog	— TITULAR — King of the Albanians; 9 April 1961 – 30 November 2011; Reason for succession failure: Monarchy abolished in 1946	Succeeded by Leka, Prince of Albania
