= King of Albania =

Intermittent monarchy in 20th century

King of Albania Mbreti i Shqipërisë
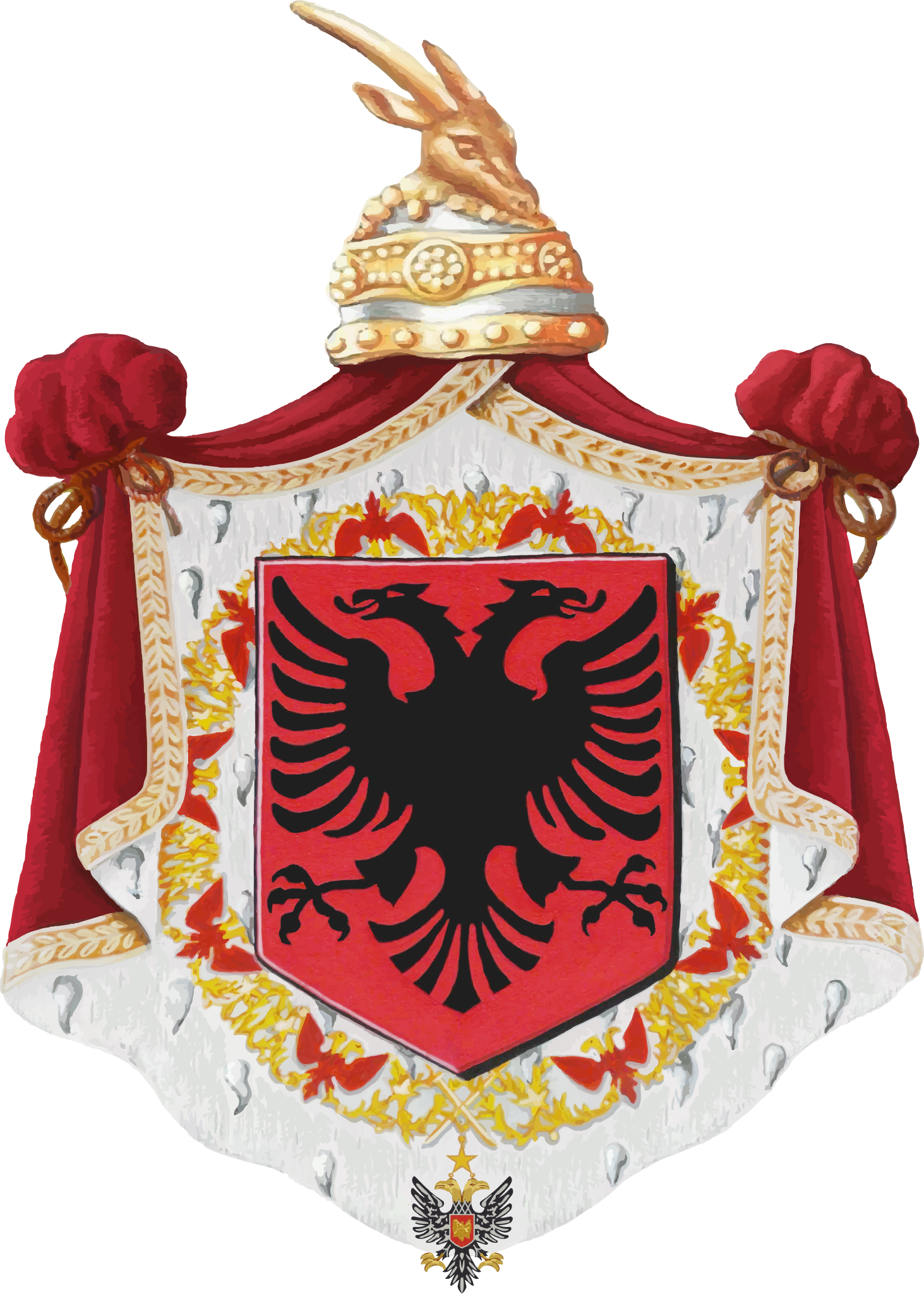
- Royal Coat of arms

Details
- Style: His Majesty
- First monarch: Charles I of Anjou
- Last monarch: Zog I (fully recognized until 1939, partially recognized until 1946); Victor Emmanuel III (Italian occupation from 1939, renounced in 1943)
- Formed: 1272
- Abolished: 11 January 1946 (creation of People's Republic of Albania)
- Residences: Royal Palace of Durrës; Royal Palace of Tirana; Royal Villa of Durrës; Burgajet Castle
- Appointer: Hereditary
- Pretender: Leka II

The King of Albania (Albanian: Mbreti i Shqipërisë) was a title styled by the official ruler of Albania. While the medieval Angevin Kingdom of Albania was a monarchy, it did not encompass the entirety of modern Albania. Although discontent among Albanian nobles emerged by 1282 due to the Angevin king's unfulfilled promises, the kingdom did not end at that time. Instead, Albanian nobles sought the support of the Roman Emperor in Constantinople, but Angevin rule continued in the region for several more decades. During the Middle Ages there have been many different Albanian nobles who called themselves ruler of Albania, including Dhimitër Progoni (Prince of the Albanians & Prince of Albania), Andrea II Muzaka (Despot of Albania), Karl Thopia (Prince of Albania), and Skanderbeg (Lord of Albania).

The modern Albania has been a kingdom on two occasions.

The first occasion was after the Albanian Declaration of Independence in 1912, though a monarch was not chosen until 1914. Prince Wilhelm of Wied assumed the throne but was forced into exile later that year as World War I led to the occupation of Albania. The country remained politically unstable until the establishment of the Albanian Republic in 1924.

The second instance began in 1928, when President Ahmet Zogu declared himself King Zog I. However, the continuity of the monarchy was disrupted by World War II. Albania was occupied by Italy from 1939 to 1943 and later by Nazi Germany until 1944. Following a civil war, the monarchy was formally abolished in 1946 with the establishment of the People's Republic of Albania.

After the fall of communism in 1992, Albania became a unitary parliamentary constitutional republic. Although the monarchy was never restored, hereditary pretenders to the title "King of the Albanians" continue to exist.

== History ==
The Albanian Congress of Trieste of 1913 discussed the question of the future prince and several candidates came through: Baron Franz Nopcsa von Felső-Szilvás, Marchese D'Auletta (claiming descendance from Skanderbeg) with the support of the Arbereshe delegates and Italy, Prince Albert Ghica from Romania supported by the Albanian colony there, and Aladro Kastriota.

Under the independence settlement imposed by the Great Powers, the country was styled a principality, and its ruler, William of Wied (German: Wilhelm zu Wied), was titled prince. However, these styles were only used outside the country. In Albanian, William was referred to as mbret, meaning king. This was because many local nobles already had the title of prince (princ, prinq, or prenk in various Albanian dialects), and because domestically the Albanian sovereign could not be seen as holding a title inferior to that of the king of Montenegro. Prince William's full style was: "By the grace of the powers and the will of the people the prince of Albania".

William was forced into exile by internal disorder just after the outbreak of World War I, and Albania was to be occupied by various foreign powers for most of the war. In the confusing aftermath of the war, some of the several regimes competing for power officially styled themselves as regencies for William. Albania's first monarchy ended definitively when the restored central government declared the country a republic in 1924.

Four years later, on September 1, 1928, President Ahmed Bey Zogu proclaimed himself "king of the Albanians" (Mbret i Shqiptarëve in Albanian). Zog sought to establish a constitutional monarchy. Under the royal constitution, the Albanian king, like the king of the Belgians, had to swear an oath before parliament before entering into his royal powers. The text of the oath was as follows:

I, name, King of the Albanians, on ascending the Throne of the Albanian Kingdom and assuming the Royal powers, swear in the presence of God Almighty that I will maintain national unity, the independence of the state, and its territorial integrity, and I will maintain and conform to the statute and laws in force, having the good of the people always in mind. So help me God!

Zog's kingdom was closely tied to Italy, then ruled by Victor Emmanuel III. On April 7, 1939, Italy occupied Albania, treating it as the Italian protectorate of Albania. Zog fled the country, though he never abdicated, and five days later the Albanian Parliament proclaimed Victor Emmanuel as the new King of the Albanians. When the Italian Armed Forces started being decimated in 1943, Victor Emmanuel signed the Armistice of Cassibile with the Allies on 3 September 1943, which included his abdication as the Albanian monarch and the end of the so-called protectorate. While Zog I was reinstated as king (in absentia) by pro-monarchy partisans, this action was opposed by pro-communist partisans, all made moot as Nazi Germany immediately commenced the German occupation of Albania. The Germans were pushed out by late 1944, by which point the partisan factions were basically fighting a civil war. This continued until the socialist People's Republic of Albania was established in 1946.

During and after World War II, some Albanians worked for the return of King Zog; however, they were not successful. Neither Zog nor Victor Emmanuel had the Albanian royal title widely acknowledged by the international community. Zog's son, Crown Prince Leka (1939–2011), was the main pretender to the Albanian Crown. As he himself stated, his title was not "king of Albania" but "king of the Albanians", which included a claim to Kosovo and part of today's North Macedonia. Since Crown Prince Leka's death in late November, 2011, the main pretender to the Albanian Throne is his son Leka II.

== Proclaimed Sovereigns of Albania ==
This is a compilation of rulers who proclaimed themselves as the sovereigns of Albania and or Albanians as a unified entity, throughout history. Holding various titles such as kings, princes, despots, lords, etc. Starting from one of the first established Albanian monarchies. Dhimitër Progoni from the Progoni family in the 12th-13th century.

=== House of Progoni ===
Picture	^{Title}Name	Reign	Notes
	^{Princeps Albaniae} Dhimitër Progoni	1208–1216	Dhimitër Progoni styled himself as (Princeps Arbanorum) Prince of the Albanians and (Princeps Albaniae) Prince of Albania and was the first to identify his domain as (Principatum Albaniae) Principality of Albania/Arbanon, marking a significant assertion of his authority and the identity of his domain during his rule.

=== House of Muzaka ===
Picture	^{Title}Name	Reign	Notes
	^{Despot of Albania} Andrea II Muzaka	1331–1372	Andrea II Muzaka, a ruler of the Principality of Muzaka, garnered significant titles during his reign, including (Despotus Regni Albaniae) Despot of the Kingdom of Albania and Marshal of Albania. Andrea II expanded his principality to its greatest extent, earning accolades for his victories against Serbian invasions and his strategic alliances with neighboring Albanian noble families.

=== House of Anjou ===
Picture	^{Title}Name	Reign	Notes
	^{Regnum Albaniae} Charles I of Anjou	1272–1285	Charles I, also known as Charles of Anjou or Charles d'Anjou, held the title of (Regnum Albaniae) King of Albania from 1272 until his death in 1285. Charles acquired the title of King of Albania through negotiations and agreements with local Albanian leaders, solidifying his presence and influence in the region.
	^{Regnum Albaniae} Charles II of Naples	1285–1294	Charles II, also known as Charles the Lame, inherited the title of (Regnum Albaniae) King of Albania after the death of his father Charles I. Ultimately, Charles II's reign as King of Albania came to an end in 1294, when he gifted it to his son Philip I, Prince of Taranto.
	^{Regnum Albaniae} Philip I, Prince of Taranto	1294–1331	Philip I of Taranto's acquisition of the title (Regnum Albaniae) King of Albania was part of a diplomatic marriage arrangement orchestrated by his father, Charles II of Anjou, King of Naples. In 1294, Philip married Thamar Angelina Komnene. As part of the marriage agreement, Charles II ceded to Philip the suzerainty of Achaea and the Kingdom of Albania, along with other rights and titles.
	^{Regnum Albaniae} Robert, Prince of Taranto	1331–1332	Upon his father's death in 1331, Robert II of Taranto inherited his titles, including that of (Regnum Albaniae) King of Albania. In 1332, he struck a deal with his uncle, John of Gravina, exchanging his rights to the Kingdom of Albania for the Principality of Achaea. This transaction solidified Robert's control over Achaea while relinquishing his claim to Albania.
	^{Duke of Durazzo} John, Duke of Durazzo	1332–1336	John of Gravina's ascent to the title (Regnum Albaniae) King of Albania was a strategic maneuver following a pivotal deal with his nephew, Robert II of Taranto. Although he never formally assumed a royal title during his reign, John wielded authority over the Kingdom of Albania. Opting for the more modest title of Duke of Durazzo.
	^{Duke of Durazzo} Charles, Duke of Durazzo	1336–1348	Charles of Durazzo, the eldest son of John, Duke of Durazzo, inherited his titles in Albania through succession. Upon his father's death, Charles succeeded him as Duke of Durazzo and Count of Gravina in 1336.
	^{Duchess of Durazzo} Joanna, Duchess of Durazzo	1348–1368	Joanna of Durazzo inherited her titles in Albania upon the death of her father, Charles, Duke of Durazzo, in 1348, when she was just four years old. As the eldest surviving child, Joanna succeeded her father as Duchess of Durazzo. In 1365, at the age of twenty-one, Joanna married her first husband, Louis of Navarre, who became Duke of Durazzo by virtue of his marriage to Joanna.
	^{Duke of Durazzo} Louis, Duke of Durazzo	1366–1368,1376	Louis of Évreux inherited his Albanian title Duke of Durazzo through his second marriage in 1366 to Joanna, Duchess of Durazzo. Louis's marriage to Joanna not only brought him the rights to Durazzo but also to the Kingdom of Albania and the title (Regnum Albaniae) King of Albania, which he sought to recover. Durazzo, the remnant of the kingdom, was under the control of Karl Thopia at the time. Louis received assistance from his brother and the King of France in his efforts to reclaim Durazzo and Albania. In 1372, he brought over the Navarrese Company of mercenaries, who had previously fought with him during the war in France, to assist in the campaign. After meticulous military planning and engineering, they succeeded in taking the city in midsummer 1376. However, Louis died shortly after, leaving his ambitious plans unfinished.
	^{Duke of Durazzo} Robert IV of Artois, Count of Eu	1376-1383	Robert IV of Artois, became Duke of Durazzo in 1376 through his marriage to Joanna, Duchess of Durazzo. It brought him the rights to Durazzo but also to the Kingdom of Albania and the title (Regnum Albaniae) King of Albania. His tenure as Duke lasted until 1383, a period marked by political turbulence and conflict. In 1383, Robert's rule in Durazzo came to an abrupt end when Karl Thopia, an Albanian nobleman, took control of the city.

=== House of Thopia ===
Picture	^{Title}Name	Reign	Notes
	^{Princeps Albanese} Karl Thopia	1358–1388	In 1358 Karl Thopia emerged as a prominent Albanian feudal prince. He inherited the Principality of Albania from his father Andrea I Thopia Rising against the Anjou dynasty, Karl seized control of Durrës and held the title of (Princeps Albaniae) Prince of Albania. Great-grandson of Charles II.
	^{Princeps Albanese} Gjergj Thopia	1388–1392	After his father's death in 1388, Gjergj assumed the title of (Princeps Albaniae) Prince of Albania and became the Lord of Durrës. He held this position until 1392 when he was compelled to cede Durrës to the Republic of Venice. Gjergj died later that year without an heir.

=== House of Kastrioti ===
Picture	^{Title}Name	Reign	Notes
	^{Dominus Albaniae} Gjergj Kastrioti	1443–1468	Gjergj Kastrioti, known as Skanderbeg, initiated the League of Lezhë in 1444 by bringing together prominent Albanian noble families in the city of Lezhë. Proclaiming himself Chief of the League of the Albanian People, Skanderbeg secured the support of the Albanian nobles forming a unified front against the Ottoman Empire. He held the title (Dominus Albaniae) Lord of Albania.

=== House of Wied ===
Picture	^{Title}Name	Reign	Notes
	^{Prince of Albania} Wilhelm, Prince of Albania	1914–1925	Prince Wilhelm of Wied became the Prince of Albania after being selected by the Great Powers in November 1913. Despite initially declining the offer, he accepted the throne in February 1914 and arrived in Albania in March of the same year. His reign, marked by internal revolts and external pressures during World War I, was short-lived, and he left the country in September 1914. Despite aspirations for restoration, Albania was declared a republic in 1925, officially ending his reign. He died in Romania in 1945, leaving his son, Hereditary Prince Carol Victor, as heir to his Albanian claims.

=== House of Zogu ===
Picture	^{Title}Name	Reign	Notes
	^{King of the Albanians} Zog I	1928–1939	Zog I, originally Ahmed Zogu, rose to power in Albania through a series of political maneuvers and alliances. After serving as Prime Minister and President, he declared himself King of the Albanians in 1928, establishing a monarchy. His reign saw attempts at modernization but also increased Italian influence. Forced into exile by Italy's invasion in 1939, he spent his later years moving between countries until his death in 1961.

=== House of Savoy ===
Picture	^{Title}Name	Reign	Notes
	^{King of Albania} Victor Emmanuel III	1939–1943	Victor Emmanuel III became King of Albania in 1939 and it was a result of Italian imperialism under fascism. It occurred when Italian forces invaded Albania, causing King Zog I to flee. This move was part of Mussolini's expansionist ambitions and was met with resistance from the Albanian people. During his brief reign as King of Albania, Victor Emmanuel faced challenges, including assassination attempts that underscored the resistance to Italian rule. Despite assuming the title of King of the Albanians, Victor Emmanuel's reign over Albania was short-lived and marked by opposition and unrest.

== See also ==
- History of Albania
- List of Albanian monarchs
- List of Albanian consorts
- Regalia of Albania
- House of Zogu
- Otto Witte, a German circus acrobat who claimed to have been crowned king for a few days.

== Bibliography ==
- Patrice Najbor, Histoire de l'Albanie et de sa maison royale (5 volumes), JePublie, Paris, 2008, (ISBN 978-2-9532382-0-4).
- Patrice Najbor, La dynastye des Zogu, Textes & Prétextes, Paris, 2002
