= Leka, Prince of Albania =

Albanian royal (born 1982)

Leka
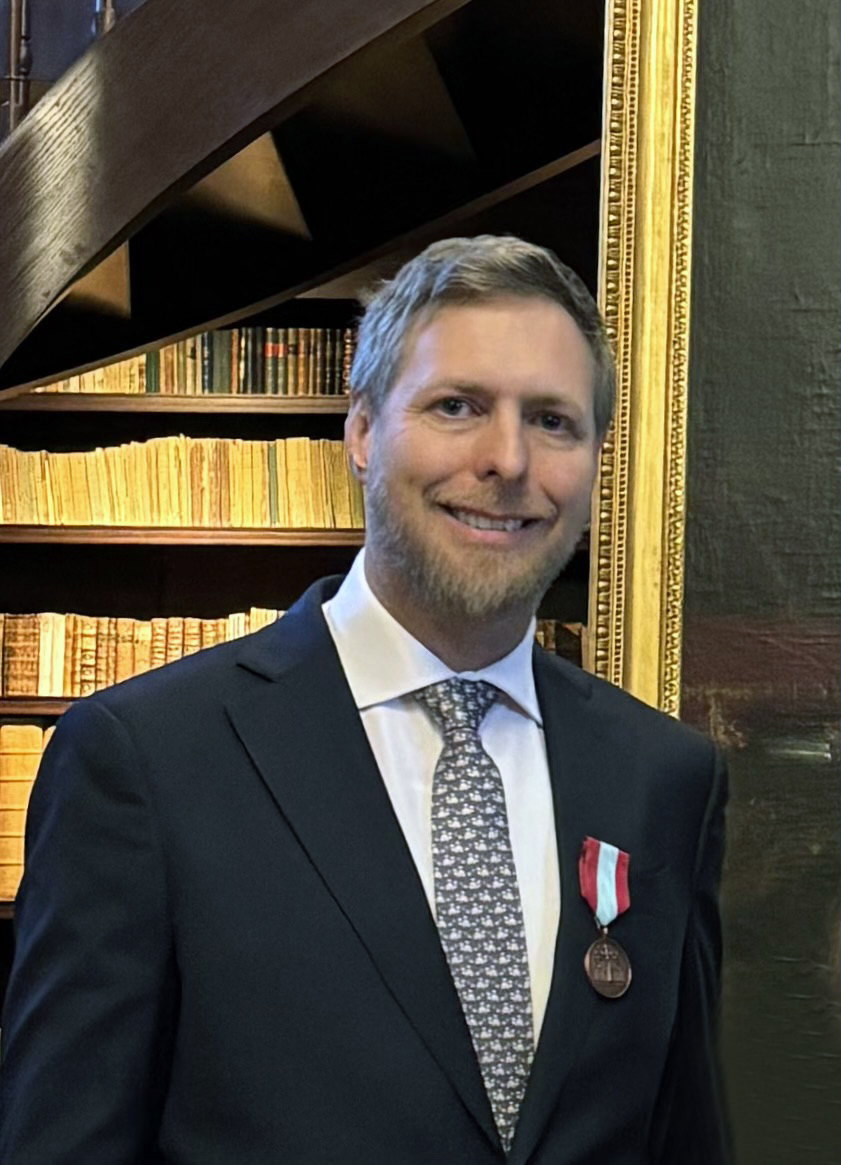
- Prince Leka in 2026

Head of the House of Zogu
- Period: 30 November 2011 – present
- Predecessor: Leka, Crown Prince of Albania
- Born: 26 March 1982 (age 44); Sandton Clinic, Johannesburg, South Africa
- Spouse: Elia Zaharia (m. 2016; div. 2024) Blerta Celibashi (m. 2026)
- Issue: Princess Geraldine; Prince Aleksandër
Names
- Leka Anwar Zog Reza Baudouin Msiziwe Zogu
- House: Zogu
- Father: Leka, Crown Prince of Albania
- Mother: Susan Cullen-Ward

Leka, Prince of Albania (Leka Anwar Zog Reza Baudouin Msiziwe Zogu, born 26 March 1982) is the current head of the House of Zogu, the former royal family of Albania.

He was born on 26 March 1982, at Mediclinic Sandton Hospital, in Johannesburg, South Africa, and is the only child of Leka, Crown Prince of Albania and his wife Susan, Crown Princess of Albania. He is the only grandchild of King Zog I of the Albanians, succeeding as head of the royal house upon the death of his father in 2011. He has worked as an official at the country's interior and foreign ministries. He also served as a political advisor to the Albanian President from 2012 to 2013.

In May 2010, Leka became engaged to Elia Zaharia, an Albanian actress and singer. They married on 8 October 2016 in Tirana. In January 2024, they revealed they were getting a divorce.

== Early life ==
Leka is the son of the pretender to the defunct throne of Albania, Crown Prince Leka, and his Australian wife Crown Princess Susan.

He was named in honour of Egyptian president Anwar El Sadat, his grandfather King Zog I, Emperor Mohammed Reza of Iran, and Baudouin I, King of the Belgians. Msiziwe is a Zulu term meaning 'the one who was assisted'. Leka is a member of the House of Zogu.

== Education and activities ==
Leka was educated in South Africa at St Peter's College, Johannesburg, and in the United Kingdom at the Royal Military Academy Sandhurst, where he was named Best Foreign Student of the academy, being congratulated by the Albanian Minister of Defence. He was also attended the Skanderbeg Military Academy in Albania for three months, at the Università per Stranieri in Perugia, where he studied the Italian language, and in Kosovo, where he studied international relations.

On 5 April 2004, Leka accepted the Mother Teresa Medal on behalf of his late grandmother, Queen Géraldine, for her humanitarian efforts.

On 24 June 2010, Prince Leka unveiled a blue plaque at Parmoor House in Buckinghamshire, United Kingdom, which was the home of King Zog during his wartime exile.

== Public service ==
On 21 August 2007, Foreign Minister Lulzim Basha announced that Leka had been appointed to his office. The prince intended to pursue a career in diplomacy. After three years he was transferred to the office of the Minister of Interior. After the election of Bujar Nishani as president in 2012, Leka was appointed as political adviser to the President.

Leka was rumoured to be a candidate in the 2022 Albanian presidential election though no candidates were disclosed and the position ultimately went to Bajram Begaj.

== Personal life ==
Prince Leka is a Muslim while his mother Susan was an Anglican Christian and his grandmother Sadije Toptani a Bektashi Muslim. His ex-wife Princess Elia is an Orthodox.

=== First marriage ===
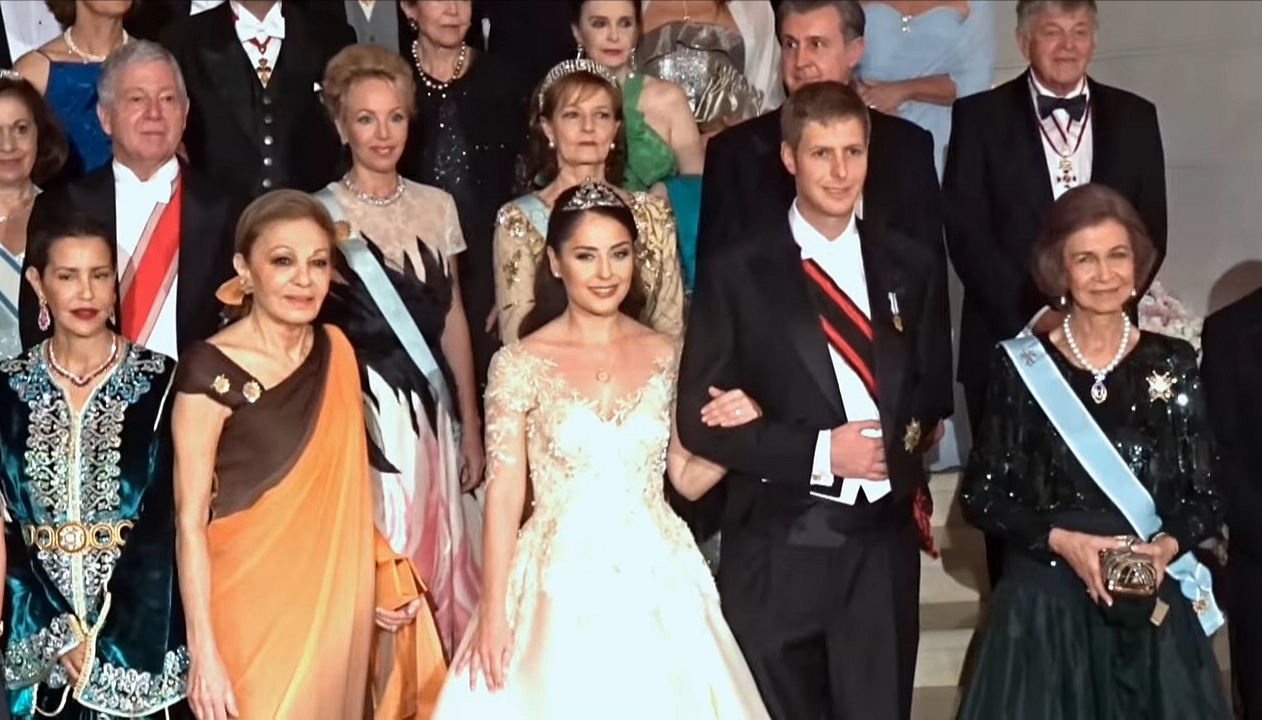
Wedding, 2016. Front row, left to right: Princess Lalla Meryem of Morocco, Empress Farah of Iran, Elia, Leka, Queen Sofía of Spain. Second row, left to right: Alexander, Crown Prince of Serbia, Princess Camilla of Bourbon-Two Sicilies, Margareta of Romania, Prince Radu of Romania, Nicholas, Prince of Montenegro.

Leka met Elia Zaharia in Paris, and in May 2010 they were engaged.

On 27 March 2016, Skënder Zogu, a member of the Zogu family, announced that the couple would be married on 8 October 2016 in the Royal Palace in Tirana.

Leka was married on Saturday 8 October 2016 in Tirana. The ceremony was a semi-official ceremony, held in Tirana in the Royal Palace, with many guests including members of other noble and royal families. The event was a civil wedding officiated by the Mayor of Tirana, Erion Veliaj. A blessing was given by the five religious leaders of Albania representing the faiths of Sunni Islam, Bektashi, and the Christian traditions of Orthodox, Catholic and Protestant. This tradition of the Albanian royal family is part of the tradition of religious tolerance in Albania.

Wedding guests included friends and relatives from around the world including relatives of his mother from Australia. Guests also included members of other royal families from neighbouring countries and further afield. These included Queen Sofía of Spain and Prince and Princess Michael of Kent. Prince Michael of Kent is a first cousin of Queen Elizabeth II and his wife Princess Michael of Kent is related to Prince Leka through her mother, Countess Marianne Szapáry, who was a 5th cousin of Queen Géraldine and had been a bridesmaid at her wedding to King Zog in 1938. Other royal guests included Empress Farah of Iran, Crown Prince Alexander and Crown Princess Katherine of Yugoslavia, Crown Princess Margareta of Romania, Custodian of the Crown and Prince Radu of Romania, Nicholas, Prince of Montenegro, Prince Guillaume of Luxembourg together with Princess Sibilla, Georg Friedrich, Prince of Prussia, Princess Léa of Belgium and other members from the royal families of Russia, Liechtenstein, Romania, Greece, Georgia, Morocco and members of other noble families. Heads of state of Albania also attended the ceremony.

Elia gave birth to a daughter, Princess Geraldine, on 22 October 2020 at Queen Geraldine Maternity Hospital in Tirana, on the 18th anniversary of Leka's grandmother Queen Geraldine's death. Their daughter was named Geraldine in her honour. On 28 January 2023, on the day of her baptism, her full name is Geraldine Sibilla Francesca Susan Marie, and her godparents are Princess Sibilla of Luxembourg and Thomas Frashëri, a family friend.

On 15 January 2024, Prince Leka and Elia announced on their Instagram page that they would be getting a mutual divorce as their marriage was no longer functioning. Leka confirmed plans for the divorce two days prior on his personal Instagram page as well. They divorced on 25 April 2024.

=== Second marriage ===
On 11 October 2025, Leka became engaged to Blerta Celibashi in a private ceremony in Sarandë, near the beach. They got married on 15 March 2026, in a private civil ceremony at Apponyi Castle in Slovakia. Blerta gave birth to a son, Prince Aleksandër, on 10 July 2026 at Queen Geraldine Maternity Hospital in Tirana.

== Honours and awards ==
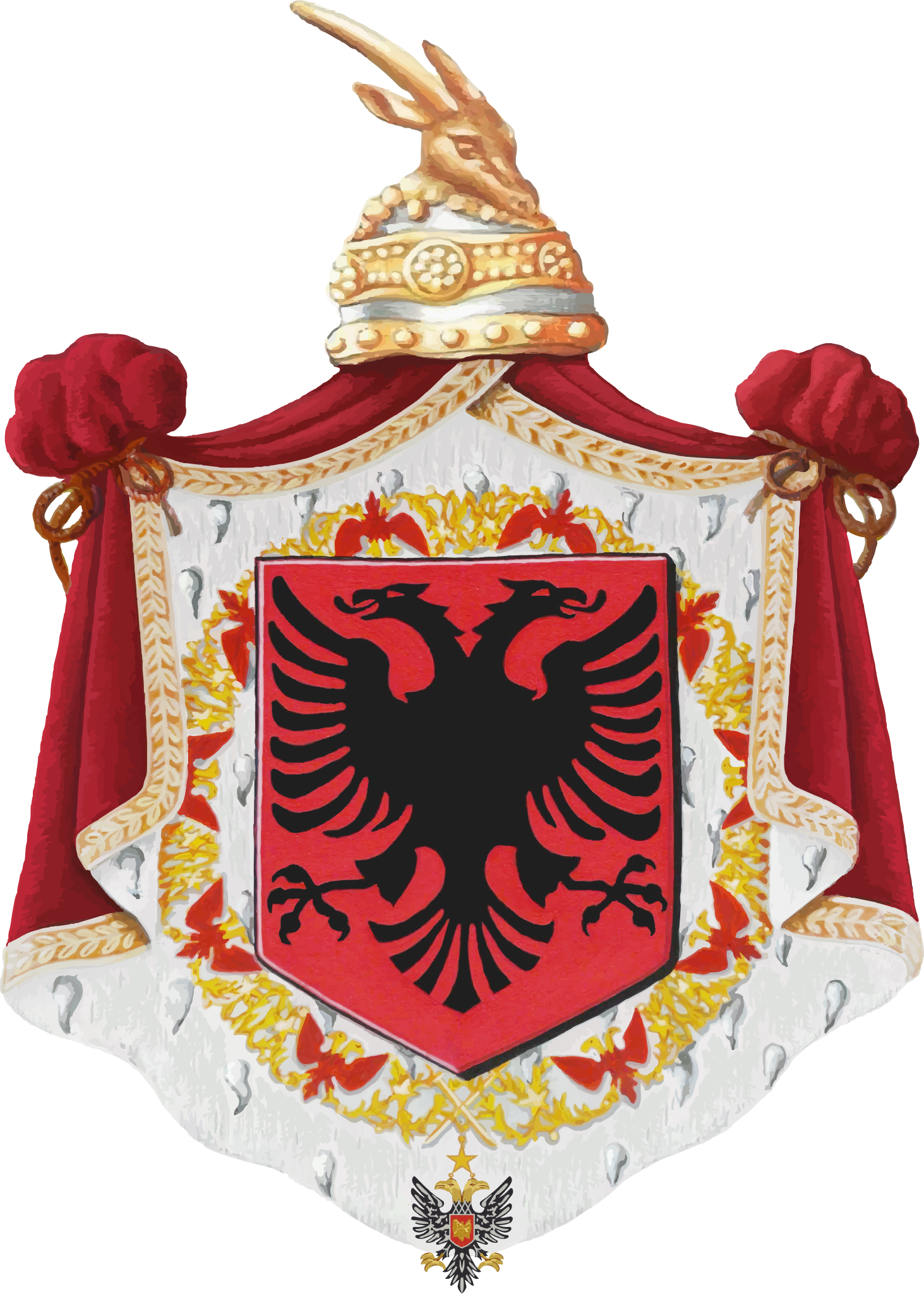
Arms of Prince Leka

=== Honours ===
==== National dynastic honours ====
- (Albanian Kingdom (1928–1939)) House of Zogu: Highest Holder of the Grand Collar of Honour of Albania
- (Albanian Kingdom (1928–1939)) House of Zogu: Grand Master of the Order of Fidelity
- (Albanian Kingdom (1928–1939)) House of Zogu: Grand Master of the Order of Skanderbeg
- (Albanian Kingdom (1928–1939)) House of Zogu: Grand Master of the Military Order of Bravery

==== Foreign and dynastic awards ====
- (Kingdom of Italy) Italian Royal Family: Knight Grand Cross of the Order of Saints Maurice and Lazarus
- (Kingdom of the Two Sicilies) Two Sicilian Royal Family: Knight Grand Cross of the Royal Order of Francis I
- Russian Imperial Family: Knight of the Imperial Order of Saint Andrew
- Slovakia: Commemorative Medal of the Tree of Peace from the Servare et Manere association
- Sovereign Military Order of Malta: Grand Cross of the Order pro Merito Melitensi

== See also ==
- Heads of former ruling families

== Bibliography ==
- Patrice Najbor, Histoire de l'Albanie et de sa maison royale (5 volumes), JePublie, Paris, 2008, (ISBN 978-2-9532382-0-4).
- Patrice Najbor, la dynastye des Zogu, Textes & Prétextes, Paris, 2002
- Geraldine of the Albanians; Robyns, Gwen – ISBN 0-584-11133-9
- Rees, Neil: A Royal Exile – King Zog & Queen Geraldine of Albania including their wartime exile in the Thames Valley and Chilterns, 2010 (ISBN 978-0-9550883-1-5)
