= Senije Zogu =

Albanian princess (1903–1969)

- Princess of Ottoman Empire (1936-1949)
- Born: 1903; Burgajet Castle, Governorate of Mati, Ottoman Empire
- Died: 28 April 1969 (aged 65–66); Cannes, France
- Burial: Thiais Cemetery
- Spouse: Şehzade Mehmed Abid (m. 1936; div. 1949)
- House: Zogu
- Father: Xhemal Pasha Zogu
- Mother: Sadije Toptani
- Religion: Islam

Princess Senije Zogu (1903–1969) was an Albanian princess. She was the daughter of Xhemal Pasha Zogu and Sadije Toptani, his second wife, and was the third of six sisters of King Zog I of Albania. When her brother became monarch in 1928, she and her siblings were granted the status of Prince and Princess Zogu. She was the chairperson of the Albanian Red Cross and the women's organisation Gruaja Shiqiptare in 1928–1939.

== Life ==
Princess Senije (Xenia) was described as the favorite sister of Zog I, and the affection was reportedly mutual. After the death of the queen mother, Princess Senije performed the representational duties of first lady until the marriage of her brother to queen Geraldine in 1938.

=== Public life ===
In contrast to his two eldest sisters, Princess Adile Zogu and Nafije Zogu, who was seldom seen in public, the king gave his four younger sisters official roles to play in the royal representation. During the first years of his reign, the princesses lived a traditional isolated life in the royal palace complex and seldom appeared outside of the family circle, but this changed by the time of the wedding of Princess Senije in 1936.

Her wedding was a public affair, and from that year onward, the king regularly arranged formal royal balls, and had his four younger sisters appear in public on official royal representational assignments: Senije was assigned tasks within health care, Ruhije Zogu education, Myzejen Zogu culture, and Maxhide Zogu attended to tasks within sports. To prepare them for this task, they were given lessons in piano playing, dance, language and riding, and were sent for several trips to Western Europe, where they became known for their expensive shopping trips. When the king banned the hijab in 1937, he made sure his sisters appeared in public without veils and dressed in Western fashion as role models for other women.

Princess Senije was appointed chairperson of the Albanian Red Cross by the king in October 1928. The same year, the king abolished all women's organisations in Albania, and replaced them with a single woman's organisation controlled by the state, the Gruaja Shiqiptare. This organisation was to be chaired by the chairperson of the Albanian Red Cross, who was, in turn, to be appointed by the monarch, and Princess Senije consequently became the chairperson of the Gruaja Shiqiptare. The task of this state woman's organisation was to support the official policy within women's rights rather than to act independently. The government policy was however radical, as the Civil Code of 1928 stated that women had equal right to inheritance and divorce, abolished arranged and forced marriage and polygamy and gave women the right to education and a professional life. Under Princess Senije, the Gruaja Shiqiptare founded local branches in 20 cities, published its own paper and supported numerous projects in support of the regime's women's policy, especially regarding education; in reality, however, the work did not manage to achieve much success outside of the cosmopolitan elite of the cities.

When the king searched for a spouse in the late 1930s, his sister was given the task to attend balls in Europe in search of a bride among the European nobility. In 1937, Princess Senije, on the king's request, invited the future Geraldine of Albania to the new's years eve ball at the royal palace of Tirana, where he proposed to her. Prior to the royal wedding in 1938, the three youngest princesses made a trip to the USA, where they were given much attention, but Senije did not accompany them.

=== Exile ===
Princess Senije left Albania with the rest of the royal family in 1939 upon the outbreak of World War II, and followed the former monarch in exile to Great Britain in 1940. She, as well as the rest of the sisters except Adile, followed Zog to Egypt in 1946. In Egypt, she and Princess Myzejen, in particular, kept in contact with the Albanian colony there. In 1955, she and the rest of the family followed Zog to France, where he died. She lived in France with her sisters until her death.

Princess Senije married Prince Şehzade Mehmed Abid (1905–1973), son of Abdul Hamid II, in 1936, and divorced him in 1949. They had no children.

== Honours ==
- Dame Grand Cross of the Order of Fidelity (Kingdom of Albania).

== Ancestry ==
8. Mahmud Pasha Zogolli, Governor of Mati
4. Xhelal Pasha Zogolli, Governor of Mati
2. Xhemal Pasha Zogu, Governor of Mati
5. Ruhijé Alltuni
1. Princess Senije of Albania
6. Salah Bey Toptani
3. Sadijé Toptani
7. Annijé Toptani

== Bibliography ==
- Christo Dako, Zog the First, King of the Albanians, Tirana, 1937.
- Josephine Dedet, Geraldine, Reine des Albanais, Paris, Criterion, 1997.
- Charles Fenyvesi, Splendor in exile, Washington, New Republic Books, 1979.
- Anastas Frashëri, Cila ka qënë N.M. Saj Sadije Zogu [Who was H.M .Queen Mother Sadije Zogu], Tirana, « Tirana », 1935.
- Patrice Najbor, Histoire de l’Albanie et de sa Maison Royale 1443-2007, 5 vol., Je Publie, 2008.
- Neil Rees, A Royal Exile - King Zog & Queen Geraldine of Albania in exile..., Studge Publications, 2010.
- Gwen Robyns, Geraldine of the Albanians, London, Muller, Blond & White limited, 1987
- Joseph Swire, Albania – The Rise of a Kingdom, New York, Arno Press & The New York Times, 1971.
- Jason Tomes, King Zog. Self-made Monarch of Albania, Sutton Publishing Limited, 2003.
- Tomes, Jason: King Zog: Self-Made Monarch of Albania
- Ingrid Sharp, Matthew Stibbe: Aftermaths of War: Women's Movements and Female Activists, 1918-1923
