= List of Albanian royal residences =

Albanian royal residences are palaces, castles, and villas associated with Albania’s historical royal families, most notably the Zogu family. Today, only the Tirana Royal Residence has been returned to the Albanian Royal Zogu Family and is maintained and used by them. But the other former royal properties are either owned by the Albanian state, repurposed for government and ceremonial use, or they have completely fallen into states of neglect and decay. Several Residences such as Burgajet Castle and the Royal Palace of Durrës, no longer survive in any standing form.

== List of Royal Residences in Albania ==
=== Royal Residence of the Albanian Monarchy (1271–1383) ===
Residence	Location	Occupant	Condition and present use	Ref
Durrës Castle	Durrës	Charles I of Anjou, Charles II of Naples, Philip I, Prince of Taranto, Robert, Prince of Taranto, John, Duke of Durazzo, Charles, Duke of Durazzo, Joanna, Duchess of Durazzo, Louis, Duke of Durazzo, Robert IV of Artois, Count of Eu	In the medieval period Durrës became the capital of the Kingdom of Albania and served as a Residence for the royal family as well as the administrative and political center of the kingdom. The castle’s fortification walls and towers remain standing in fragmented form, with portions of the original castle surviving at about one-third of their medieval extent. The site was damaged by earthquakes and has undergone partial consolidation, and the surviving walls now form a protected cultural monument and a historical attraction visited by tourists amid the urban landscape.	

=== Royal Residences of the Albanian Monarchy (20th century) ===
Residence	Location	Occupant	Condition and present use	Ref
Burgajet Castle	Burgajet	King Zog I	The castle was looted and set on fire in 1920 and subsequently fell into ruin. It was demolished in 1945. Today, the site is marked by several surviving marble stones from the original structure, but no standing remains survive.	
Royal Palace of Durrës	Durrës	Wilhelm, Prince of Albania	The palace was severely damaged during the bombardment of Durrës in 1918 and further destroyed by the 1926 earthquake. By 1930 there was no visible remains of the palace left. The foundations were excavated in the 2010s and were then removed in 2019 for the construction of the Veliera square.	
Tirana Royal Residence	Tirana	King Zog I, Leka, Crown Prince of Albania, Leka, Prince of Albania	The Royal Residence in Tirana was commissioned by King Zog I in 1929 and designed by the Austrian architect Kohler. It is located in central Tirana and serves as the primary residence of the Albanian Royal Family. The structure features preserved Italian mosaics and original flooring. It was returned to the Royal Family in 2006 by the State Lands Commission, and parts of the complex have been adapted for public and administrative use, such as a restaurant and office spaces.	
Royal Palace of Tirana	Tirana	King Zog I, Leka, Crown Prince of Albania	The palace remains standing and continues to function as the official residence for the President of Albania. Since 1946 it has been used for state receptions and official ceremonies, and in 2013 it resumed its residential function when the president and his family moved into a villa within the palace grounds.	
Royal Villa of Durrës	Durrës	King Zog I, Leka, Crown Prince of Albania	The villa was used by Italian and German occupation authorities during World War II and became a state guesthouse under communism. It was looted in 1997, which heavily degraded the interior. As of 2025, the structure remains standing but largely closed to the public, with a private restoration announced to return it to its original appearance.	
Royal Villa of Shiroka	Shirokë	King Zog I, Leka, Crown Prince of Albania	After World War II it was nationalized and used as a summer camp by state organizations. During the 1997 unrest it was looted and vandalized, and it fell into neglect. As of 2025 the structure remains standing but in a state of severe decay.	

== See also ==
- Lists of royal residences
- Mausoleum of the Albanian Royal Family
- King of Albania
- List of Albanian monarchs

== Bibliography ==
- Austin, Robert (2024). Royal Fraud. Central European University Press. ISBN 978-9-6338-6710-5.
- Fine, John V. A. (1994). The Late Medieval Balkans: A Critical Survey from the Late Twelfth Century to the Ottoman Conquest. University of Michigan Press. ISBN 978-0-4720-8260-5.
- Tomes, Jason (2003). King Zog Self-made Monarch of Albania. Sutton. ISBN 978-0-7509-3077-2.
- Schmitt, Oliver Jens; Fischer, Bernd J. (2022). A Concise History of Albania. Cambridge University Press. ISBN 978-1-1076-6218-6.
- Zavalani, Tajar (2015). History of Albania. Centre for Albanian Studies. ISBN 978-1-5075-9567-1.
