= Nafije Zogu =

Albanian princess

Princess Nafije Zogu
- Born: 1896; Burgajet Castle, Governorate of Mati, Ottoman Empire
- Died: 1955 (aged 58–59); Alexandria, Egypt
- Burial: Cairo Citadel
- Spouse: Ceno Kryeziu (m. 1922; died 1927)
- Issue: Prince Tati
- House: Zogu
- Father: Xhemal Pasha Zogu
- Mother: Sadije Toptani
- Religion: Islam

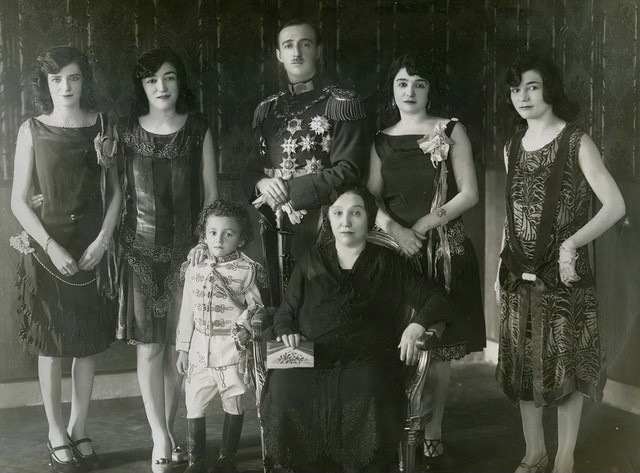
Members of the House of Zogu

Princess Nafije Zogu (1896–1955) was an Albanian princess.

== Life ==
She was the daughter of Xhemal Pasha Zogu and Sadijé Toptani, and was one the six sisters of King Zog I of Albania. She married Cena Bey Kryeziu, who was killed after a conflict with her brother in 1927. They had a son, Prince Tati.

When her brother became monarch in 1928, she and her siblings were granted the status of Prince and Princess Zogu. In contrast to the younger sisters of the king, the princesses Senije Zogu, Ruhije Zogu, Myzejen Zogu and Maxhide Zogu, who all played public roles and performed royal representational duties during the reign of king Zogu, the two elder sisters, Princess Adile Zogu and Nafije Zogu, lived a retired life in the royal household and did not have any public role. However, when the king banned the hijab in 1937, he made sure his sisters appeared in public without veils and dressed in Western fashion as role models for other women, and while Nafije did not appear in public, she did follow the policy of her brother and discarded her veil that year.

=== Exile ===
She left Albania with the rest of the royal family in 1939 upon the outbreak of World War II, and followed the former monarch in exile to Great Britain in 1940. She, as well as the rest of the sisters except Adile, followed Zog to Egypt in 1946. In 1955, she and the rest of the family followed Zog to France, where he died. She lived in France with her sisters until her death.
