= Maxhide Zogu =

Albanian princess and women's rights activist

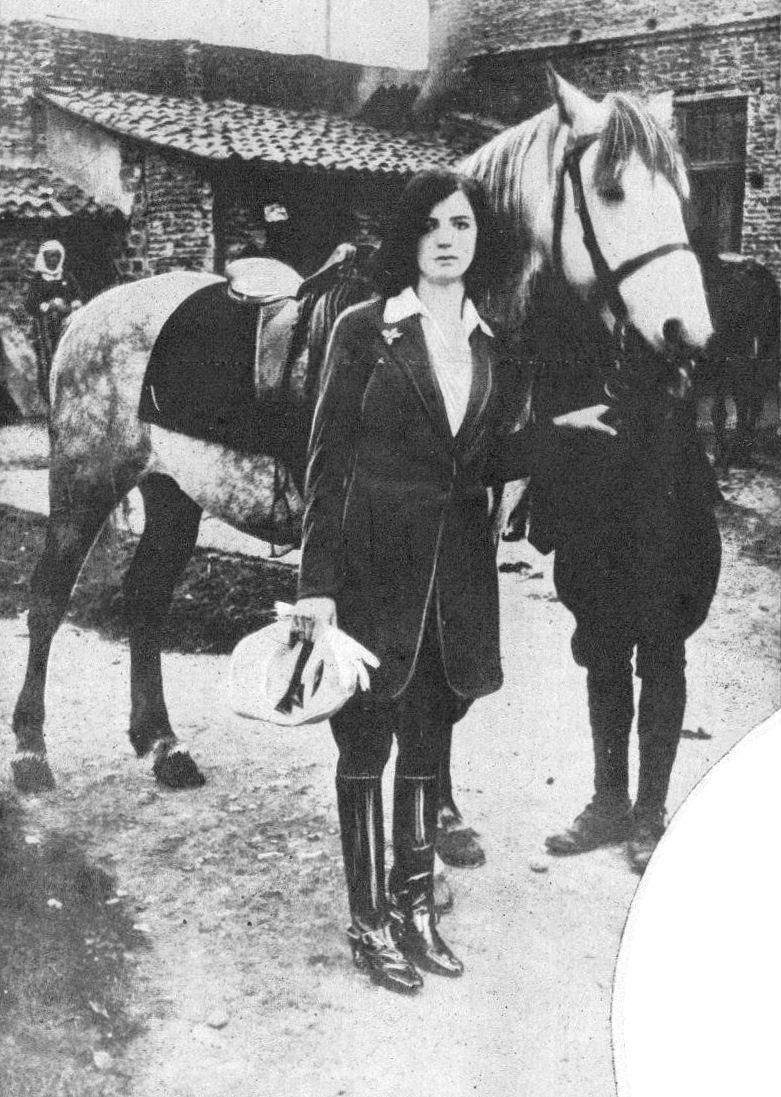
- Born: 1907; Burgajet Castle, Governorate of Mati, Ottoman Empire
- Died: 1969 (aged 61–62); Cannes, France
- House: Zogu
- Father: Xhemal Pasha Zogu
- Mother: Sadije Toptani
- Religion: Islam

Princess Maxhide Zogu (1907–1969), was an Albanian princess.

== Life ==
She was the daughter of Xhemal Pasha Zogu and Sadijé Toptani, and was one the six sisters of King Zog I of Albania. When her brother became monarch in 1928, she and her siblings were granted the status of Prince and Princess Zogu.

In contrast to his two eldest sisters, Princess Adile Zogu and Nafije Zogu, who was seldom seen in public, the king gave his four younger sisters official roles to play in the royal representation. During the first years of his reign, the princesses lived a traditional isolated life in the royal palace complex and seldom appeared outside of the family circle, but this changed by the time of the wedding of Princess Senije in 1936. From that year onward, the king regularly arranged formal royal balls, and had his four younger sisters appear in public on official royal representational assignments: Princess Senije was assigned tasks within health care, Ruhije Zogu education, Myzejen Zogu culture, and Maxhide Zogu attended to tasks within sports. To prepare them for this task, they were given lessons in piano playing, dance, language and riding, and were sent for several trips to Western Europe, where they became known for their expensive shopping trips. When the king banned the hijab in 1937, he made sure his sisters appeared in public without veils and dressed in Western fashion as role models for other women.

Prior to the royal wedding of the king in 1938, the three youngest princesses made a trip to the US, where they were given much attention.

=== Exile ===
She left Albania with the rest of the royal family in 1939 upon the outbreak of World War II, and followed the former monarch in exile to Great Britain in 1940. She, as well as the rest of the sisters except Adile, followed Zog to Egypt in 1946. In 1955, she and the rest of the family followed Zog to France, where he died. She lived in France with her sisters until her death.
