= Prince Xhelal Zogu =

Albanian prince

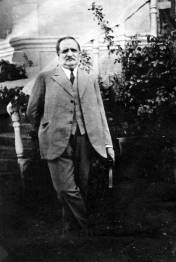
- Born: 14 May 1881; Castle Burgajet, Ottoman Empire
- Died: 26 February 1944 (aged 62); Istanbul, Turkey
- Spouse: Ruhije Doshishti (m. 1908; div. 1912) Ikbal Pekkini (m. 1931; died 1931) Faika Minxhalliu (m. 1932; div. 1933) Hyrijet Allaj (m. 1933)
- Issue: Said Zogu; Melek Zogu; Elvira Zogu; Skënder Zogu; Melite Zogu; Vera Zogu; Mirgin Zogu; Genc Zogu
- House: Zogu
- Father: Xhemal Pasha Zogu
- Mother: Zenja Malika Hanem

Prince Xhelal Zogu (born Xhelal bey Zogolli; 14 May 1881 – 26 February 1944) was scion of the House of Zogu, half-brother of Zog of Albania.

== Biography ==
He was born in Castle Burgajet to Xhemal Pasha Zogu (c. 1860–1911) and Zenja Malika Hanem (c.1860–1884). As Xhemal's eldest son, Zogu was expected to be selected over his half-brother Zog of Albania to lead the family and to inherit his hereditary responsibilities as Governor of Mati; however, for unknown reasons, he was passed over. Prince Xhelal's "Bey" title derives from the Turkish title applied to leaders or rulers during the Ottoman Empire with variations including Beyg, Begum, Bygjymi.

Prince Xhelal Bey Zogu was a lawyer. He was educated at the Darüşşafaka High School, Istanbul, and worked as State Attorney. His name comes up as the leading judge during the trial against Haxhi Qamili and other leaders of the Peasant Revolt in Albania during June 1915, arranged by the Serbian army.

He was elected three times to the Albanian Parliament, representing the Dibra Region, as his constituency, once; and twice the Kosovo Constituency, before becoming His Royal Highness, and subsequently retiring quietly from politics. He settled in Istanbul after the Italian Invasion.

== Family ==
Prince Zogu was married four times. First, he married Ruhijé Doshishti (daughter of Albanian aristocrats Salih Agolli Doshishti and wife Gylijé Allaj and sister of Princess Adile Zogu's husband) in 1908, who bore him a son, Said, who died in infancy, and a daughter, Melek, who died at birth. The couple divorced in 1912. Zogu then married Ikbal Pekkini (daughter of Izzet Bey Pekkini) in 1931, who bore him a daughter, Elvira, the same year. Ikbal died shortly after bearing her daughter. Her daughter survived to adulthood.

He married Faika Minxhalliu in 1932, who bore him a son, Prince Skënder Zogu, who survived to adulthood. However, the marriage to Faika dissolved and they divorced in 1933. In 1933 Zogu married Hyrijet Allaj (daughter of Emin Bey Allaj, Governor of Elbasan, and wife Ulkijé Binbashi) who bore him four children. Their two daughters, Melita and Vera, and older son, Mirgin, lived to adulthood. Their son Genc died at six in Turkey in 1944, the year of his father's death.

== Ancestry ==
8. Mahmud Pasha Zogolli, Governor of Mati
4. Xhelal Pasha Zogolli, Governor of Mati
2. Xhemal Pasha Zogu, Governor of Mati
5. Ruhije Alltuni
1. Prince Xhelal of Albania
3. Zenja Malika Hanem

== Bibliography ==
- Hugh Montgomery-Massingberd, editor, Burke's Royal Families of the World, Volume 1: Europe & Latin America (London, UK: Burke's Peerage Ltd, 1977).
- Patrice Najbor, Histoire de l'Albanie et de sa maison royale (5 volumes), JePublie, Paris, 2008, (ISBN 978-2-9532382-0-4).
- Patrice Najbor, la dynastye des Zogu, Textes & Prétextes, Paris, 2002
