= House of Zogu =

Royal family from Albania

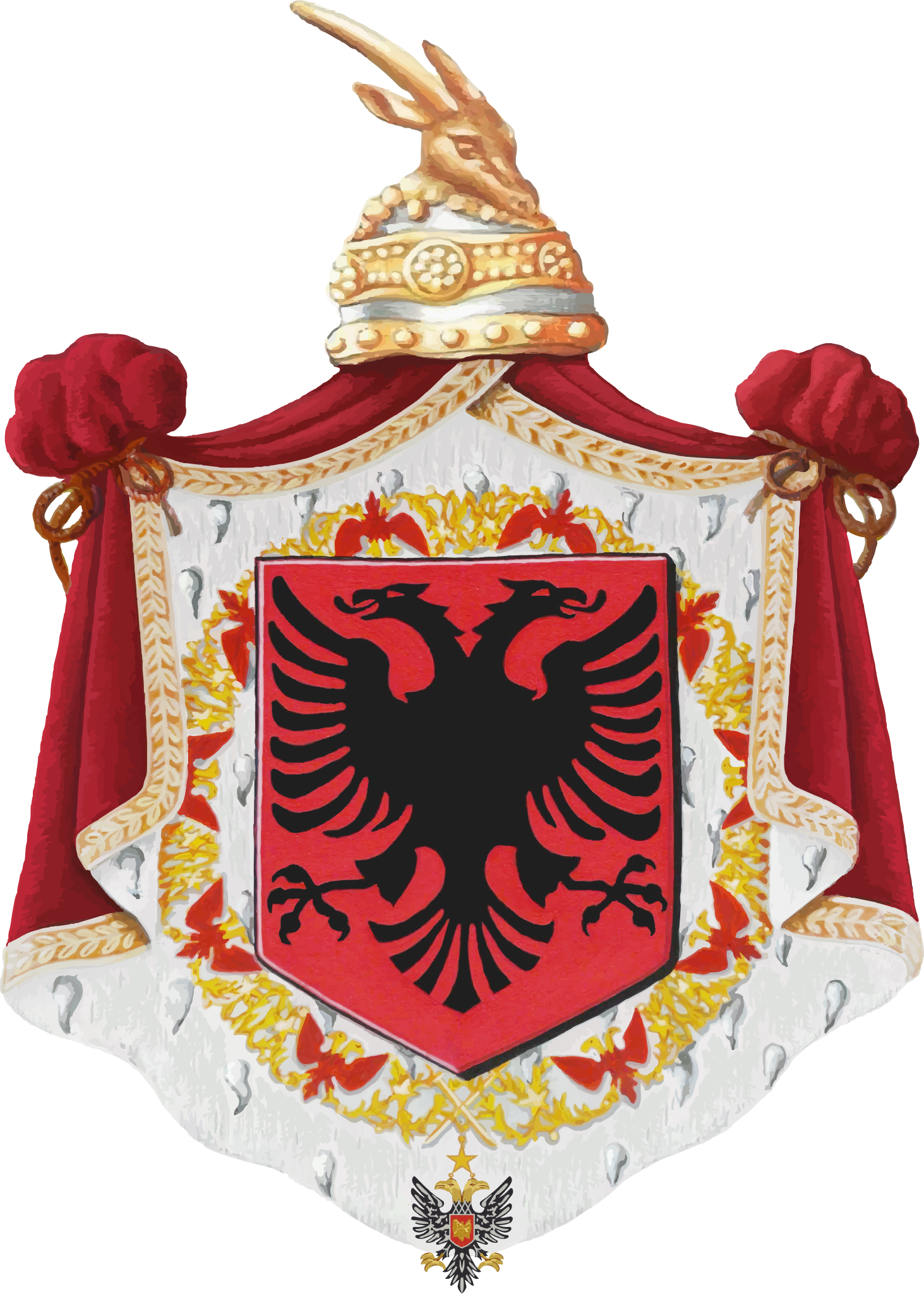
- Country: Kingdom of Albania
- Origin: Burgajet, Mat
- Founded: late 15th century
- Founder: Zogu Pasha (Zogu the Great)
- Current head: Crown Prince, Leka II
- Final ruler: King Zog I
- Titles: King of the Albanians; Hereditary Governor of Mati
- Motto: Atdheu mbi të gjitha (The homeland above all)
- Properties: Burgajet castle Royal Palace of Tirana; Royal Villa of Durrës; Royal Villa of Shkodër; Mausoleum of the Albanian Royal Family
- Deposition: 12 April, 1939
- Website: www.albanianroyalcourt.al

The House of Zogu, or Zogolli during Ottoman times and until 1922, is an Albanian dynastic family whose roots date back to the early 20th century. The family provided the first president and the short-lived modern Albanian Kingdom with its only monarch, King Zog I of the Albanians (1928–1939).

== History ==
The dynasty was founded by Zogu Pasha, who migrated to the region of Mat in north-central Albania during the late 15th century.

The Zogu family’s roots are tied to the Mati region of Albania, where they established prominence following the Ottoman conquest over four centuries ago. According to local legend, their rise began with a warrior from the village of Zogaj who intervened during a moment of crisis. An Ottoman official, Gazi Bey, sought to humiliate the families of Mati by demanding their unmarried daughters perform degrading acts. Outraged by this, the warrior from Zogaj rallied the people of Mati, leading a rebellion that ended with the defeat of Gazi Bey. In gratitude, a local chief offered the warrior his daughter’s hand in marriage, laying the foundation for the family’s legacy in Mati. The family name, “Zogolli,” reflects a blend of Albanian and Ottoman influences. It derives from the warrior’s village, Zogaj, with the addition of the Turkish suffix “-oglu,” meaning “son of.” This naming custom was typical under Ottoman rule. Another, less substantiated theory suggests a connection to a German crusader duke (Herzog) who settled in Mati and adopted the name "Zog," but this narrative is largely dismissed as speculative.

The most famous member of the dynasty is Zog I, who in 1928 proclaimed himself King of the Albanians and ruled until he was deposed by Victor Emmanuel III of Italy following the Italian invasion of 1939. Victor Emmanuel subsequently assumed the Albanian throne.

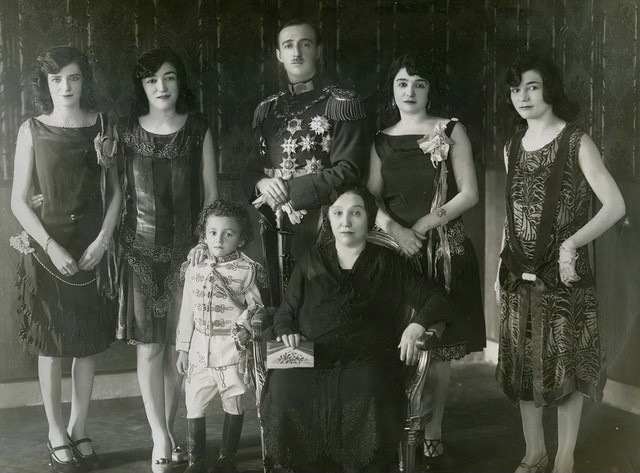
Members of the House of Zogu.

With the death in exile of King Zog in 1961, he was succeeded as claimant to the throne and head of the House of Zogu by his only son Leka, Crown Prince of Albania (born 1939), who was proclaimed King of the Albanians by the Albanian National Assembly in exile. Leka I remained head of the house and claimant to the throne until his death in 2011 when he was succeeded by his only son, Leka II.

Prince Leka II, grandson of King Zog I is currently the head of the royal house. He has one son, Aleksandër, who is the heir apparent to the defunct Albanian Throne.

== Family tree ==
- Zogu Pasha (Zogu the Great) late 15th century, converted to Islam and appointed as Governor of Seli-Mati by the Sultan of Turkey
  - Zogu the Small, Governor of Mati
    - 'Abdu'llah Bey Zogolli (ygst son) (k. in battle for independence, 1621, bur. Burgejet)
      - Ahmad Bey Zogolli (k. beheaded by the Turks at Ohrid, 1633) Governor of Mati
        - Mahmud Pasha Zogolli
          - Xhelal Pasha Zogolli, Hereditary Governor of Mati, married Ruhije Alltuni
            - Hedije Hanem (b. ca 1845, d. 1927), married Yusuf Bej Biçakçi (d. 1914), had issue, three sons and five daughters
            - Riza Bej Zogolli, Hereditary Governor of Mati (k. 1876)
              - Khairuddin Bey Zogolli
              - Liman Bey Zogolli
              - Khalid Bey Zogolli
                - Hasan Bej Zogolli (b. 1893, d. 1957)
                  - Moisi Zogolli (b. 1926), married Nazime Zogolli (b. 1934)
                    - Adrian Zogolli (b. 1961), married Diana (b. 1968)
                    - Hasan Zogolli (b. 1964), married Eldira (b. 1969)
                  - Khalid Zogolli (b. 1926), married Mybera (b. 1934)
                    - Erion Zogolli (b. 1974)
                    - Helga Zogolli (b. 1977)
                  - Bardhyl Zogolli (b. 1943), married Firdus (b. 1952)
                    - Irida Zogolli (b. 1976)
                    - Ledina Zogolli (b. 1981)
                    - Julinda Zogolli (b. 1989)
                  - Tefta Zogolli (b. 1926), married Petrut Dishnica
                    - Gojar (b. 1947), married Asime Dishnica
                    - Rebeka (b. 1957), married Ilir Verdha (b. 1955)
                  - Hamijet Zogolli (b. 1934), married Pertef Myftari (b. 1926)
                    - Ilir Myftari (b. 1951), married Diana (b. 1954)
                    - Gëzim Myftari (b. 1954), married Luljeta (b. 1955)
                    - Ahmet Myftari (b. 1963), married Alma (b. 1955)
                - Faik Zogolli
                  - Meri
                  - Yllka
                - Husain Bey Zogolli, married Nadira Çela
                  - Skender Kalaja Zogolli (b. 1949, d. 2001), married Shpresa Skendo (b. 1954)
                    - Beni Kalaja (b. 1972)
                    - Genti Kalaja (b. 1977)
                    - Denada Kalaja (b. 1980)
                  - Faik Zogolli (b. 1952)
                    - Fabien Zogolli
                    - Flona Zogolli
                  - Kati Zogolli
                  - Maja Zogolli
                - Khair ud-din Zogolli (d. 1945)
                  - Bukari Zogolli (b. 1941)
                    - Shpresa Zogolli
                    - Zudi Zogolli
                    - Ilir Zogolli
                    - Suhla Zogolli
                  - Enver Zogolli (b. 1942, d. 1971)
            - Zia Pasha Zogolli (b. 1858, d. 1931)
              - Fehim Ziya Bey Zoga (b. 1892, d. 1954), married Mukaddes Khanum (b. 1901, d. 1962)
                - Muammer Ergun Zoga (b. 1934), married Cansen Khanum (b. 1939)
                  - Yekta Fehim Burteçin Zoga (b. 1964), married Berrin Khanum (div. 1994)
                    - Cansen Zoga (b. 1989)
                  - Remziye Berna (b. 1959), married Mustafa Kizilay (b. 1958)
                    - Cinar Kizilay (b. 1985)
                    - Aylin Kizilay (b. 1990)
                  - Mukaddes Belqin (b. 1962), married Serhat Çaker (b. 1960)
                    - Cem Çaker (b. 1996)
                    - Selen Çaker (b. 1990)
                - Alpay Zoga (b. 1936, d. 1936)
                - Ertun Zoga (b. 1940, d. 1940)
                - Sabiha Khanum (b. 1918, d. 1983)
              - Omer Naïm Bey Burel (b. 1896, d. 1943), married Güzin Khanum (b. 1906, d. 1938)
                - Ziya Cemal Burel (b. 1932, d. 1983), married Hatice Günseli Burel (b. 1934)
                  - Özlem (b. 1964), married Yurdagül Çolakoglu (b. 1962)
                    - Saruca Çolakoglu (b. 1992)
                    - Bernis Çolakoglu (b. 1999)
                  - Güzin (b. 1966), married Mehmet Akyildiz (b. 1962)
                - Emel Burel (b. 1921, d. 1930)
                - Suzan Khanum (b. 1923, d. 1926)
                - Necla Khanum (b. 1925), married Servet Canset (b. 1917, d. 1986)
              - Nevin Khanum (b. 1918), married Turgut Bey Aybarakin (b. 1918, d. 1993)
                - Batu Aybarakin (b. 1946), married Yucel
                  - Birkan Aybarakin (b. 1983)
                - Bogatur Aybarakin (b. 1951), married Tulin (div. 2004)
                  - Burcu Aybarakin Alimli (b. 1980), married Ekrem Alimli
                - Belin (b. 1942, d. 1963), married Yuksel Özaydin (b. 1936, d. 1983)
                  - Bahadir Özaydin (b. 1969), married Bilge Özaydin
                  - Banu (b. 1964), married Fatih Tavman
                - Benek (b. 1949), married Sedat Toktamish (b. 1941, d. 1983)
                  - Burçin Toktamish (b. 1972), married Isik Guven Toktamish
                  - Benay (b. 1970), married F. A. Murat Haktanir
            - Xhemal Pasha Zogu (b. 1860, d. 1911), Hereditary Governor of Mati, married Zenja Malika Hanem then Sadije Toptani
              - Prince Xhelal Zogu (b. 1881, d. 1944), married Ruhije Doshishti, Ikbal Pekkini, Faika Minxhalliu and Hyrijet Allaj
                - Said Zogu (b. 1909, d. young)
                - Skënder Zogu (b. 1933), married Jacqueline Cosme
                  - Virginie Alexandra Geraldine Zogu (b. 1963), married Raphaël de Urresti (b. 1959)
                    - Florent de Urresti (b. 1989)
                    - Philippine de Urresti (b. 1990)
                - Mirgin Zogu (b. 1937), married Maryse Alexandrine Juliette Ferrando (b. 1934)
                  - Alexandre Zogu (b. 1963), married Emmanuelle (b. 1969)
                    - Erina Zogu (b. 1994)
                    - Anna Zogu (b. 1995)
                    - Flora Zogu (b. 1996)
                  - Michel Zogu (b. 1966)
                - Genc Zogu (b. 1938, d. 1944)
                - Malika (Melek) Zogu (b. 1911, d. young)
                - Elvira Zogu (b. 1932), married Ibrahim Hadidi (b. 1934, sep. 1986)
                  - Emin Hadidi (b. 1958)
                    - Heba Emin Hadidi (b. 1988)
                    - Mariam Emin Hadidi (b. 1993)
                  - Husain Hadidi (b. 1959)
                - Melite Zogu (b. 1934, d. 1958), married 'Abdu'l Aziz Khadr (b. 1927)
                  - Nermin Khadr (b. 1958), married Ismail Ramzy
                    - Ayten Ismail Ramzy (b. 1983)
                    - Farah Ismail Ramzy (b. 1988)
                  - Vera Khadr (b. 1964), married Mamdouh Mokhtar
                    - Muhammad Mamdouh Mokhtar (b. 1995)
                    - Farida Mamdouh Mokhtar (b. 1990)
                - Vera Zogu (b. 1936), married 1stly Ahmad Essawi Khadr (b. 1936, div. 1961), married 2ndly Nasser El Gueziri (d. 2000)
                  - Jalal Ahmad Khadr (b. 1956)
              - Unknown child
              - Princess Adile Zogu (b. 1890/1894, d. 1966), married Emin Bey Agolli-Doshishti (b. 1890, d. 1988)
                - Major Salih Doshishti (b. 1913, d. 1983)
                - Major Hussein Doshishti-Agolli (b. 1914, d. 1944), married Asma Çerçistopulli (b. 1926, d. 2004)
                  - Sermet Doshishti-Agolli (b. 1943), married 1stly Sylvia Gutjahr (div. 1975), married 2ndly Lauretta Lucille (b. 1956)
                    - Dominik Anatol Doshishti-Agolli (b. 1977)
                    - Konstantin Doshishti-Agolli (b. 1981), married Sarah Lablack
                  - Sevin Sadija Doshishti-Agolli (b. 1954), married John Patrick Kelly
                    - Devin Aidan Kelly (b. 1989)
                    - Erin Jale Kelly (b. 1981)
                - Sharaf ud-din Doshishti (b. 1921, d. 1990), married Helen Jordan (d. 2005)
                  - John Steven Doshishti
                - Princess Teri [Teri; Princess Teri Cooper] (b. 1923, d. 1994), married Robert Henry Cooper (b. 1922, d. 2001)
                  - William Jeremy Daniel Cooper (b. 1951), married Teresa Margaret Bamford
                    - Daniel Alexander Westrow Cooper (b. 1982)
                    - Richard Gregory Christopher Cooper (b. 1984)
                    - Samuel Robert Paul Cooper (b. 1988)
                  - Westrow Gerald Alan Cooper (b. 1956), married Helen Margaret Stokes
                    - George Westrow Alexander Cooper (b. 1991)
                    - Katherine Teri Helen Cooper (b. 1988)
                - Princess Danush [Danush; Mrs Doshishti Roudabush] (b. 1925, d. 1999), married Robert Martin Roudabush, Jr. (b. 1919, d. 2010)
                  - Robert M. Roudabush III (b. 1954), married Karen Tiderman Owens (b. 1954, div.), married 2ndly Joseph Gregory Owens
                  - John E. Roudabush (b. 1957)
                  - Teri Anne Roudabush Bennett (b. 1960), married Frank C. Bennett III
                    - John Edward Bennett (b. 1991)
                    - Philip Lindley Bennett (b. 1994)
                    - Samuel Robert Bennett (b. 2004)
              - King Zog I (Ahmet Muhtar Bey Zogolli; Skënderbeg III) (b. 1895, d. 1961), King of the Albanians, married Queen Geraldine of Albania (b. 1915, d. 2002)
                - Leka I (b. 1939, d. 2011), King of the Albanians, married Susan Barbara Cullen-Ward (b. 1941, d. 2004)
                  - Stillborn daughter (d. in Rhodesia)
                  - Leka II (b. 1982), Crown Prince of the Albanians, married 1stly Elia Zaharia (b. 1983, m. 2016, div. 2024), married 2ndly Blerta Celibashi (b. 1998, m. 2026)
                    - Princess Geraldine (b. 2020) (d/o Elia Zaharia)
                    - Prince Aleksandër (b. 2026) (s/o Blerta Celibashi)
              - Princess Nafise (Nafije) (b. 1900, d. 1955), married Colonel H.E. Hussein (Ceno) Bey Kryeziu (b. 1895, k. 1927)
                - Prince Tati Essad Murad Kryeziu, Prince of Kosovo (b. 1923, d. 1993), married Munira Khanum (b. 1921, d. 1970)
              - Unknown son
              - Princess Xenia (Senije) (b. 1908, d. 1969), married Prince Muhammad Abid Effendi (b. 1905, d. 1973, div. 1936), d.s.p.
              - Princess Muza Jan (Myzejen) (b. 1909, d. 1969), unmarried, d.s.p.
              - Princess Ruqiya (Ruhije) (b. 1910, d. 1948), unmarried, d.s.p.
              - Princess Majida (Maxhide) (b. 1911, d. 1970), unmarried, d.s.p.

== Bibliography ==
- Patrice Najbor, Histoire de l'Albanie et de sa maison royale (5 volumes), JePublie, Paris, 2008, (ISBN 978-2-9532382-0-4).
- Patrice Najbor, La dynastie des Zogu, Textes & Prétextes, Paris, 2002.

== See also ==
- King of Albania
- List of Albanian monarchs
- List of Albanian consorts
- List of Albanian royal residences
