= Burgajet =

- Village
- Location within Albania
- Coordinates: 41°38′10″N 20°03′55″E
- Country: Albania
- County: Dibër
- Municipality: Mat
- Administrative unit: Lis
- Elevation: 277 m (909 ft)

Population
  - Total: 1,000
- Time zone: UTC+1 (CET)
  - Summer (DST): UTC+2 (CEST)
- Postal Code: 8002
- Area Code: 0287

Burgajet is a village in the former Municipality of Lis, central Albania. At the 2015 local government reform it became part of the municipality Mat. Burgajet is notable for the Albanian royal family, which traces its origin to King Zog, born in Burgajet Castle.

== Notable people ==
- King Zog of Albania was born in Burgajet.
- Xhelal Bey Zogu
