= Xhemal Pasha Zogu =

- Hereditary Governor of Mati
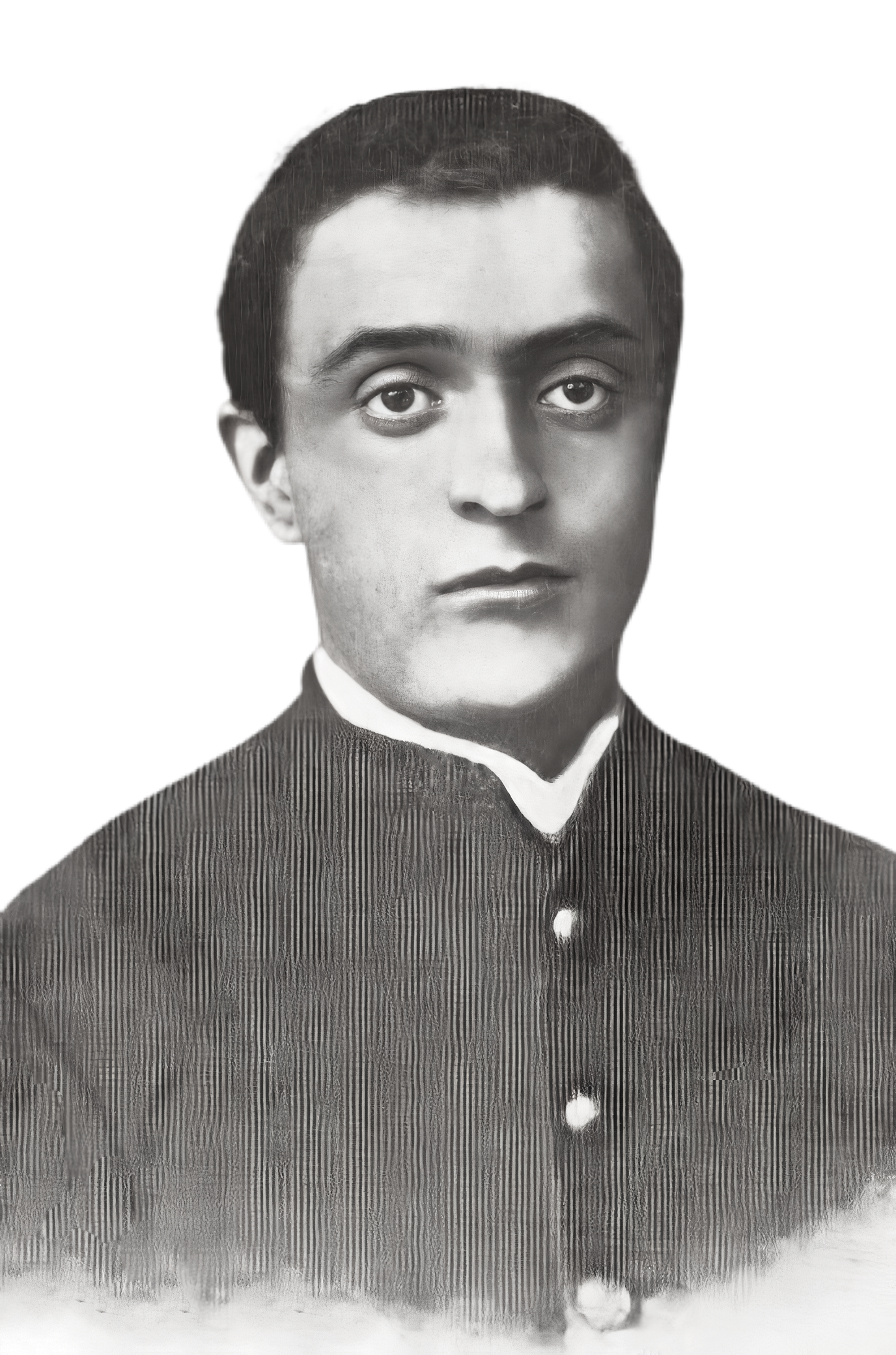
- Born: 1860; Burgajet Castle, Ottoman Empire
- Died: 1911 (aged 50–51); Burgajet Castle, Ottoman Empire
- Burial: Burgajet Castle, Albania
- Spouse: Zenja Malika Hanem (m. 1880; died 1884) Sadije Hanem (m. 1887)
- Issue: Prince Xhelal Zogu; Stillbirth child Princess Adile; Zog I, King of Albania; Princess Nafije; Unnamed son Senije, Princess Abid of Ottoman Empire; Princess Myzejen; Princess Ruhije; Princess Maxhide
- House: Zogu
- Father: Xhelal Pasha Zogolli
- Mother: Ruhije Hanem
- Religion: Islam

Xhemal Pasha Zogu ([dʒɛ'mal pa'ʃa 'zɔɡu]; 1860–1911), also known as Jamal Pasha or Jamal Pasha Zogolli, was the Hereditary Governor of Mati, Albania (at the time part of the Ottoman Empire). He was the father of King Zog I of Albania.

Born at Burgajet Castle, Mati (or Constantinople), in 1860, he was the third son of Xhelal Pasha Zogolli and Ruhije Alltuni, from the wealthy Alltuni family of Kavajë. He was educated privately and became Hereditary Governor of Mati upon the death of his older brother, Riza.

During the Great Eastern Crisis, a meeting held in Debar (1880) by Albanian notables deciding on the course of action regarding the Ottoman cessation of Ulcinj to Montenegro, Xhemal was in the pro-government group advocating no action be taken and was against a declaration of Albanian autonomy in the Balkans.

Xhemal married Zenja Malika Khanum (Melek Hanem) (Castle Burgajet, Mati, c. 1860 - Castle Burgajet, Mati, 1884), his first cousin, in Mati in 1880; after she died in childbirth in 1884 he married Sadiya Khanum (Sadijé Hanem) in Mati in 1887. Her title was later changed to Nëna Mbretëreshë i Shqiptarëvet ("Queen Mother of the Albanians").

He became involved in an insurrection against the Ottomans planned for June 1903, which did not take place.

== Issue ==
By Zenja Malika Hanem, Xhemal had a son and a stillbirth child

- Prince Xhelal Zogu (1881-1944). Politician. He married four times and had four sons and four daughters.
- Stillbirth child (1884). The mother died in childbirth also.

By Sadije Toptani, Xhemal had two sons and six daughters:

- Princess Adile (1890-1966). She married once and had three sons and two daughters.
- King Zog I (1895-1961). King of Albania.
- Princess Nafije (1896-1955). She married once and had a son.
- A son who died in young age.
- Princess Senije (1903-1969). She married Şehzade Mehmed Abid and became a princess of Ottoman Empire.
- Princess Myzejen (1905-1969). Unmarried, without issue.
- Princess Ruhije (1906-1948). Unmarried, without issue.
- Princess Maxhide (1907-1969). Unmarried, without issue.

Regnal titles
| Preceded by Riza Zogolli | Hereditary Governor of Mati ?–1911 | Succeeded by Ahmet Zogu |

== Bibliography ==
- Patrice Najbor, Histoire de l'Albanie et de sa maison royale (5 volumes), JePublie, Paris, 2008, (ISBN 978-2-9532382-0-4).
- Patrice Najbor, la dynastye des Zogu, Textes & Prétextes, Paris, 2002
