= Saliha Naciye Kadın =

Consort of Ottoman Sultan Abdul Hamid II (1887 – 1923)

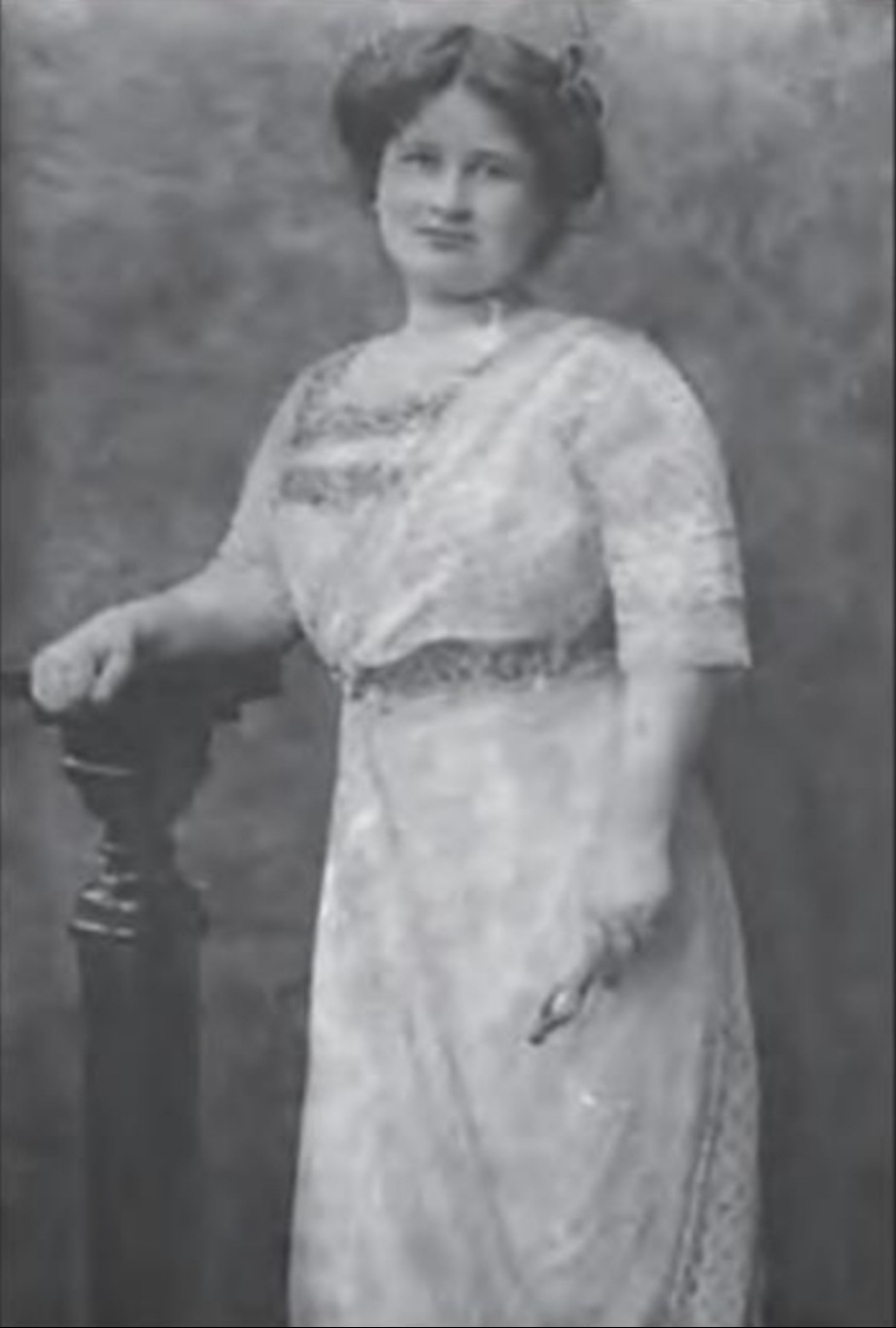
- Born: Zeliha Hanım Ankuap c. 1887; Batumi, Caucasus Viceroyalty, Russian Empire (now Batumi, Adjara, Georgia)
- Died: c. 1923 (aged 35–36); Serencebey Mansion, Istanbul, Turkey
- Burial: Mahmud II Mausoleum, Divanyolu, Istanbul
- Spouse: Abdul Hamid II (m. 1904; died 1918)
- Issue: Şehzade Mehmed Abid; Samiye Sultan
Names
- Turkish: Zeliha Saliha Atike Naciye Kadın; Ottoman Turkish: صالحه عتیقه ناجیه قادین
- House: Ankuap (by birth); Ottoman (by marriage)
- Father: Arslan Bey Ankuap
- Religion: Sunni Islam

Saliha Naciye Kadın (Ottoman Turkish: صالحه ناجیه قادین, "the devout one" and "saved and freed"; born Zeliha Ankuap; c. 1887 – c. 1923) was the last consort of Sultan Abdul Hamid II of the Ottoman Empire.

== Early life ==
Of Abkhazian origin, Saliha Naciye Kadın was born in 1887. Born as Zeliha Ankuap, she was the daughter of Aslan Bey Ankuap. In 1901, Kabasakal Mehmed Pasha presented her for service in the Yıldız Palace, where her name according to the custom of the Ottoman court was changed to Saliha Naciye.

== Marriage ==
Three years into service, Abdul Hamid took notice of Saliha Naciye, and they married on 4 November 1904 in the Yıldız Palace. She was 17 years old, and he was 62. She was his thirteenth and last consort. She was given the title of "Sixth Ikbal". She was very sweet, gentle and modest, characteristics appreciated by the sultan. A year after the marriage, on 17 May 1905, she gave birth to her first child, a son, Şehzade Mehmed Abid, and three years later on 16 January 1908 to her second child, a daughter, Samiye Sultan, who died on 24 January 1909. After her daughter birth, she was given the honorary rank of "Fifth Kadın", with the title Saliha Naciye Kadın. Saliha Naciye was by far the favorite consort of Abdülhamid II, followed by Müşfika Kadın and Pesend Hanım.

In the 1909 mutiny, Kabasakal ("twisted beard") was shaved and publicly hanged, and on 27 April 1909, Abdul Hamid was deposed, and sent into exile in Thessaloniki. Naciye was close to him, and so she and her son Abid accompanied him. But after Thessaloniki fell to Greece in 1912, Abdülhamid returned to Istanbul and settled in the Beylerbeyi Palace, where he died in 1918. Saliha Naciye refused to abandon Abdülhamid and, together with Müşfika Kadın, demanded to stay with him in Beylerbeyi Palace until his death. Pesend Hanım, on the other hand, was unable to obtain permission and therefore never saw her husband again, suffering greatly from this, so much so that she shaved her head as a sign of mourning at his death.

== Last years and death ==
After Abdul Hamid's death, Saliha Naciye settled in the mansion of Şehzade Mehmed Selim located in Serencebey.

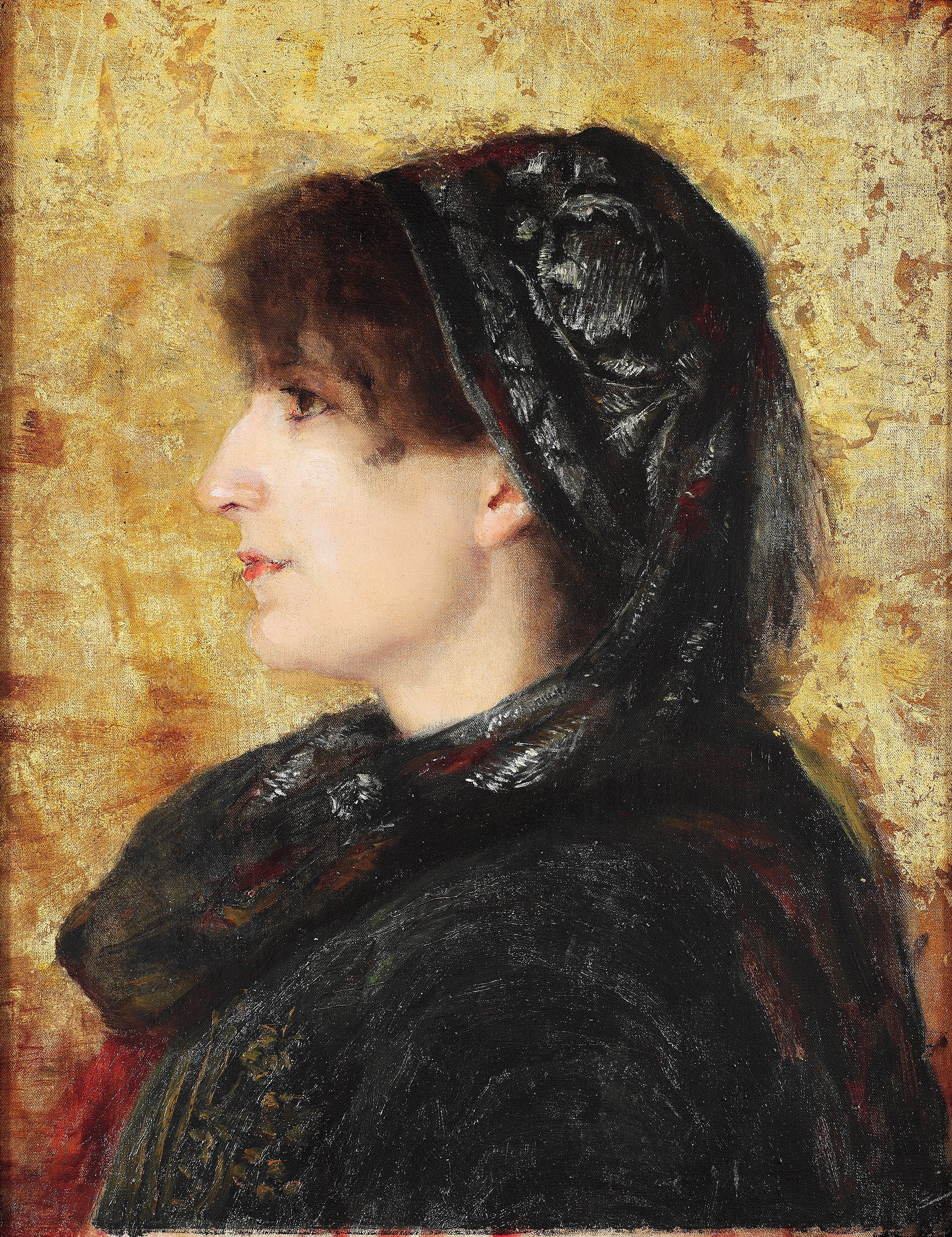
Portrait of Naile Hanim (1910) by Osman Hamdi Bey

She died in 1923, and was buried in the mausoleum of Sultan Mahmud II, located at Divan Yolu street.

== Issue ==
Name	Birth	Death	Notes
Şehzade Mehmed Abid	17 May 1905	8 December 1973	married twice without issue
Samiye Sultan	16 January 1908	24 January 1909	born and died in Yıldız Palace; she died because of pneumonia and was buried in Yahya Efendi Cemetery

== In literature and popular culture ==
- Saliha Naciye Kadın is a character in Tim Symonds' historical novel Sherlock Holmes and The Sword of Osman (2015).
- In the 2017 TV series Payitaht: Abdülhamid, Saliha Naciye Kadın is portrayed by Turkish actress Vildan Atasever.

== See also ==
- Ikbal (title)
- Ottoman Imperial Harem
- List of consorts of the Ottoman sultans

== Annotations ==
1. She is also called Atike Naciye.

== Sources ==
- Brookes, Douglas Scott (2010). The Concubine, the Princess, and the Teacher: Voices from the Ottoman Harem. University of Texas Press. ISBN 978-0-292-78335-5.
- Osmanoğlu, Ayşe (2000). Babam Sultan Abdülhamid. Mona Kitap Yayinlari. ISBN 978-6-050-81202-2.
- Sakaoğlu, Necdet (2008). Bu Mülkün Kadın Sultanları: Vâlide Sultanlar, Hâtunlar, Hasekiler, Kandınefendiler, Sultanefendiler. Oğlak Yayıncılık. ISBN 978-6-051-71079-2.
- Uluçay, M. Çağatay (2011). Padişahların kadınları ve kızları. Ötüken. ISBN 978-9-754-37840-5.
