= Şehzade Mehmed Abid =

Ottoman prince, son of Sultan Abdul Hamid II (1905–1973)

- Born: 17 May 1905; Yıldız Palace, Constantinople, Ottoman Empire (present day Istanbul, Turkey)
- Died: 8 December 1973 (aged 68); Beirut, Lebanon
- Burial: Cemetery of the Sulaymaniyya Takiyya, Damascus, Syria
- Spouse: Pınarıdil Fahriye Hanım (died 1934) Princess Senije Zogu (m. 1936; div. 1949)
Names
- Turkish: Şehzade Mehmed Abid; Ottoman Turkish: شہزادہ محمد عابد
- Dynasty: Ottoman
- Father: Abdul Hamid II
- Mother: Saliha Naciye Kadın
- Religion: Sunni Islam
- Military career
- Allegiance: Ottoman Empire
- Branch: Ottoman Army
- Rank: See list

Şehzade Mehmed Abid Efendi (Ottoman Turkish: شهزادہ محمد عابد; 17 May 1905 – 8 December 1973) was an Ottoman prince, a son of Sultan Abdul Hamid II and Saliha Naciye Kadın, and brother-in-law of King Zog I of Albania.

== Early years ==
Şehzade Mehmed Abid was born on 17 May 1905 in the Yıldız Palace. His father was Abdul Hamid II, son of Abdulmejid I and Tirimüjgan Kadın. His mother was Saliha Naciye Kadın, daughter of Arslan Bey Ankuap. He was the eighth son born to his father, and the eldest child of his mother. He had a sister, Samiye Sultan three years younger than him, who died in infancy. He was named after Abdul Hamid's decreased brother, who had died in infancy.

On 27 April 1909, Abdul Hamid was deposed, and sent into exile in Thessaloniki. Abid and his mother followed Abdul Hamid. There they lived in Alatini Mansion. After Thessaloniki fell to Greece in 1912, Abdul Hamid returned to Istanbul, and settled in the Beylerbeyi Palace. His circumcision took place on 9 October 1913. Abdul Hamid died in 1918, when Abid was thirteen years of age.

Abid's early education took place in Galatasaray High School. He was taught painting by Halil Pasha, and his history tutor was Tevfik Bey. After graduating, he was enrolled in the Ottoman Military College, and went on to become senior lieutenant in the imperial Ottoman Army. He also served aide-de-camp to Sultan Mehmed VI. His mother died in 1923, when he was nineteen years of age.

Between 1918 and 1922, Abid lived in the Yıldız Palace, and between 1922 and 1924, he lived in the Erenköy Palace.

== Exile ==
Upon the exile of the imperial family in March 1924, Abid first asked to go to Egypt but was denied entry, so he settled in Beirut, Lebanon. He used to spend most of his time in Jounieh with his eldest brother Şehzade Mehmed Selim, and the summers in Aley. He then went to Paris, where he stayed with his older sister, Ayşe Sultan. Here he earned his living as a soap seller. On 14 January 1925, he gave the power of attorney to Sami Günzberg, a well-known Turkish Jewish lawyer, authorising him to regain from usurpers buildings, lands, mines, concessions left by Abdul Hamid situated in Turkish territory and elsewhere.

In Paris, he went to the Sorbonne Law School, and the Faculty of Political Sciences from where he graduated in 1936 and 1937 respectively. He received his doctorate in law from Sorbonne. He also went to Ecole Nationale des Langues Orientales Vivantes, where he graduated in Persian Language and Literature. Between 1940 and 1948, he lived for short periods in Toulouse, Nice, Madrid, Lisbon, Cairo, Alexandria and Tirana. The Japanese emperor considered him a candidate for the throne of Turkistan; Zog I of Albania also thought of making him Crown Prince, as at the moment he had no issue. Between 1936 and 1939, King Zog I of Albania, appointed him the Albanian Ambassador to France.

== Personal life ==
In 1930, Abid asked Abdulmejid II and Mehisti Hanım's daughter, Dürrüşehvar Sultan's hand in marriage. However, her father refused, on the grounds of Dürrüşehvar being under age. In reality, he had already arranged her marriage with Azam Jah, a very wealthy Indian prince, son of the Nizam of Hyderabad, Mir Osman Ali Khan. The two married in 1931. In 1934, after the death of his first consort, his marriage was arranged to Mihrişah Sultan, daughter of Şehzade Yusuf Izzeddin and Leman Hanım, but she was in love with Şehzade Ömer Faruk, who later became her husband, and then he asked to marry a daughter of Nizam of Hyderabad State, because his two sons were already married to two Ottoman princesses, Dürrüşehvar Sultan and Nilüfer Hanimsultan. However, none of them materialised.

Abid's first wife was Pınardil Fahriye Hanım. She died in 1934 in Nice, France, and was buried in Muslim Bobigny Cemetery. His second wife was Princess Senije Zogu, daughter of Xhemal Pasha Zogu and Sadije Toptani, and sister of King Zog I. They were betrothed on 9 January 1936 in Tirana, and were married on 13 January 1936. They divorced in 1949.

== Death ==
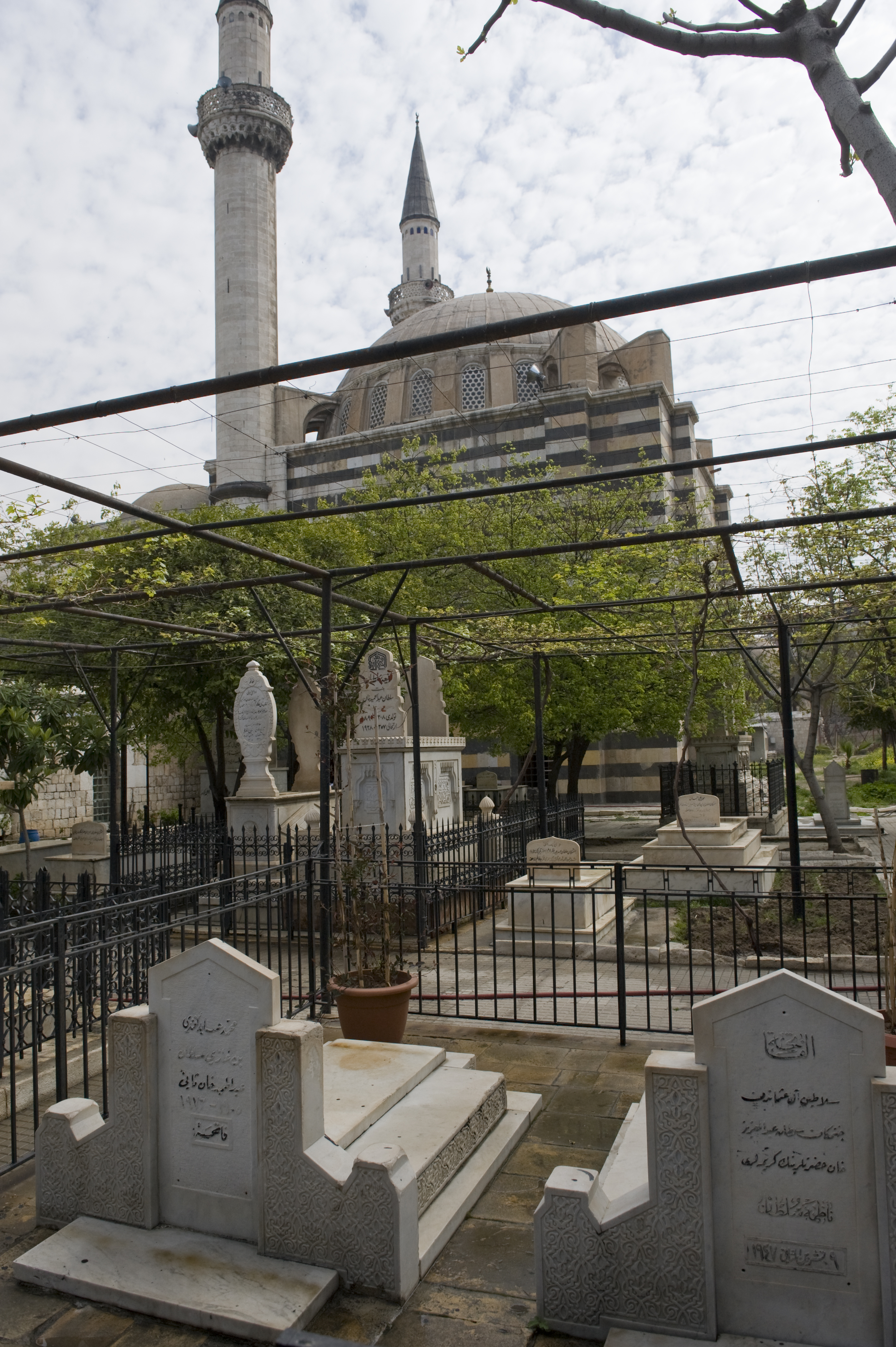
The grave of Mehmed Abid (left)

In 1966, Mehmed Abid settled in Beirut, where he died of heart attack on 8 December 1973 and was buried in the cemetery of the Sulaymaniyya Takiyya, Damascus, Syria.

== Personality ==
Abid was described as modest, smart, cultured and interested in history. In his last days he used to spend his time in libraries and bookstores. He could speak Turkish, French, Arabic and Persian. He received many offers to write down memories about his father, however, he generally turned down journalists. He would generally refuse the journalists requests to meet him.

== Honours ==
Styles of Şehzade Mehmed Abid
- Reference style: His Imperial Highness
- Spoken style: Your Imperial Highness

Foreign honours

- Albania: Grand Cross of the Order of Fidelity of the Kingdom of Albania, 1936

=== Military ranks and army appointments ===
- Senior Lieutenant, Ottoman Army

=== Honorary appointments ===
- Aide-de-Camp to the Sultan

== In literature ==
- Şehzade Mehmed Abid is a character in Tim Symonds' historical novel Sherlock Holmes and The Sword of Osman (2015).
