= Sadije Toptani =

- Queen Mother of Albania
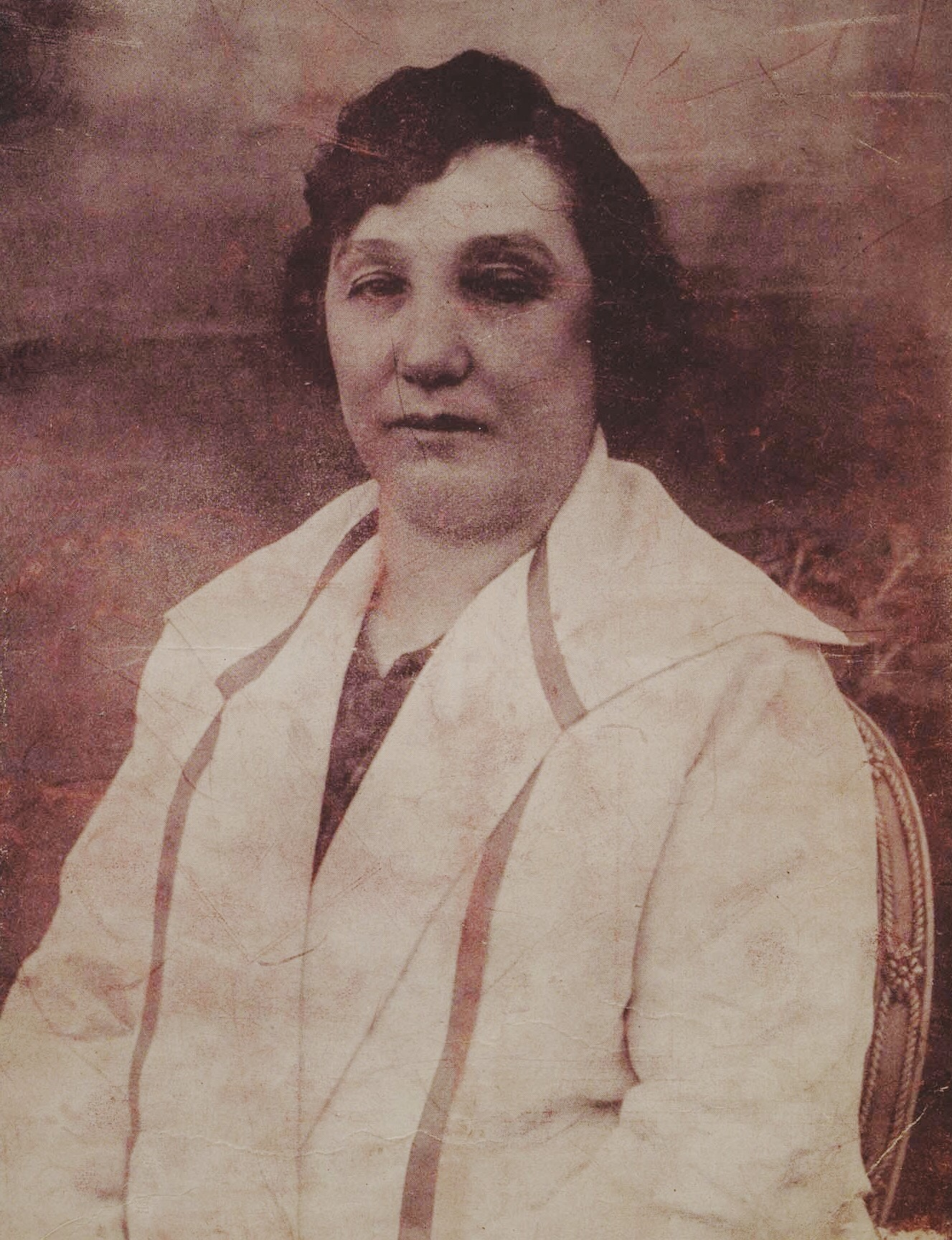
- Born: 28 August 1876; Tirana, Ottoman Empire (modern Albania)
- Died: 25 November 1934 (aged 58); Durrës, Albanian Kingdom
- Burial: Mausoleum of the Albanian Royal Family
- Spouse: Xhemal Pasha Zogu
- Issue: Princess Adile; Zog I, King of Albania; Princess Nafije; A son Senije, Princess of Ottoman Empire; Princess Myzejen; Princess Ruhije; Princess Maxhide
Names
- Hanëm Sadije Toptani Zogu
- House: Toptani (by birth); Zogu (by marriage)
- Father: Salah Bey Toptani
- Mother: Annijé Hanem Toptani
- Religion: Islam

Sadije Toptani (Tirana, 28 August 1876 – Durrës, 25 November 1934) was queen mother of Albania from September 1928 until her death. She was the mother of Zog I of Albania.

== Biography ==
Sadije (also spelled Sadijé, Sadiya or Khadija) was a member of the Toptani family. She was the daughter of Salah Bey Toptani (1843−1910) and his wife, Annijé Hanem Toptani (1855−1899), both members by birth of the Toptani family. She was also a cousin Essad Pasha Toptani. Toptani was the second wife of Xhemal Pasha Zogu after the death of his first wife, Zenja Melika Hanem.

Toptani was a Bektashi Muslim.

Toptani died in the Royal Compound in Durrës. and was buried in Tirana the next day. A royal mausoleum was constructed to house her remains. The building was destroyed by Albanian communist forces on 17 November 1944.

== Issue ==
Name	Birth	Death	Spouse	Children
Princess Adile Zogu	25 February 1893	6 February 1966	Major Emin Bey Agolli-Doshishti	Prince Salih; Prince Hysen; Prince Sharafidin; Princess Teri; Princess Danush
King Zog I of the Albanians	8 October 1895	9 April 1961	Countess Geraldine Apponyi de Nagyappony	Crown Prince Leka
Princess Nafije Zogu	25 October 1896	21 March 1955	Ceno Bey Kryeziu	Prince Tati, Prince of Kosovo
A son		died in infancy		
Princess Senije Zogu	15 November 1903	15 April 1969	Prince Mehmed Abid of Turkey	None
Princess Myzejen Zogu	6 February 1905	10 April 1969	Never married	None
Princess Ruhije Zogu	20 March 1906	31 January 1948	Never married	None
Princess Maxhide Zogu	20 March 1907	4 January 1969	Never married	None

== Bibliography ==
- Patrice Najbor, Histoire de l'Albanie et de sa maison royale (5 volumes), JePublie, Paris, 2008, (ISBN 978-2-9532382-0-4).
- Patrice Najbor, la dynastye des Zogu, Textes & Prétextes, Paris, 2002
- O.S. Pearson, Albania and King Zog, I.B. Tauris. 2005 (ISBN 1845110137).
