= Rukaj =

- Administrative unit
- Location within Albania
- Coordinates: 41°39′N 20°3′E
- Country: Albania
- County: Dibër
- Municipality: Mat

Population (2011)
  - Administrative unit: 2,507
- Time zone: UTC+1 (CET)
  - Summer (DST): UTC+2 (CEST)

Rukaj is a village and a former municipality in the Dibër County, northern Albania. At the 2015 local government reform it became a subdivision of the municipality Mat. The population at the 2011 census was 2,507.
