= Adile Zogu =

Albanian princess (1894–1966)

Princess Adile Zogu
- Born: 9 April 1890; Burgajet Castle, Governorate of Mati, Ottoman Empire
- Died: 6 February 1966 (aged 75); Paris, France
- Burial: Thiais Cemetery
- Spouse: Emin Bey Agolli Doshishti (m. 1909)
- Issue: Prince Salih; Prince Hysein; Prince Sherafedin; Princess Teri; Princess Danush
- House: Zogu
- Father: Xhemal Pasha Zogu
- Mother: Sadije Toptani
- Religion: Islam

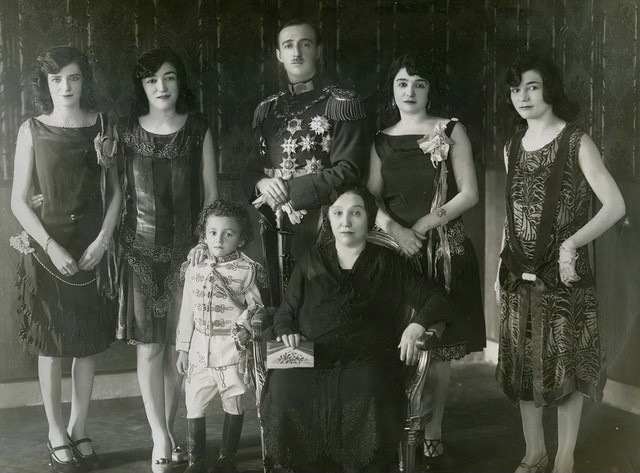

Princess Adile Zogu (1890–1966) was an Albanian princess. She was the eldest sister of Zog I of Albania.

== Birth ==
Like all of Zog I's sisters, there is a degree of confusion regarding Adile's date of birth. Over the duration of the Zogist monarchy, Zog's three youngest sisters, Myzejen, Ruhije and Maxhide (all of them unmarried) became very coy about their ages. As they grew older, their 'official' dates of birth were advanced forwards, and those of Adile and Nafije were similarly adjusted to prevent a suspicious age-gap. The death of their father, Xhemal Pasha Zogu, was advanced forward at around the same time. Adile was eventually said to have been born in 1894, though 1890–91 is a more likely date. Her gravestone bears the date 1890.

== Marriage and later life ==
Adile (Adila) was married in 1909 to Major Emin Bey Agolli Doshishti (1890–1988). He hailed from a prominent family which owned substantial properties near Lake Ohrid (his parents were Albanian aristocrats Salih Agolli Doshishti and wife Gylijé Allaj). The marriage had probably been arranged years in advance by her mother. The couple had five children. They separated in c. 1925, though never officially divorced. Adile ran the household where she and her sisters (together with the Queen Mother prior to 1934) lived, as the younger princesses had little knowledge of domestic management. She was absent for long periods during the early days of the Albanian Kingdom after she and her youngest daughter Danush contracted tuberculosis. They spent several years at a sanitarium in Switzerland before eventually recovering and returning to Albania.

After the overthrow of the monarchy in the 1939 Italian invasion of Albania, Adile accompanied Zog to England. After his departure to Egypt, she stayed behind and settled in Henley-on-Thames with her two daughters (who were English-educated) and her sister-in-law, Princess Ruhije Xhelal Zogolli (1881–1956, who was also the first wife of Xhelal Zogu, Adile's elder paternal half-brother). In the late 1950s, she rejoined her surviving siblings in France. After Zog's death in 1961, she lived in Paris with her eldest son, Salih, until her own death in 1966.

== Issue ==
Name	Birth	Death	Spouse	Children
Prince Salih	1913	1983	Never married	None
Prince Hysein	1914	?	Asma Çerçistopalli	Sermet Doshishti-Agolli; Sevin Sadija Doshishti-Agolli
Prince Sherafedin	26 May 1921	June 1965	Helen Jordan	John Steven Doshishti
Princess Teri	10 September 1923	October 2001	Robert Henry Cooper	William Jeremy Daniel Cooper; Westrow Gerald Alan Cooper
Princess Danush	29 July 1925	11 October 1999	Robert Martin Roudabush, Jr	Robert M. Roudabush III; John E. Roudabush; Teri Anne Roudabush Bennett

== Honours ==
- Dame Grand Cross of the Order of Fidelity (Kingdom of Albania).

== Ancestry ==
8. Mahmud Pasha Zogolli, Governor of Mati
4. Xhelal Pasha Zogolli, Governor of Mati
2. Xhemal Pasha Zogu, Governor of Mati
5. Ruhijé Alltuni
1. Princess Adile of Albania
6. Salah Bey Toptani
3. Sadijé Toptani
7. Annijé Toptani
