= Riza Zogolli =

Riza Bey Zogolli
- Hereditary Governor of Mati
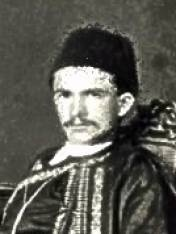
- Died: 1876
- Issue: Khairuddin Bey Zogolli; Liman Bey Zogolli; Khalid Bey Zogolli
- House: House of Zogu
- Father: Xhelal Pasha Zogolli

Riza Zogolli was a 19th-century Albanian politician. He was the brother of Xhemal Pasha Zogolli (and therefore uncle to King Zog I of Albania), and one of the promoters and delegates of the Albanian Declaration of Independence.

A leading Albanian Nationalist, a founder and Secretary of the League of Prizren.

== Bibliography ==
- Patrice Najbor, Histoire de l'Albanie et de sa maison royale (5 volumes), JePublie, Paris, 2008, (ISBN 978-2-9532382-0-4).
- Patrice Najbor, la dynastye des Zogu, Textes & Prétextes, Paris, 2002
