= Albanian Red Cross =

Humanitarian non-governmental organization in Albania

- Kryqi i Kuq Shqiptar
- Formation: 4 October 1921; 104 years ago
- Purpose: Humanitarian Aid
- Headquarters: Tirana, Albania
- Region served: Albania
- President: Ylli Alushi
- Main organ: General Assembly
- Revenue: 185,910,992 ALL (2014)
- Staff: 47 (2013)
- Volunteers: 2,737 (2013)
- Website: www.kksh.org.al

The Albanian Red Cross (Albanian: Kryqi i Kuq Shqiptar, KKSH), or ARC, is the national society member of the International Federation of Red Cross and Red Crescent Societies for Albania. The oldest humanitarian organization in Albania, it was founded on October 4, 1921, and was officially recognized by the Red Cross and Red Crescent Movement in 1923. Its headquarters are located in the Albanian capital of Tirana, and its 39 branches provide humanitarian assistance across the country in accordance with the Fundamental Principles.

== History ==
=== Foundation ===
The first activity of the Red Cross Movement in Albania was in 1920, when aid from the American Red Cross was distributed at the rear of the Albanian Army. On October 4, 1921, the Albanian Red Cross Society was founded and the organization's first statutes were accepted in 1922. In its first year, it began publishing a magazine, took over the operations of an orphanage, and assisted refugees from the surrounding region. In 1923, the International Committee of the Red Cross officially recognized the Albanian Red Cross, making it the 38th national society.

=== 1920s – 1940s ===
Throughout the second half of the 1920s and the 1930s, the Albanian Red Cross expanded its coverage across Albania. It opened a nursing school, training nurses to serve the poorest and most vulnerable of the population. With the French Red Cross, it established counseling and milk distribution programs for undernourished children. During this period, the organization's activities were funded by charitable donations from the Albanian people, with significant support coming from the Albanian diaspora, particularly from the United States.

During World War II, the main activities of the Albanian Red Cross was at the Greco-Italian War front. It established and operated a field hospital at the front, and also opened an office to assist displaced populations in searching for missing family members. In the immediate post-war years, the Albanian Red Cross distributed food, clothing, and cash to those struggling to rebuild. Shelters were set up in major cities for the elderly.

As the new Communist government began its socialist reconstruction of the country, the activities of the Albanian Red Cross adapted to fit this new direction. The late 1940s were a period of rapid industrialization, and the Albanian Red Cross began teaching first aid courses at workplaces and construction sites, opening a hospital to treat workers building the Durrës-Elbasan railway. It also opened two nurseries to aid working women, five orphanages, and a nursing home.

=== 1950 – 1990 ===
In the 1950s and 1960s, the Albanian Red Cross slowly began to be influenced by other organizations of the same name in Eastern Europe that had become de facto agents of government propaganda for national health programs rather than independent humanitarian organizations as the statutes and principles of the Red Cross Movement intended. By 1969, the majority of the Albanian Red Cross activities were carried out by the state, which resulted in the halt of all practical programs.

From 1969 to 1990, the Albanian Red Cross did not operate.

=== 1991 – Present ===
In 1991, the Albanian Red Cross was reborn as a new organization and began again operating. The Albanian government ratified the Geneva Protocols in 1993, and in 1994, the Albanian Red Cross was granted official status. It has since grown into the largest humanitarian organization in Albania and has developed its capacity in multiple areas.

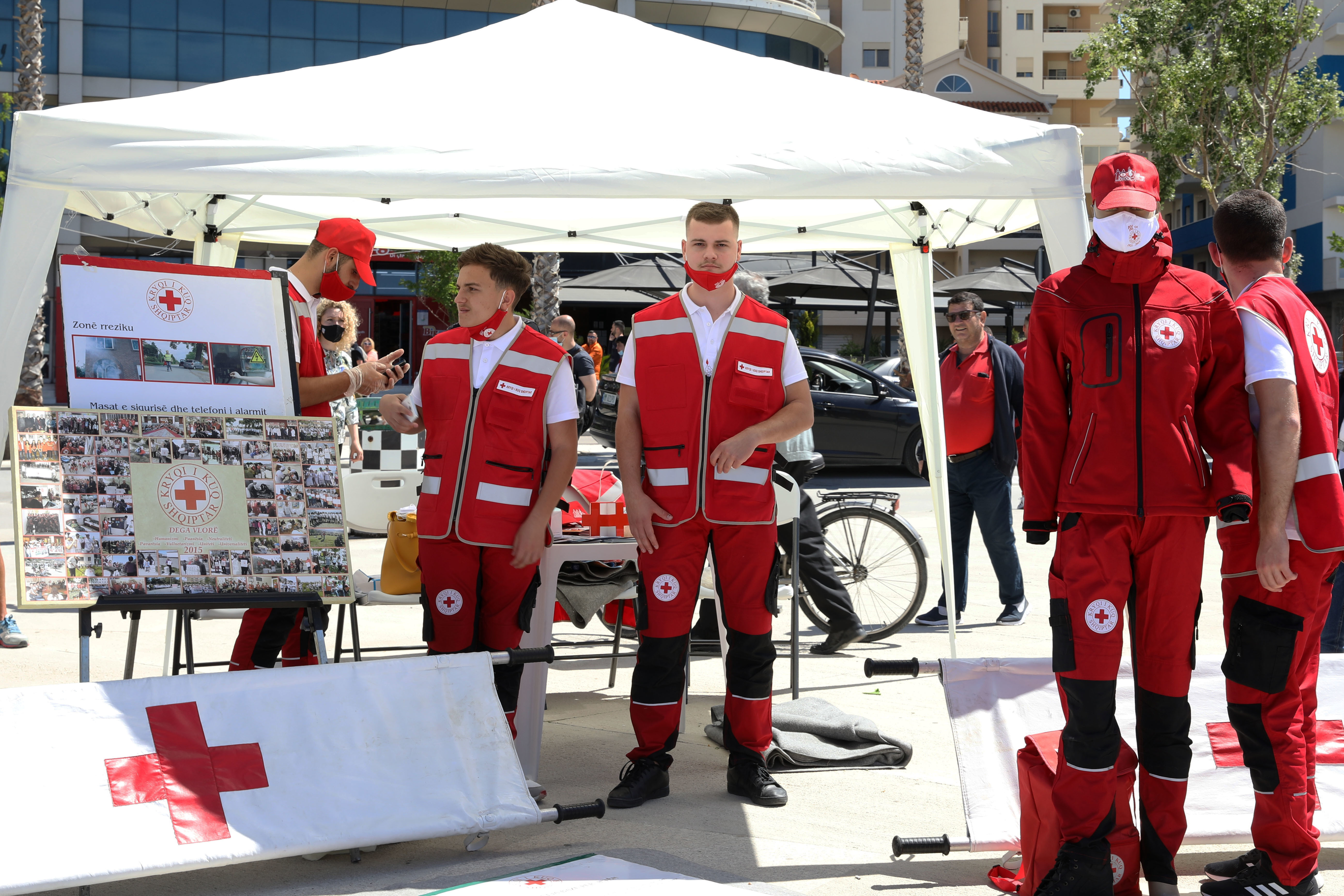
Volunteers of the Albanian Red Cross

In recognition of great humanitarian acts and support to the Red Cross, the Grand Badge of Honor and Merit of the Albanian Red Cross is the highest honor bestowed by the Albanian Red Cross, which is awarded in the form of a breast star medal as well as corresponding miniature medal, and entitles the recipient to use the post-nominal letters GBARC.

== Status ==
The Albanian Red Cross was recognized by the Albanian Parliament as an independent volunteer humanitarian organization under Law No. 7864 on September 29, 1994. As a member of the International Red Cross and Red Crescent Movement, it is guided by the Fundamental Principles and the Geneva Conventions. It is the sole Red Cross society for Albania. The Albanian government may grant budgetary funds to the Albanian Red Cross to carry out specific humanitarian activities. It does not pay tax.
