= Macukull =

- Administrative unit
- Location within Albania
- Coordinates: 41°42′N 20°5′E
- Country: Albania
- County: Diber
- Municipality: Mat

Population (2011)
  - Administrative unit: 1,565
- Time zone: UTC+1 (CET)
  - Summer (DST): UTC+2 (CEST)

Macukull is a village and a former municipality in the Burrel County, northern Albania. At the 2015 local government reform it became a subdivision of the municipality Mat. The population at the 2011 census was 1,565.

== Demographic history ==
Macukull (Maçukli) is recorded in the Ottoman defter of 1467 as a settlement belonging to the timar of Ali in the vilayet of Mati. The village had a total of 11 households which were represented by the following household heads: Lazar Gjyrka, Gjergj Gjika, Lazar Stojko, Nik Mazaraku, Pal Vishlati, Todor Vishlati, Lazar Urani, Kola Budi, Petra Firuni, Mihal Kalovaxhi, and Dimitri Gurbanëshi.
