= Derjan =

- Administrative unit
- Location within Albania
- Coordinates: 41°41′N 20°2′E
- Country: Albania
- County: Dibër
- Municipality: Mat

Population (2011)
  - Administrative unit: 1,102
- Time zone: UTC+1 (CET)
  - Summer (DST): UTC+2 (CEST)

Derjan is a village and a former municipality in the Dibër County, northern Albania. At the 2015 local government reform it became a subdivision of the municipality Mat. The population at the 2011 census was 1,102. It includes the following settlements: Derjan, Urxallë, Barbullej, Dukagjin, Gjoçaj, Lam i Madh, Zall Gjoçaj.

== Demographic history ==
Derjan (Dirjani) is recorded in the Ottoman defter of 1467 as a settlement belonging to the timar of Ali in the vilayet of Mati. The village was relatively small with a total of five households which were represented by the following household heads: Pal Balazi, Mihal Divalmi, Andrija Kipota, Gjergj Divalmi, and Gjon Kipota. In the register, a certain Mark Kastrioti from Derjan is attested as a yamak stationed in the village of Shtjaknëz (modern Shqefën).
