= Jason Tomes =

Polish historian

Jason Tomes is a historian with a doctorate of philosophy.

== Personal life ==
Between the years 1993 and 1995, he taught in Poland at Warsaw University and Adam Mickiewicz University. Since 1996, he has lectured in history and politics at Boston University's British Programs. He also ran as a candidate in local elections.

== Publications ==
He is the author of two European histories:

- Balfour and Foreign Policy: The International Thought of a Conservative Statesman (1997)
- King Zog: Self-Made Monarch of Albania (2003)
