= Mausoleum of the Albanian Royal Family =

Mausoleum in Tirana, Albania

Coordinates: 41°18′53″N 19°49′59″E

- Mauzoleu i familjes mbretërore
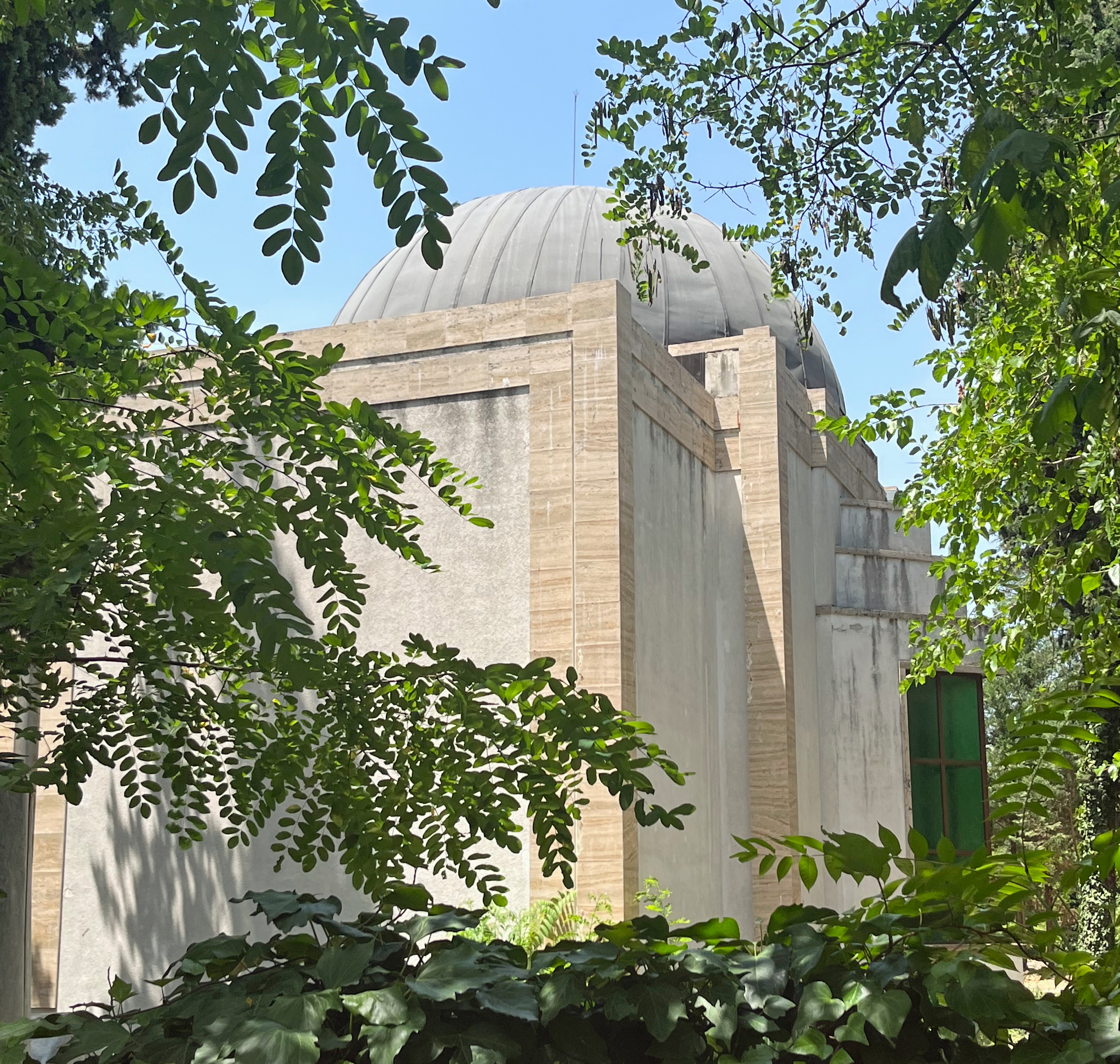
- Interactive map of the Mausoleum of the Albanian Royal Family area

General information
- Type: Cemetery
- Location: Kodra e Gështenjave, Tirana, Albania
- Completed: 30 December 1935
- Inaugurated: 30 December 1935
- Renovated: 17 November 2012
- Destroyed: 17 November 1944
- Owner: House of Zogu

Design and construction
- Architect: Qemal Butka
- Main contractor: The Government of Albania

The Mausoleum of the Albanian Royal Family is a building in Tirana, capital of Albania, which holds the remains of King Zog and other members of his family (House of Zogu).

The original mausoleum was designed by the architect Qemal Butka, and was inaugurated on 30 December 1935, for Sadijé, the King's mother, who had died the previous year. The building was destroyed by communist forces on 17 November 1944. It was reconstructed in the form of a replica, inaugurated on 17 November 2012, to house the remains of King Zog, which were brought back from Paris as part of the celebrations of the 100th anniversary of Albanian independence.

It holds the remains of:

- Zog I, King of the Albanians (1895–1961);
- Géraldine, Queen Consort of Albanians (1915–2002, King Zog I's wife);
- Sadijé, Queen Mother of the Albanians (1876–1934, King Zog I's mother);
- Leka I, Crown Prince of Albanians (1939–2011, King Zog I's son);
- Susan, Crown Princess of Albanians (1941–2004, King Zog I's daughter-in-law).
