= Mat District =

Albanian defunct administrative area

Mat District Rrethi i Matit
- Former district
- Coordinates: 41°34′N 20°1′E
- Country: Albania
- Dissolved: 2000
- Seat: Burrel

Area
  - Total: 1,028 km^{2} (397 sq mi)

Population (2001)
  - Total: 61,906
  - Density: 60.22/km^{2} (156.0/sq mi)
- Time zone: UTC+1 (CET)
  - Summer (DST): UTC+2 (CEST)

Mat District (Albanian: Rrethi i Matit) was one of the 36 districts of Albania, which were dissolved in July 2000 and replaced by 12 newly created counties. It had a population of 61,906 in 2001, and an area of 1,028 km^{2} (397 sq mi). It was named after the river Mat, which flows through the district. Its capital was the town of Burrel. Its territory is now part of Dibër County: the municipalities of Mat and Klos.

== Administrative divisions ==
The district consisted of the following municipalities:

- Baz
- Burrel
- Derjan
- Gurrë
- Klos
- Komsi
- Lis
- Macukull
- Rukaj
- Suç
- Ulëz
- Xibër

== History ==
Mat is believed to be one of the oldest Albanian settlements, most likely as old as the 2nd-5th century AD. At the beginning of the 15th century the Lord of Matja was Gjon Kastrioti, father of Skanderbeg. When Skanderbeg began his rebellion against Ottomans he also became the lord of Mat and some other territories as well. A synod of Catholic archdiocese was held in Matja in 1462 by Pal Egnelli known for his baptismal formula.

== Notable locals ==
- Zog of Albania, King of the Albanians
- Tarhoncu Ahmed Pasha, Grand Vizier of the Ottoman Empire

== Hereditary governors ==
	Name	Portrait	Birth and death	Reign started	Reign ended	Marriages	Succession right
1	Zogu Pasha [Zogu the Great]		?	?	?	Unknown wife	
2	'Abdu'llah Bey Zogolli		?	?	?	Unknown wife	son of Zogu Pasha
3	Ahmad Bey Zogolli		?	?	?	Unknown wife	son of 'Abdu'llah Bey Zogolli
4	Mahmud Pasha Zogolli		?	?	?	Unknown wife [4 childs]	son of Ahmad Bey Zogolli
5	Xhelal Pasha Zogolli		?	?	?	Ruhijé Hanem [4 childs]	son of Mahmud Pasha Zogolli
6	Riza Zogolli		?	?	?	Never married	son of Xhelal Pasha Zogolli
7	Xhemal Pasha Zogu		1860 Castle Burgajet (Albania) – 1911	?	1911	Zenja Malika Khanum 1880 [1 child] Sadiya Khanum 1887 [8 childs]	brother of Riza Zogolli
8	Zog I		8 October 1895 Burgajet Castle (Ottoman Empire) – 9 April 1961 Suresnes (France) (aged 65)	1911	9 April 1961	Countess Geraldine Apponyi de Nagy-Apponyi April 1938 [1 child]	Son of Xhemal Pasha Zogu
9	Leka I		5 April 1939 Tirana – 30 November 2011 Tirana (aged 72)	9 April 1961	30 November 2011	Susan Cullen-Ward 1975 [1 child]	Son of Zog I
10	Leka II		26 March 1982 Johannesburg (South Africa) (age 34)	30 November 2011	Present	Elia Zaharia 2016	Son of Leka I

== Gallery ==
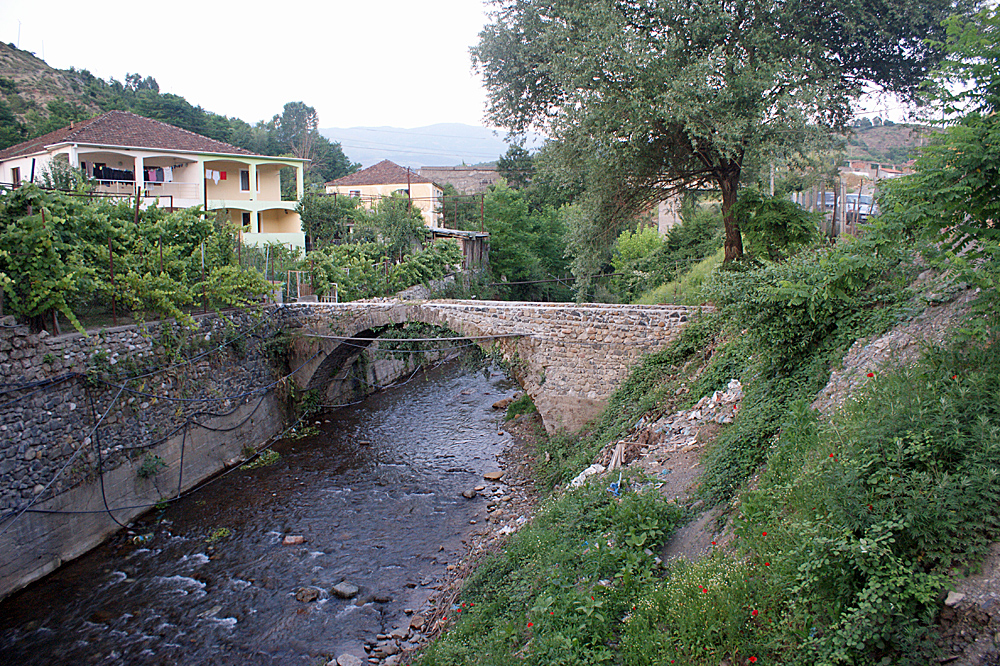
Ottoman Bridge in Klos

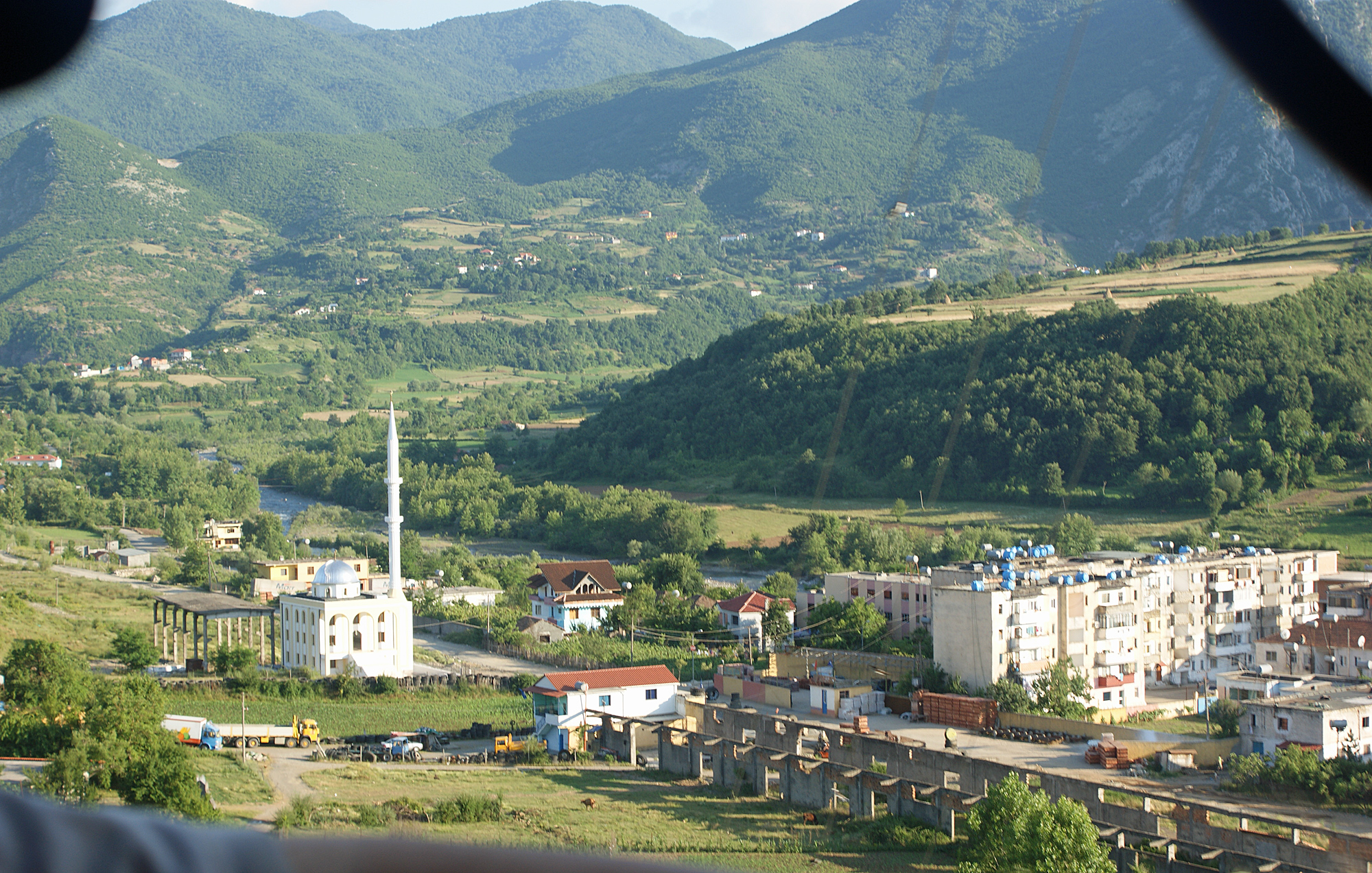
Klos, Mat

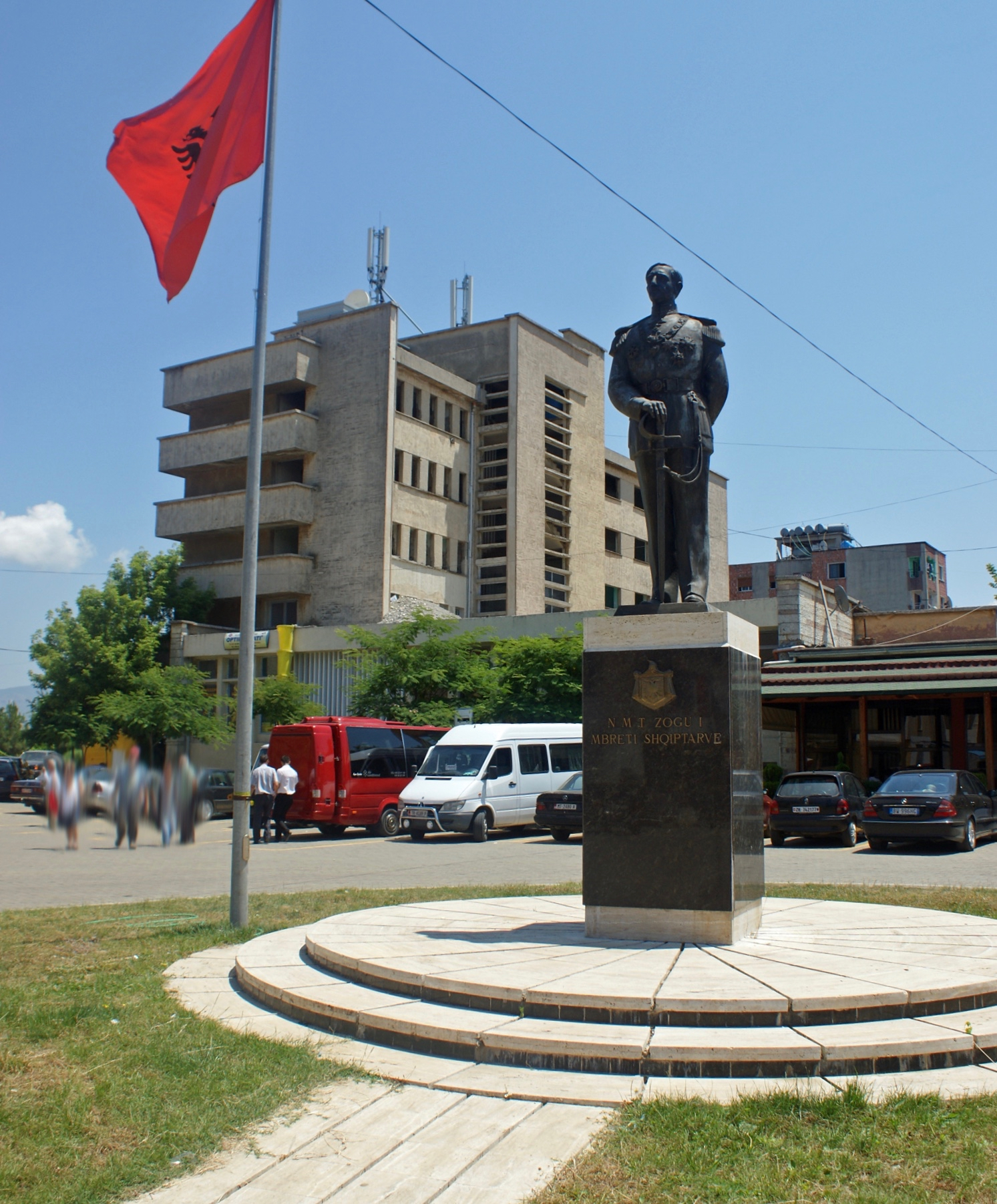
King Zog monument in Burrel

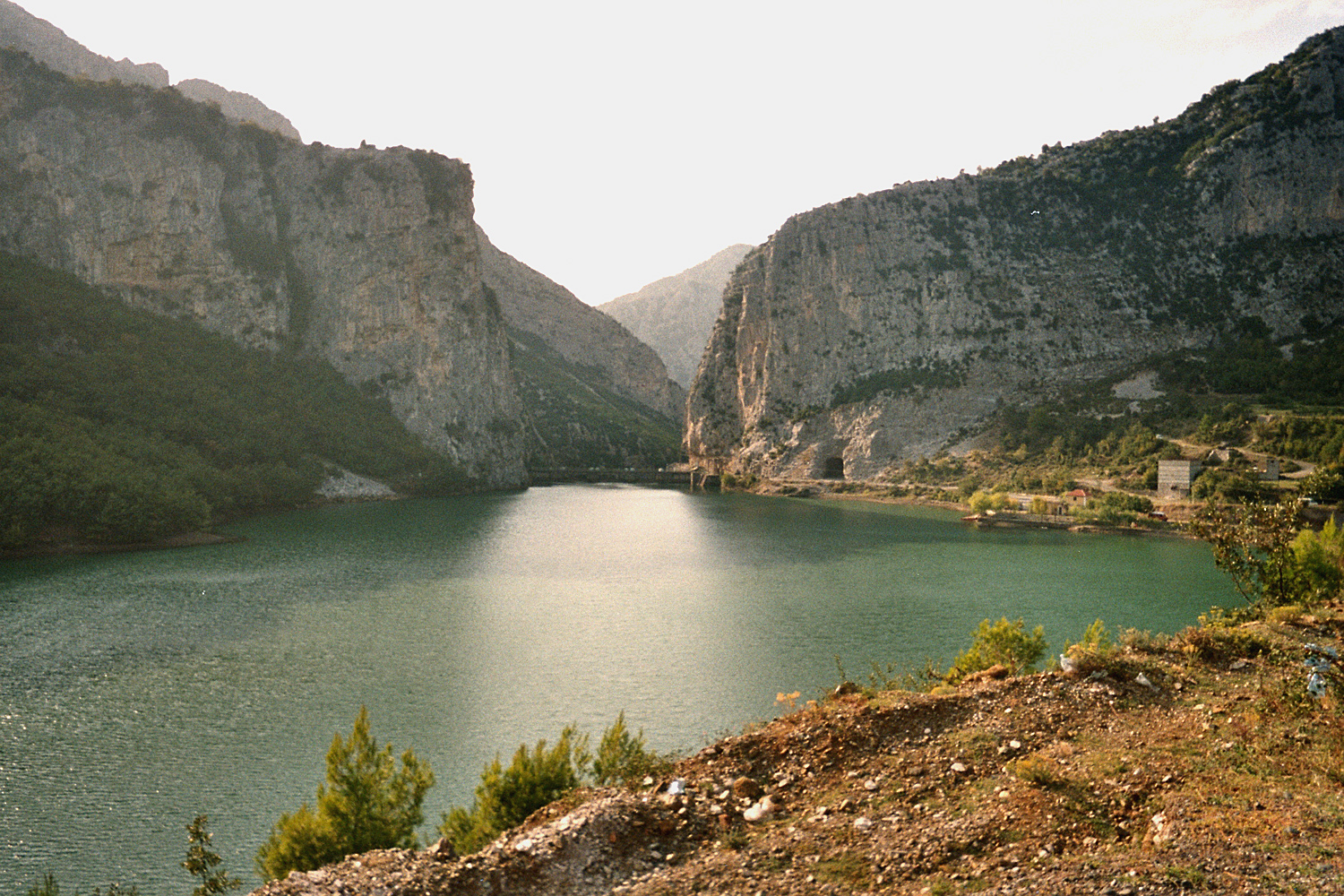
Lake of Shkopet

== See also ==
- Mat (municipality)
