= Xhelal Pasha Zogolli =

Xhelal Pasha Zogu
- Hereditary Governor of Mati
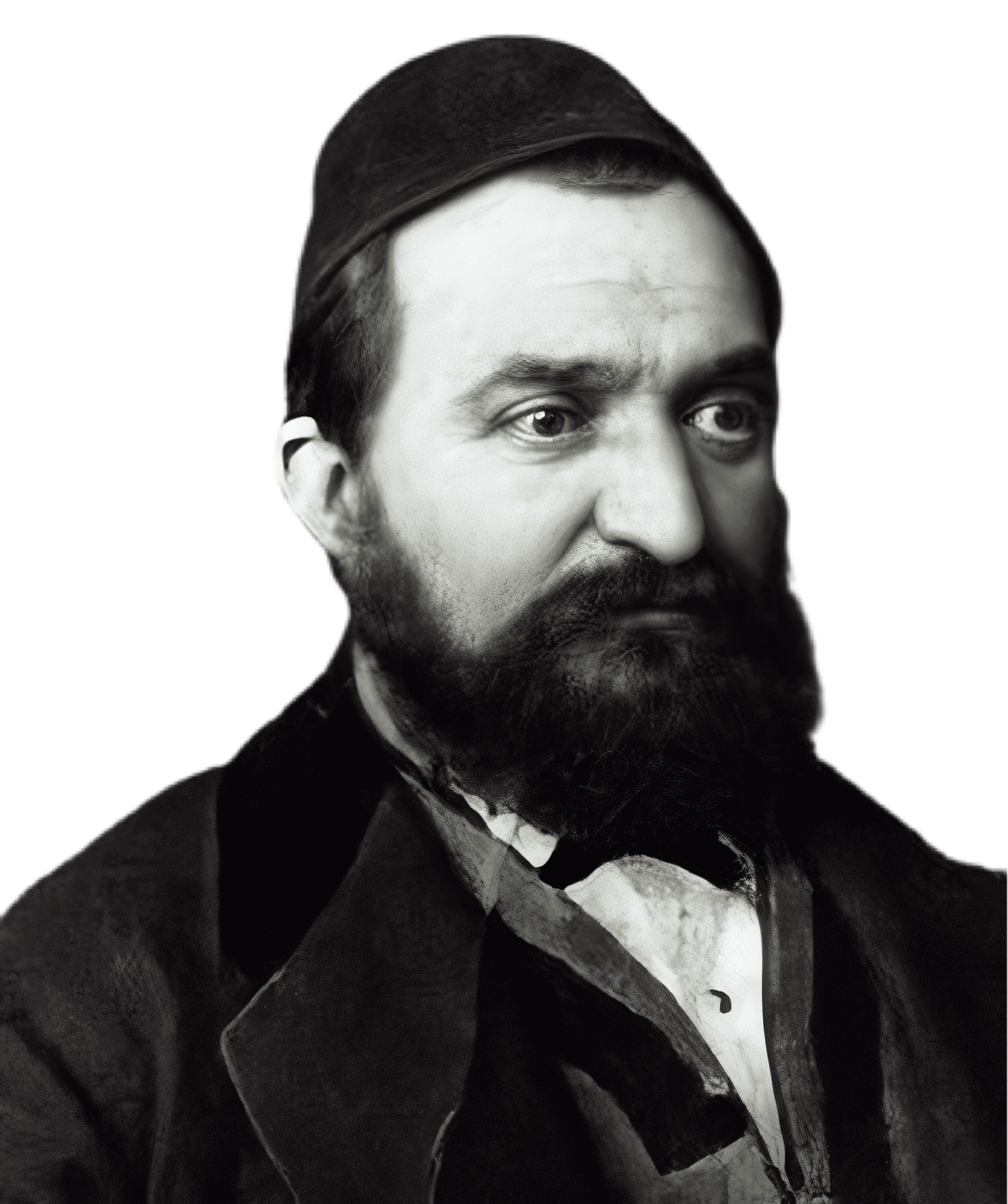
- Born: Mat (municipality)
- Died: Vienna, Austria-Hungary
- Spouse: Ruhijé Hanem
- Issue: Xhemal Pasha Zogu; Riza Zogolli
- House: Zogu
- Father: Mahmud Pasha Zogolli
- Religion: Islam

Xhelal Pasha Zogolli or Celal Pasha Zogolli was an Albanian bey and hereditary governor of Mati who founded the dynasty that would eventually produce King Zog I. As head of a feudal landowning family with authority over the Mati region, he participated in the Montenegrin War of 1852-53 and later attempted a local rebellion against Ottoman rule following a visit to Russia.

== Life ==
Xhelal Pasha Zogolli was born in the Mati region of modern-day Albania (it was a part of the Ottoman Empire when he was born). His father was Mahmud Pasha Zogolli, and his family was a Muslim Albanian beylik family of landowners, with feudal authority over the region of Mati. Xhelal Pasha Zogolli was educated privately.

He served in the Montenegrin War of 1852-53. Later, he visited Russia and, inspired by Russians, attempted a local rebellion against Ottoman rule after his return which was unsuccessful because of the low participation.

He married Ruqiya Khanum or Ruhijé Hanem, from the wealthy Alltuni family of Kavajë. He had ownership of the Burgajet Castle, near Burrel in northern Albania, and his son Xhemal Pasha Zogu was born there in 1860. He apparently died by poison by Ottoman agents in Vienna, Austria, even though this claim is not yet proven. He was buried in Haji Badem Uskanda, Istanbul, Turkey.

== Bibliography ==
- Patrice Najbor, Histoire de l'Albanie et de sa maison royale (5 volumes), JePublie, Paris, 2008, (ISBN 978-2-9532382-0-4).
- Patrice Najbor, La dynastye des Zogu, Textes & Prétextes, Paris, 2002
