= Order of Besa =

Albanian Order of Knighthood

Order of Besa Urdhëri i Besës
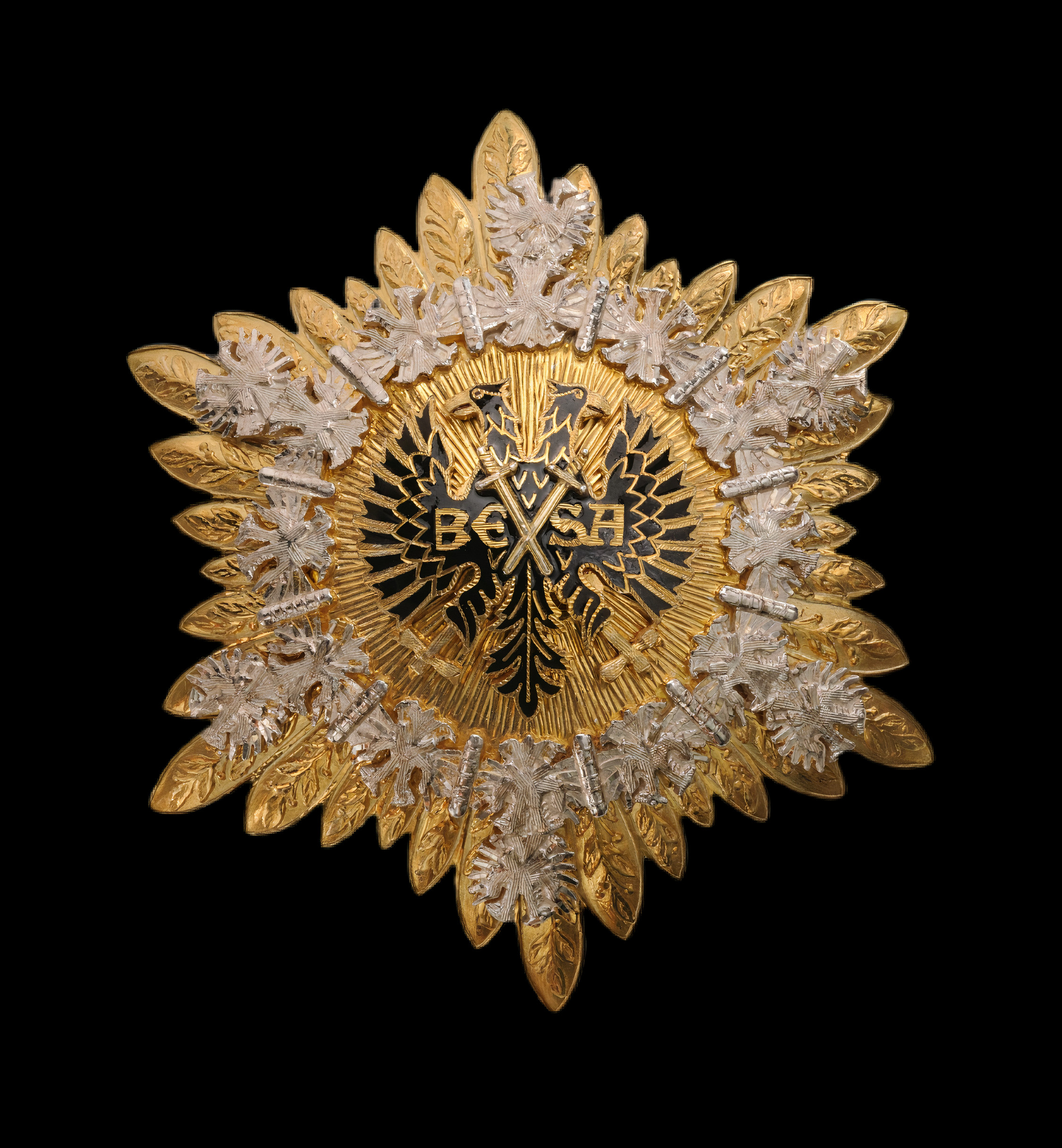

Awarded by Head of the House of Zogu
- Type: 1926–1939 (State order); 1939–present (House order)
- Established: 22 December 1926
- Royal house: House of Zogu
- Awarded for: Extraordinary achievements in every field and especially for eminent services rendered to the State, the Sovereign and the Royal Family
- Sovereign: Crown Prince Leka of Albania
- Grades: Grand Cross, Special Class; Grand Cross; Grand Officer; Commander; Officer; Knight/Dame

Precedence
- Next (higher): Collar of honor of Albania
- Next (lower): Order of Skanderbeg
- Ribbon bar

The Order of Besa (Albanian: Urdhëri i Besës), also known as the Order of Fidelity, was established by Ahmet Zogu (later King Zog I) when he was President of Albania. Founded on 22 December 1926, it was initially awarded in four classes (1. Grand Cordon with star–Kordon i Madh me Yll, 2. Grand Officer–Oficer i Madh, 3. Commander–Komandar, and 4. Knight–Kalorës) and a medal. It was limited to six ordinary recipients of Albanian nationality, and was not awardable to foreigners.

It was remodelled in 1932 and reduced to three classes:

1. Grand Cordon with star–Kordon i Madh me Yll
2. Commander–Komandar
3. Knight–Kalorës.

It remained limited to only six ordinary recipients of Albanian nationality, and not awardable to foreigners.

The order was retained under the Kingdom of Albania of King Vittorio Emanuele III until 1943, and by the House of Zogu as a dynastic order.

At its last remodelling, it had six classes:

- Grand Cross, Special Class
- Grand Cross
- Grand Officer
- Commander
- Officer
- Knight/Dame

== Notable recipients ==
- King Farouk of Egypt
- Prince Abib of Turkey
- Mohammad Reza Pahlavi, Shah of Iran
- Anwar Sadat, President of Egypt
- Miklós Horthy, Regent of the Kingdom of Hungary
- Elia Zaharia, ex-wife of Leka, Prince of Albania.

== See also ==
- Orders, decorations and medals of Albania
