= Lis, Albania =

Lis
- Administrative unit
- Location within Albania
- Coordinates: 41°38′N 20°5′E
- Country: Albania
- County: Dibër
- Municipality: Mat

Population (2011)
  - Administrative unit: 3,824
- Time zone: UTC+1 (CET)
  - Summer (DST): UTC+2 (CEST)

Lis is a village and a former municipality in the Dibër County, northern Albania. At the 2015 local government reform it became a subdivision of the municipality Mat. The population at the 2011 census was 3,824.

== Demographic history ==
Lis (Liz) is recorded in the Ottoman defter of 1467 as a hass-ı mir-liva settlement in the vilayet of Mati. The village had a total of nine households which were represented by the following household heads: Petër Syimiri, Gjon Birjuvi, Marin Franko, Tanush Birjuvi, Gjon Gjiriki, Palko Pipi, Gjon Xhani, Nikolla Todi, and Dom Valandidi.
