= Tati, Prince of Kosovo =

Tati Esad Murad Kryeziu
- Prince of Kosova
- Born: 24 December 1923; Tirana, Principality of Albania
- Died: 17 August 1993 (aged 69); Cannes, France
- Spouse: Munira Sabri (m. 1952; div. 1970)
- Father: Ceno Bey Kryeziu
- Mother: Nafije Zogu

Tati Essad Murad Kryeziu, Prince of Kosova (24 December 1923 – 17 August 1993) was the heir presumptive to the throne of Albania from the creation of monarchy, under King Zog I, on 1 September 1928 prior to the birth of Crown Prince Leka on 5 April 1939.

Tati Kryeziu was born in Tirana, the son of Princess Nafijé Zogu and Ceno Bey Kryeziu. His uncle presented Tati as a potential successor; Tati was made a general at the age of four and was often featured in official photographs, standing beside King Zog in military dress.

In 1931, he was created Prince of Kosova (Princ i Kosovës), with the style of His Highness, as heir presumptive to the Albanian throne (1928–1939).

He married, as her second husband, Munira Fawzi née Sabri, a relative of Queen Nazli of Egypt, at Cannes, France, on 24 February 1952. They divorced in 1970. He died in Cannes, France, on 17 August 1993 without issue.
