= Mat (municipality) =

- Municipality
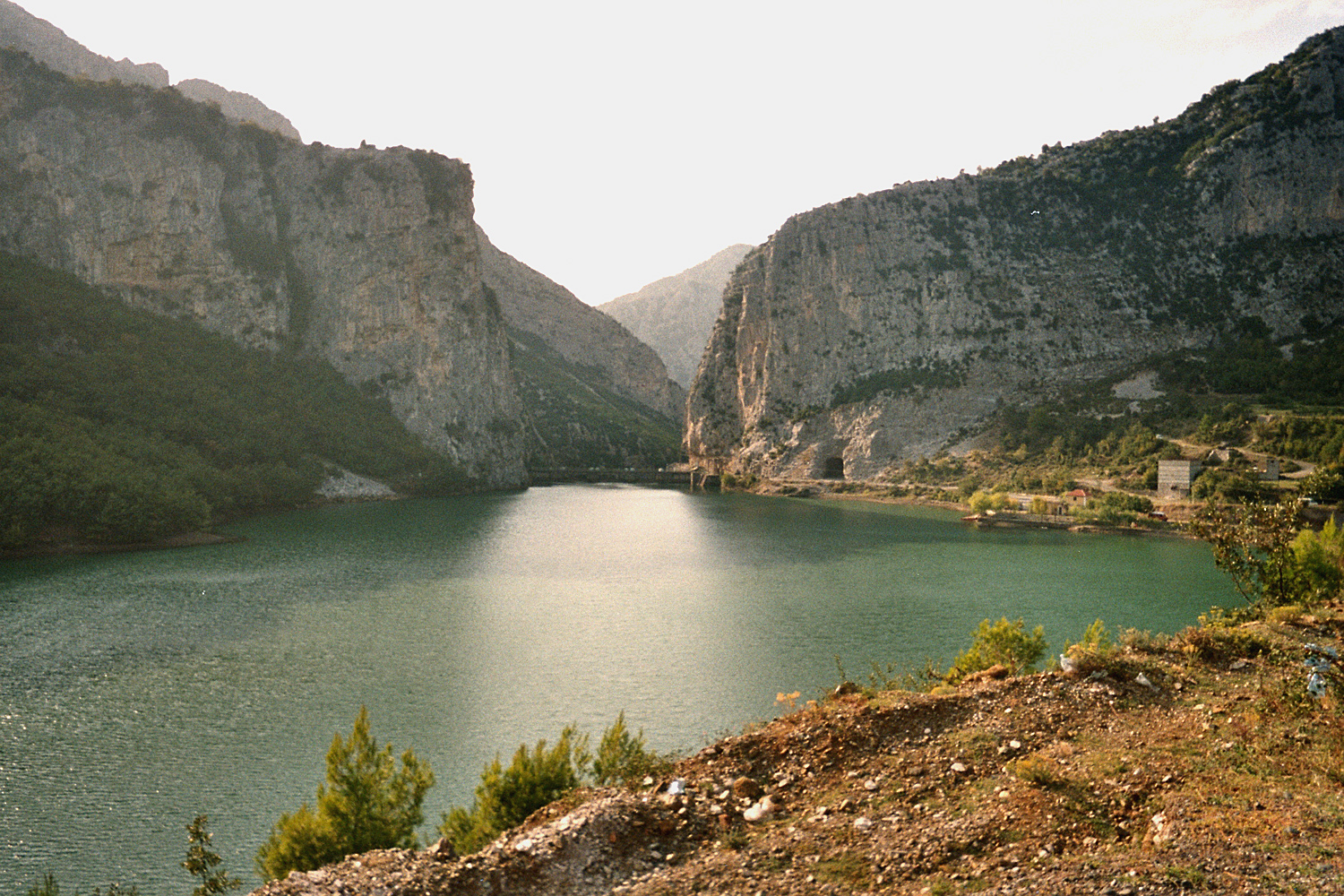
- Ulza Lake

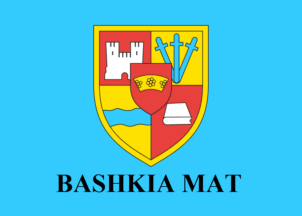
- Flag Emblem

- Location within Albania
- Coordinates: 41°37′N 20°0′E
- Country: Albania
- County: Dibër

Government
  - Mayor: Altin Bojni (PS)

Area
  - Municipality: 493.81 km^{2} (190.66 sq mi)

Population (2011)
  - Municipality: 27,600
  - Municipality density: 55.9/km^{2} (145/sq mi)
- Demonym(s): Albanian: Matjan (m), Matjane (f)
- Time zone: UTC+1 (CET)
  - Summer (DST): UTC+2 (CEST)
- Postal Code: 8001
- Area Code: (0)217
- Website: bashkiamat.gov.al

Mat (Albanian definite form: Mati, Latin: Mathis) is a municipality in Dibër County, northern Albania. The municipality consists of the administrative units of Baz, Burrel, Derjan, Komsi, Lis, Macukull, Rukaj and Ulëz. It was created in 2015 by the merge of the former municipalities Baz, Burrel, Derjan, Komsi, Lis, Macukull, Rukaj and Ulëz. The seat of the municipality is the town Burrel. The total population is 27,600 (2011 census), in a total area of 493.81 km^{2}.

== Etymology ==
The Albanian name mat originally meant "elevated location", "mountain place". Today's meaning in Albanian, "river bank, river shore", is a consequence of a secondary change through the common use of both the terms mal, "mountain" and breg, "shore", giving the meaning of "elevation". The river Mat was recorded by Roman writer Vibius Sequester (4th or 5th century AD) as Mathis, following a hellenized graphic mode of the term mat. It appeared in written records also as Mathia in 1380. Historical linguistic considerations suggest that Mat and the surrounding regions, including Mirdita, have been among the oldest settlements of the Albanians after their ethnogenesis, which is considered to have been completed between the 2nd and the 5th–6th centuries AD.

== Overview ==
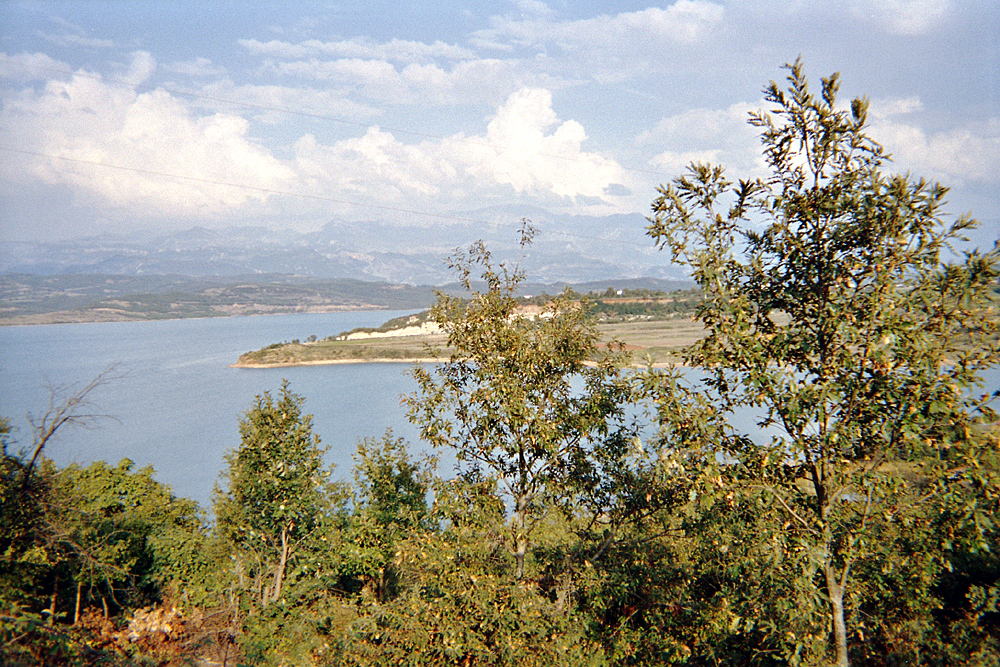
Lake Ulza in the northern Mat valley

The municipality is located on the middle part of the Mat river's course. It encompasses the northern part of the former Mat District; the southern part is now part of Klos. The territory is largely composed of mountains and hills, which has only been opened up by National Road 6, which links the town of Milot with Peshkopi.

The area is bounded by mountain ranges to the east and west. The Mat river is dammed in two locations in the area, forming Lake Ulzë and the smaller Lake Shkopet. The municipality also contains a part of the Zall Gjoçaj National Park.

A notable figure of Mat is King Zog of Albania, born in Burgajet, a village in northern Mat.

== See also ==
- Mat District

== Sources ==
=== Bibliography ===
- Elsie, Robert (2010). Historical Dictionary of Albania (PDF). Historical Dictionaries of Europe. Vol. 75 (2 ed.). Scarecrow Press. p. 255. ISBN 978-0810861886. Archived from the original (PDF) on 6 October 2014.
- Matzinger, Joachim (2009). "Shqiptarët si pasardhës të ilirëve nga këndvështrimi i gjuhësisë historike". In Schmitt, Oliver Jens; Frantz, Eva Anne (eds.). Historia e Shqiptarëve: Gjendja dhe perspektivat e studimeve (in Albanian). Translated by Pandeli Pani and Artan Puto. Botime Përpjekja. ISBN 978-99943-0-254-3.
