= Burgajet Castle =

Fortified house in Mat, Albania

Burgajet Castle Kalaja e Burgajetit
- Burgajet, Mat
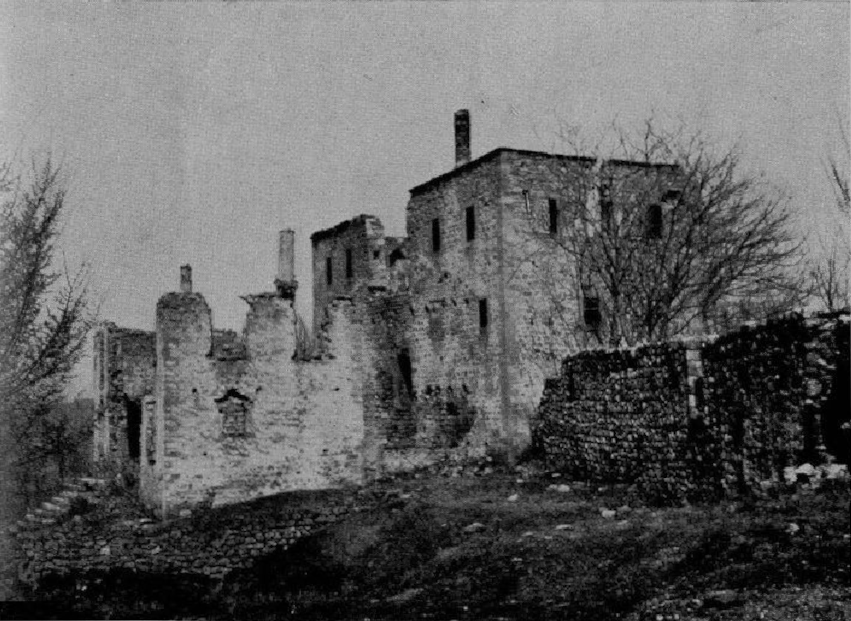
- Burgajet castle in ruins

Site information
- Type: Fortress
- Owner: House of Zogu
- Condition: Ruins

Location
- Location within Albania
- Coordinates: 41°38′24″N 20°3′16″E

Site history
- Built: 19th century
- Built by: House of Zogu
- In use: 19th century - 1920
- Demolished: 1945

Buragajet Castle, or Castle Burgajeti, (Albanian: Kalaja e Burgajetit or Sarajet e Burgajetit, also known as the Kështjella e Zogollëve or Saraji i Zogut) was a large fortified house, located in Burgajet in northern Mat, Albania.

== History ==
It was built before 1860 and it was the birthplace, and family seat, of King Zog I of the Albanians and also Xhemal Pasha Zogu during the era of the Ottoman Empire in Albania.

Jason Tomes described it thus:

"A solid rectangular building with two small wings facing into a courtyard. This was Castle Burgajet, citadel of the chieftain of Mati...the biggest house for miles and the only one with glazed windows. The interior was even more distinctive...Fancy furnishings, imported from Austria, had recently become the hallmark of wealth. Salon chairs, draperies, table-lamps, and bric-a-brac..."

His family were the traditional feudal rulers of the Mat District of Albania and were large landowners.

On ascending the throne, Zog took up residence in a palace in Tirana (with a Summer Palace in Durrës - see image). This (along with it being looted and set alight by the Yugoslav Army in 1920) was a factor leading to Castle Burgajet falling into ruin.

Before King Zog was forced to flee Albania, he had an ambitious plan to rebuild the Castle but this never transpired; during his reign, however, a plaque commemorated his birth there. When asked why he did not rebuild Burgajet, Zog replied "I was too busy rebuilding my country."

The castle was demolished in 1945 and the site of the castle is now marked by several marble stones from the demolished castle.

== Gallery ==
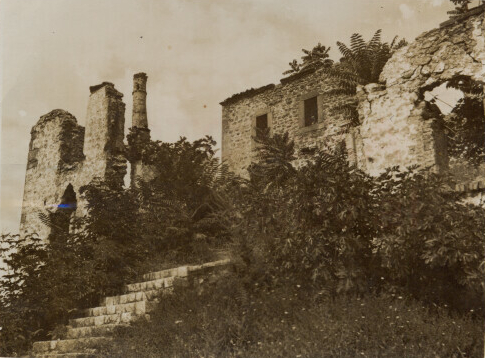

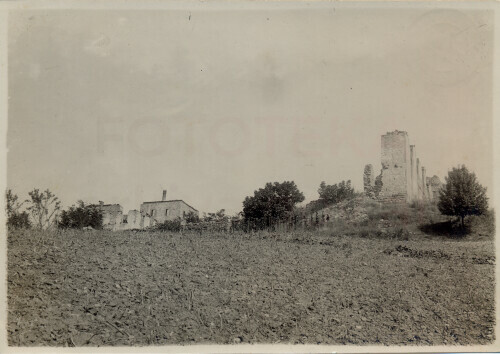

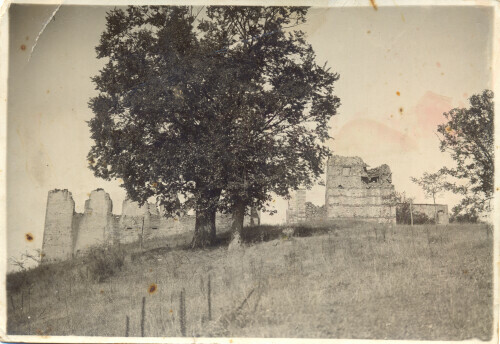

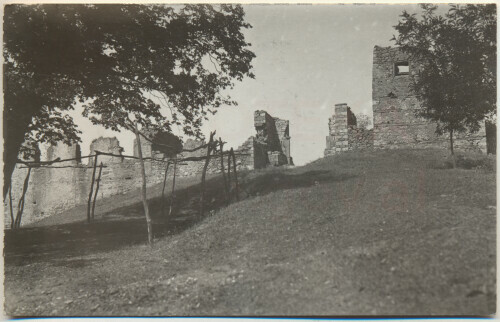
