= Mat (region) =

Region of North-central Albania

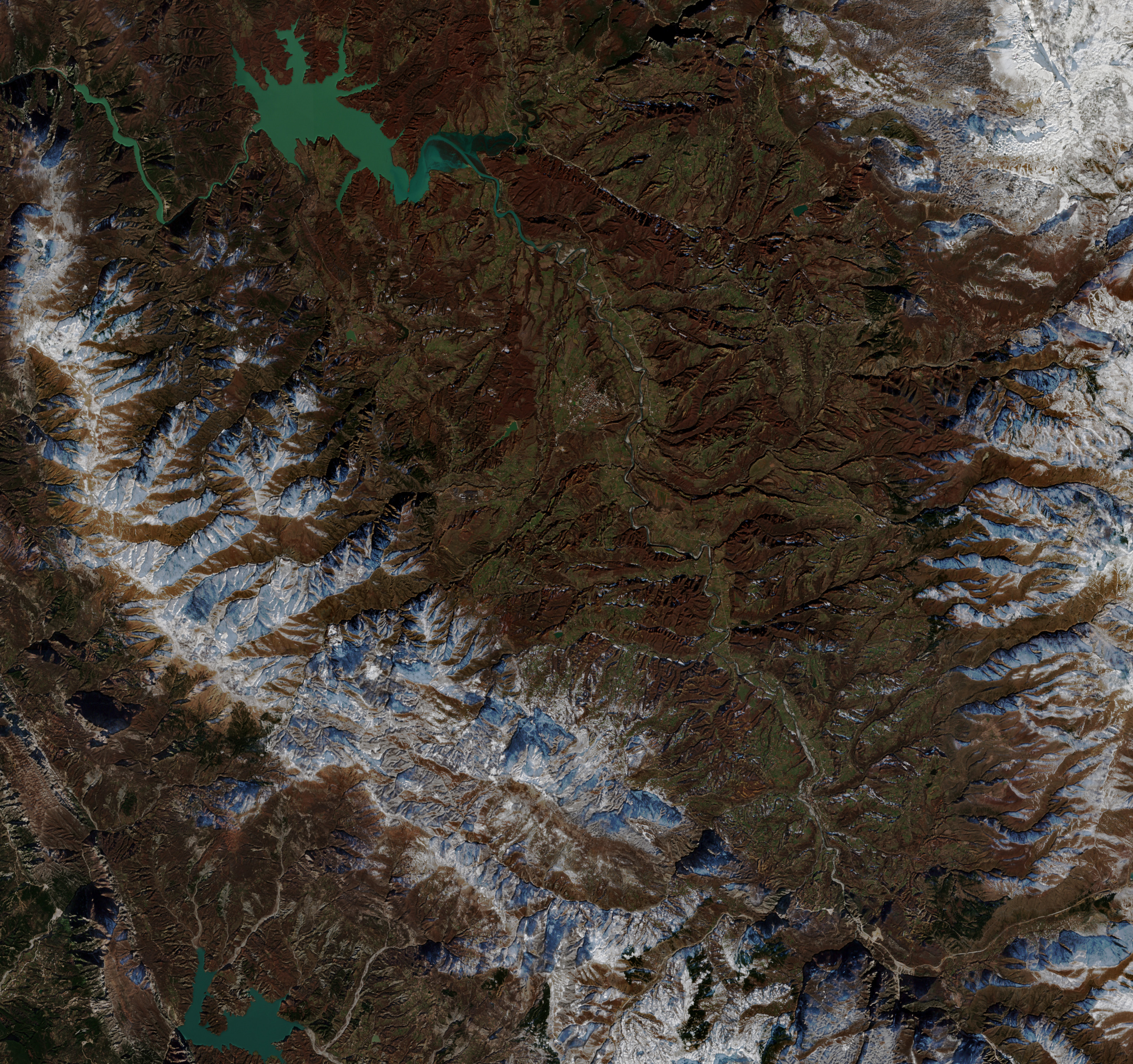
A satellite view of the Mat valley in the winter. The mountains surrounding it are capped in snow, while the Mat river is visible, as well as Lake Ulëz and Shkopet in the north.

Mat (Albanian definite form: Mati) is a region in north-central Albania, referring to the valley of the Mat river and its surrounding mountains.

== Etymology ==
The Albanian term mat, meaning "height", "beach", "bank/shore" in Northern Albanian and "beach", "shore" in Arbëresh, is inherited from Proto-Albanian *mata < *mn̥-ti "height" (cf. Latin mŏns "mountain"), after which the river Mat and the region with the same name in north-central Albania was named, which can be explained as "mountain river". The meaning "bank/shore" hence would have emerged only at a later time (cf. German: Berg "mountain" in relation to Slavic *bergъ "bank/shore").

Location of Mat in Albania.

The river name was attested for the first time in Latin as "Mathis" by the 4th/5th century writer Vibius Sequester. The name is also seen as:

- "Mathia" in 1308 in the Anonymi Descriptio Europae Orientalis;
- "Matia" in 1338 in an act of Robert, King of Naples;
- "Mat" in 1488 in an Ottoman tax document;
- "Matia" in 1515 in the Breve memoria of Gjon Muzaka;
- "Machia" on the 1554 Mercator map;
- "Mattia" in the 1570 anonymous Relazione dell'Albania;
- "Ematthia" in the 1591 report of Lorenzo Bernardo;
- "Emathia" in 1596 in Jaques De Lavardin's Historie of George Castriot;
- "Mathia" in 1610 in the report of Marino Bizzi;
- "Matthia" in 1614 in the report of the Venetian writer Mariano Bolizza;
- "Ematia" in 1621 in a letter of Pjetër Budi;
- "Man", a misspelling or misreading for "Mat", in 1662 in the Seyahatnâme of Evliya Çelebi;
- "Emathia" in the 1671 report by Piero Stefano Gaspari;
- "Mathia" in about 1685 in the report of Giorgio Stampaneo;
- "Matis" in 1821 on the map of French consul Hugues Pouqueville; and
- "Máthis" in 1848 in the journal of Edward Lear.

== History ==
Archeological research has demonstrated that the region has been populated since the Paleolithic era. In antiquity the region was inhabited by various Illyrian populations including the Albanoi, Abroi and Taulantii. Following the Illyro-Roman Wars in the second century BC, the region came under Roman control. Historical linguistic considerations suggest that Mat and the surrounding regions, including Mirdita, have been among the oldest settlements of the Albanians after their ethnogenesis, which is considered to have been completed between the 2nd and the 5th–6th centuries AD.

In the 14th century, the region was part of the medieval Principality of Albania. In an act of Robert, King of Naples, Tanusio Thopia was mentioned as Count of Mat (conte di Matia) in 1338, a title which would also be held by his successors.

In the 15th century, the Kastrioti family controlled most of the territory. Gjon Kastrioti and his son Skanderbeg held the title Lord of Mat (Aemathiae Princeps). The region also played an important role during Skanderbeg's rebellion.

According to a 1918 census carried out by the Austro-Hungarians, Mat at the time consisted of 3,986 households and 23,643 total individuals.

== Ethnography ==
Mati is also regarded as one of the tribes of Albania, however not in the sense of a fis, with blood ties and a common history and single male ancestor. Nonetheless, the region has a strong collective identity and formed its own military unit in war (bajrak). The basin of the Mat river consists of rolling hills surrounded by mountains that have long protected the inhabitants. Because it was so isolated, the German historian Georg Stadtmüller (1901–85) postulated that the Albanian people could be traced to this specific region. Mat has been inhabited since at least the Bronze Age, but no urban areas had developed there until the modest town of Burrel in the mid-20th century.

In the 19th century, the Mat region was inhabited by four different clans headed by one or more families, each a primus inter pares in the region: the Bozhiqi in the upper valley, the Çelaj to the south, the Olomani or Alamani, and the Zogolli in the north.

In the 20th century Mat was the home of Ahmet bey Zogolli (1895–1961), also known as Ahmet Zogu, who ruled Albania 1924–1939, mostly as King Zog. He had become head of the Zogolli when his father, Xhemal Pasha Zogolli (1860–1911) died.

== Notable locals ==
- Zog of Albania, King of the Albanians
- Pjetër Budi, 16th century writer and a Catholic bishop
- Tarhoncu Ahmed Pasha, Grand Vizier of the Ottoman Empire
- Kurt Agë Kadiu, one of the signatories of the Albanian Declaration of Independence
- Hysni Milloshi, communist politician
- Juliana Pasha, singer

== See also ==
- Burrel
- Mat (municipality)
- Klos (municipality)
- Mat (river)
- Geography of Albania
- Central Mountain Range
