= Burrel Prison =

1938 establishments in Albania

Institucioni i Ekzekutimit të Vendimit Penal Burrel
- Interactive map of Institucioni i Ekzekutimit të Vendimit Penal Burrel
- Location: Burrel, Albania; 41°36′24″N 20°0′46″E
- Status: Active
- Security class: High Security
- Capacity: 190
- Population: 148 (April 2013)
- Opened: 1938, 1997 reopened
- Closed: 1992 - 1997
- Managed by: Ministry of Justice, Albania
- Director: Demir Cupi

Burrel Prison (Albanian: Burgu i Burrelit) is a high security prison located outside the town of Burrel, in northeastern Albania at the District Police Station in Mat with a maximum capacity of 198 inmates. In 2011 the prison housed 182 inmates and employed 120 corrections officers. The one-story structure is divided into three areas covering 21,000 square meters.

Burrel Prison closed in 1992 after the Democratic Party of Albania deposed the Party of Labour of Albania. The prison was reopened in 1997 and is one of Albania's 21 prisons active today, one of five that houses prisoners sentenced for life, and one of only two that houses prisoners convicted for organized crime. There has been a movement by some activists to close the prison and make it the site of a memorial to those tortured and killed there between 1944 and 1992.

In May 2013, the Director of Burrel Prison, Demir Çupi, was suspended after an incident involving a prisoner, Zeneli, who was granted a 5-day leave to visit his wife in Kukes but did not return to the prison. This was the third such incident in 2013.

== History ==
Plans for the prison were begun in 1937, during the reign of King Zog. The government of Kostaq Kotta decided to build a prison for 2000 inmates, but the project was not finished until 1939 due to problems with funding its completion.

The prison is well known for having housed political prisoners before and during the regime of Enver Hoxha, many of whom were imprisoned without due process, tortured, and forced to endure inhuman conditions. Albania may have had more than 100 prisons during this time, but Burrel Prison is one of the most notorious sites along with Burgu i Qafë Barit and Burgu i Spaçit. Political prisoners eventually included many people and the families of people who held prominent positions within the Socialist People's Republic of Albania party apparatus, who were subsequently accused of opposition crimes by the regime, as well as people imprisoned for practicing religion, which was illegal, and others thought to be associated with an opposition movement in any form. Those charged with opposition crimes were convicted for terms of at least 20 years, but many prisoners had their sentences "extended" while in the prison, including Pjetër Arbnori who was known as "the Mandela of the Balkans" because of the length of his more than 28-year internment in Burrel Prison.

== Notable inmates of Burrel Prison between 1939 and 1992 ==
Pjetër Arbnori
Schoolteacher imprisoned in Burrel for more than 28 years.
Sokrat Dodbiba
Economist, former Minister of Finance of Albania during 1943-44, died in prison
Memet Hamzo
Founder of Ringjallja, one of the first organizations founded in the mid 1990s in Albania which provided economic and social opportunities to persecuted families; Former co-owner of Kantina Skënderbeu; From Dukat, Vlora and imprisoned for 19 years.
Dom Simon Jubani
Catholic Priest who was arrested while serving in Miredita; imprisoned for 26 years.
Kristo Kirka
Head of Vatra, Boston branch, Dielli's manager, and Balli Kombetar activist. Died in prison
Koço Kota
Prime Minister of Albania at the time the prison was opened; later sentenced to death while an inmate at the prison.
Fatos Lubonja
Former head of Albanian national television, imprisoned for voicing opposition to the regime after Albania's split with the USSR in 1960.
Zef Pëllumbi
Catholic Priest imprisoned in Burrel during Hoxha's regime.
Bashkim Shehu
Author and son of Mehmet Shehu, whose family was executed or imprisoned by Hoxha's regime. The remains of Mehmet's wife were found near the village of Ndroq in 2000.

== In popular culture ==
Davis Guggenheim's 2014 draft of the screenplay of Bad Boys for Life opens at Burrel Prison.

== See also ==
- Forced labour camps in Communist Albania
- Spaç Prison
- Qafë Bar Prison
- Ministry of Justice (Albania)
