= Lake Ulza Nature Park =

Regional park and a tourist attraction in Albania

- IUCN category IV (habitat/species management area)
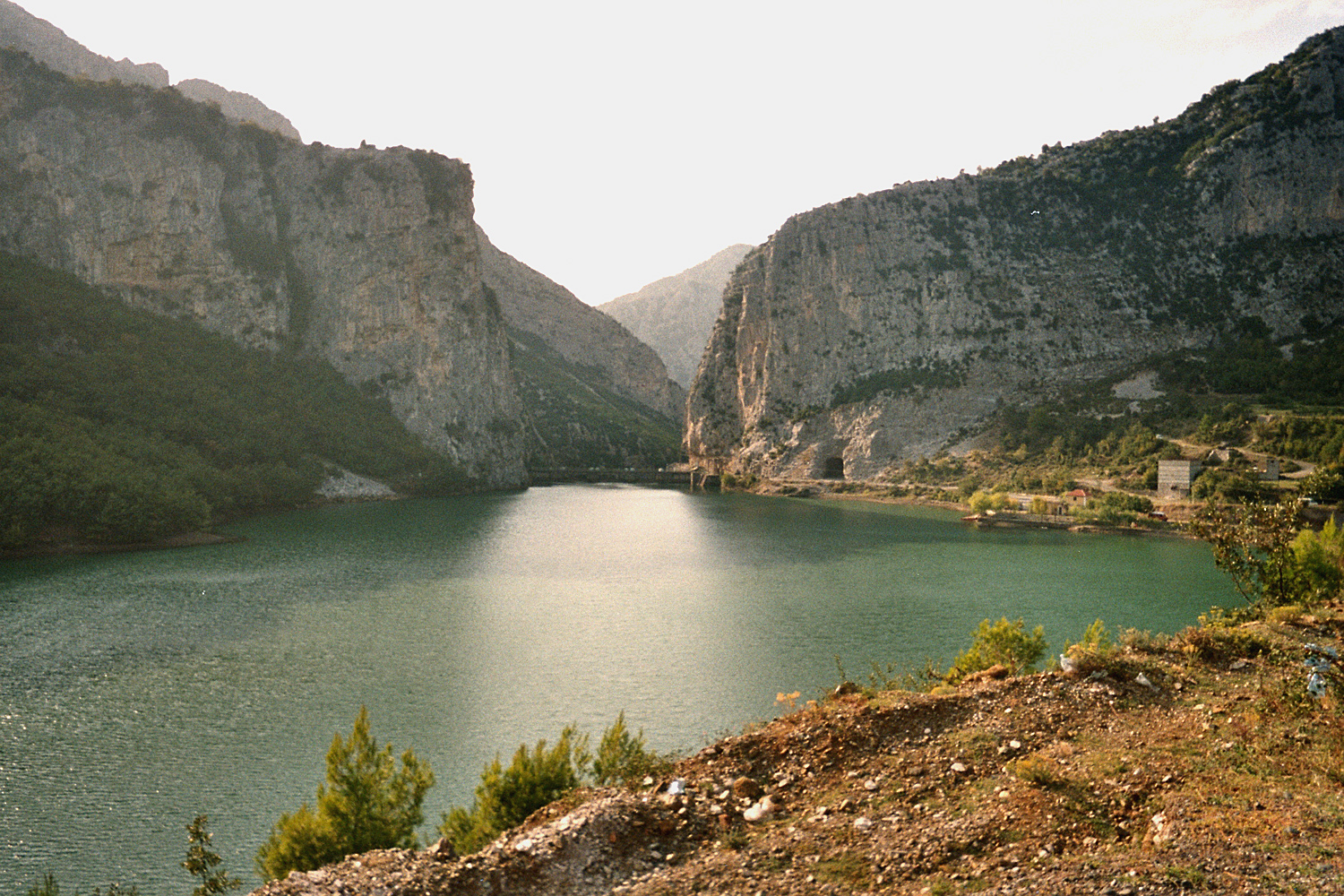
- Lake Shkopet

- Location within Albania
- Location: Mat, Dibër County
- Nearest city: Ulëz, Burrel
- Coordinates: 41°40′28″N 19°52′19″E
- Area: 4,206 hectares (42.06 km^{2})
- Established: 2013

Lake Ulza Nature Park (Albanian: Parku Natyror Liqeni i Ulzës) is a regional nature park located in Mat, Albania. It covers a surface area of 4206 hectares and is located near the town of Burrel in the central part of the country.

== Characteristics ==
The park is a complex ecosystem consisting of the Ulza and Shkopet lakes, mountains, and surrounding hills. Located just 5 km from the Milot-Mat road, the region is in a polycene-quaternary relief zone. The primary types of soils are sedimentary, formed on gabbroic rocks, and the area has a dense hydrographic network with the Mat river being the primary source.

The presence of Ulza and Shkopet lakes in the area has created unique water habitats of great importance to the local biodiversity. The ecosystem has national and international importance for its flora and fauna, which include different types of forests and water habitats, such as black oak forests, thermophilic oak forests, mountainous and sub-alpine oak forests, and rocky habitats. The region's favorable geographical location, Mediterranean climate, and river presence have helped the development of a diverse range of habitats.

On January 26, 2022, the park was approved for a change in status from a "municipal natural park" to a "natural park" (category IV of protected areas) as per the International Union for Conservation of Nature.

== Tourism ==
The local government and environmentalists have promoted the park through events such as the Saint Mark celebrations, aimed at highlighting the area's natural and cultural values. Additionally, efforts have been made to promote traditional local produce and agricultural products to support the park's economy.

== Gallery ==
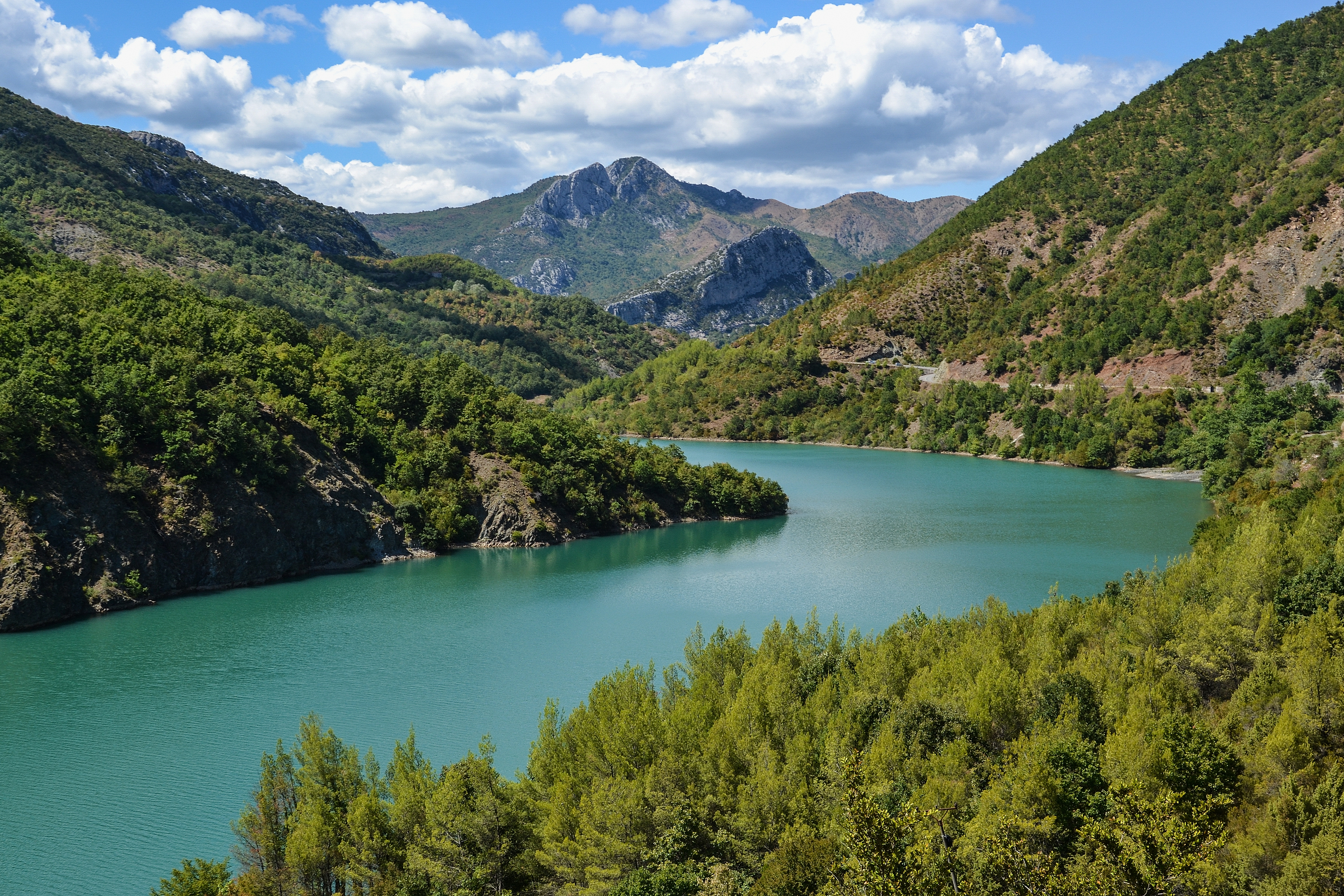
Lake Shkopet

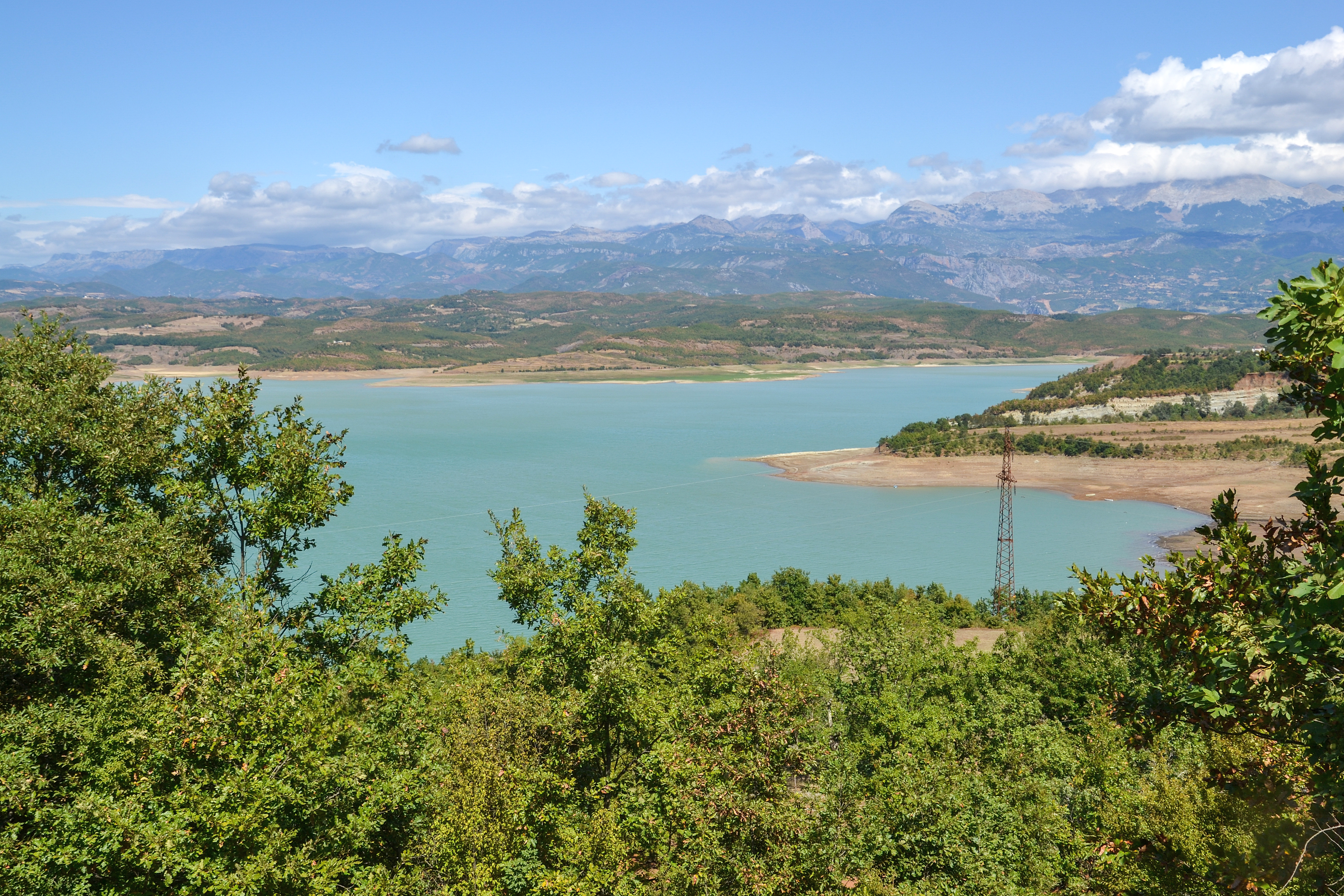
Lake Ulzë

== See also ==
- Mat (river)
- Shkopet Hydroelectric Power Station
- Protected areas of Albania
- Geography of Albania
- Burrel
