= Burrel (town) =

- Administrative unit
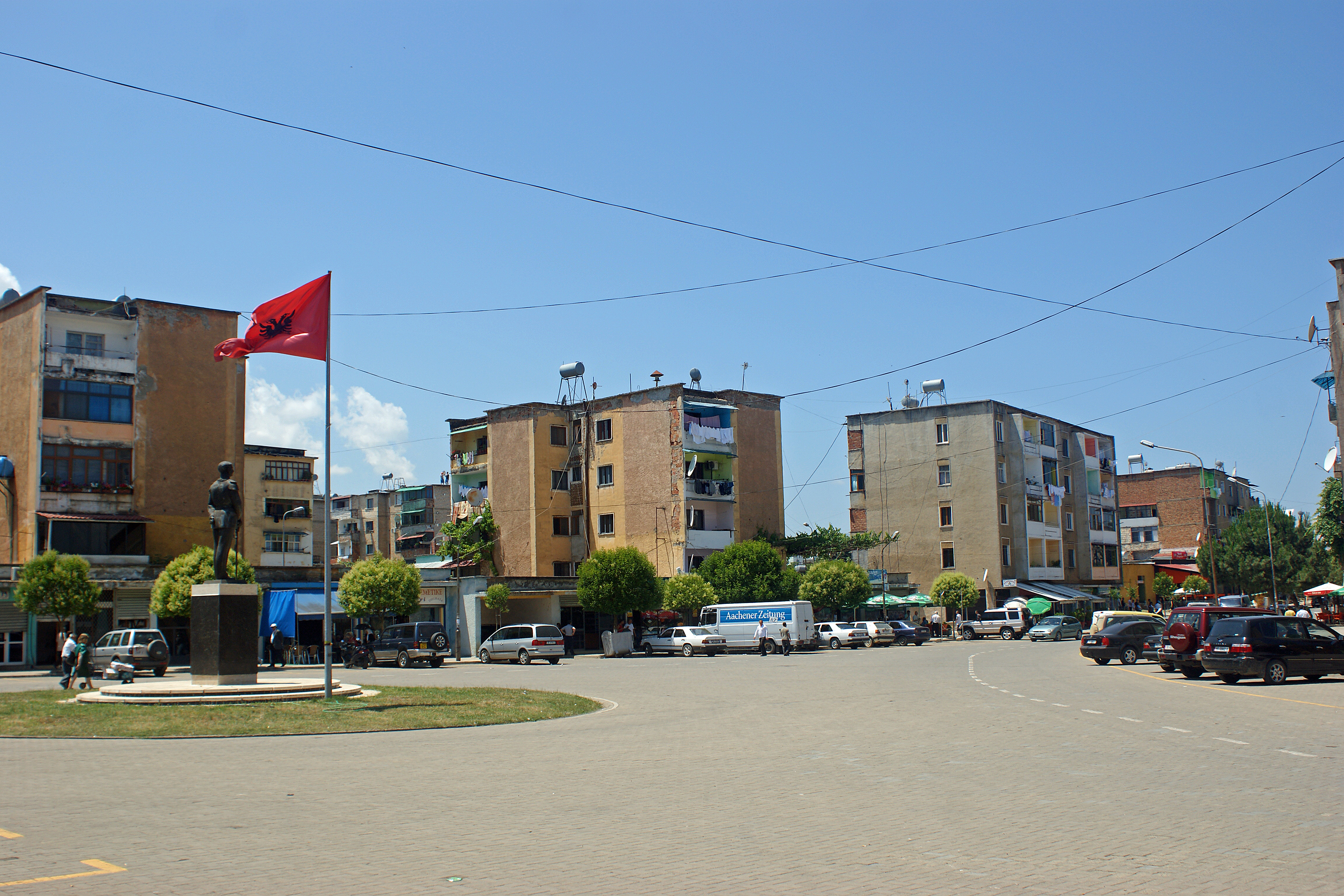
- Burrel City Center

- Location within Albania
- Coordinates: 41°36′30″N 20°00′40″E
- Country: Albania
- County: Dibër
- Municipality: Mat

Government
  - Mayor: Agron Malaj
  - Administrative unit: 2.24 km^{2} (0.86 sq mi)
- Elevation: 316 m (1,037 ft)

Population (2023)
  - Administrative unit: 7,928
  - Administrative unit density: 3,540/km^{2} (9,170/sq mi)
- Time zone: UTC+1 (CET)
  - Summer (DST): UTC+2 (CEST)
- Postal Code: 8001
- Area Code: 0217

Burrel (alternate forms Burrel, Mat) is a town in Diber country in the northern region of Albania, 91 km from Tirana. At the 2015 local government reform it became a subdivision and the seat of the municipality Mat. It was the seat of the former District of Mat. The population as of the 2023 census is 7,928.

== History ==
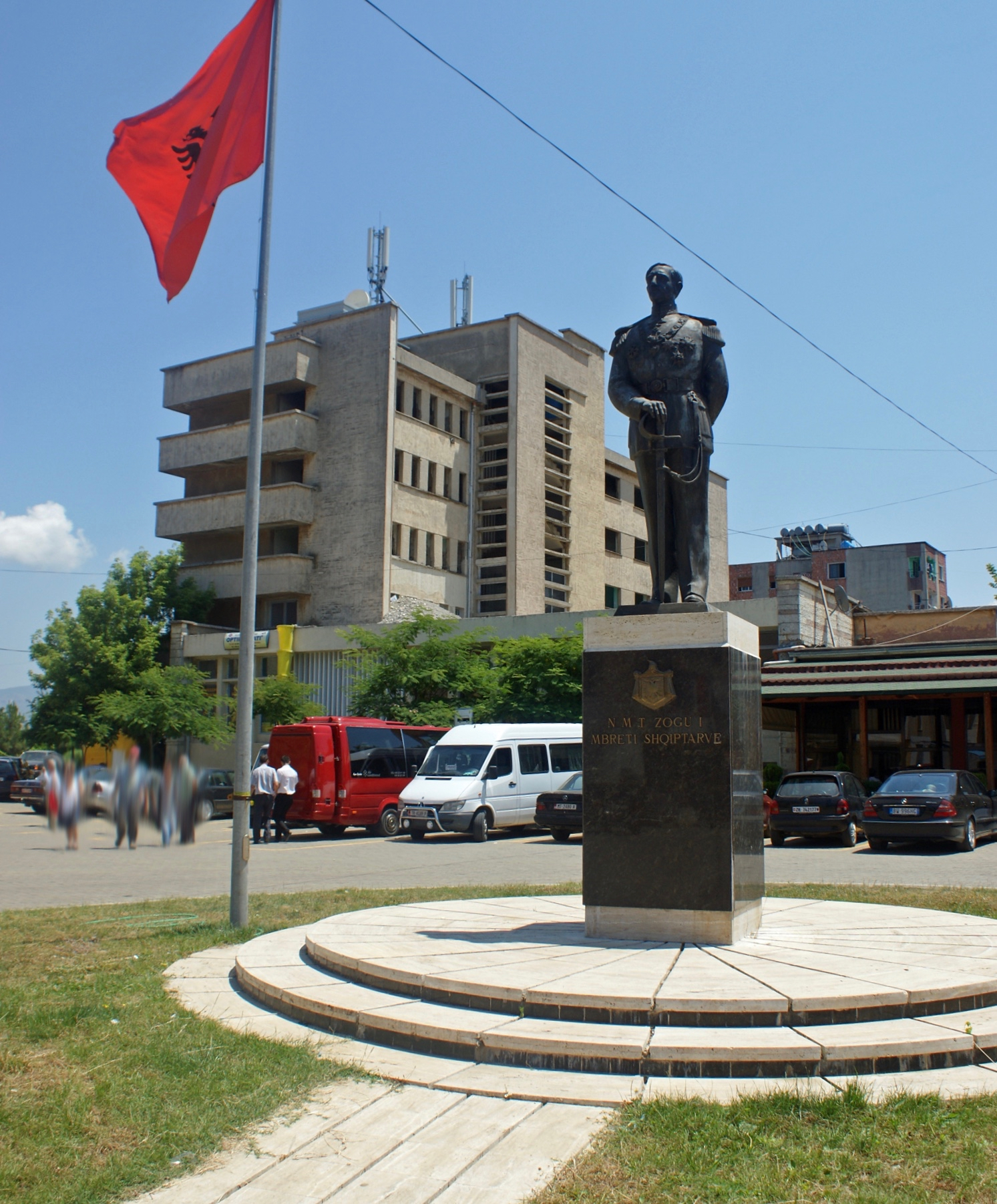
King Zog's monument in the center of Burrel

The last archaeological researches has explored different trails which demonstrate the population of the area from the Paleolithic era. The valley of Mati, has been populated during all the historic periods. In antiquity the region was inhabited by various Illyrian populations including the Pirustae. In second century BC the region came under Roman control.

A famous native of Burrel was Ahmet Zogu, first King of the Albanians (born Ahmet Zogolli, later changed to Ahmet Zogu; 8 October 1895 – 9 April 1961), who reigned as King Zog I from 1928 to 1939. He had previously been a Prime Minister of Albania between 1922 and 1924 and President of Albania between 1925 and 1928.

At one time, Burrel was referred to as the "city of apples" because of the apple trees that lined many of the town's streets, however, during the time of the Communist regime and the unrest following the change of government, the apple trees were cut down for profit or personal use as firewood. There are hardly any apple trees left in the town now.

Burrel was a miners' town during Communist Albania, but the mines closed, with the exception of a ferrochrome plant still operational near Burrel.

During the Kosovo conflict there was a refugee camp near Burrel for 2,000 people. With food and water and supplies from NATO and United States Armed Forces.

== Demographic history ==
Historical population
Year	Pop.	±%
1955	2,141	—
1960	2,577	+20.4%
1969	3,700	+43.6%
1979	6,400	+73.0%
1989	10,343	+61.6%
2001	12,123	+17.2%
2011	10,862	−10.4%
2023	7,928	−27.0%

Burrel (Burjil) is recorded in the Ottoman defter of 1467 as a settlement belonging to the timar of the local Albanians Kali Gjergji, Gjonima, Gjergji, and Todori in the vilayet of Mati. The village had a total of six households which were represented by the following household heads: Tanush Shurbi, Abati Gjergj, Andrija Riçi, Gjergj Aleksi, Peter Shpani, and Gjon Skura.

== Prison of Burrel ==
The city used to be the site of one of the most terrible prisons of the communist regime, where both ordinary criminals and political prisoners such as Bashkim Shehu and Fatos Lubonja or the Catholic priest Dom Simon Jubani were held. Another famous inmate was Pjetër Arbnori, later to become a member of the free Albanian Parliament. Arbnori was known as "the Mandela of the Balkans" because of the length of his internment, which lasted for over 28 years. It was one of the Labor camps in the PSRA. The political prisoners used to be condemned for attempts at overthrowing the state or anti-communist propaganda and agitation, for terms of at least 20 years. Often they were re-condemned while in prison. After the fall of the communist regime, the government of the Democratic Party of Albania closed the prison and made it a museum. However, in 1997, Sali Berisha re-opened it as an active prison.

== Archaeology ==
Mati is of real archaeological importance and an ancient cradle of the Illyrian culture. Dilaver Kurti explored objects which demonstrate facts for all ancient historic periods. The Museum of Mat displays many artifacts of the Illyrians and also displays and analysies the book Trashigime Iliro-Arberore by Dilaver Kurti. Kurti also traveled from village to village collecting ethnographic materials and photographs which make up the material of his books Shenime Etnografike Neper Mat and Foklor Nga Mati.

== Sports ==
Klubi Sportiv Burreli (KS Burreli) is an Albanian football (soccer) club based in Burrel. Its home stadium is Liri Ballabani Stadium, also known as the Burreli Stadium, which has a capacity of 3,000 visitors. Founded in 1952 under the name "KS 31 Korriku Burrel", the club first participated in the Albanian First Division in 1982. As of the 2022–2023 season, KS Burreli finished in 10th place, while playing in the Kategoria e Parë.

== Climate ==
Climate data for Burrel
Month	Jan	Feb	Mar	Apr	May	Jun	Jul	Aug	Sep	Oct	Nov	Dec	Year
Mean daily maximum °C (°F)	7.3 (45.1)	9.1 (48.4)	12.6 (54.7)	16.8 (62.2)	21.7 (71.1)	25.9 (78.6)	28.4 (83.1)	28.4 (83.1)	24.3 (75.7)	18.6 (65.5)	13.1 (55.6)	8.9 (48.0)	17.9 (64.3)
Daily mean °C (°F)	3.9 (39.0)	5.5 (41.9)	8.3 (46.9)	12.1 (53.8)	16.6 (61.9)	20.5 (68.9)	22.7 (72.9)	22.6 (72.7)	18.8 (65.8)	14.0 (57.2)	9.5 (49.1)	5.6 (42.1)	13.3 (56.0)
Mean daily minimum °C (°F)	0.5 (32.9)	1.9 (35.4)	4.0 (39.2)	7.4 (45.3)	11.5 (52.7)	15.2 (59.4)	17.1 (62.8)	16.8 (62.2)	13.4 (56.1)	9.4 (48.9)	5.9 (42.6)	2.3 (36.1)	8.8 (47.8)
Average precipitation mm (inches)	137 (5.4)	125 (4.9)	108 (4.3)	99 (3.9)	90 (3.5)	59 (2.3)	42 (1.7)	47 (1.9)	80 (3.1)	113 (4.4)	161 (6.3)	152 (6.0)	1,213 (47.7)

== Notable people ==
- Tarhoncu Ahmed Pasha - Ottoman Grand Vizier
- Ador Gjuci - football player
- Kurt Agë Kadiu - one of the signatories of the Albanian Declaration of Independence
- Hysni Milloshi - Communist
- Juliana Pasha - singer
- Saimir Patushi - football player
- Zog I of Albania - king of Albania from 1928 to 1939
- Xhelal Bey Zogu - Albanian prince
- Xhemal Pasha Zogu - father of Zog I of Albania
- Rexhep Pasha Mati - Marshal, Governor and War Minister
- Armando Dobra - Albanian footballer
- Elgit Doda - Albanian singer

== See also ==
- Ulëz Lake Regional Nature Park
- List of cities in Albania
