= Ulez =

Ulez or ULEZ may refer to:

- Ułęż, a village in Poland
  - Gmina Ułęż, the administrative unit
- Ulëz, a town in Albania
  - Ulëz Hydroelectric Power Station
- Ultra Low Emission Zone in London, England
