= Postbllok Memorial =

Installation memorial in Tirana

- Artist: Fatos Lubonja, Ardian Isufi
- Year: 2013
- Location: Tirana, Albania; 41°19′15″N 19°49′12″E

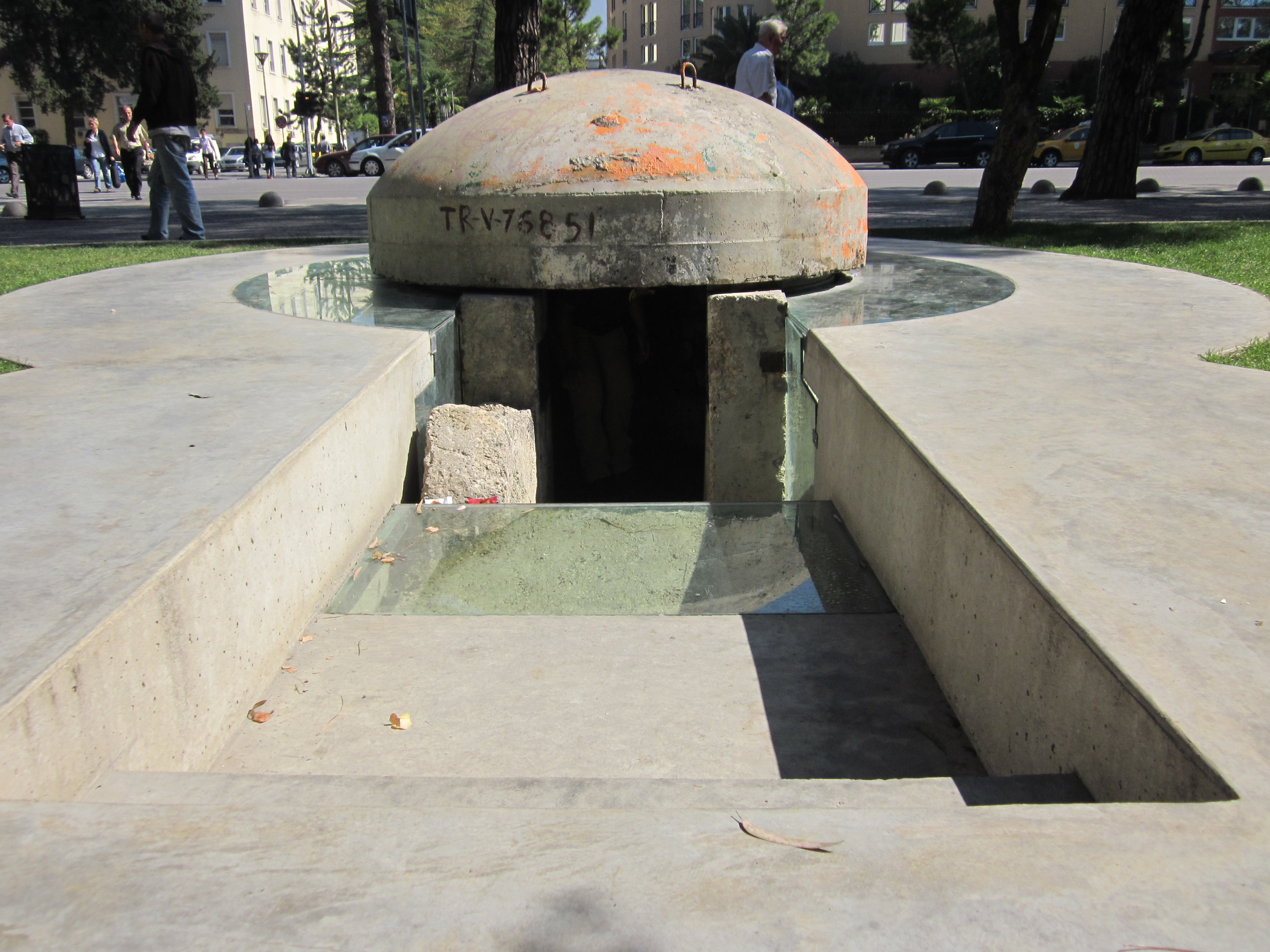
Bunker

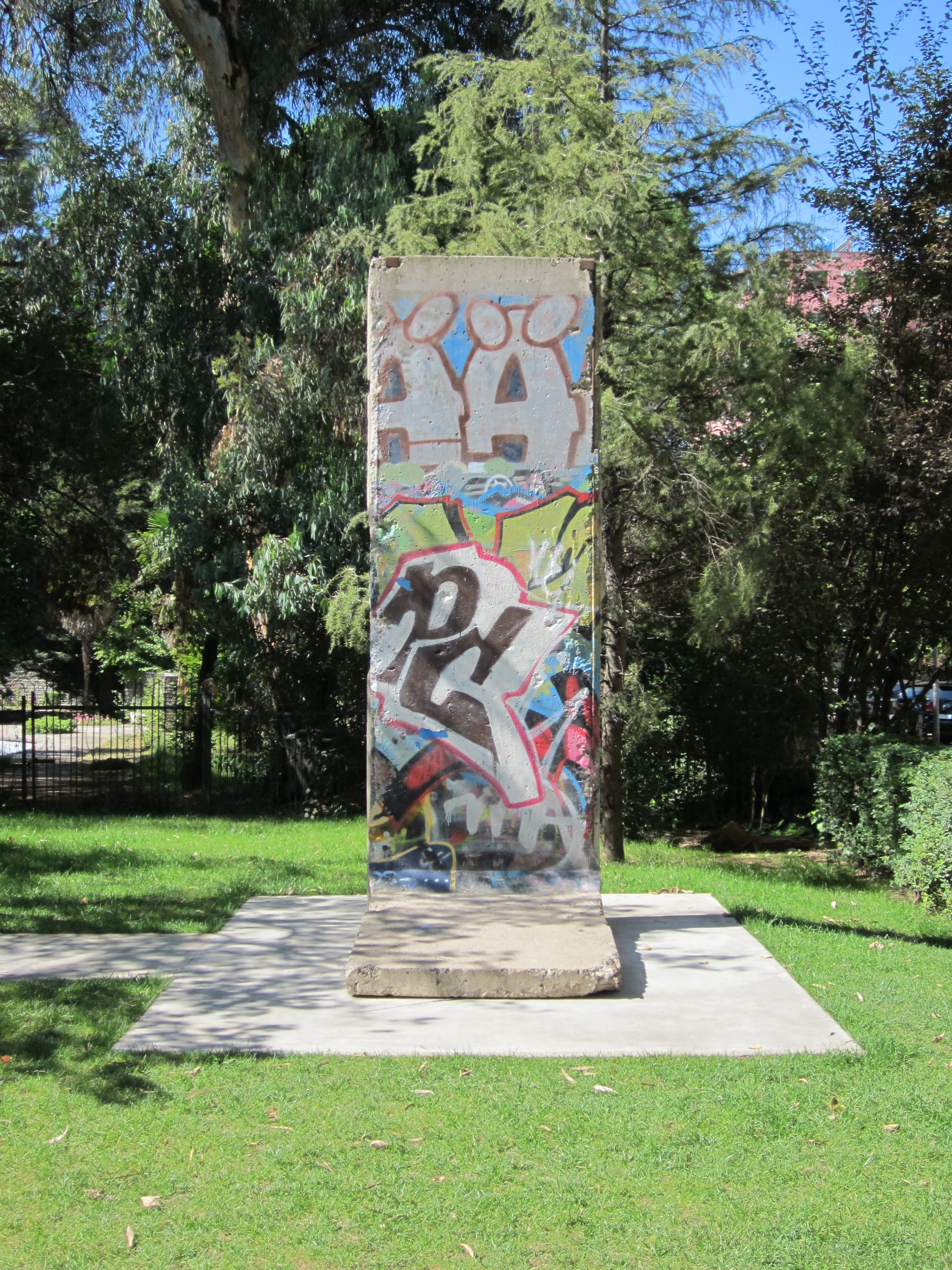
Berlin Wall

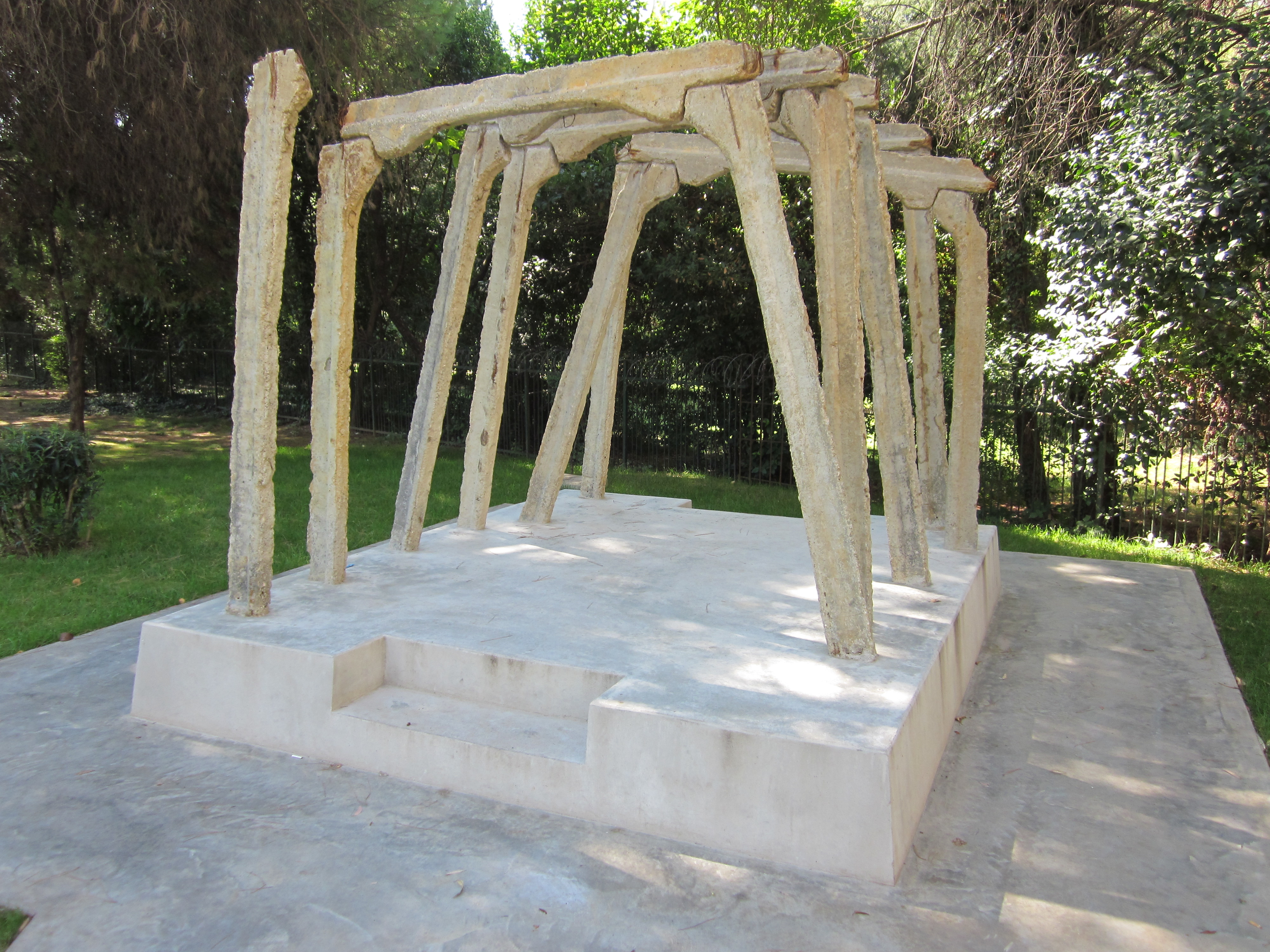
Prison girders

The Postbllok Memorial is a work of installation art by writer Fatos Lubonja and artist Ardian Isufi.

It is a memorial to the atrocities of the People's Socialist Republic of Albania and opened on March 26, 2013, on Dëshmorët e Kombit Boulevard in Tirana.

== Location ==
The memorial is located near a statue of Ismail Qemali in the neighborhood where the nomenklatura built their dachas, and in fact is in what was once the garden of the dacha of Mehmet Shehu.

== Description and symbolism ==
The Postbllok Memorial includes three pieces. One is a set of concrete girders taken from Spaç Prison, where Lubonja was imprisoned for a time. The girders are lined up in a row as they would have been in the halls of the Prison.

The second object is a bunker portion of the memorial, one of the main symbols of the dictatorship.

The third element is a piece of the Berlin Wall, meant to symbolize Albania's isolation, which was a gift from the state government of Berlin to the City of Tirana.
