= Përpjekja =

Albanian quarterly culture and literary magazine

- Editor: Fatos Lubonja
- Categories: Culture magazine Literary magazine
- Frequency: Quarterly
- Publisher: Perpjekja Center
- Founder: Fatos Lubonja
- Founded: 1994; 31 years ago
- Country: Albania
- Based in: Tirana
- Language: Albanian
- OCLC: 36069583

Përpjekja (Albanian for Endeavor) is a quarterly Albanian language culture and literary journal founded in 1994 in Tirana, Albania by writer and former political prisoner Fatos Lubonja, who also acts as the editor. Published by the Përpjekja Center, the magazine is known for its role in shaping post-communist intellectual debate in Albania, featuring literary works, cultural criticism and analyses of political and social development, along with translations of major contemporary thinkers.

== History and profile ==
Përpjekja was first published in 1994. Conceived as an independent forum for critical reflection, the magazine drew inspiration from early twentieth-century Albanian cultural periodicals including Faik Konica's Albania and Branko Merxhani's Albanian Endeavour. Its editorial direction reflects founder Fatos Lubonja's commitment to democratic values, open debate, and the critical examination of Albanian society

The journal publishes short stories, poetry and essays about literary and cultural criticism, and analytical articles addressing developments in Albania. It also features translations and discussions of notable contemporary philosophers and intellectuals, including Jürgen Habermas, George Steiner and Adam Michnik. Through its mix of original writing and translated essays, Përpjekja has played a notable role in post-communist cultural debate.

Frequent contributors have included Bashkim Shehu, Edi Rama, Ardian Klosi, and Shkëlzen Maliqi along with other writers and scholars from Albania and Kosovo. In the late 1990's the magazine published commentary on the collapse of Albania's pyramid schemes and the unrest of 1996-1997, drawing on both local analyses and translated materials.

Early issues of Përpjekja received financial support from the Open Society Foundation for Albania, which also funded the translation of selected writings into English in 1997 and supported later editions.

== See also ==
- List of magazines in Albania
