= Mat (river) =

River in Albania

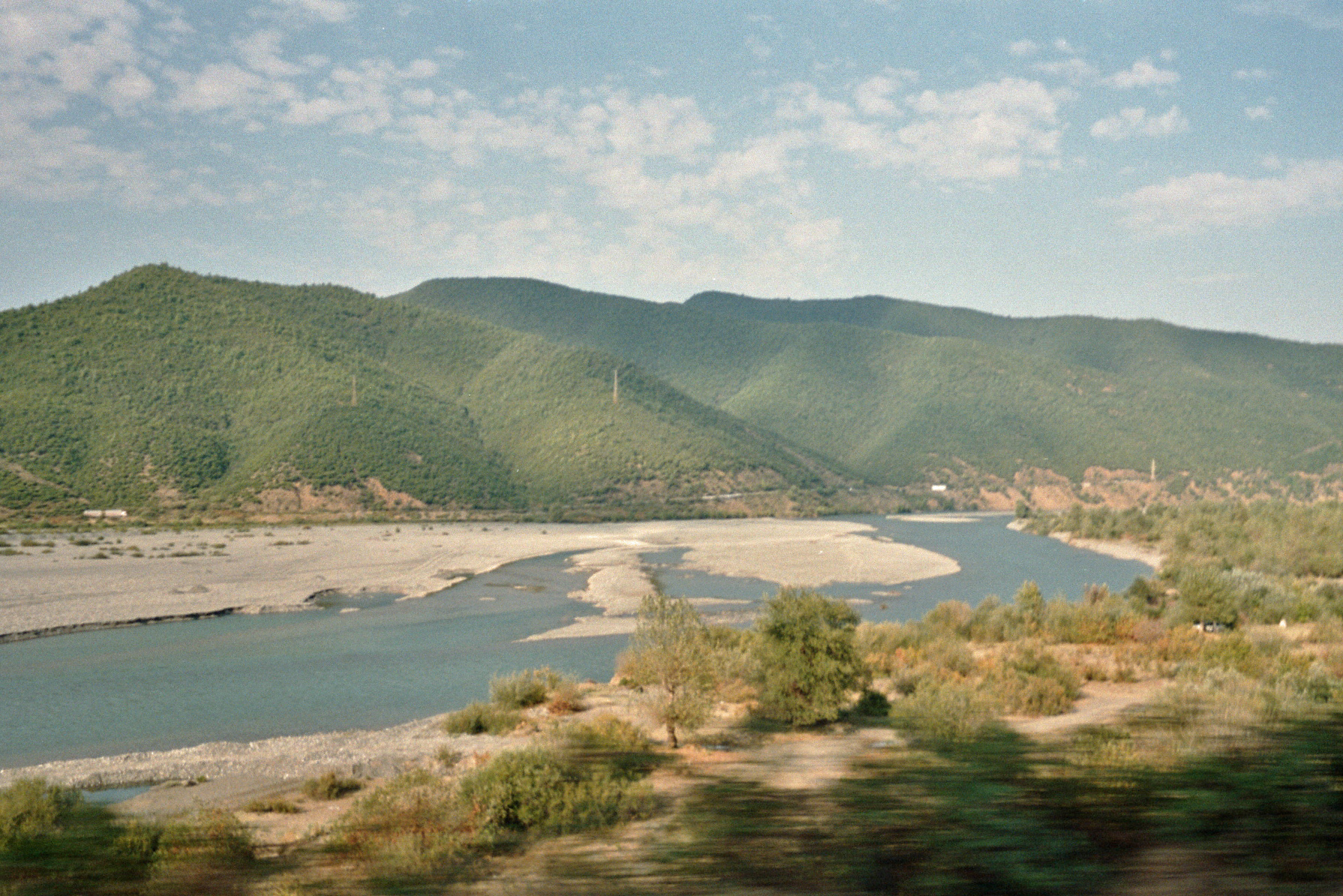
- Mat river

Location
- Country: Albania

Physical characteristics
- Mouth: Adriatic Sea
  - coordinates: 41°38′12″N 19°34′17″E
  - elevation: 0 m (0 ft)
- Length: 115 km (71 mi)
- Basin size: 2,441 km^{2} (942 sq mi)
- Discharge
  - average: 103 m^{3}/s (3,600 cu ft/s)

The Mat (Albanian definite form: Mati) is a river in north-central Albania. Its overall length is 115 km (71 mi), while its catchment surface is 2,441 km^{2} (942 sq mi). Its average discharge is 103 m^{3}/s (3,600 cu ft/s). The main tributary is the Fan, flowing from the northeast, while the Mat flows from the southwest down to the confluence with Fan and then towards the Adriatic Sea.

== Etymology ==
The Albanian name mat originally meant "elevated location", "mountain place". Today's meaning in Albanian, "river bank, river shore", is a consequence of a secondary change through the common use of both the terms mal, "mountain" and breg, "shore", giving the meaning of "elevation". The river was recorded by Roman writer Vibius Sequester (4th or 5th century AD) as Mathis, following a hellenized graphic mode of the term mat. It appeared in written records also as Mathia in 1380.

== Course ==
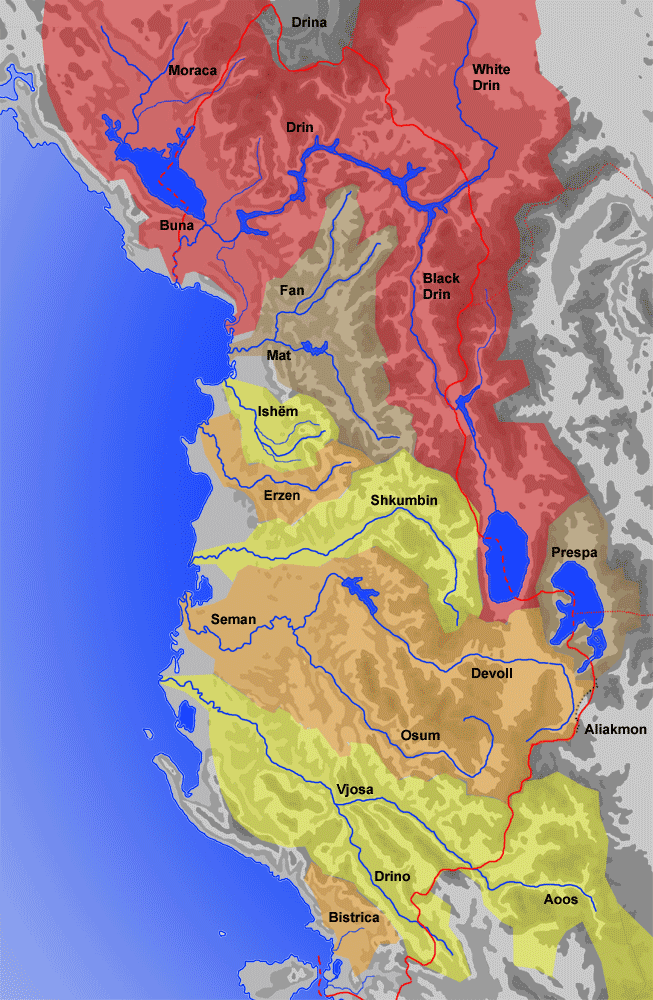
Hydrographic map of Albania

The Mat originates from the confluence of several streams within the karstic mountains in Martanesh, where it forms deep gorges and canyons. Rising in Martanesh, the Mat heads westwards to the town of Klos and then northwest by the town of Burrel. About 10 km (6 mi) downstream from Burrel, it flows into lake Ulëz. After passing through the Ulëz dam, it flows through another lake, Shkopet, dammed again by the Shkopet Hydroelectric Power Station forming a narrow gorge through the mountain range that separates Mat from the coastal plains. It enters the plains between Milot and Zejmen.

After a total length of 115 km (71 mi), the Mat flows into the Adriatic Sea near Fushë-Kuqe, between the towns of Lezhë and Laç.

== Gallery ==
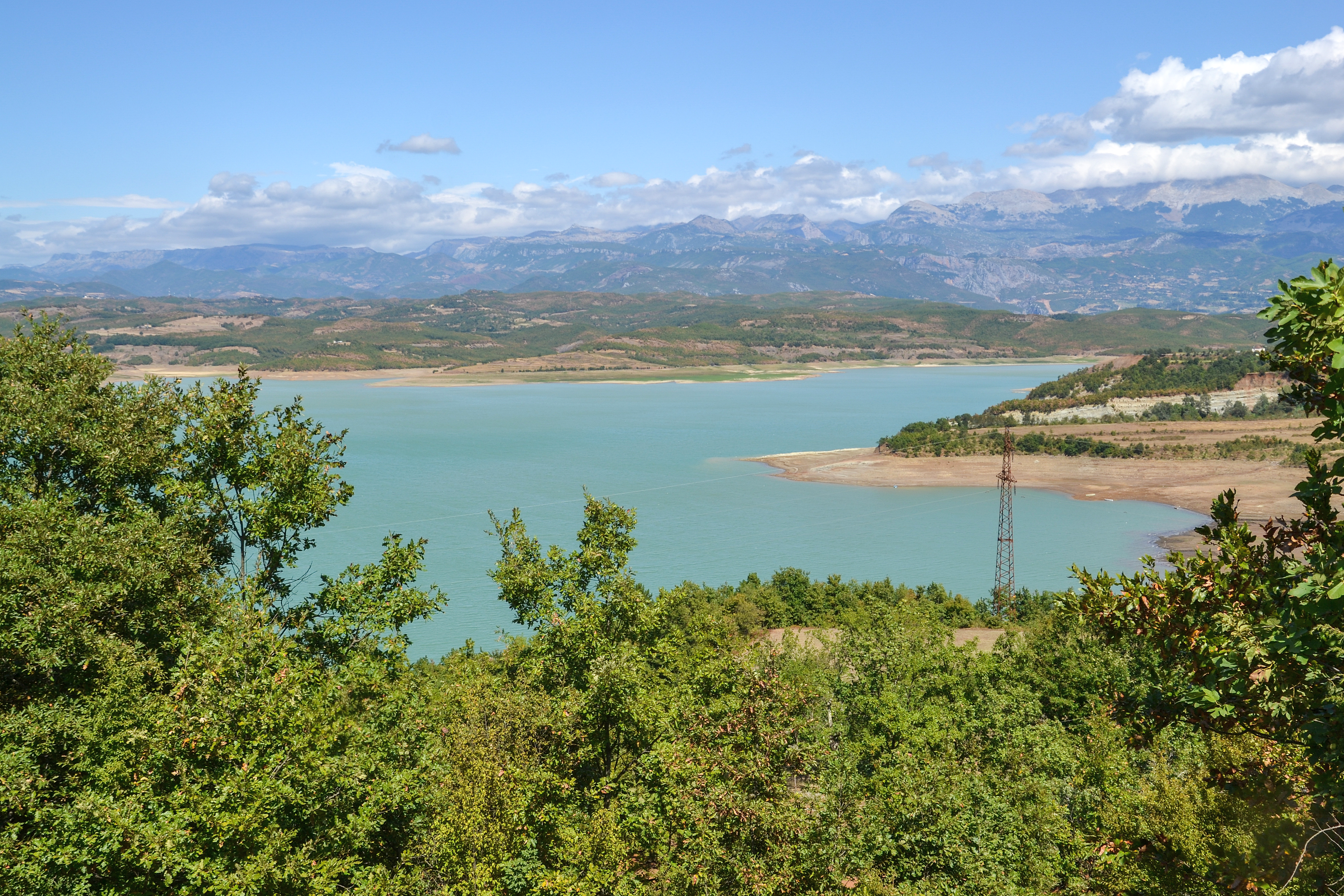
Lake Ulzë

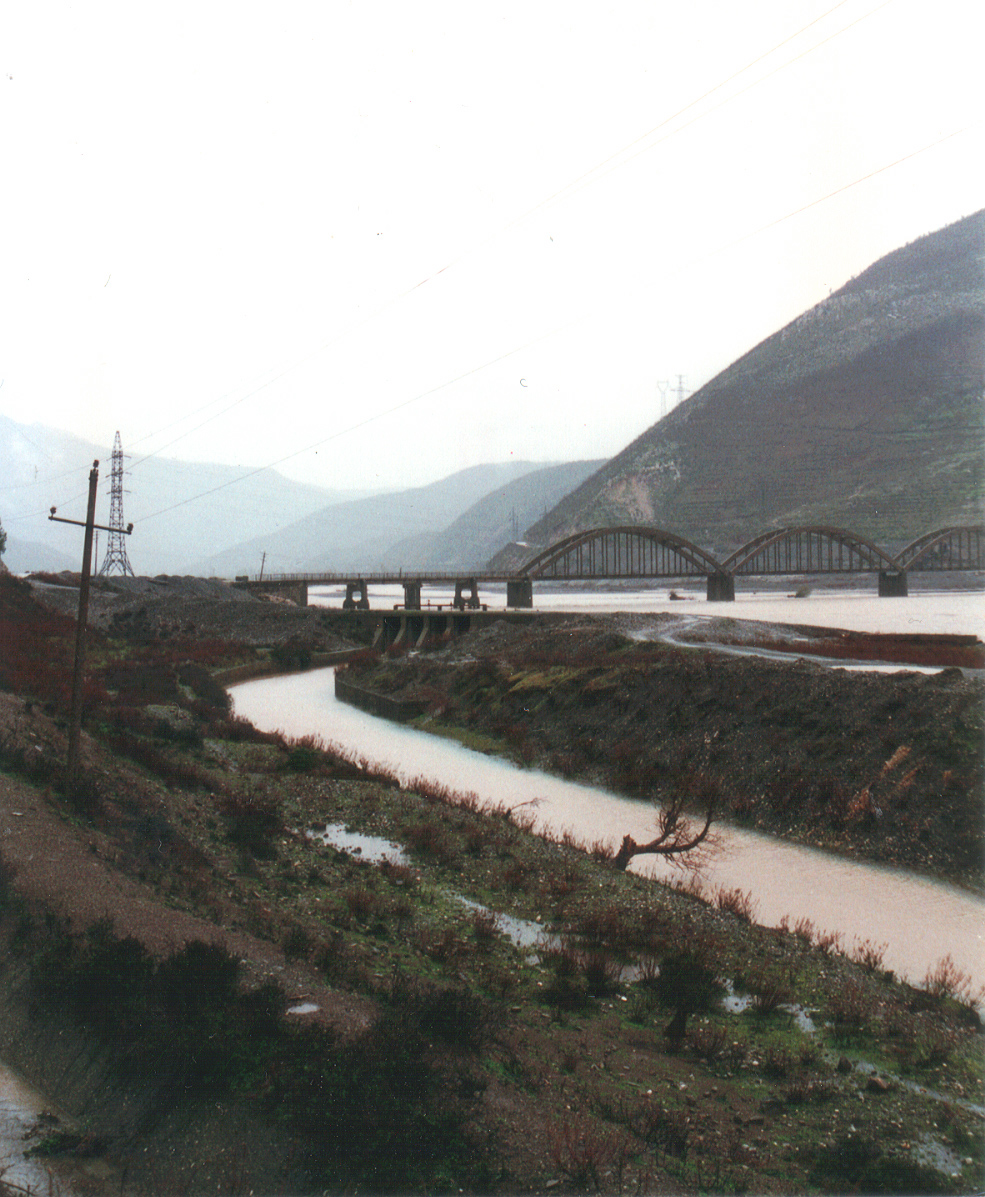
Zog Bridge at the beginning of the coastal plains

== See also ==
- Mat (region)
- Mat (municipality)
- Klos (municipality)
- Burrel
- Geography of Albania
- Central Mountain Range
- List of rivers of Albania

== Sources ==
=== Bibliography ===
- Elsie, Robert (2010). Historical Dictionary of Albania (PDF). Historical Dictionaries of Europe. Vol. 75 (2nd ed.). Scarecrow Press. p. 255. ISBN 978-0-8108-6188-6. Archived from the original (PDF) on 6 October 2014.
- Matzinger, Joachim (2009). "Shqiptarët si pasardhës të ilirëve nga këndvështrimi i gjuhësisë historike". In Schmitt, Oliver Jens; Frantz, Eva Anne (eds.). Historia e Shqiptarëve: Gjendja dhe perspektivat e studimeve (in Albanian). Translated by Pandeli Pani and Artan Puto. Botime Përpjekja. ISBN 978-99943-0-254-3.
