= Jubani =

Jubani is a surname. Notable people with the surname include:

- Dom Simon Jubani (1927–2011), Catholic priest and Albanian political prisoner
- Zef Jubani (1818–1880), Albanian folklorist, philosopher, and activist
