= Enemy of the people =

Designation for political opponents of ruling power

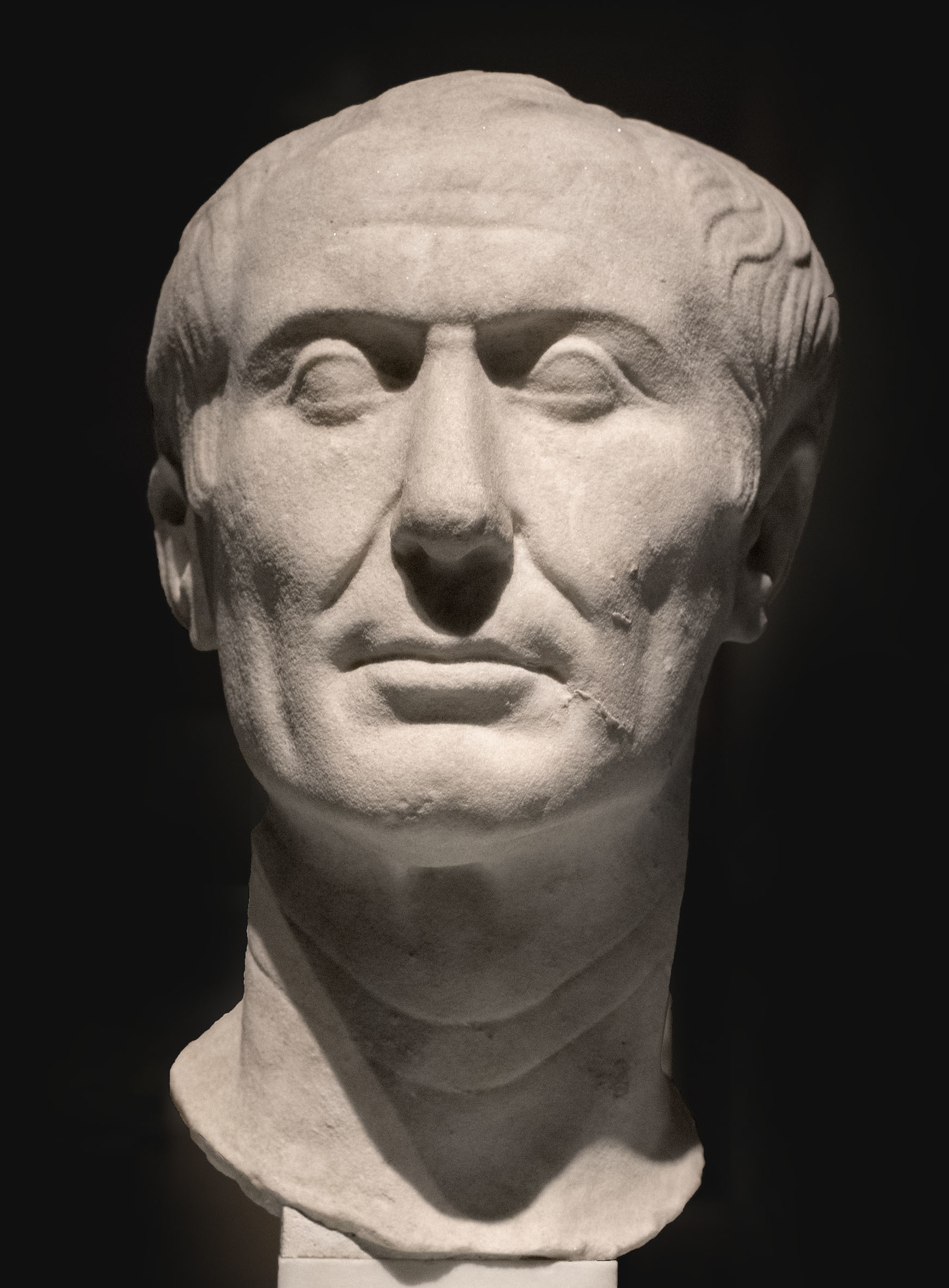
In the year 49 BC, the Roman Senate declared Julius Caesar the enemy of the people of Rome (hostis publicus).

The terms enemy of the people and enemy of the nation are designations for the political opponents and the social-class opponents of the power group within a larger social unit, who, thus identified, can be subjected to political repression.

Like the term enemy of the state, the term enemy of the people originated and derives from the Latin: hostis publicus, a public enemy of the Roman Empire. In literature, the term enemy of the people features in the title of the stageplay An Enemy of the People (1882), by Henrik Ibsen, and is a theme in the stageplay Coriolanus (1605), by William Shakespeare.

== Origins ==
=== Imperial Rome ===
The expression enemy of the people dates to Imperial Rome. The Senate declared Emperor Nero a hostis publicus in 68 AD. The direct translation of the phrase is "public enemy".

=== French Revolution ===
The words ennemi du peuple were used extensively during the French Revolution. On 25 December 1793 Robespierre stated: "The revolutionary government owes to the good citizen all the protection of the nation; it owes nothing to the Enemies of the People but death". The Law of 22 Prairial in 1794 extended the remit of the Revolutionary Tribunal to punish "enemies of the people", with some political crimes punishable by death, including "[t]hose who have disseminated false news in order to divide or disturb the people."

== Marxist–Leninist states ==
=== Soviet Union ===
The Soviet Union made extensive use of the term "enemy of the people". In June 1917, Vladimir Lenin published an article About the Enemies of the People, commenting on Plekhanovite's invocation of the usage of the term during the French Revolution. The Petrograd Military Revolutionary Committee printed lists of "enemies of the people", and Lenin invoked it in his decree of 28 November 1917:

...all leaders of the Constitutional Democratic Party, a party filled with enemies of the people, are hereby to be considered outlaws, and are to be arrested immediately and brought before the revolutionary court.

Other similar terms were in use as well:

- enemy of the labourers (враг трудящихся, vrag trudyashchikhsya)
- enemy of the proletariat (враг пролетариата, vrag proletariata)
- class enemy (классовый враг, klassovyi vrag), etc.

The term "enemy of the people" was used in the 1936 Constitution of the Soviet Union, in Article 131 about public property: "Persons who encroach on public, socialist property are enemies of the people."

The term "enemy of the workers" was formalized in Article 58, and similar articles in the codes of the other Soviet Republics.

At various times these terms were applied, in particular, to Tsar Nicholas II and the Imperial family, aristocrats, the bourgeoisie, clerics, business entrepreneurs, anarchists, kulaks, monarchists, Mensheviks, Esers, Bundists, Trotskyists, Bukharinists, the "old Bolsheviks", the army and police, emigrants, saboteurs, wreckers (вредители, "vrediteli"), "social parasites" (тунеядцы, "tuneyadtsy"), Kavezhedists (people who administered and serviced the Chinese Eastern Railway, abbreviated KVZhD, particularly the Russian population of Harbin, China), and those considered bourgeois nationalists (notably Russian, Ukrainian, Belarusian, Armenian, Lithuanian, Latvian, and Estonian nationalists, as well as Zionists and the Basmachi movement).

After 1927, Article 20 of the Common Part of the penal code that listed possible "measures of social defence" had the following item 20a: "declaration to be an enemy of the workers with deprivation of the union republic citizenship and hence of the USSR citizenship, with obligatory expulsion from its territory".

==== Rejection of the phrase ====
On 25 February 1956, Nikita Khrushchev delivered a speech to the Communist Party in which he claimed that Stalin was the author of the phrase and distanced himself from it, saying that it made debate impossible. "This term automatically made it unnecessary that the ideological errors of a man or men engaged in a controversy be proven," Khrushchev said. "It made possible the use of the cruelest repression, violating all norms of [...] legality, against anyone who in any way disagreed with Stalin, against those who were only suspected of hostile intent, against those who had bad reputations ... The formula ‘enemy of the people’ was specifically introduced for the purpose of physically annihilating such individuals."

For decades afterwards, the phrase "was so omnipresent, freighted and devastating in its use under Stalin that nobody [in Russia] wanted to touch it. ... except in reference to history and in jokes", according to William Taubman in his biography of Khrushchev.

=== Cambodia and China ===
According to Philip Short, an author of biographies of Mao Zedong and Cambodia's Khmer Rouge leader Pol Pot, in domestic political struggles Chinese and Cambodian communists rarely if ever used the phrase "enemy of the people" as they were very nationalistic and saw it as an alien import.

In 1957, in the speech and in the essay On the Correct Handling of Contradictions Among the People, Mao said that: "At the present stage, the period of building socialism, the classes, strata and social groups which favour, support and work for the cause of socialist construction all come within the category of the people, while the social forces and groups which resist the socialist revolution and are hostile to or sabotage socialist construction are all enemies of the people."

=== Albania ===
Enemy of the people (Alb: Armiku i popullit) in Albania were the enemy typology of the Communist Albanian government used to denounce political or class opponents. The term is today considered totalitarian, derogatory and hostile. There are still some politicians who use the term on political opponents with the intention of dehumanization.

After the communist takeover, many who were labeled with this term were executed or imprisoned. Enver Hoxha declared religious leaders, landowners, disloyal party officials, clerics and clan leaders as "enemies of the people". This is said to have led to the death of 6,000 people. Thousands were sentenced to death. From 1945 to 1992, around 5,000 men and women were executed and close to 100,000 were sent to prison as they were labeled enemies of the people. Many who were targeted held important leadership positions in the party and state structures of the regime. Hoxha also used the term against the Soviet Union and the US when he spoke: "as to ’Albania being only one mouthful’, watch out, gentlemen, for socialist Albania is a hard bone that will stick in your throat and choke you!". On 1 June 1945, The Albanian Central Commission for the Discovery of Crimes, of War Criminals and Enemies of the People requested the International Commission for the Discovery of Crimes and War Criminals to hand over a number of Albanian war criminals found in concentration camps in Italy such as Bari, Lecce, Salerno and others. In 1954, Hoxha condemned the American and British liberation of Albania calling them "enemies of the people". In the 1960s, many Albanian migrants returned from Austria and Italy after having fled in the 1940s, and despite having been promised not to be punished, were immediately arrested as "enemies of the people". In 1990, Ismail Kadare applied for political asylum in France, which was granted, resulting in him being condemned by Albanian officials as an "enemy of the people".

== Nazi Germany ==
Regarding the Nazi plan to relocate all Jews to Madagascar, the Nazi tabloid Der Stürmer wrote that "The Jews don't want to go to Madagascar – They cannot bear the climate. Jews are pests and disseminators of diseases. In whatever country they settle and spread themselves out, they produce the same effects as are produced in the human body by germs. ... In former times sane people and sane leaders of the peoples made short shrift of enemies of the people. They had them either expelled or killed."

== Venezuela ==
During the presidency of Hugo Chávez, the term "enemy of the people" was used against political opponents and critics of his government, particularly private media organizations. In 2001, the United States Department of State reported that Chávez had repeatedly singled out media owners and editors, sometimes calling them "enemies of the revolution" or "enemies of the people". Human Rights Watch similarly reported that, following the 2002 coup attempt, Chávez and his supporters adopted an increasingly adversarial approach toward private media, with Chávez describing media critics as "fascists", "terrorists", "enemies of the people" and other derogatory terms.

In a 9 May 2004 broadcast of Aló Presidente, Chávez said that the owners of several private television networks, including Venevisión, Globovisión and RCTV, could be declared "enemies of the people of Venezuela", accusing them of supporting a coup, terrorism and destabilization. Chávez also used the expression more broadly in political disputes, referring to opponents within the political system as "enemies of the people" and "enemies of the revolution".

== Russia ==
The term returned to post-Soviet Russia in the late 2000s with a number of nationalist and pro-government politicians (most notably Ramzan Kadyrov) calling for restoration of the Soviet approach to the "enemies of the people" defined as all non-system opposition.

On 28 December 2022, Dmitry Medvedev, Deputy Secretary of the Security Council of Russia, said that Russians who fled Russia after the invasion of Ukraine and are opposed to the war should be labeled "enemies of society" and barred from returning to Russia.

== United Kingdom ==
During the aftermath of the 2016 referendum on membership of the European Union, the Daily Mail was criticized for a headline describing judges (in the Miller case) as "Enemies of the People" for ruling that the process for leaving the European Union (i.e. the triggering of Article 50) would require the consent of the British Parliament. The May administration had hoped to use the powers of the royal prerogative to bypass parliamentary approval. The paper issued character assassinations of all the judges involved in the ruling (Lord Chief Justice Lord Thomas, Sir Terence Etherton, and Lord Justice Sales), and received more than 1,000 complaints to the Independent Press Standards Organisation. The Secretary of State for Justice, Liz Truss, issued a three-line statement defending the independence and impartiality of the judiciary, which some saw as inadequate due to the delayed response and failure to condemn the attacks.

== United States ==
=== 1960s ===
In the United States during the 1960s, organizations such as the Black Panther Party and Students for a Democratic Society were known to use the term. In one inter-party dispute in February 1971, for example, Black Panther leader Huey P. Newton denounced two other Panthers as "enemies of the people" for allegedly putting party leaders and members in jeopardy.

=== Donald Trump ===
In 2020 the Committee to Protect Journalists published a special report by Leonard Downie Jr. titled "The Trump Administration and the Media", which mentioned that Trump's verbal attacks included the term "the enemy of the people". From his inauguration in January 2017 through October 15, 2019, Trump called the news media the "enemy of the people" 36 times on Twitter.

== See also ==
- Class struggle
- Ostracism
- Persona non grata
- Public enemy
- Social death
- Struggle session
- Untermensch
