= Ador Gjuci =

Italian-born Albanian footballer (born 1998)

Personal information
- Date of birth: 29 January 1998 (age 28)
- Place of birth: Aversa, Campania, Italy
- Height: 1.82 m (6 ft 0 in)
- Position: Left winger

Team information
- Current team: Portici

Youth career
- –2012: Sassoferrato Genga
- 2012–2014: Reggina
- 2015–2017: Torino

Senior career*
Years	Team	Apps	(Gls)
2014–2015	Reggina	10	(1)
2017–2018	Torino	0	(0)
2017–2018	→ Akragas (loan)	22	(0)
2018–2019	Monterosi	18	(1)
2019–2020	Fano	6	(0)
2020	Torres	7	(3)
2020–2022	Carbonia	55	(11)
2022	Matera	9	(0)
2022–2023	Aprilia	18	(5)
2023–	Portici	6	(0)

International career
2015	Albania U19		
- * Club domestic league appearances and goals as of 20 December 2023

Ador Gjuci (born 29 January 1998) is an Italian-born Albanian footballer who plays as a left-winger for Portici in Serie D. His family is originally from Burrel, Albania.

== Club career ==
=== Early career ===
Gjuci was born in Aversa, Campania, Italy to Albanian parents from Burrel. He grow up as a player at Sassoferrato Genga from where he was signed by Reggina.

He made it his debut for Reggina at the age of 16 and 8 months during a derby match on 5 October 2014 against Cosenza which was won 3–0 by Reggina, becoming the third youngest debutant in the Reggina's history after Vincenzo Camilleri and Giandomenico Mesto. After Roberto Insigne scored his third personal goal and third goal of the match even, the coach Francesco Cozza decided to give Gjuci the great opportunity to make it his professional debut.

On 6 January 2015 he managed to score his first professional goal against Martina Franca after playing as a starter and scored in the 25th minute also to give his side the 1–0 victory.

=== Monterosi ===
On 13 November 2018, he joined Monterosi in Serie D.

=== Fano ===
On 14 August 2019, he returned to Serie C, signing a one-year contract with Fano. On 3 January 2020, his Fano contract was terminated by mutual consent.

== International career ==
In an interview after his debut in Reggina, Gjuci admitted that he wanted to play for Albania at international level and would welcome an invitation by FSHF.

He received his first call up at the Albania national under-19 football team by the coach Arjan Bellaj for a 7 days gathering in Durrës, Albania from 29 August to 5 September 2015.

== Career statistics ==
=== Club ===
As of 9 September 2017

Club	Season	League			Cup		Europe (Note: Including continental competitions, such as UEFA Champions League and UEFA Europa League)		Other		Total	
Club	Season	Division	Apps	Goals	Apps	Goals	Apps	Goals	Apps	Goals	Apps	Goals
Reggina	2014–15	Lega Pro	10	1	—		—		—		10	1
Reggina	Total		10	1	—		—		—		10	1
Akragas	2017–18	Serie C	0	0	—		—		—		0	0
Akragas	Total		0	0	—		—		—		0	0
Career total			10	1	—		—		—		10	1
