= Forced labour camps in Communist Albania =

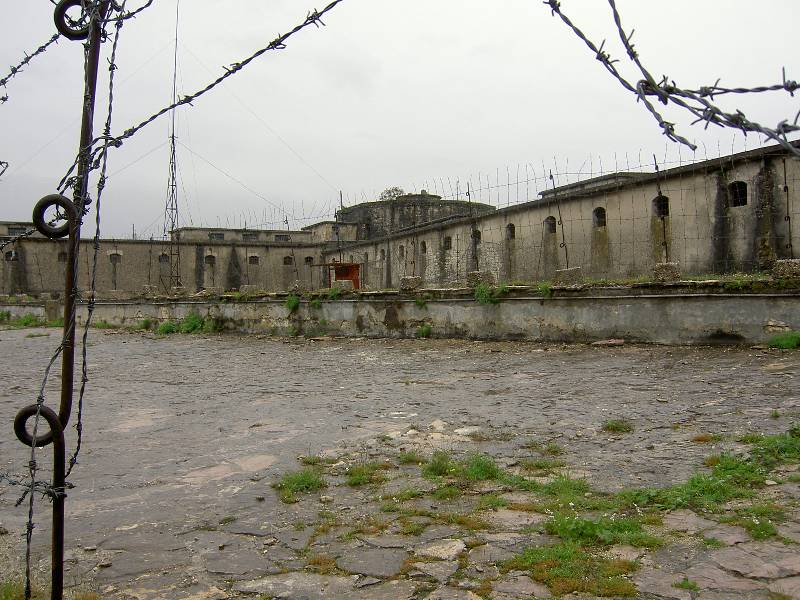
Forced labour camp near Gjirokastër

Jail from inside (1947)

The People's Socialist Republic of Albania maintained labour camps (Albanian: Kampe pune, lit. 'work camps') throughout the territories it controlled. The first Communist Albanian labour camps were around Tirana (although several other camp systems were developed in the north and south of the country as well). A number of camps existed between 1946 and 1991 during the Cold War.

== See also ==
- Spaç Prison
- Burrel Prison
- Valias Camp
- Qafë Bar Prison
