= Qafë Bar Prison =

Political prison in Albania

Qafë Bar
- Location: Qafë Bar, Albania
- Status: Closed
- Security class: Maximum
- Closed: 1991
- Managed by: Communist Albania

The Qafë Bar Prison (Albanian: Burgu i Qafë Barit) was a political prison in Communist Albania at the village of Qafë Bar.

== See also ==
- Forced labour camps in Communist Albania
- Prison of Burrel
