= Valias Internment Camp =

Internment facility modeled after Soviet kolkhozes

The Valias Internment Camp, also known simply as Valias Camp, was an internment facility modeled after Soviet kolkhozes, located in the village of Valias near Tirana. Originally established as a prison camp for captured Nazi soldiers during the war, after 1945 it was transformed into an internment site for regime opponents, political dissidents, and their families.

== History ==
The camp was first established between the years 1945 and 1948 as part of the network of sites used to detain German prisoners of war. It was built next to a large industrial complex and a coal mine near the “Ylli i Kuq” farm in Valias, using tents, stables, and old houses as shelters. It housed both deportees and prisoners who were forced into labor. At first, the camp served as a holding site for so-called “monarcho-fascist Greeks” as well as German prisoners.

Later, it also became a place of internment for the families of political prisoners and those who escaped Albania, primarily women and children.

By 1950, the camp held around 800 internees, half of whom were children or infants. From the detainees in 1950, around 200 of them were German prisoners, who were kept there as individuals whom the regime claimed it was unable to “re-educate politically.”

The facility remained in operation until 1952, when the internees were transferred to other forced labor camps.

== Internment ==
Many of those sent to the Valias Camp had not committed any crime. A large number were targeted simply because of their “bad” background or family history, while others were punished for belonging to a wealthy family before the war. Having relatives abroad or expressing opinions that differed from the party line was often enough to be interned.

In 1952, shortly before its closure, the camp held on average around 400 internees throughout the year. Of these, approximately 120 were men, 190 were women, and about 90 were children.

== Living conditions in the camp ==
Although the number of children in the camp was equivalent to that of a school, they were never given the chance to receive a full education. Schooling was limited and heavily indoctrinated. Prisoners were forced to work in the coal mine, often without even the most basic safety measures and under exploitative, near-slave conditions. Children grew up inside the camp, in an environment that was isolated and tightly controlled.

The internees were put to work in agriculture. A report dated August 13, 1948, records that 89 internees, including children, were made to work three hours a day.
