= Ulëz Hydroelectric Power Station =

Hydroelectric power plant in Ulëz, Albania

Coordinates: 41.680°N 19.894°E

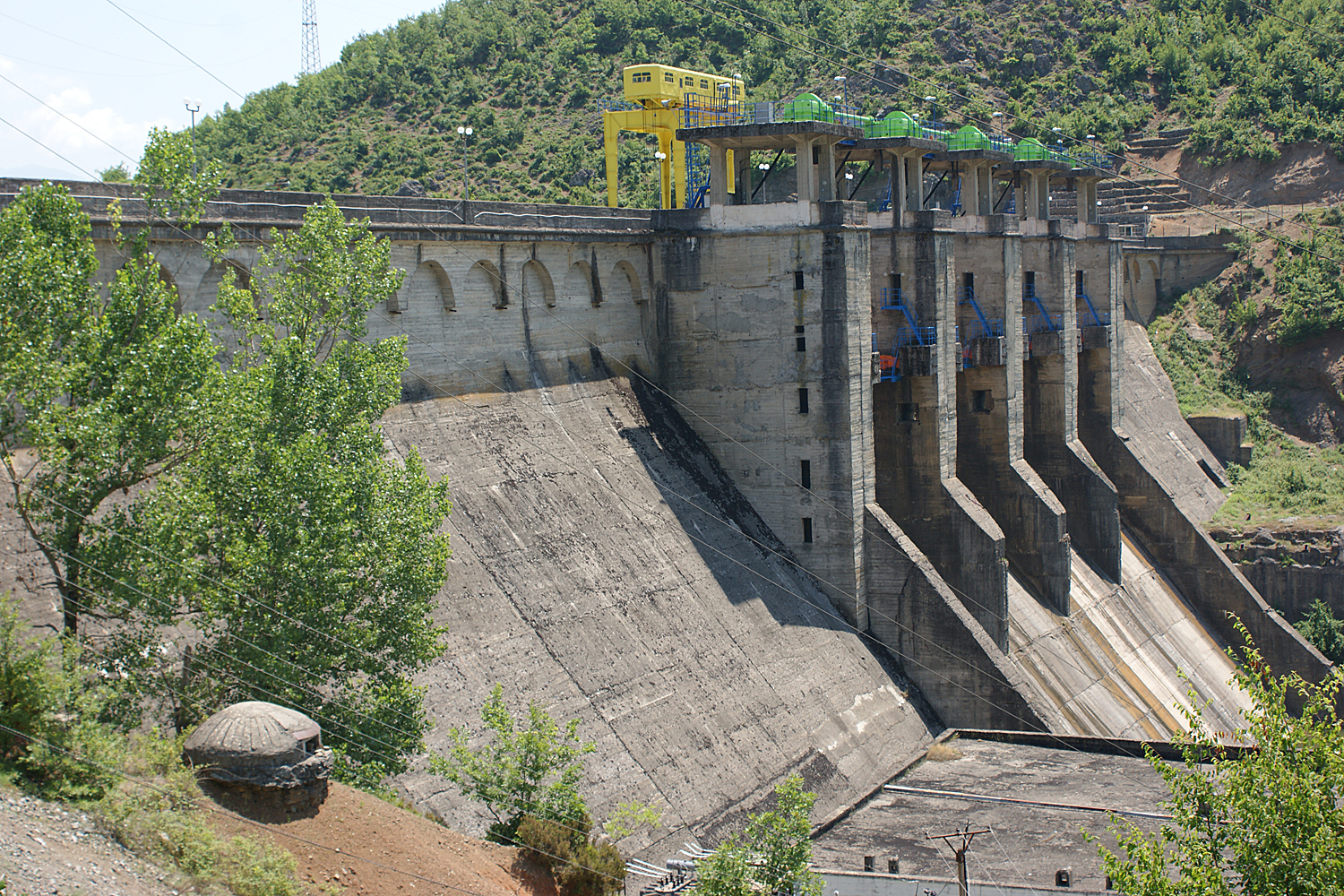
The power station dam on the Mat River, Ulza (or Ulëz), Albania.

The Ulëz Hydroelectric Power Station is a hydroelectric Power Station located near Ulëz, Albania. It has 4 units which were commissioned in 1957. It is operated by Korporata Elektroenergjitike Shqiptare (KESH). Its reservoir is fed and drained by the river Mat.

== See also ==
- List of power stations in Albania
