= Spaç Prison =

Political prison in Communist Albania

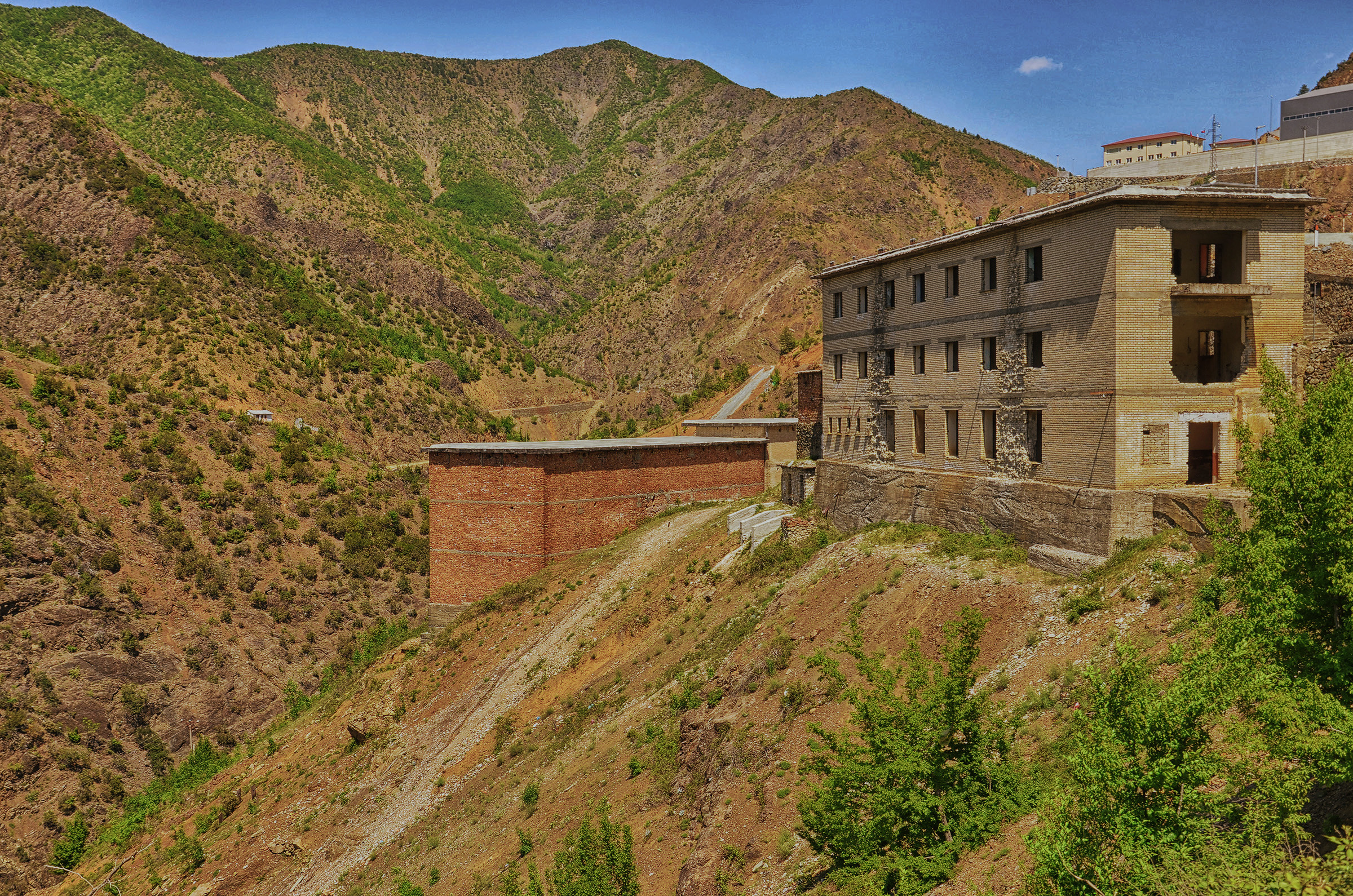
- The main buildings of the Spaç Prison in 2018
- Interactive map of Spaç Prison
- Location: Reps, Lezhë County, Albania; 41°54′4″N 20°2′51″E
- Status: Closed (Planned to be a Museum)
- Security class: Maximum
- Opened: 1968
- Closed: 1991
- Managed by: Communist Albania

The Spaç Prison (Albanian: Burgu i Spaçit) was a political prison in Communist Albania at the village of Spaç. The former prison is listed as a second-category national monument. There were plans to turn the rapidly deteriorating site into a museum, but as of February 2013, no progress had been made at the location. In 1973, a number of prisoners staged a rebellion where the non-communist flag was raised. In 1984, a similar rebellion took place at the prison of Qafë Bar.

In 2015, the prison was listed by the New York–based organisation World Monument Fund as one of the 50 most endangered monuments worldwide.

In 2019, Tirana-based organization Cultural Heritage without Border - Albania, with the help of a team of students from Worcester Polytechnic Institute created a publicly accessible digital reconstruction of the Spaç Prison.

The Prison held many political prisoners, including prominent intellectuals, and became one of the most infamous sites of repression in the country.

== History ==
Spaç Prison was established in 1968 by the Communist government of Albania as a forced labor camp at a copper and pyrite mine in a remote mountainous area of central Albania.

== Labour Camp ==
Inmates at Spaç labor camp endured harsh conditions, including forced work in the copper mine, minimal free time, and extreme isolation in one of the most remote prisons in the world. The harsh conditions and isolation made escape nearly impossible, with only barbed wire and guard posts surrounding the camp.

Prisoners at Spaç worked in rotating shifts in the mines, enduring extreme heat and freezing winters, with poor safety conditions, inadequate tools, strict daily quotas, and the constant threat of punishment for underperformance. After long shifts in the mines, prisoners returned to overcrowded, unheated cells, often so small that there was barely space to lie down or move.

Among its prisoners was the artist Maks Velo, who described Spaç as “the most terrible camp in Europe and the world during this period.”

Prison Guards at Spaç enforced strict discipline through brutal punishments, including beatings and torture of those expressing political dissent or failing to meet work quotas. Female prisoners were also subjected to abuse, including beatings, sexual assault, and forced abortions. In May 1973, prisoners staged a brief rebellion, raising an Albanian flag without the communist star, but it was suppressed within two days and the alleged leaders were executed. The prisoners’ revolt, became one of the first moments of resistance to the oppression of the regime. Nevertheless, Spaç continued to operate as a labor camp until the fall of the communist party from power in the early 1990s.

== See also ==
- Forced labour camps in Communist Albania
- Prison of Burrel
