= Kurt Agë Kadiu =

Albanian politician

Kurt Agë Kadiu (Lis, Vilayet of Scutari, Ottoman Empire 1868 - Mat, Albania 1923) was a 19th-century Albanian politician. He was one of the delegates of the Albanian Declaration of Independence.
