= Bashkim Shehu =

Albanian writer (born 1955)

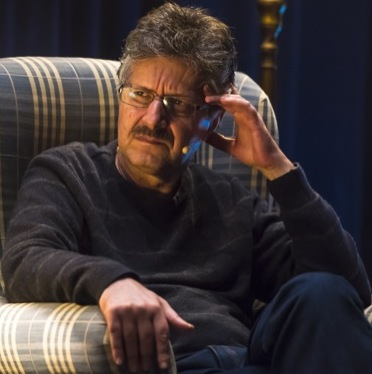
- Bashkim Shehu, 2016
- Born: 22 June 1955 (age 71); Tirana, Albania
- Education: University of Tirana; University of Budapest
- Occupations: Screenwriter (1979–1981; 1991–1992); Writer and translator (1995–present)
- Years active: 1977–1981; 1991–1992; 1995–present
- Spouse: Edlira Hoxholli
- Parents: Mehmet Shehu (father); Fiqrete Shehu (mother)

Bashkim Shehu (born 22 June 1955, Tirana) is an Albanian writer who lives in Barcelona, Spain.

== Biography ==
From 1975 to 1980, he studied Liberal Arts at the University of Tirana. Until 1981, he worked as a screenwriter at Kinostudio Shqipëria e Re. At that time his father, Mehmet Shehu, was Albania's Prime Minister and a leading candidate to replace Enver Hoxha. This connection allowed him access to literary works that were banned by the Communist regime. His exposure to those works prompted his decision to become a writer. His first work appeared in 1977 and, until 1981, he worked as a screenwriter at Kinostudio Shqipëria e Re.

That year, Hoxha accused his father of being a foreign agent. The elder Shehu was found dead in December and Bashkim was sentenced to ten years in prison for distributing subversive propaganda. In 1989, his sentence was reduced to eight years, but he was still kept under house arrest after his release from Spaç Prison. His freedom was restored when the Communist government fell in 1991. He returned to his position at the Kinostudio (now "Albfilm") and remained there until 1993, when he went to Hungary to study sociology at the University of Budapest.

Upon returning to Tirana, he became a monitor for the International Helsinki Federation for Human Rights. In 1997, during the Albanian unrest, he went into self-exile and settled in Barcelona, where he still resides. After ten years of being an advisor to the Centre de Cultura Contemporània de Barcelona, he became a freelance writer. He and his companion, Edlira Hoxholli, also translate English, Spanish and French works into Albanian.

== Works ==
- Rrugëtimi i mbramë i Ago Ymerit (The Last Journey of Ago Ymeri), novel, Buzuku, Tirana, 1995 ISBN 86-7785-025-2
- Rrethi (The Circle), novel, Pristina, 2000, Tirana, 2002
- Orfeu në Zululandën e Re (Orpheus in New Zululand), novel, Tirana, 2003
- Udhëkryqi dhe humnerat (The Crossroad and the Abysses ), novel, Tirana, 2003
- Gjarpri dhe heronj të tjerë (The Serpent and Other Heroes), novel, Tirana, 2004
- Angelus Novus (Angelus Novus), novel, Tirana, Toena, 2005 ISBN 978-99943-1-036-4
- Hija e gurit (The Stone's Shadow), stories, Tirana, Toena, 2006 ISBN 99943-1-068-2
- Mozart, me vonesë (Mozart with a delay), novel, Tirana, Toena, 2009 ISBN 978-99943-1-506-2
- Loja, shembja e qiellit (The Game, the Fall of the Sky), novel, Tirana, Toena, 2013 ISBN 978-99943-1-881-0
- Fjalor udhëzues për misterin e dosjeve (Guiding Dictionary on the Mystery of the Dossiers), novel, Tirana, Toena, 2015 ISBN 978-99943-1-950-3

=== English translations ===
- The Last Journey of Ago Ymeri (2007) ISBN 978-0810121119

== See also ==
- Socialist People's Republic of Albania
- Mehmet Shehu
- Enver Hoxha
