= Dom Simon Jubani =

Albanian political prisoner

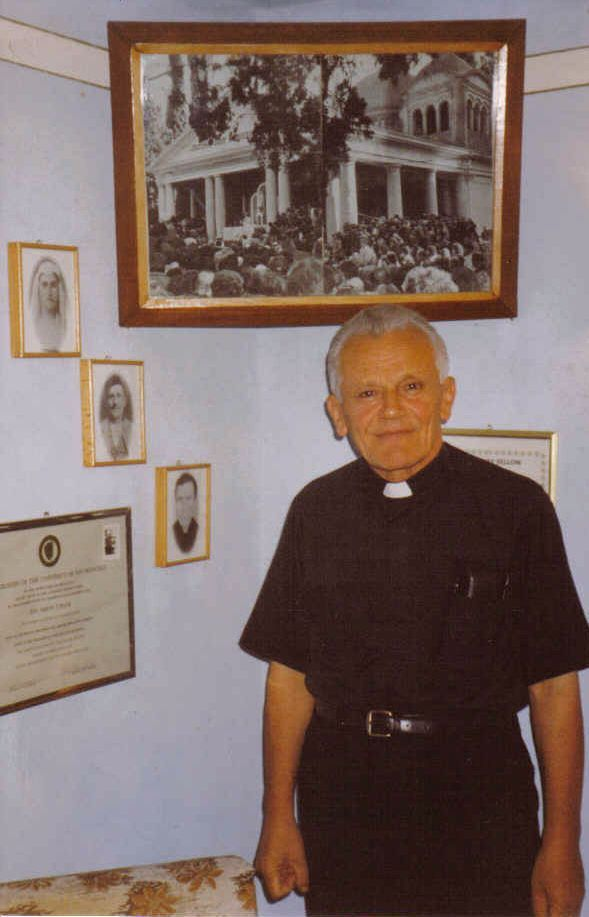
Dom Simon Jubani

Dom Simon Jubani (8 March 1927 – 12 July 2011) was a Catholic priest and Albanian political prisoner confined in Burrel Prison for 26 years during the regime of Enver Hoxha.

== Early career and imprisonment ==
Jubani, brother of Dom Lazer who was poisoned in 1982, was born in Shkodër, a city in Northwestern Albania with a large Catholic population, to a devoted Catholic family. He entered seminary in 1943. He was ordained in 1958 and then arrested in 1963 while serving at the Abbey of Mirëdita, in a nearby province, for practicing the Catholic religion. In Burrel Prison he was kept in a 12 by 24 foot cell with 30 other prisoners and beaten brutally when he refused to work in the mines. Practicing religion in Albania became illegal in 1967 and many religious leaders were tortured, killed, or imprisoned for practicing their faith publicly. Dom Simon wrote a memoir of his time in prison, titled Burgjet e mia.

== After release ==
Jubani was released on 13 April 1989, along with other imprisoned Catholic priests. On 4 November 1990, Jubani celebrated the first public mass since the fall of Hoxha's regime, defying the law; 300 people attended. He was awarded an honorary doctorate by the University of San Francisco in 1991, honored as a "Protagonist of a new era in Albania".

Jubani died of a cerebral hemorrhage on 12 July 2011 at the Regional Hospital in Shkodër.

== Publications ==
- Burgjet e mia, 2001
- Du fond de l'enfer, j'ai vu Jésus en croix, Éditions Docteur angélique, 2021 ISBN 978-2-918303-37-4
- From the Depths of Hell I Saw Jesus on the Cross: A Priest in the Prisons of Communist Albania, Arouca Press, 2021 ISBN 978-1-989905-76-0
- Dal profondo dell’inferno ho visto Gesù crocifisso, Edizioni Cantagalli, 2024 ISBN 9791259623942
- Aus der Tiefe der Hölle habe ich Jesus am Kreuz gesehen - Ein Priester in den kommunistischen Gefängnissen Albaniens, Medien-GmbH Heiligenkreuz, 2023 ISBN 978-3903602410
- З глибин пекла я бачив Ісуса на Хресті, Дом Сімон Ювані, 2022 ISBN 978-966-658-483-3
