= Vibius Sequester =

4th or 5th century Roman writer

Vibius Sequester (active in the 4th or 5th century AD) is the Latin author of lists of geographical names.

== Work ==
De fluminibus, fontibus, lacubus, nemoribus, gentibus, quorum apud poëtas mentio fit is made up of seven alphabetical lists of geographical names mentioned by poets, especially Virgil, Ovid and Lucan.

Several of the names do not appear in our copies of the poets; unless this is the result of carelessness or ignorance by the compiler, he must have had access to sources no longer extant.

The lists are:

1. Flumina (rivers/waterways)
2. Fontes (springs)
3. Lacus (lakes)
4. Nemora (forests)
5. Paludes (marshes)
6. Montes (mountains)
7. Gentes (peoples)

The work was highly regarded by scholars of the Italian Renaissance, and almost 50 manuscript copies survive. All of these, however, can be traced back to a single Carolingian manuscript written in the second half of the 9th century, Vat. Lat. 4929.

The work is best known for preserving a dactylic pentameter line quoted from Cornelius Gallus, uno tellures dividit amne duas ("[the Scythian Hypanis] with its one stream divides two lands"), which was the only known fragment of Gallus's poetry before the discovery in 1978 of several additional lines by him on an Egyptian papyrus. Sequester's interest in the geographic categorizations of older authors, which often lack coherent criteria, represents the reexamination of naturalistic and geographic knowledge during late antiquity.

== Editions ==
- Older editions include those published in Toulouse (1615); Rotterdam (1711); Paris (1843), and, by Conrad Bursian, Zürich (1867). The text is also in Alexander Riese's Geographi Latini minores (1878). See also Teuffel, History of Roman Literature (Eng. trans., 1900), 445, 1.
- Newer editions include the Teubner edited by R. Gelsomino (1967) and the edition of P.G. Parroni (Milan, 1965).
- Online: de Maussac, Philippe Jacques, ed. (1615). Liber de fluminibus, fontibus, lacubus, nemoribus, gentibus, quorum apud poetas mentio fit. Toulouse.
- Online: p. 145-159 of Alexander Riese, ed. (1878), Geographi Latini Minores, Heilbronn, available at Google Books or the Internet Archive.
