= Shkopet Hydroelectric Power Station =

Hydroelectric power station in Albania

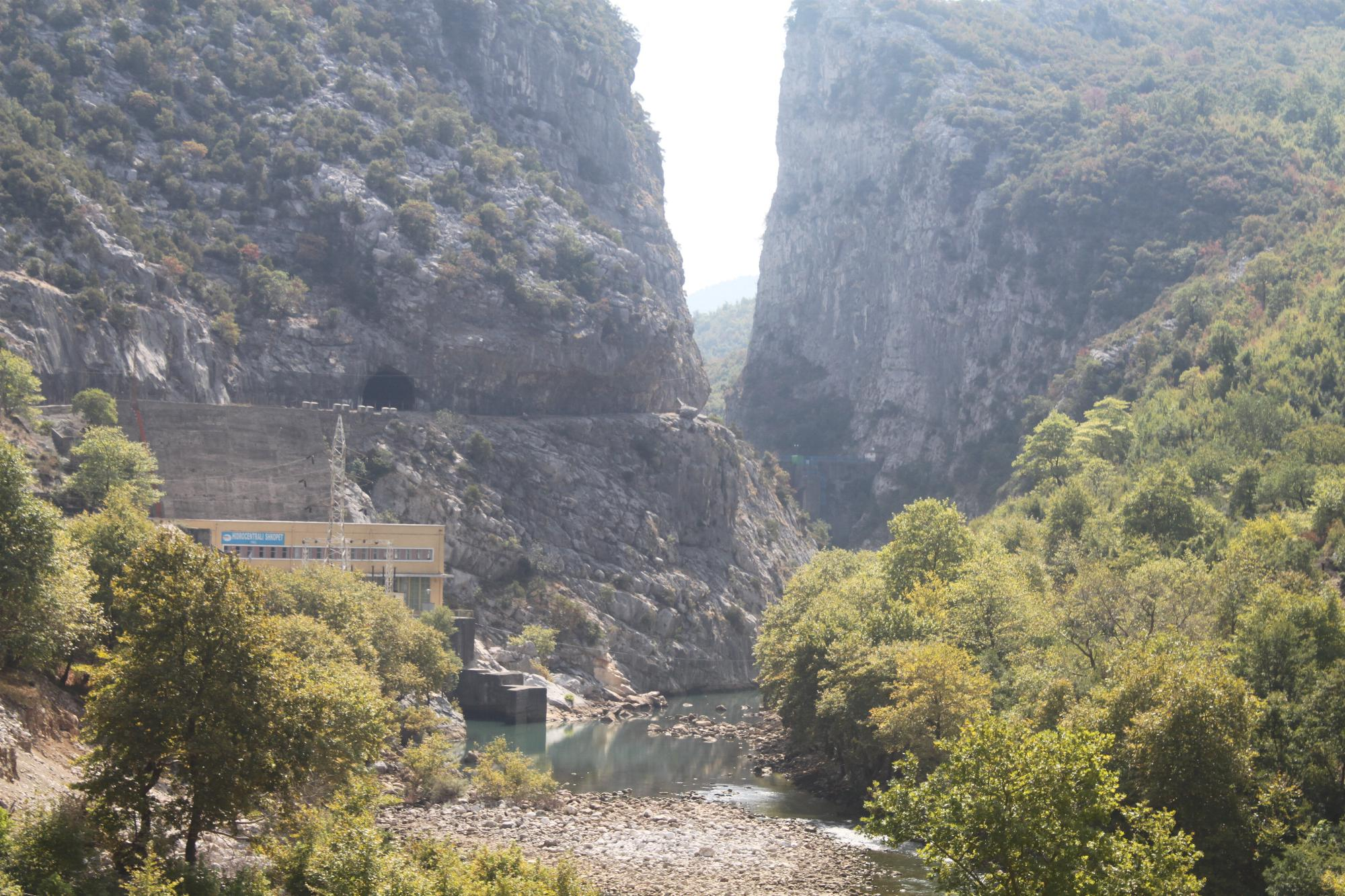

- Location within Albania
- Official name: Hidrocentrali i Shkopetit
- Country: Albania
- Coordinates: 41.691279°N 19.830469°E
- Purpose: Power
- Status: Operational
- Construction began: 1959
- Opening date: 1963

The Shkopet Hydroelectric Power Station is a hydroelectric Power Station located near the village Shkopet, Albania. It has a 24 MW power installation and an annual production of 94 GWH. Its reservoir is fed and drained by the river Mat.

== See also ==
- List of power stations in Albania
