= Fatos Lubonja =

Albanian writer and dissident

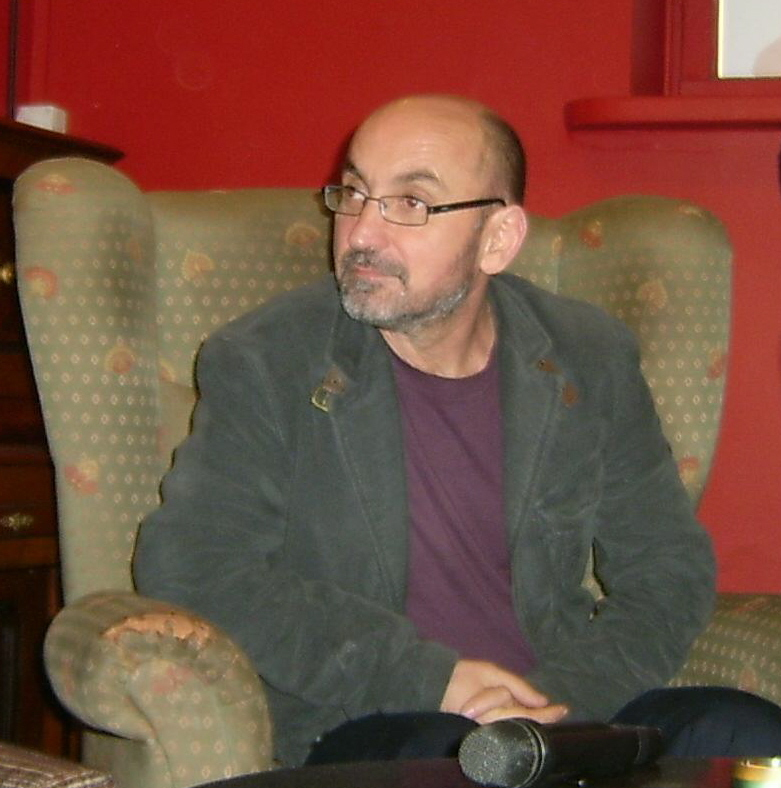
Fatos Lubonja in Warsaw in 2006

Fatos Lubonja (born 1951) is an Albanian writer and dissident.

== Life ==
Lubonja was born in 1951. He attended the University of Tirana for his education. Lubonja was in jail from 1972 to 1991 as a political prisoner.

He is an outspoken critic of Albanian socio-political factors, i.e. right-wing leader Sali Berisha, Socialist Party leader Edi Rama, former KLA leader Ramush Haradinaj, the Red and Black Alliance, and Ismail Kadare. Lubonja works for Përpjekja (Endeavour), which was founded by him in 1994. In 1997, he received the prize "Archivio Disarmo - Golden Doves for Peace" from IRIAD.

Lubonja received the SEEMO Award for Mutual Cooperation in South East Europe in 2004. He wrote about communism with The Last Massacre. His book "False Apocalypse" was translated into English and published in London by Istros Books in 2014.
