= Ulëz =

City in Albania

- Settlement
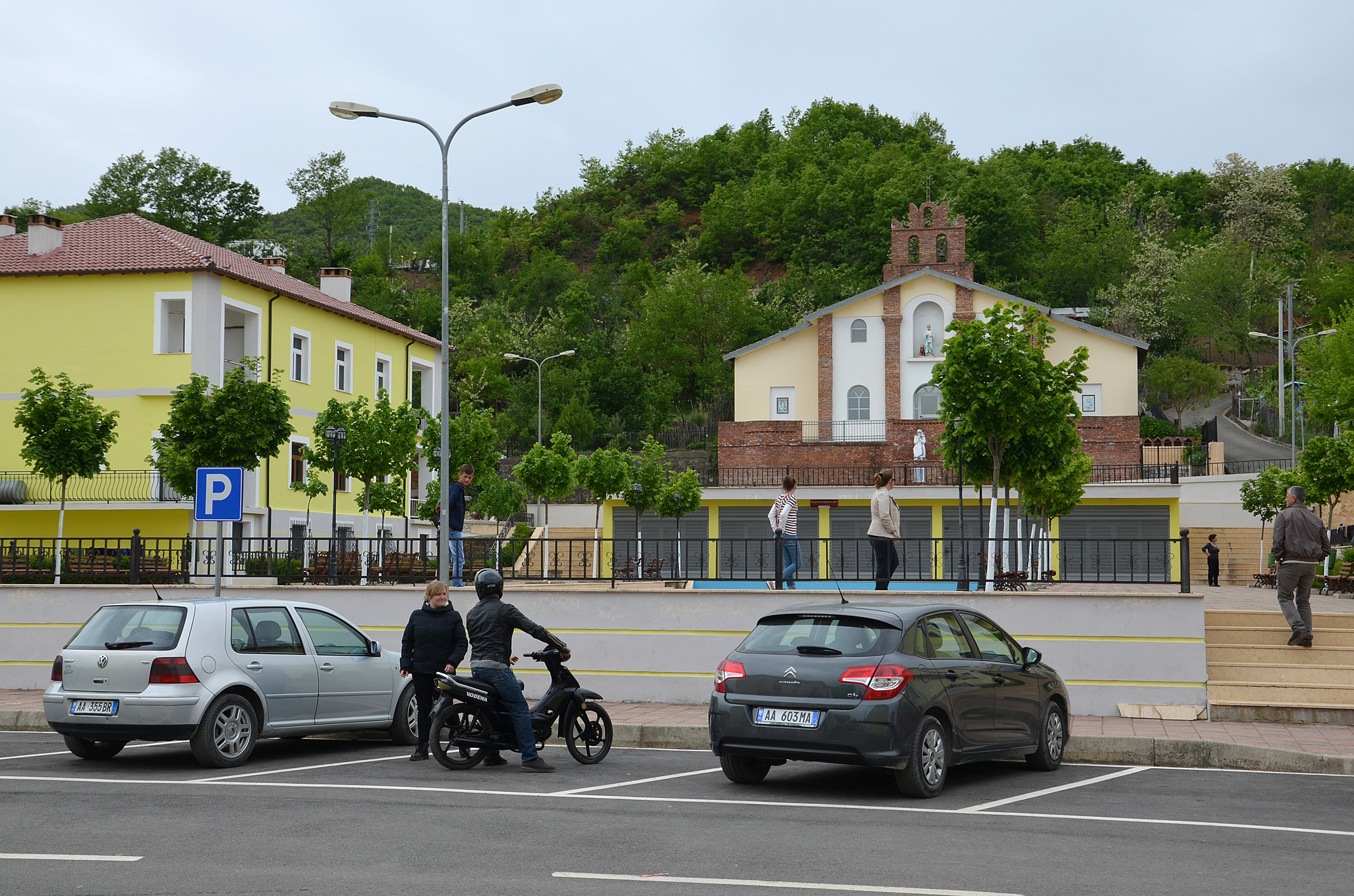
- View of Ulëz

- Location within Albania
- Coordinates: 41°41′0″N 19°53′40″E
- Country: Albania
- County: Dibër
- Municipality: Mat

Population (2011)
  - Administrative unit: 1,229
- Time zone: UTC+1 (CET)
  - Summer (DST): UTC+2 (CEST)
- Postal Code: 8003

Ulëz is a city and administrative unit in the municipality of Mat, Albania. It has a population of 1,229 as of the 2011 Albanian census. Ulëz is home to the Ulëz Hydroelectric Power Station and designated as part of the Ulza Regional Nature Park. It is the Least-Populated City or settlement of Albania.
