= Lists of royal residences =

The following lists of royal residences is sorted by country:

- List of Albanian royal residences
- List of British royal residences
- List of Danish royal residences
- List of French royal residences
- List of Hawaiian royal residences
- List of Moroccan royal residences
- List of Serbian royal residences
- List of Spanish royal residences
- List of Swedish royal residences
- List of Thai royal residences

== See also ==
- List of royal palaces
- List of official residences
