= Royal Villa of Durrës =

Coordinates: 41.3147°N 19.4387°E

- Vila mbretërore e Durrësit
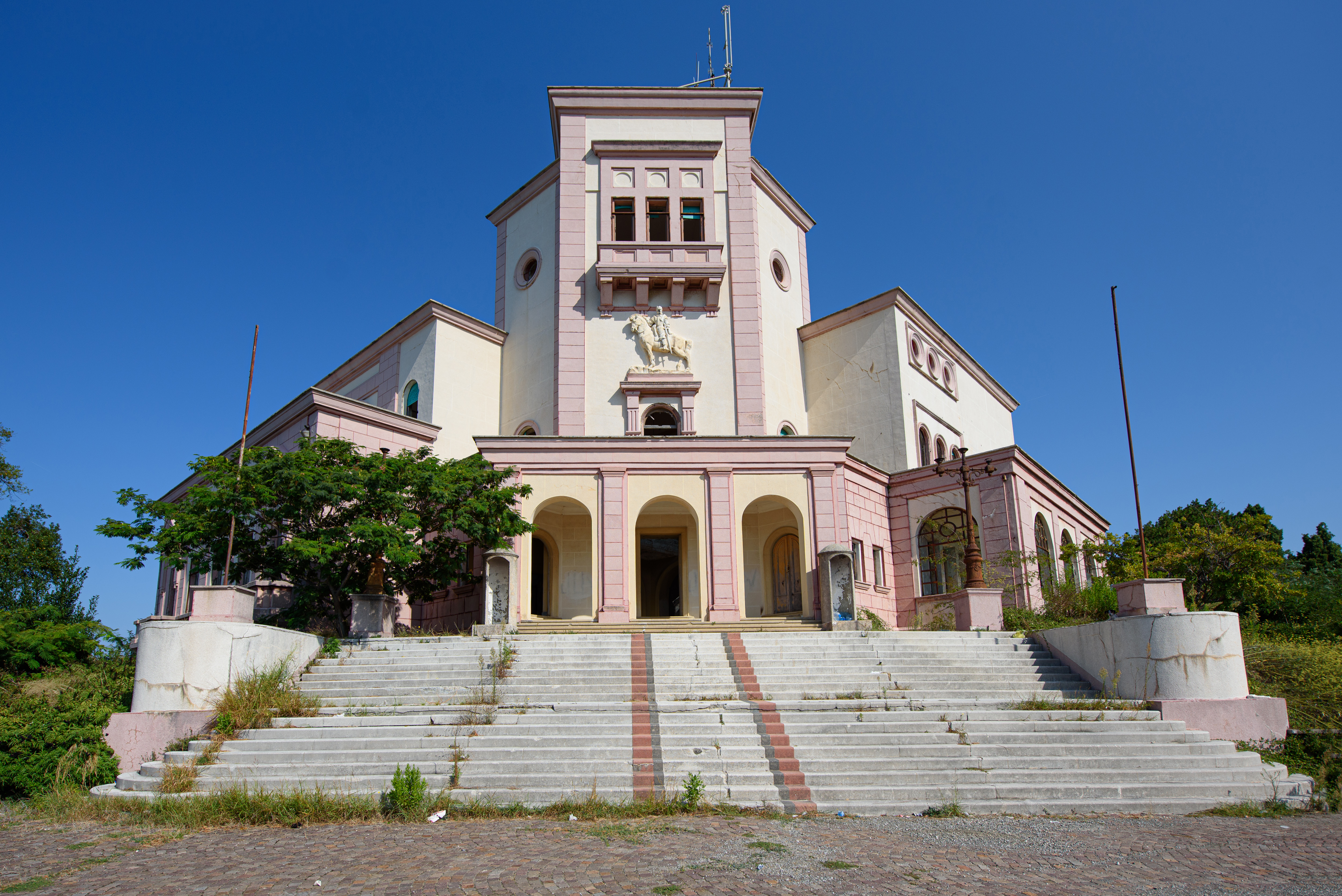
- The main entrance of the villa.
- Interactive map of the Royal Villa of Durrës area
- Alternative names: Vila e Zogut

General information
- Type: Villa
- Architectural style: Rationalism; Monumental Rationalism
- Location: Durrës, Albania, Kodër Vilë, Durrës
- Construction started: 16 June 1927
- Completed: 1937
- Cost: 50.218,760 Franga
- Client: King Zog I of the Albanians; Queen Geraldine of the Albanians
- Owner: House of Zogu

The Royal Villa of Durrës (Albanian: Vila mbretërore e Durrësit or Albanian: Vila mbretnore Durrës or Albanian: Vila e Zogut) is a former royal summer residence overlooking the Bay of Durrës, Albania. Commissioned by King Zog I, it was completed in 1937 as the most prestigious architectural project of the short-lived Albanian monarchy.

The villa occupies a commanding position on Kodër Vilë, a hill rising nearly 98 metres above sea level, offering panoramic views of the Adriatic coast. Designed in the idiom of Italian Rationalism, its pyramidal massing and monumental terraces were combined with neoclassical interiors of imported marble, gilt and symbolic ornament. During its history the building served as Zog’s summer retreat, as the residence of Italian and German occupation authorities, and later as a state guesthouse under communism. Looted in 1997, the villa was later returned to the Albanian royal family but has remained largely closed since the 2000s, though in 2025 a private initiative announced its full restoration to its original 1939 appearance.

Despite its decline, the villa has remained one of the most recognisable symbols of Zog’s monarchy and is often cited as an emblem of Albania’s royal heritage. Its elevated site, Rationalist monumentality, and double-headed eagle motifs made it a landmark of sovereign identity in the 1930s. Today it endures in public memory as a reminder of the royal era and of Albania’s only native king.

== History ==
=== Origins and early projects (1925–1930s) ===
The idea of a representative residence at Durrës emerged in the mid-1920s, shortly after Ahmet Zogu assumed the presidency of the Albanian Republic. Its financing drew on a major 1925 Italian state loan for Albanian public works, which also funded roads and infrastructure. The hill site at Durrës was selected for its strategic and symbolic prominence above the harbour, historically linked to the Illyrian, Roman and Venetian heritage of the city.

Several successive architects were involved:

- The Italian monumental designer Armando Brasini drew up an early scheme in the Novecento style, emphasising axial approaches and classical massing.
- Albanian engineer Kristo Sotiri, an architect who had graduated from the University of Padova and the University of Venice, Italy, and who also had 11 years of experience as an architect of the court of Queen Elisabeth of Romania. Between 1926 and 1927, he designed a villa with an octagonal belvedere tower. This first palace suffered serious damage in the 1927 earthquake.
- German architect Hans Köhler proposed a modernist solution with strict geometries and terraces, but this was not executed.
- Finally, Italian planner Florestano Di Fausto, chief architect of Italian public works in Albania, was entrusted with a definitive project. He retained aspects of Köhler’s site plan but redesigned the façades in a monumental Rationalist manner. Architectural historians also mention the involvement of Gherardo Bosio, who collaborated with Di Fausto in Albania in the 1930s.

The total cost of the villa is estimated at about 1.5 million gold francs, making it one of the most expensive state projects of the interwar monarchy.

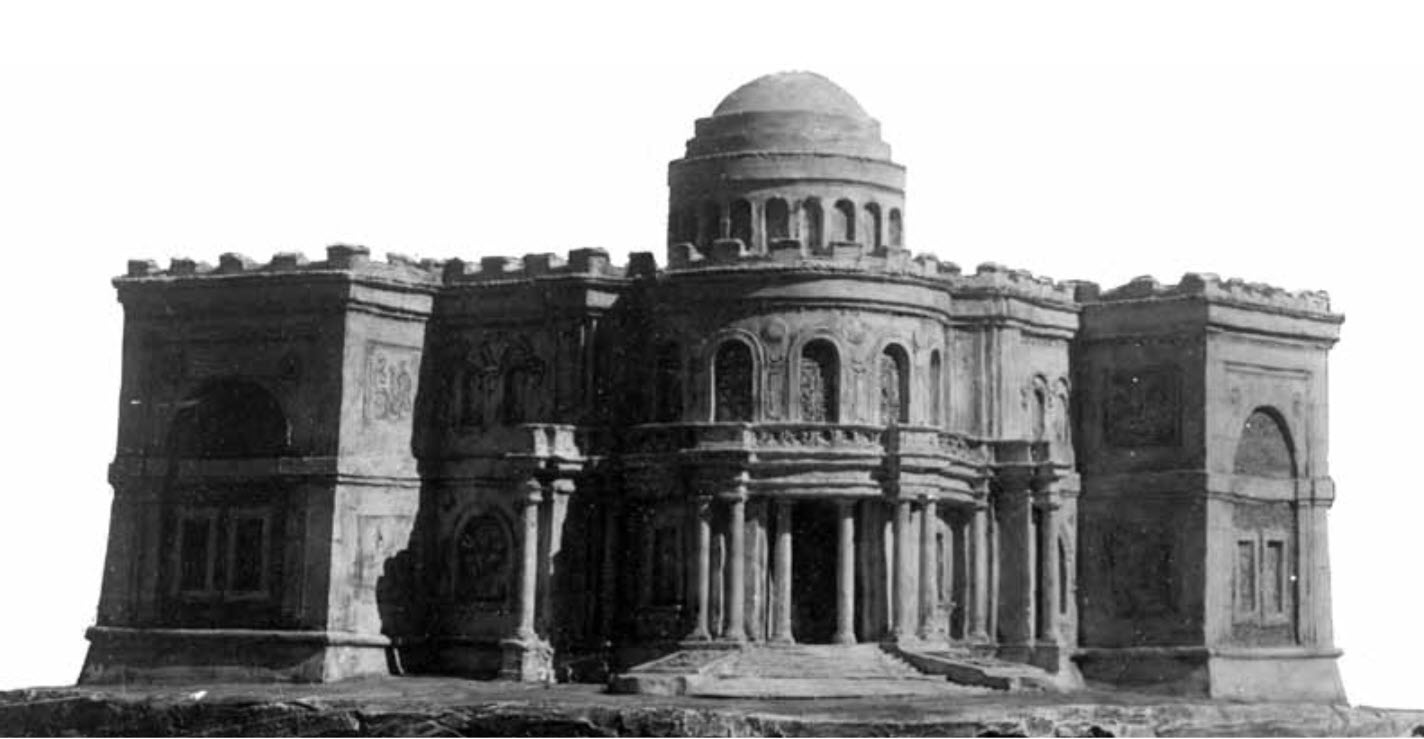
The design by Armando Brasini

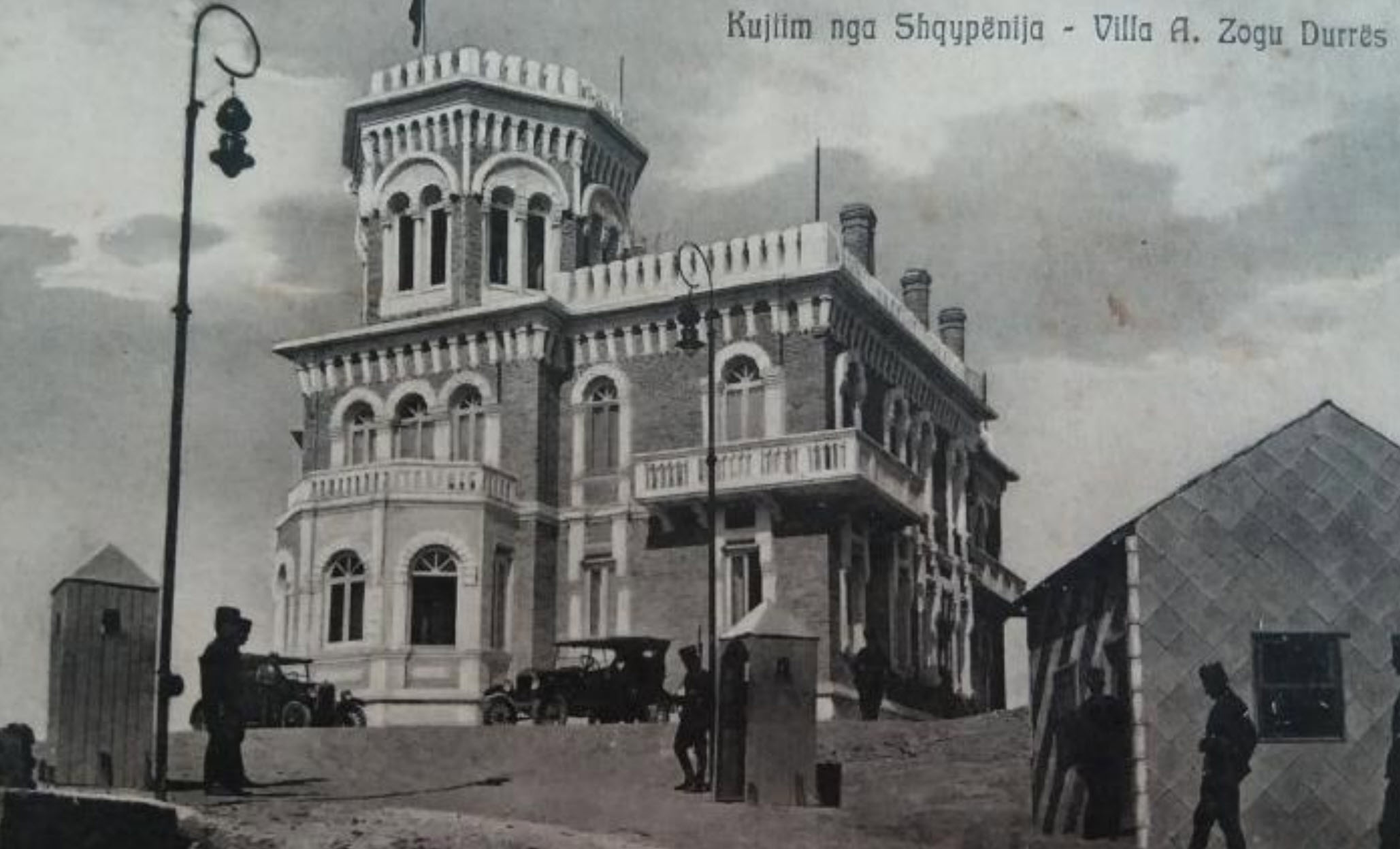
Sotiri's royal villa which was destroyed by the earthquake of 1927

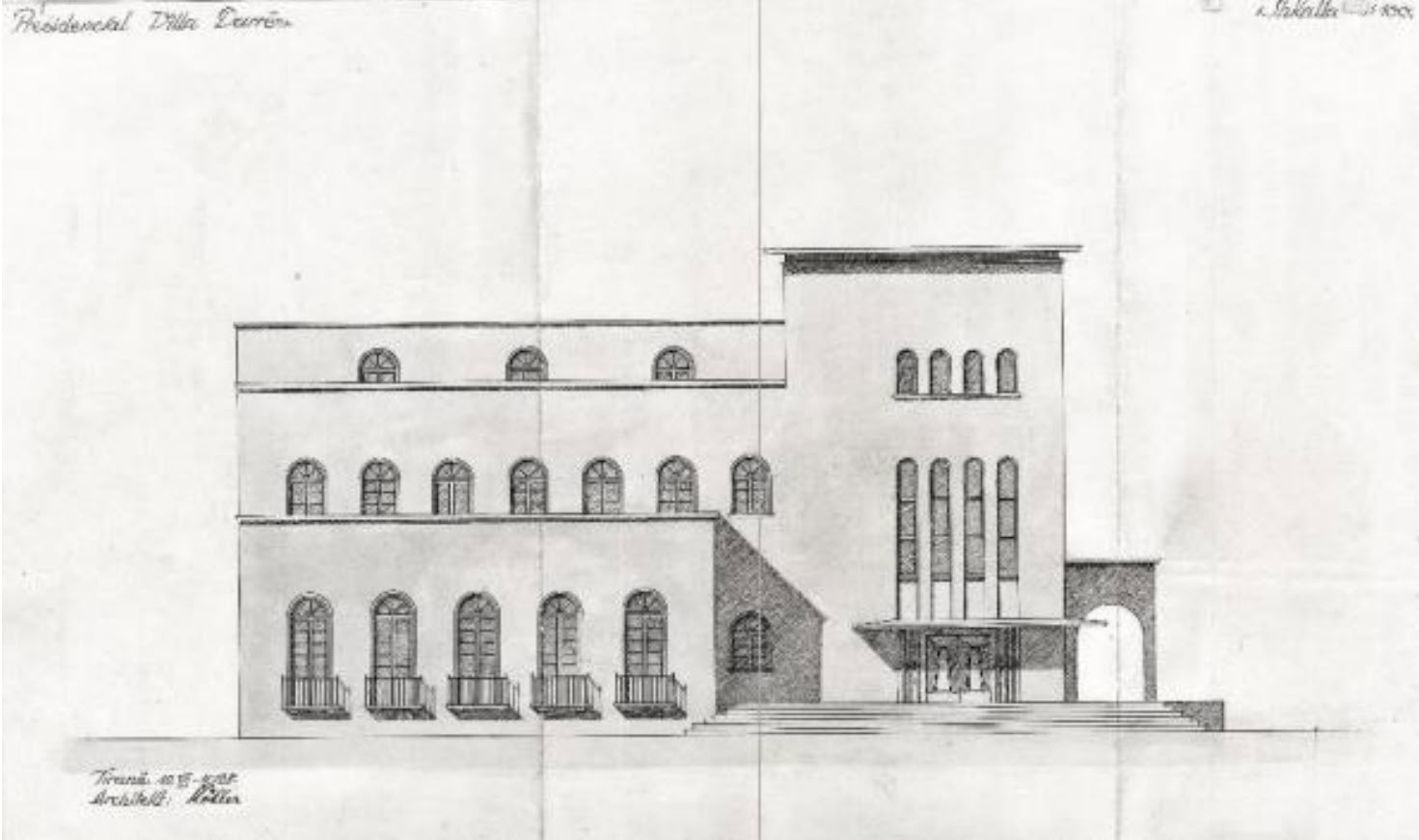
The unexecuted design by Hans Kohler (1928)

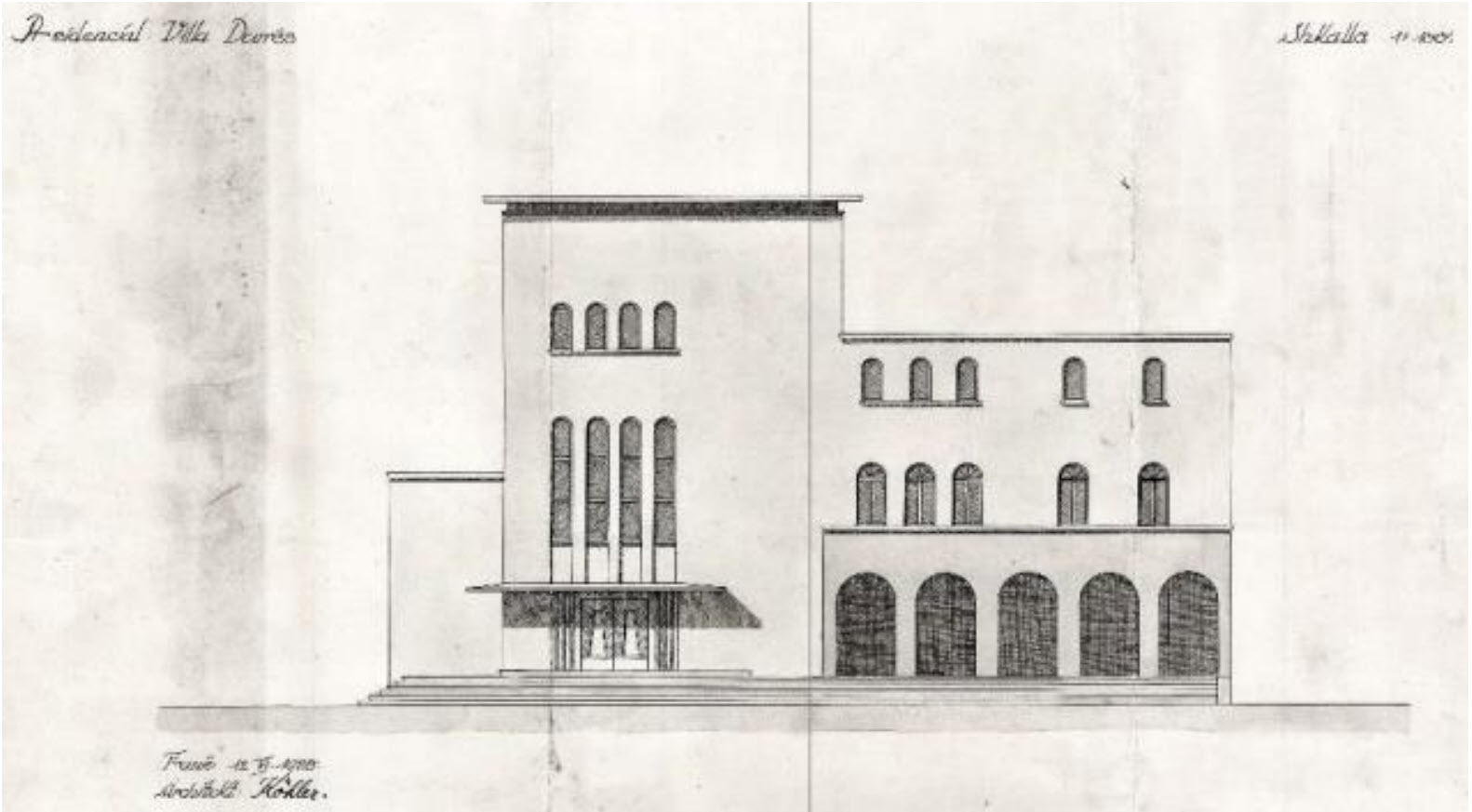
The unexecuted design by Hans Kohler (1928)

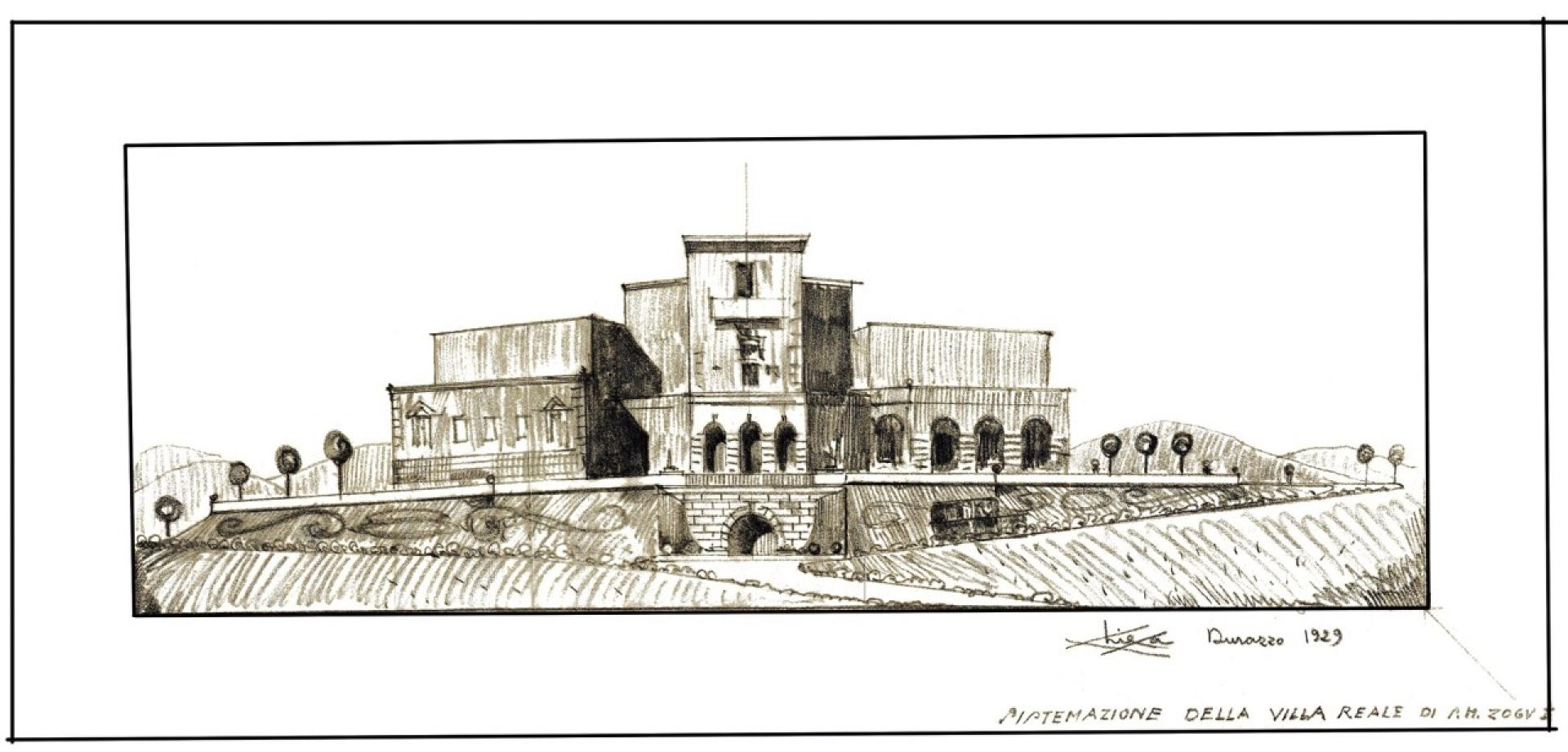
Florestano di Fausto's design for a new royal villa (1929)

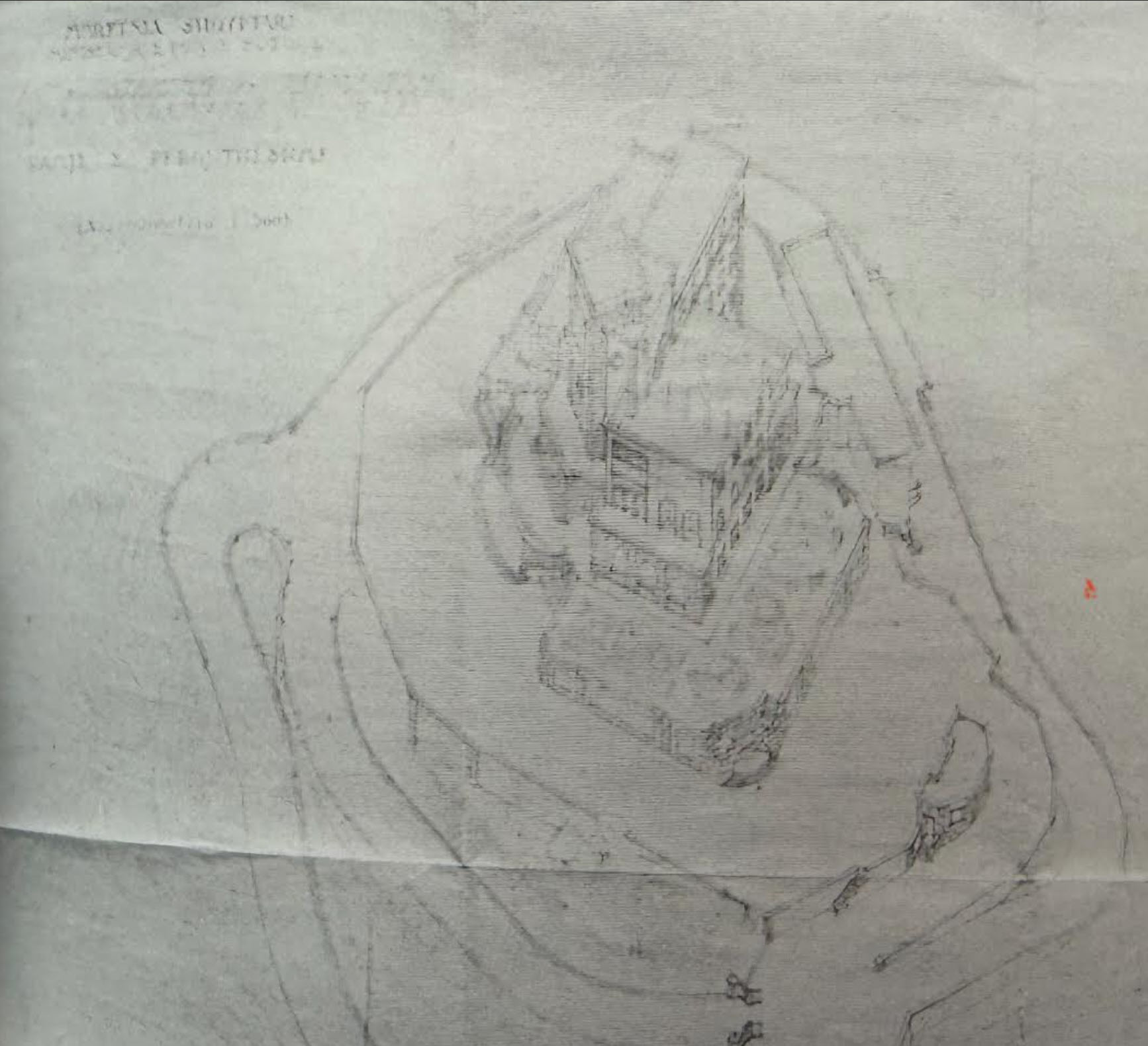
Isometric view of Florestano di Fausto's design (1929)

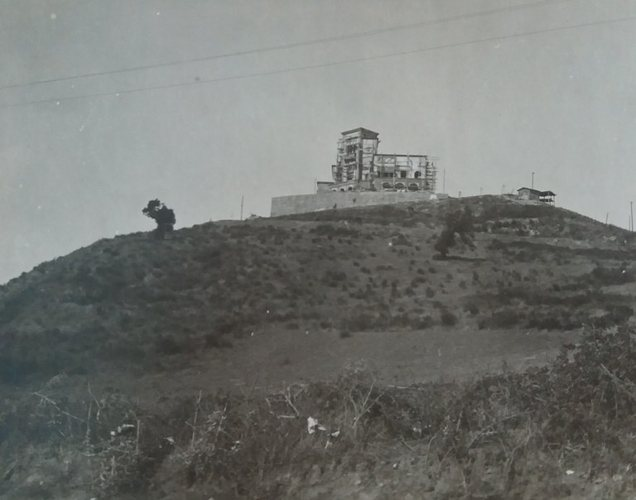
The villa during its construction

=== Royal residence (1937–1939) ===
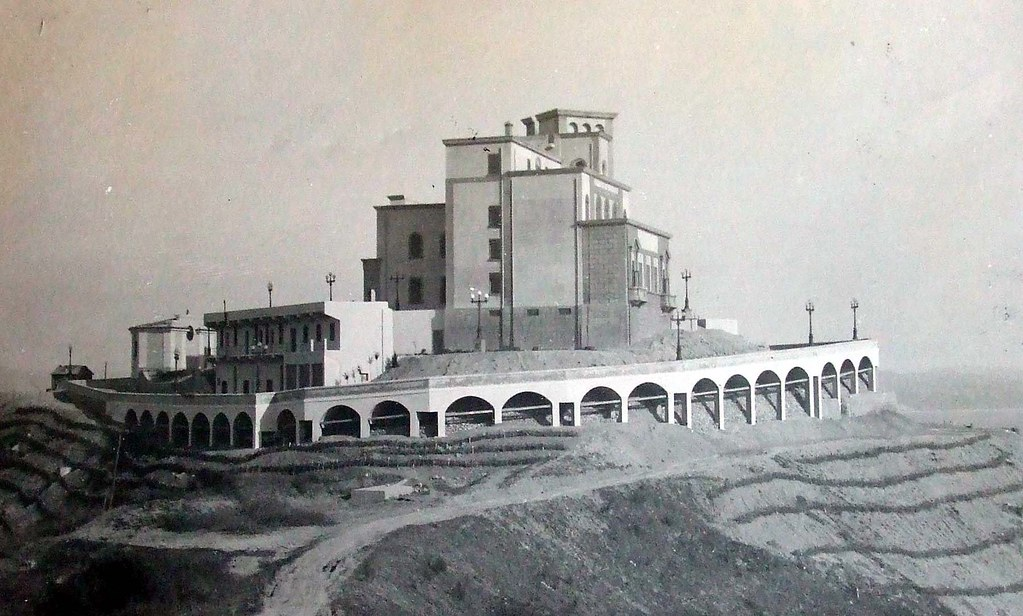
The Royal Villa (1938)

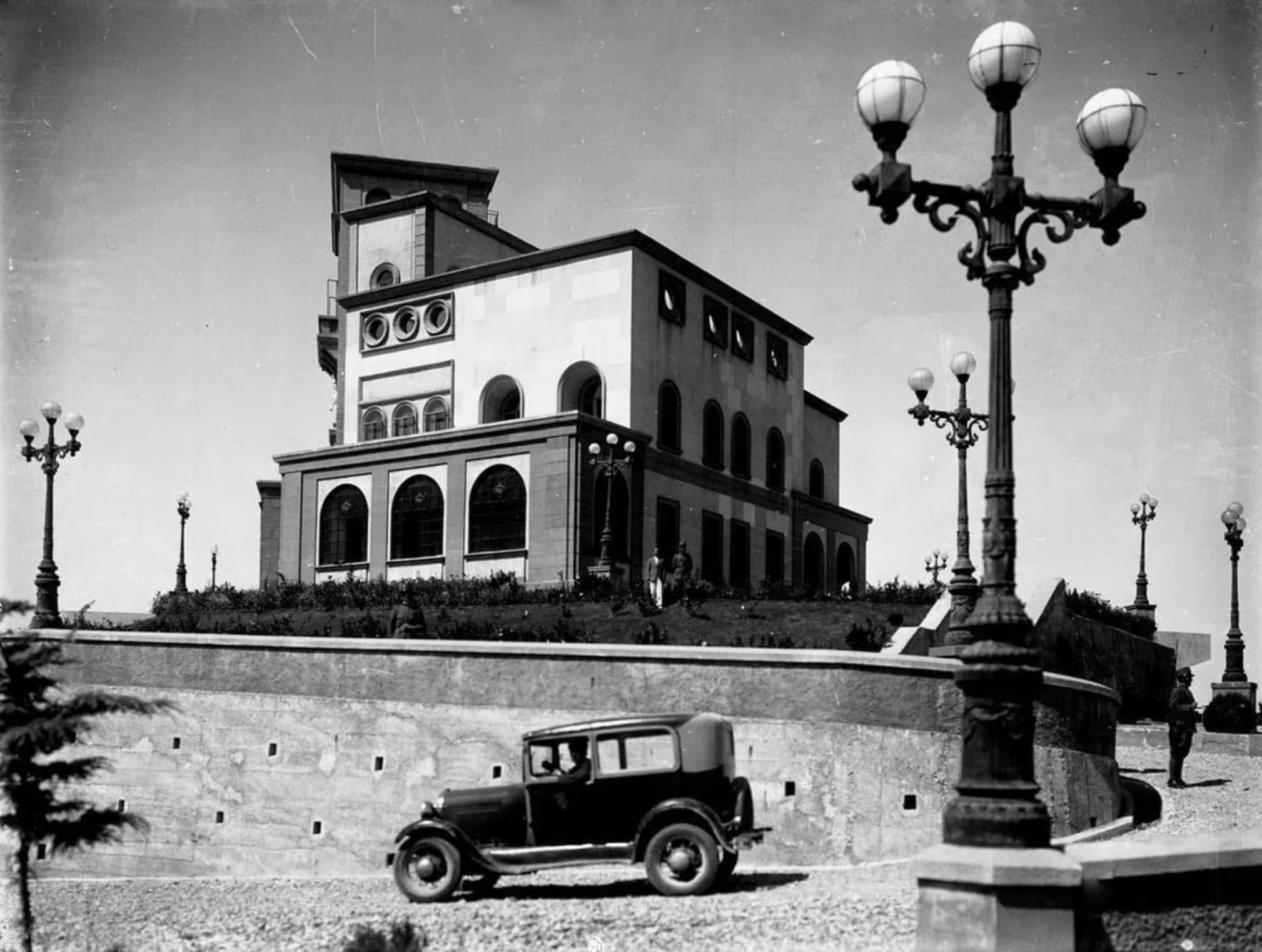
The Royal Villa (1930s)

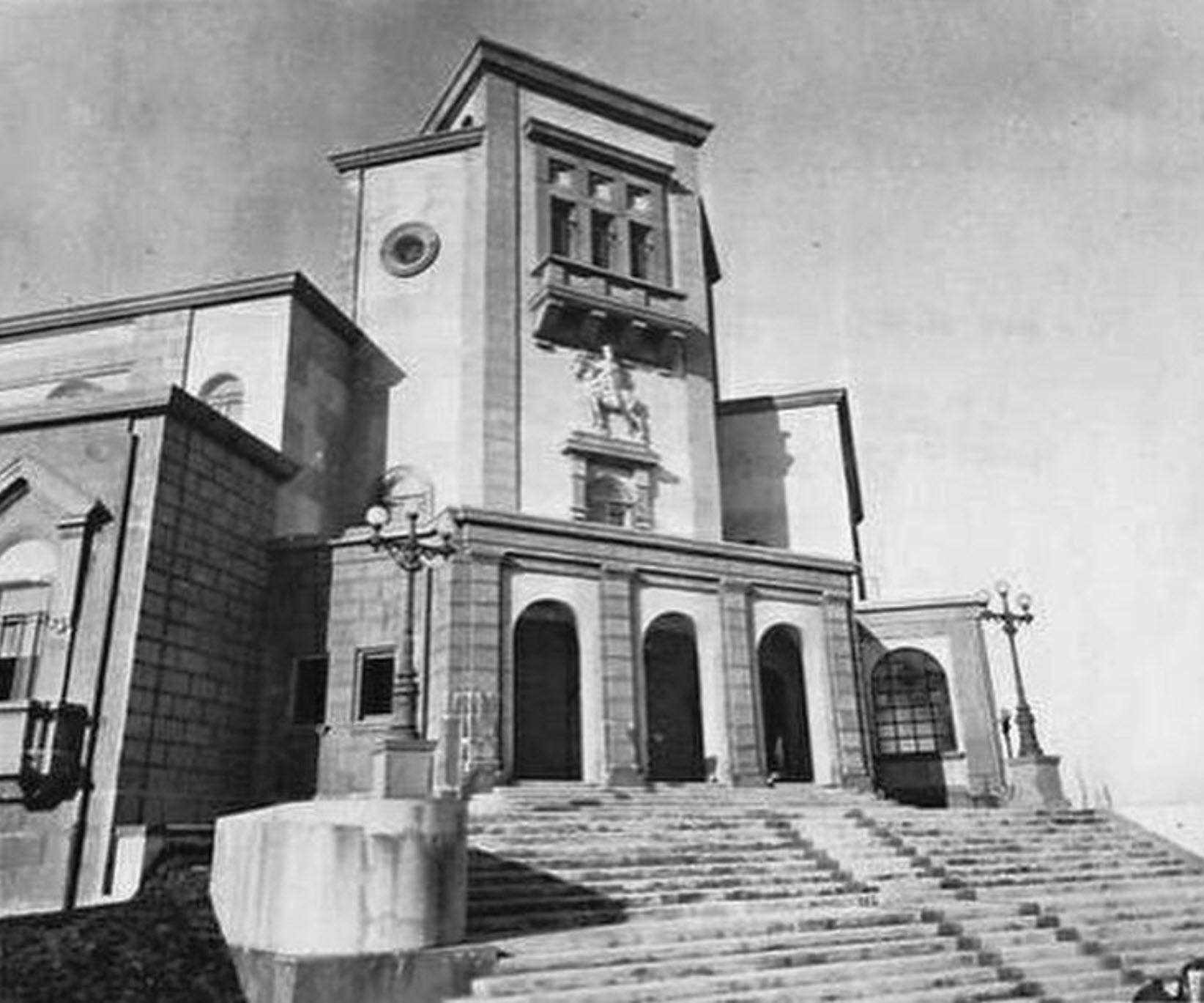
The entrance to the Royal Villa (1930s)

Construction was completed in 1937, only months before King Zog’s dynastic marriage to Hungarian noblewoman Geraldine in April 1938. The villa served as their summer retreat and as a prestigious venue for royal receptions. Its layout, with wide terraces, a central tower and sweeping views, was widely interpreted as an architectural embodiment of Albania’s sovereignty. Some contemporary commentators even described the ground plan as resembling a double-headed eagle, the national symbol of Albania.

The interiors featured an impressive central hall with Corinthian pilasters, gilt cornices and a marble floor inlaid with the double-headed eagle. Italian craftsmen supplied luxurious fittings, including chandeliers, carved doors and wall coverings in silk and brocade.

=== Occupation period (1939–1945) ===
Following the Italian invasion of Albania in April 1939, King Zog fled into exile. The villa was seized by the Italian authorities and became the residence of senior occupation officials. After 1943, when Italy capitulated, German officers used the building until their withdrawal in late 1944.

=== Communist guesthouse (1945–1990) ===
After the communist takeover, the villa was nationalised and redesignated as a state guesthouse. It hosted several important foreign leaders and delegations, including Soviet Premier Nikita Khrushchev in the 1950s and Cambodian head of state Norodom Sihanouk. The villa became a discreet but highly symbolic backdrop for Albania’s shifting foreign relations, although it remained closed to the general public.

=== Decline and looting (1990s–2000s) ===
With the fall of communism in 1991, the villa briefly returned to use for receptions, hosting foreign visitors including Jimmy Carter. However, during the civil unrest of 1997 the interiors were ransacked, with marble cladding, parquet floors and decorative fixtures stripped or damaged. Images from the late 1990s show bare concrete walls and collapsed plaster.

In 2006–07 the Berisha government returned the property to Crown Prince Leka I. An initial exterior clean-up was undertaken, but comprehensive restoration did not follow. Although, the prince presented a restoration plan, but without support from the authorities he was unable to materialize it. In 2015 the villa was listed for auction due to unpaid debts, but it was ultimately transferred through agreement to private hands rather than sold on the open market.

=== Recent initiatives (2020s–) ===
By the 2010s the villa had become a symbol of Albania’s neglected royal heritage, with journalists documenting its decay and repeated thefts. In June 2025, Albanian media reported that entrepreneur Kadri Morina, in agreement with the royal family, had taken over the site. Morina announced plans to engage Italian and French specialists to restore the villa to its original 1939 appearance within five years. His stated intention is to open the complex to tourism and official functions, making it accessible to Albanians and foreign visitors alike.

The project is notable in that the villa has never been declared a protected cultural monument by the Albanian Ministry of Culture, meaning that restoration proceeds without the oversight normally applied to heritage buildings.

In 2024 the villa housed a month-long art installation as part of the first Durres International Bienalle of Contemporary Art.

== Architecture ==
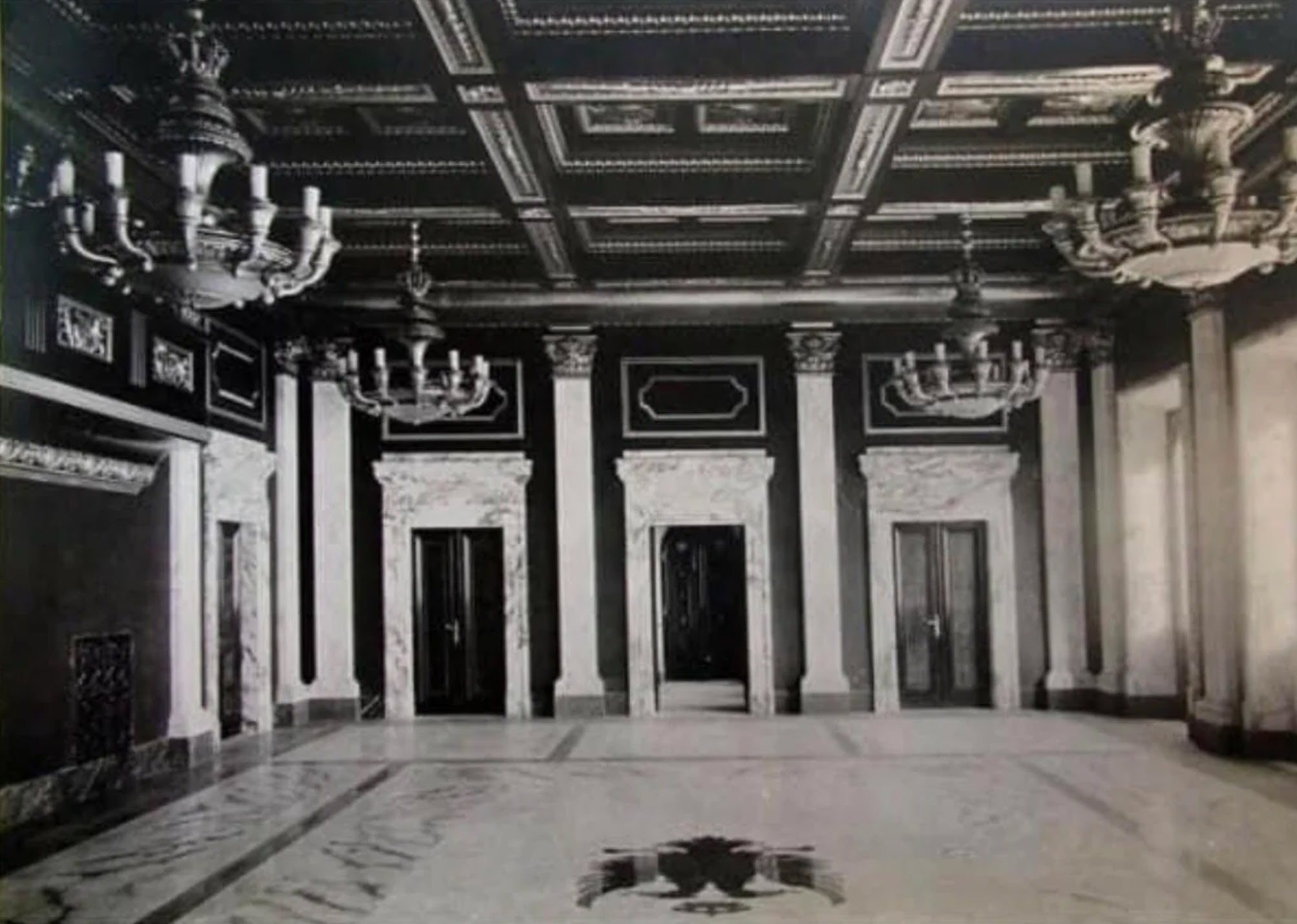
The ceremonial hall or throne room with the Albanian Eagle visible on the marble floor

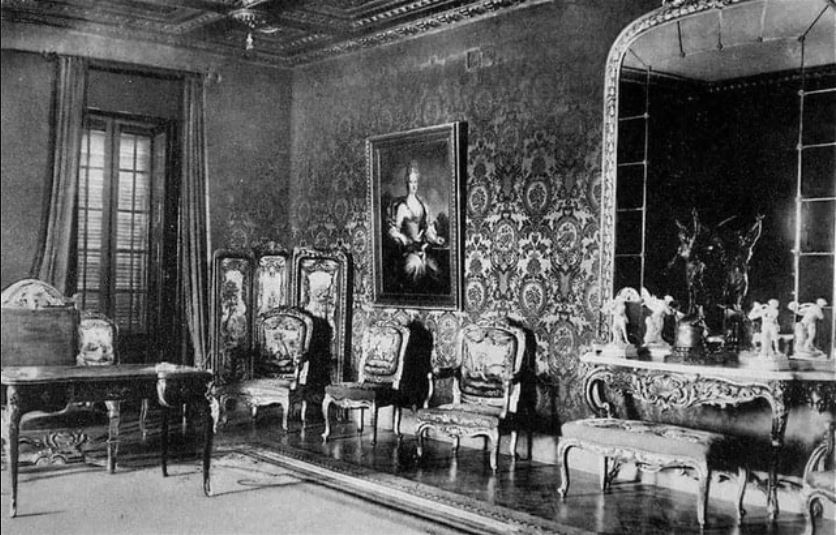
The so-called red room

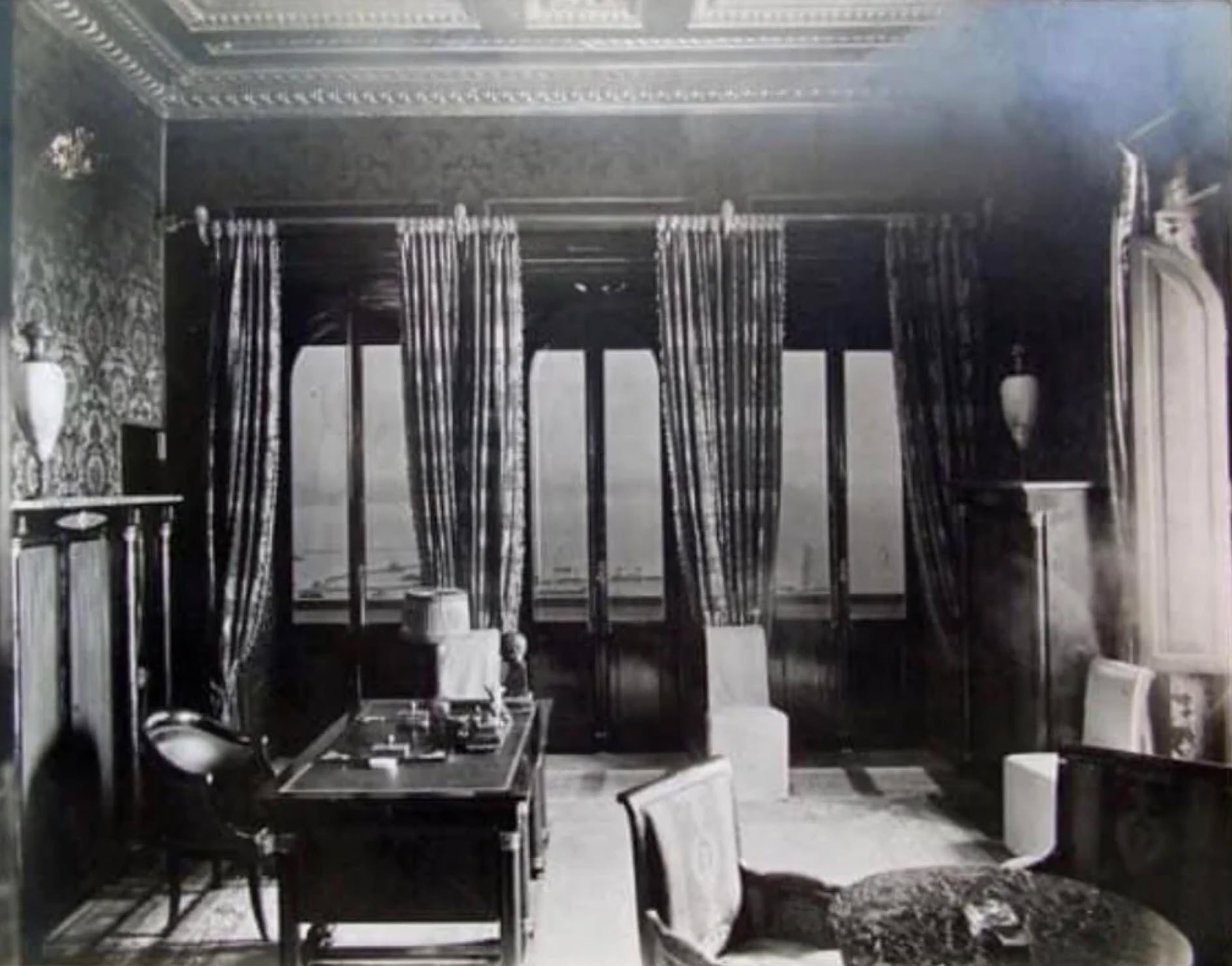
King Zog's study was located on the first floor, from he balcony he could overlook Durrës and its harbour

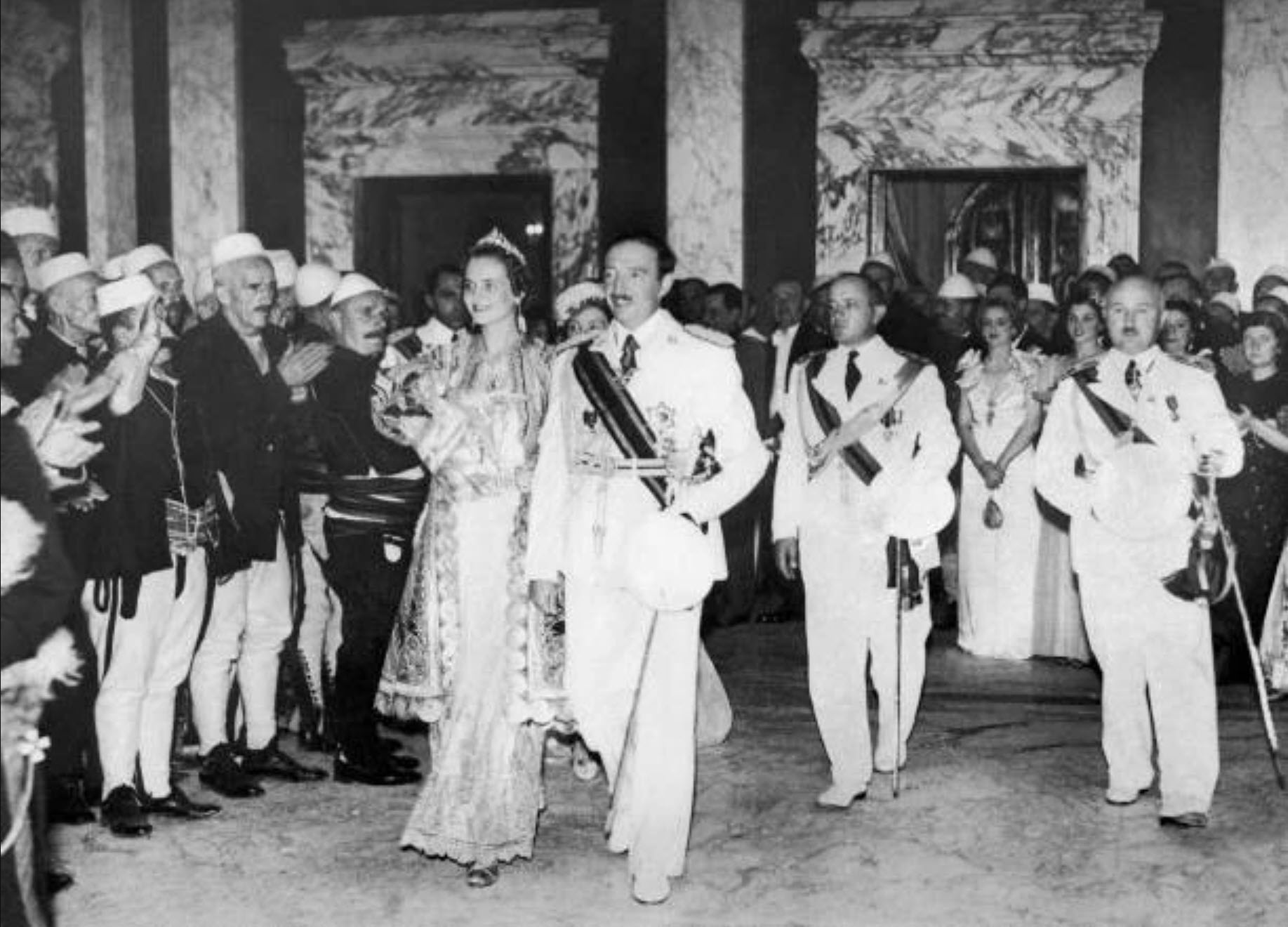
King Zog I and Queen Geraldine at Albanian Independence Day festivities in the ceremonial hall or throne room

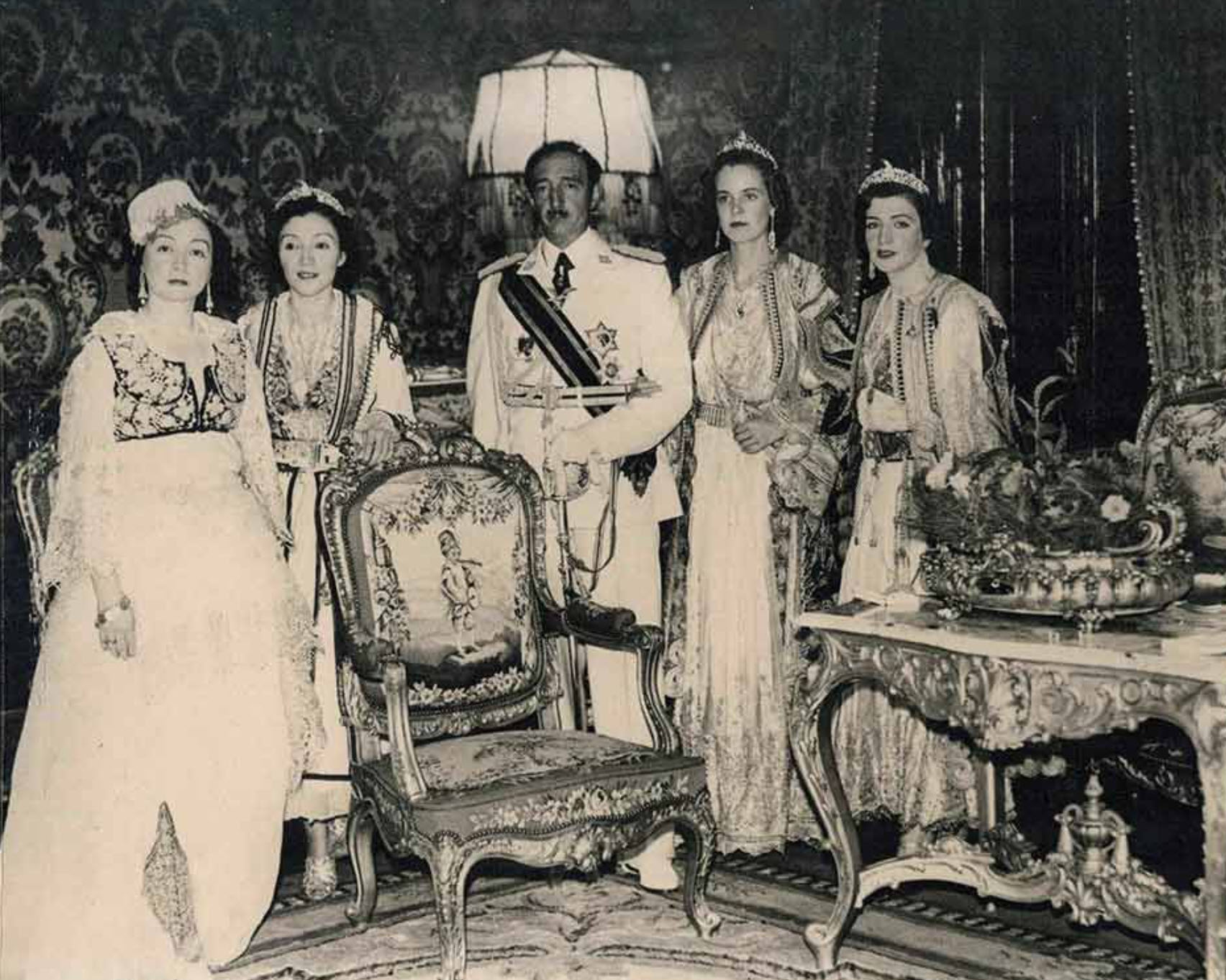
King Zog I and Queen Geraldine, and the King's sisters at Albanian Independence Day festivities in the so called “red room”

=== Exterior ===
The villa occupies a stepped platform overlooking the sea, with an axial approach from the city below. Its composition is symmetrical, dominated by a central belvedere tower and flanked by receding wings. The façades are austere, rendered in pale stone and punctuated by circular windows and arcaded loggias, typical of the Italian Rationalist idiom.

The main entrance is reached via a monumental stair rising to a porticoed terrace. The massing, rising in stages to the tower, creates a pyramidal silhouette visible from across Durrës Bay.

=== Interior ===
The ground floor of the Royal Villa of Durrës was conceived as the public heart of the residence, dominated by the monumental marble staircase and the vast ceremonial hall, or throne room, which occupied the entire left wing. This grand space, the largest in the villa, was oriented southwest to capture sunlight and views of the Adriatic. Its neoclassical decoration included Corinthian pilasters with gilt bronze capitals, marble-framed portals, coffered ceilings enriched with gilded bronze, and six chandeliers. The hall’s marble floor was inlaid with the double-headed eagle of Albania, while the royal coat of arms was displayed in relief on the main wall. A mezzanine with a grey marble balcony and gilded detailing provided another vantage point. On the opposite wing, the formal dining room was paired with vestibules for large gatherings, opening onto an arcaded winter veranda. In the north wing, the so-called “red room” offered an intimate setting for official audiences and distinguished visitors.

The first floor was reserved for the royal family and close guests. At its centre was the gallery of the grand staircase, flanked by private apartments: on the left, the king’s and queen’s suites with bedrooms, a lounge, closets, and a shared bathroom; on the right, additional bedrooms for relatives and guests. The second floor was more modest, designed for service rooms and crowned by a vast veranda with sweeping views over Durrës Bay. A corridor led further upward to the belvedere balcony, intended as the king’s private office and outlook point.

The interiors reflected a restrained neoclassical idiom with imported Italian marbles and bronze finishes, while the exterior, more sober and rationalist, echoed the monumental language of Fascist-period architecture. Together, these spaces fused ceremonial grandeur with functional circulation, symbolising both royal authority and modernity.

=== Symbolism ===
Architectural historians have noted that the villa was more than a residence: it symbolised Zog’s ambition to present Albania as a modern European monarchy. Its blend of Italian Rationalist style and national motifs reflected Albania’s political alignment with Fascist Italy in the 1930s, while also asserting sovereign identity.

== Current condition ==
As of 2025 the villa remains closed to the public and its interiors are heavily degraded, though structurally sound. The announced private restoration, if realised, could return it to a state resembling its late-1930s appearance.

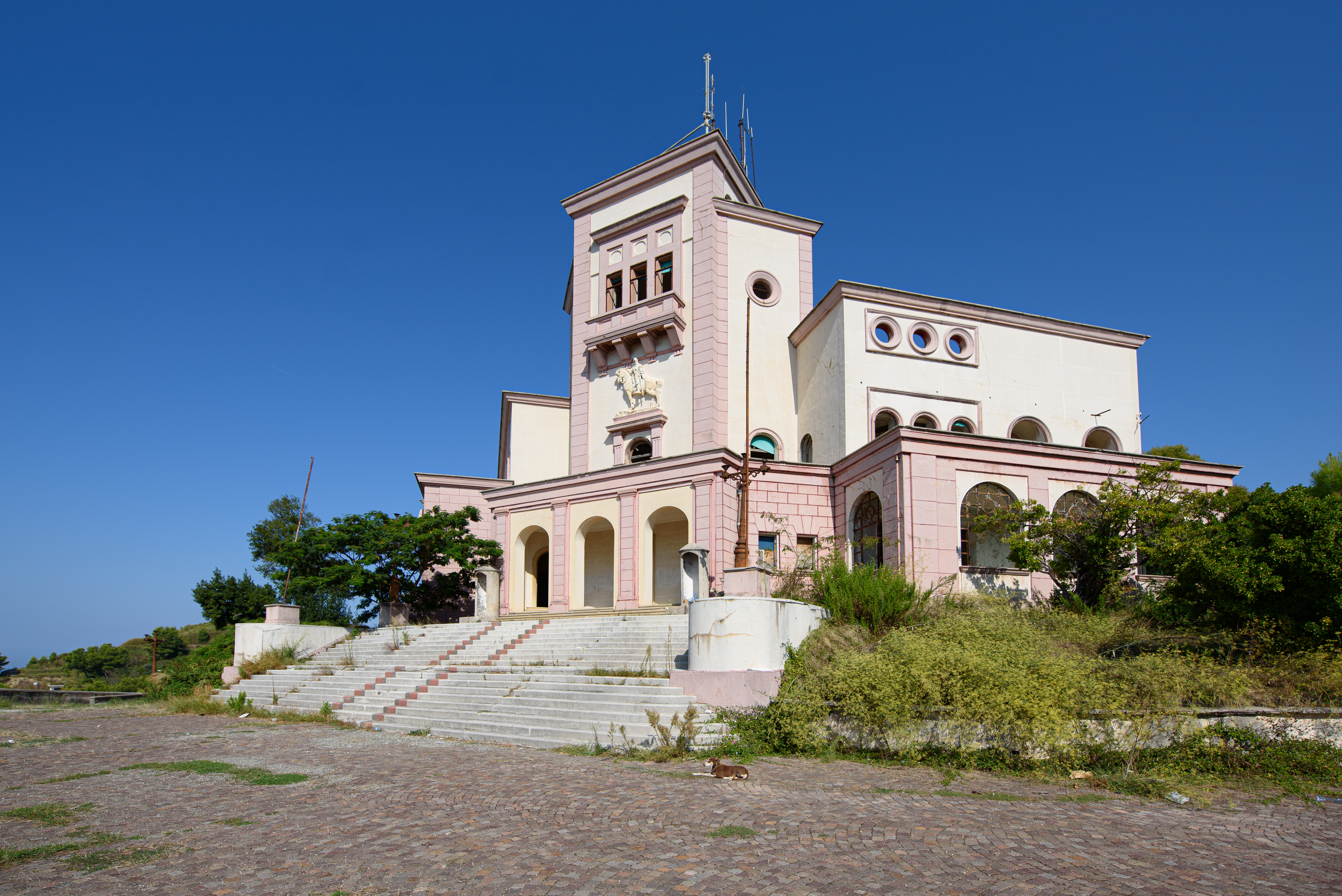
Exterior - Above the balcony above the entrance is a statue of Skanderbeg, the national hero of Albania (2019)

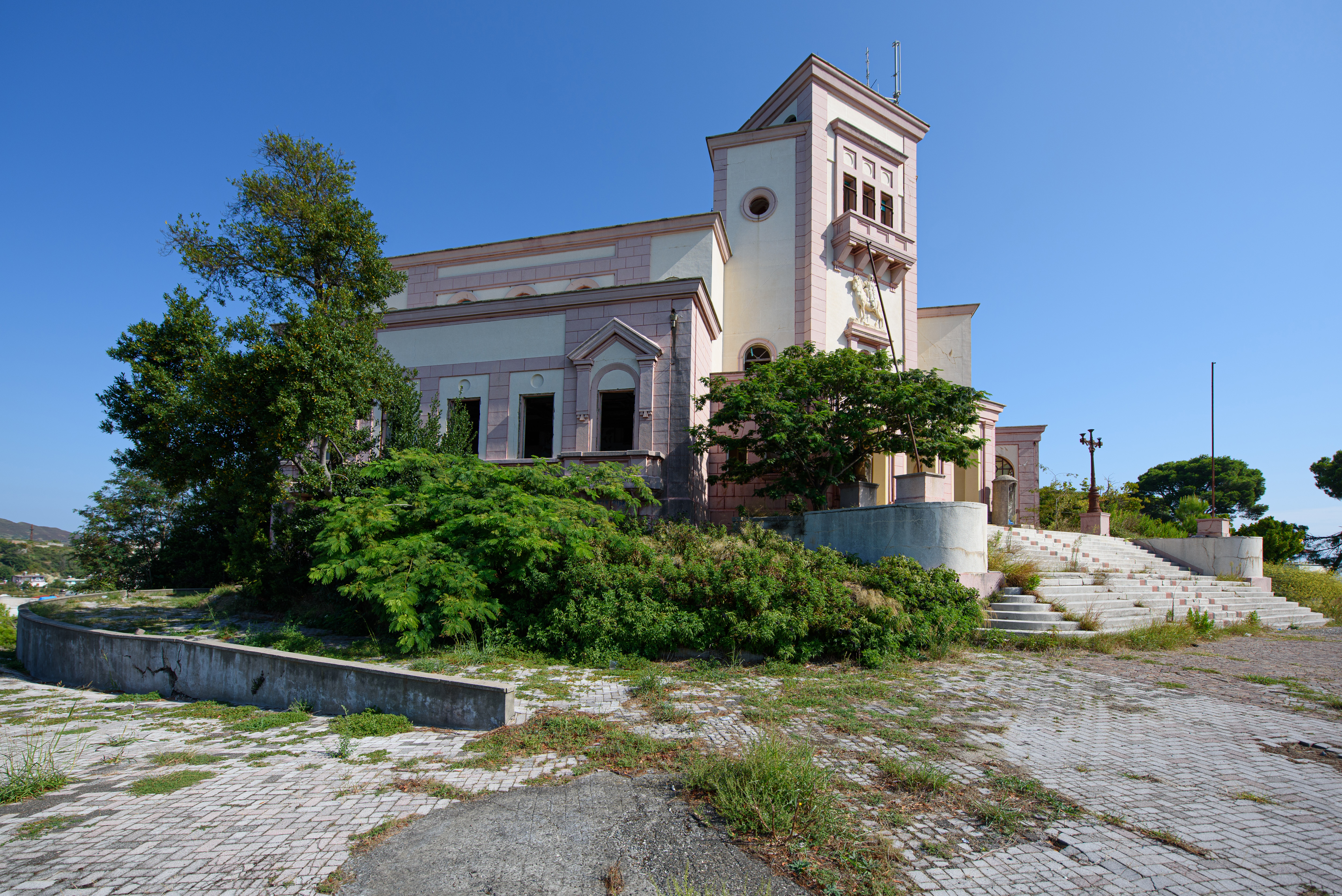
Exterior (2019)

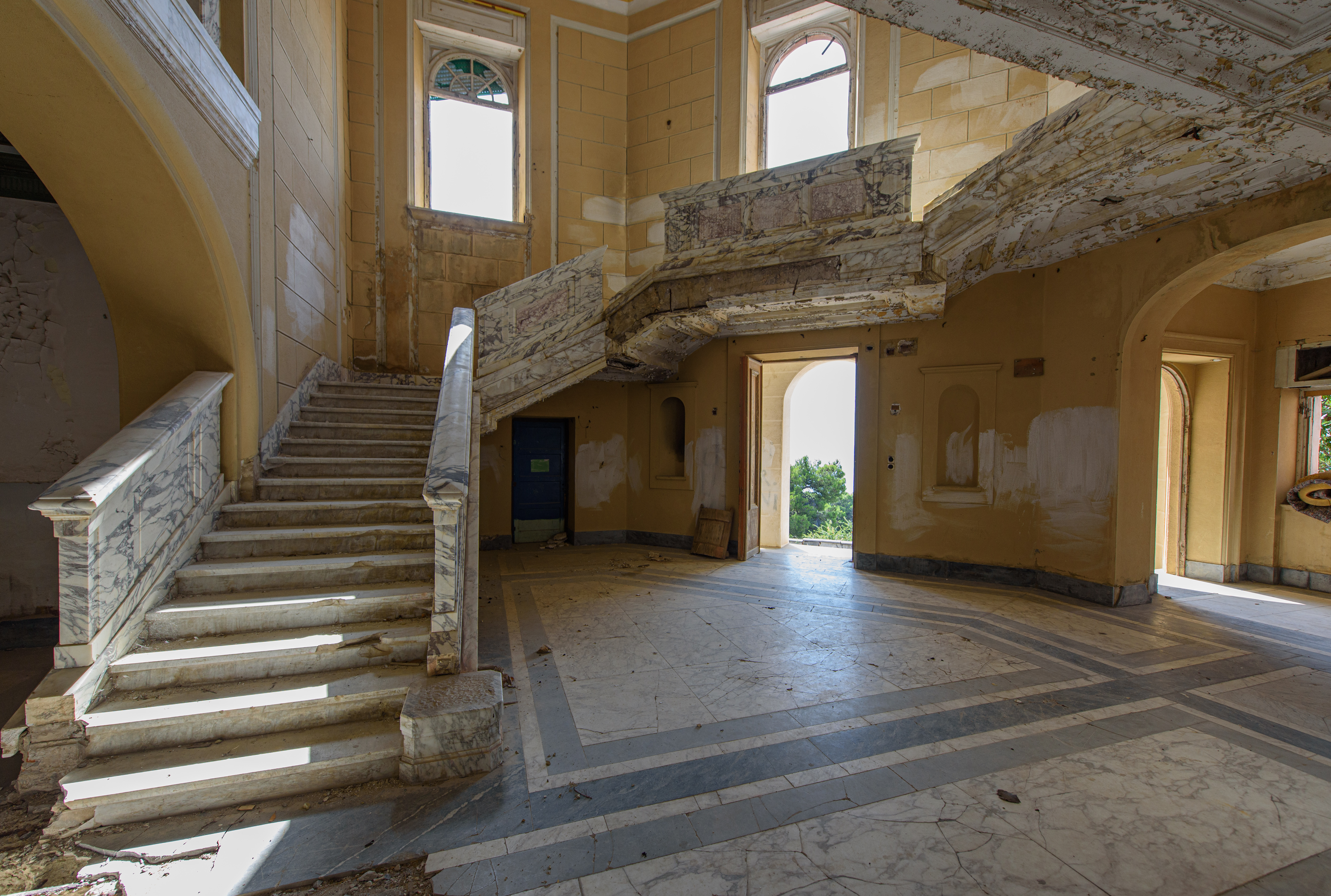
The monumental staircase (2019)

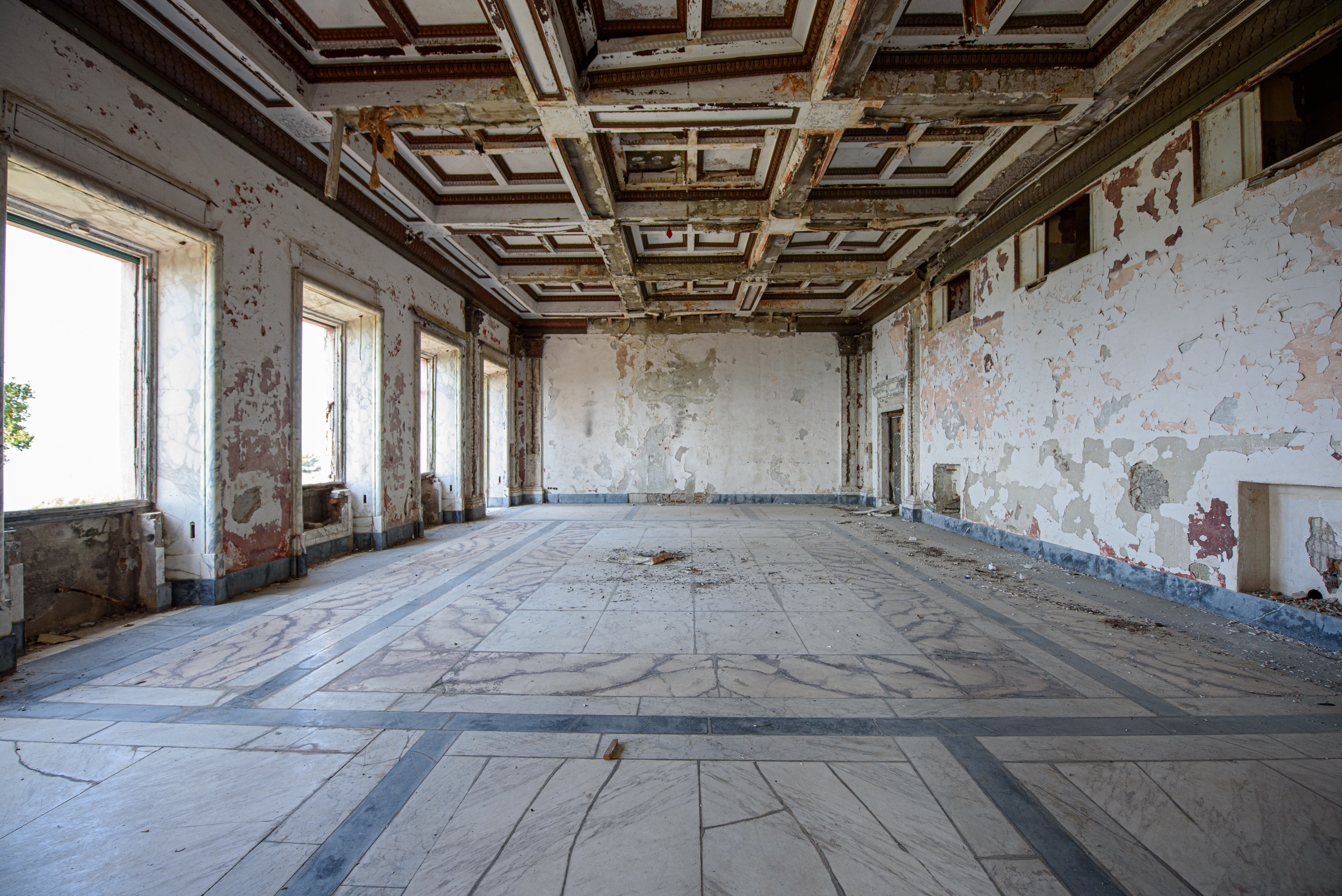
The ceremonial hall or throne room - The marble eagle is no longer on the floor anymore (2019)

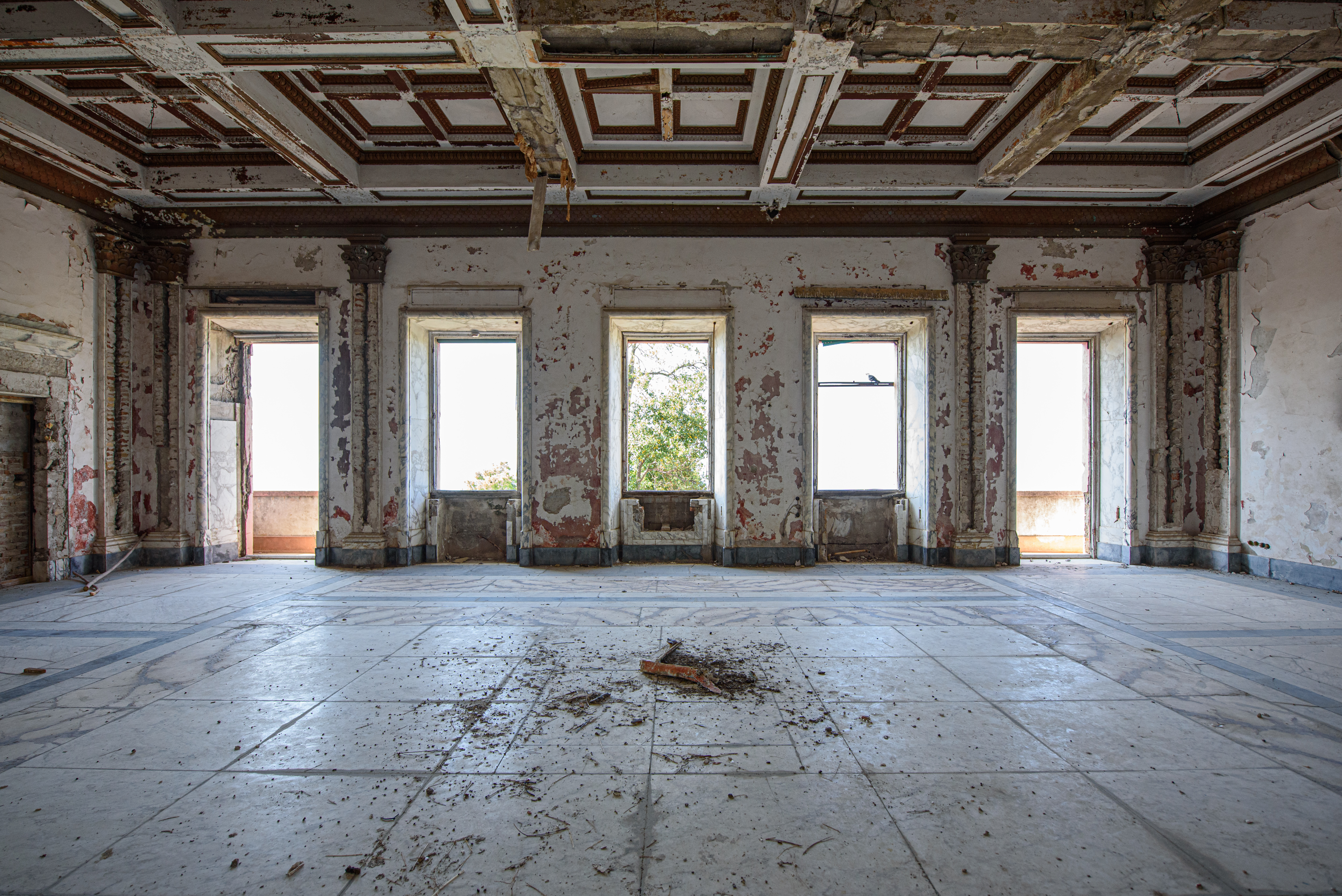
The ceremonial hall or throne room (2019)

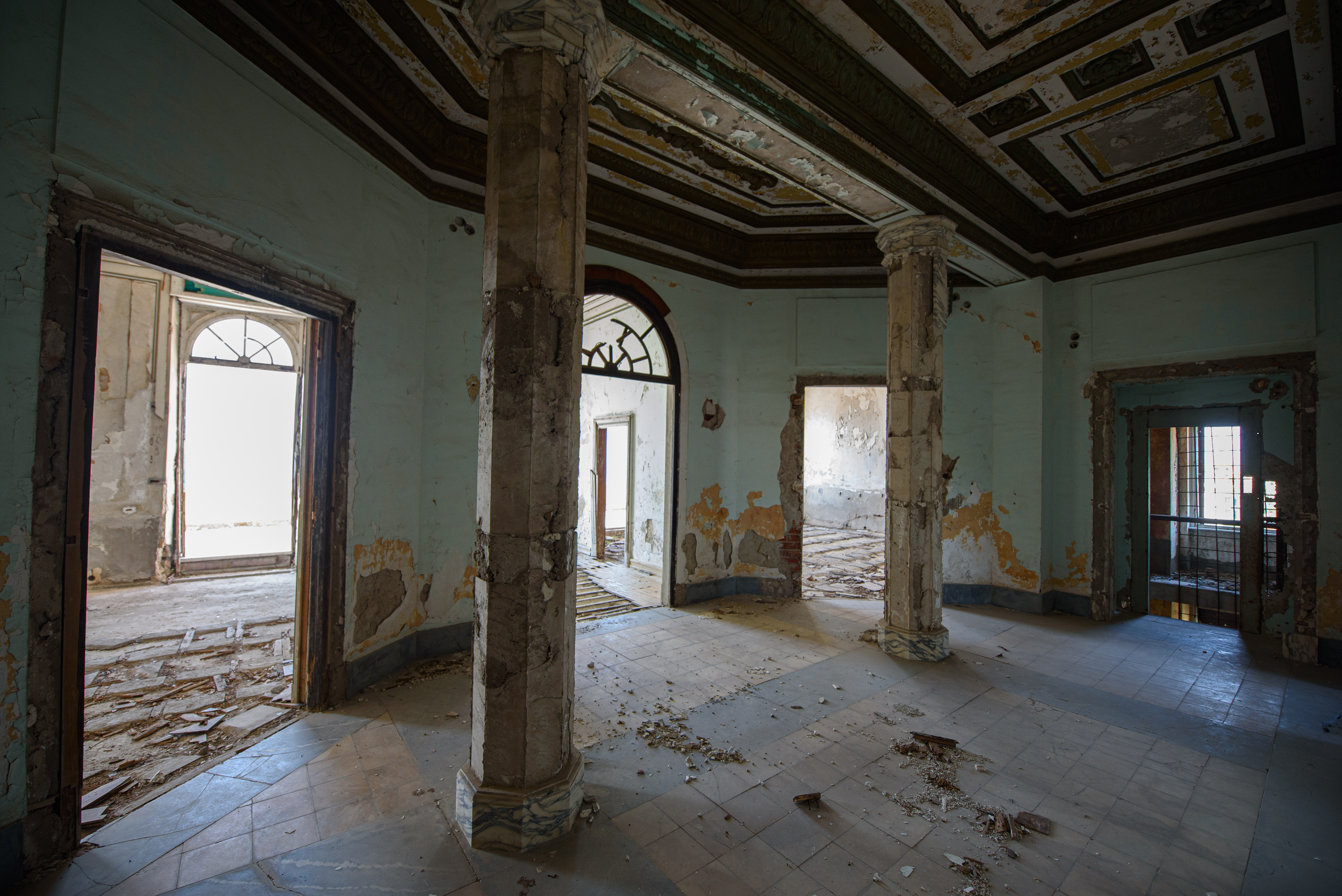
The first floor in ruins (2019)

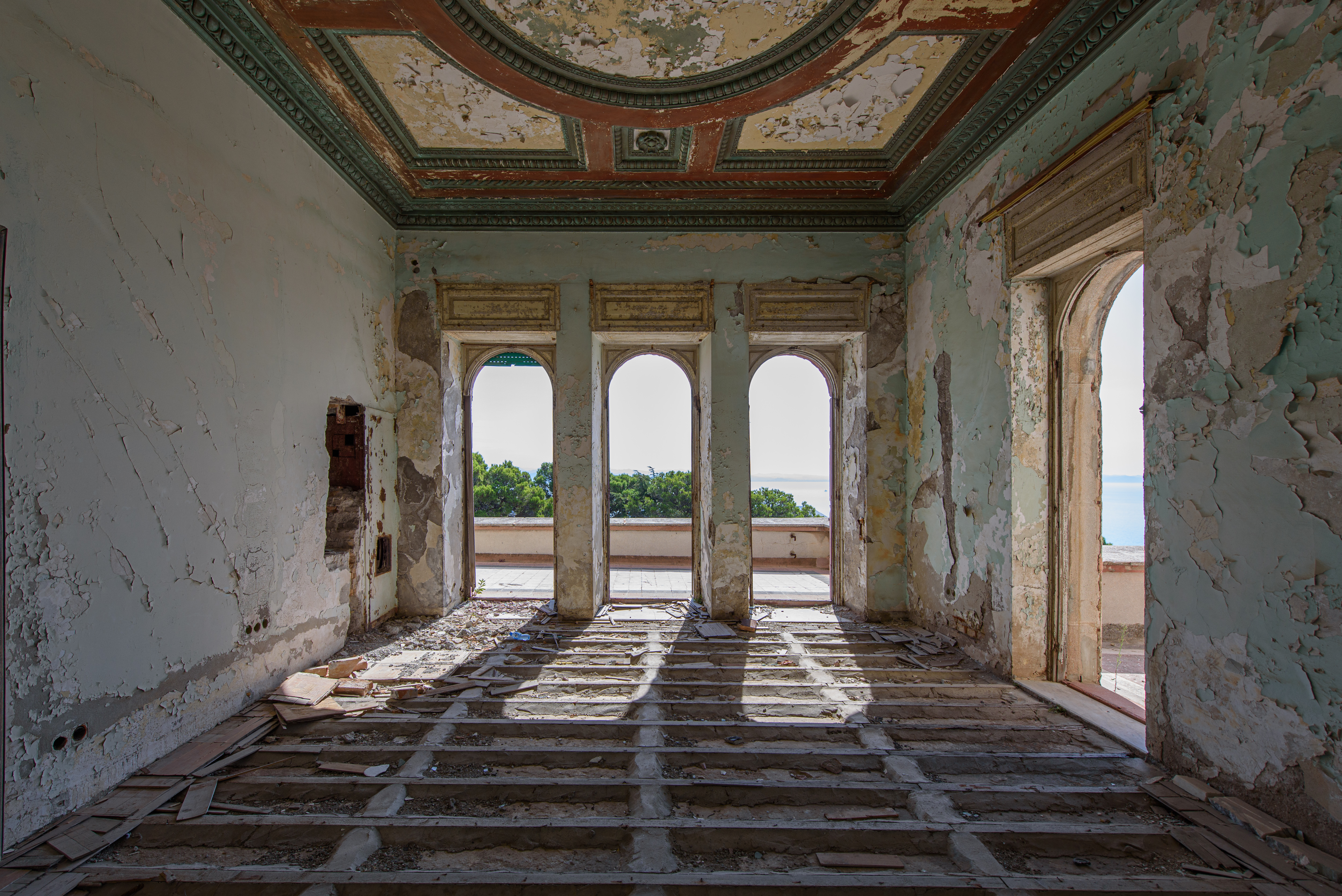
The King's study (2019)

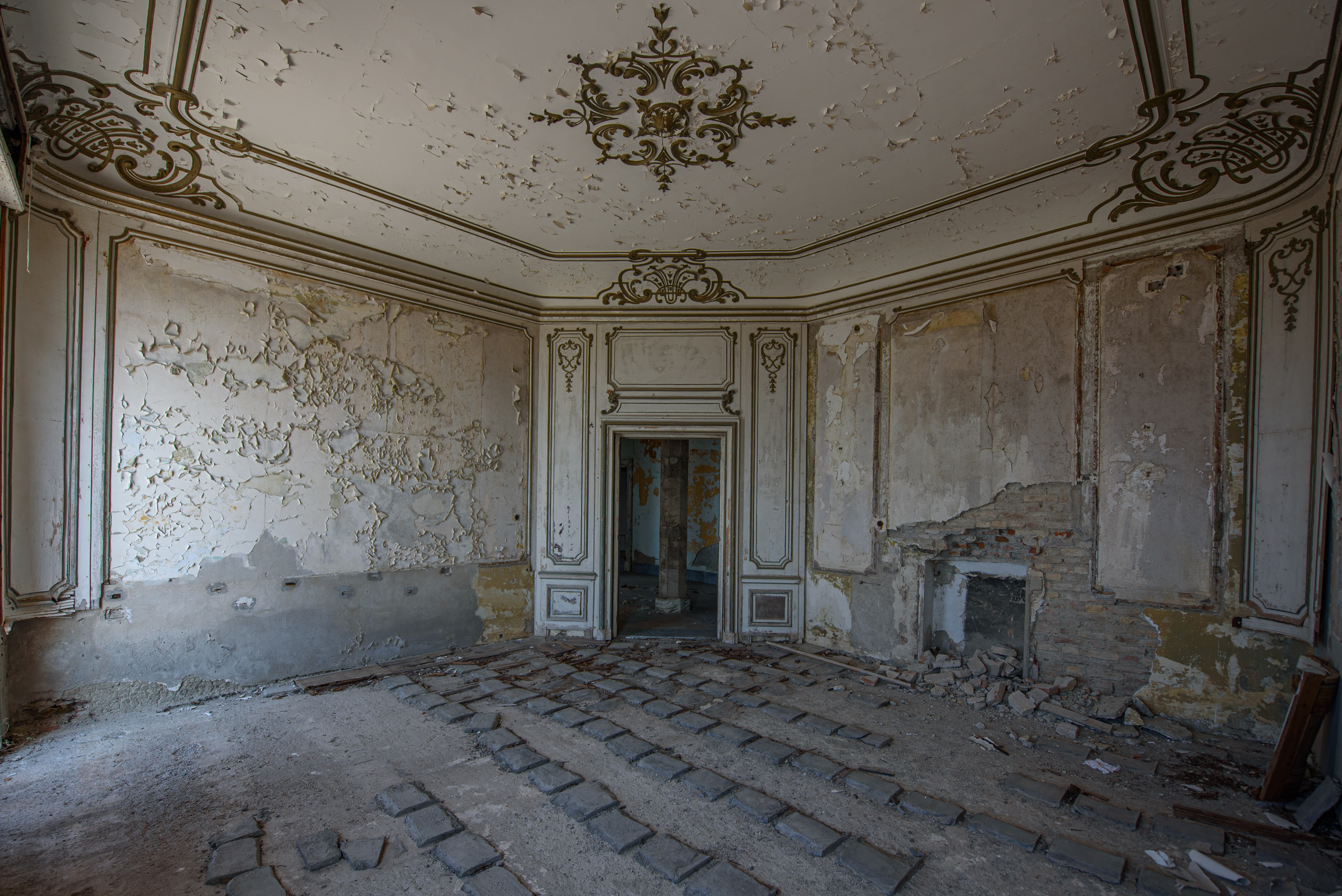
A royal bedroom (2019)

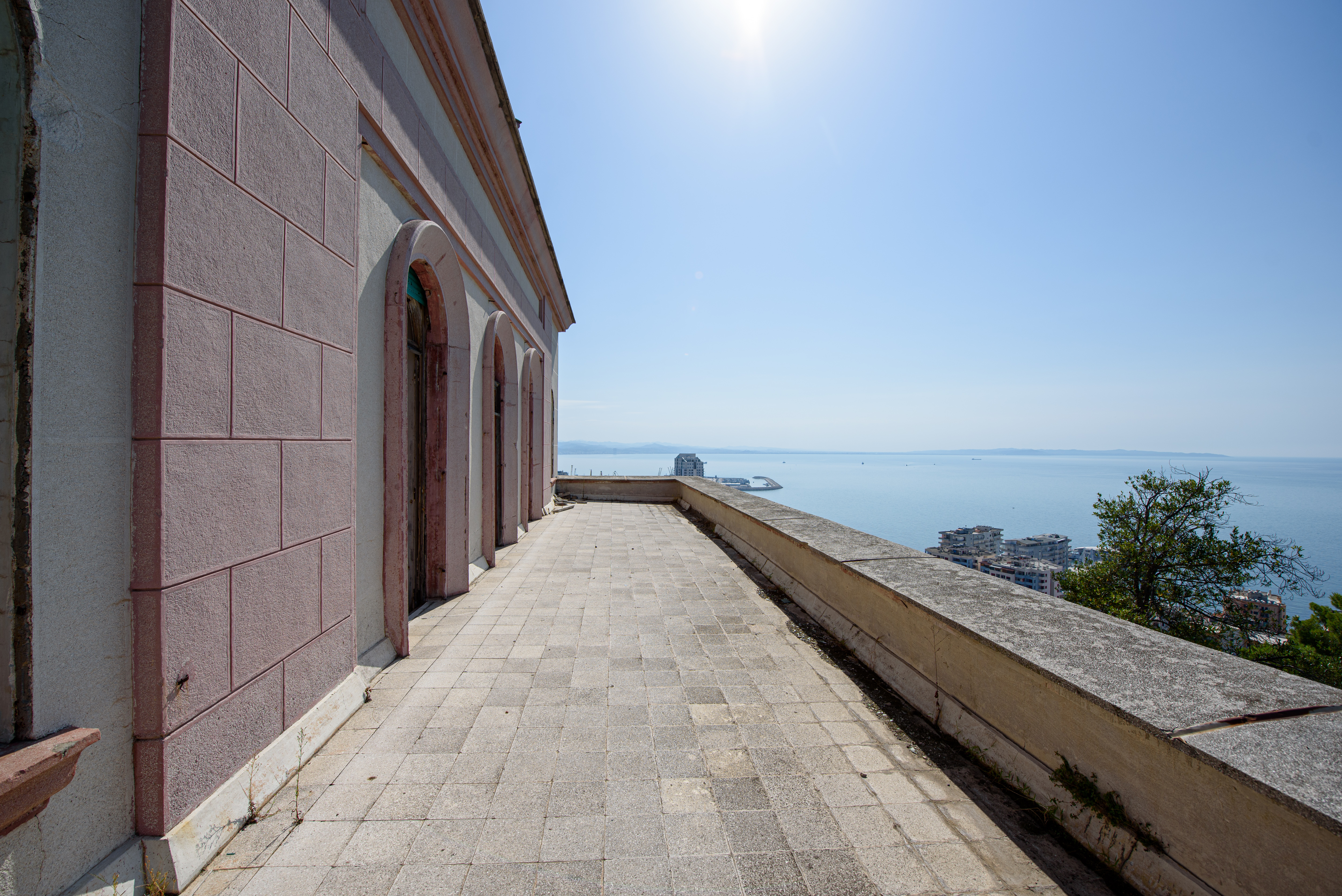
The balconies provide panoramic views of the Adriatic (2019)

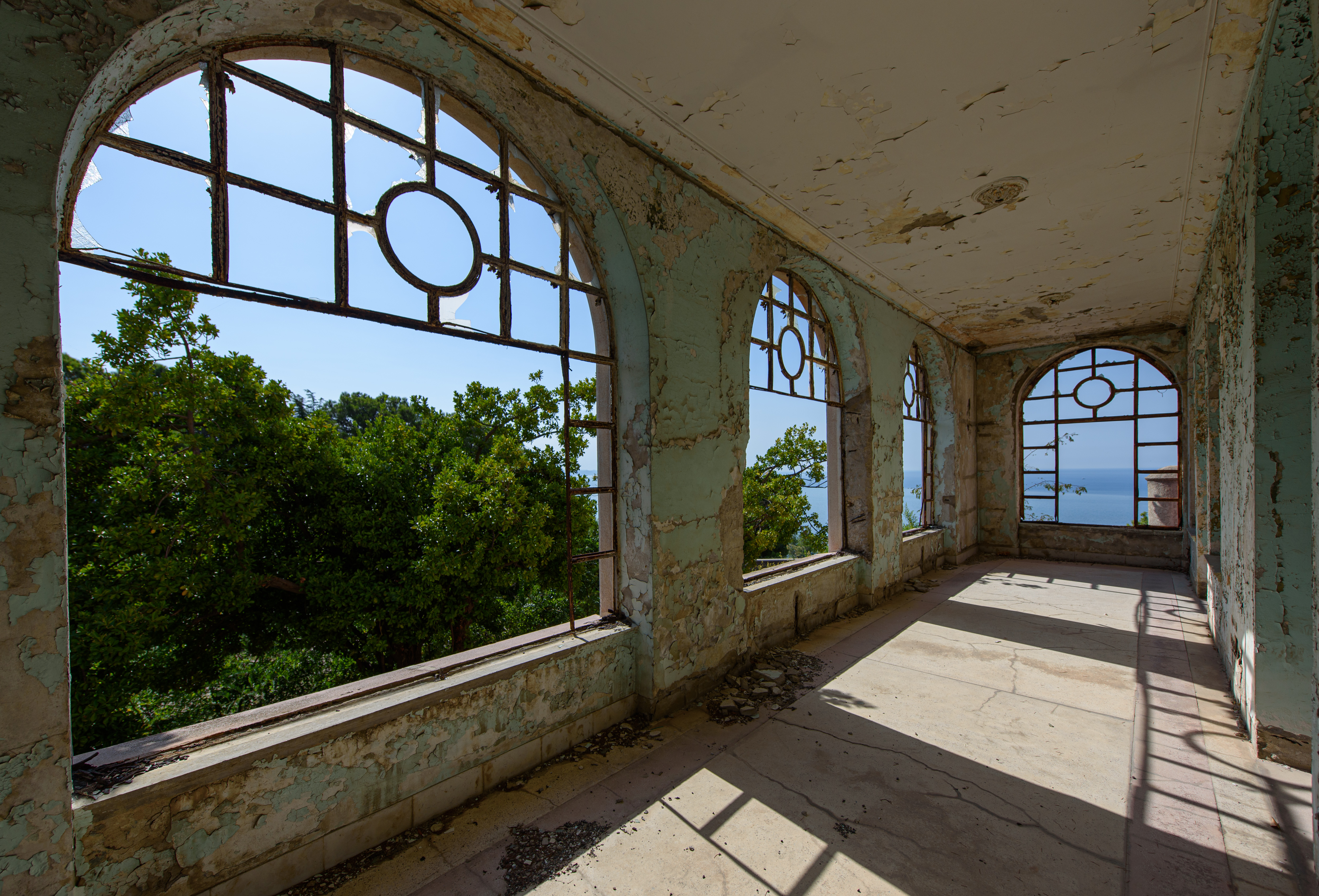
The arcaded winter veranda (2019)

== Bibliography ==
- Giusti, Maria Adriana (2006). Albania: architettura e città: 1925-1943 (in Italian). Firenze: Maschietto Editions. p. 199. ISBN 978-8888967707.
- Migliaccio, Maria Concetta (2012). "Identità e architettura nell'esperienza albanese di Florestano Di Fausto in Godoli". In Godoli, Ezio; Tramonti, Ulisse (eds.). Architetti E Ingegneri Italiani in Albania (in Italian). Firenze: Edifir Edizioni. pp. 33–53.
- Prifti, A. (2017). Ndikime te Arkitektures dhe te Artit Italian ne Trashegimine Shqiptare te Viteve 1925-1943 (Thesis) (in Albanian). Tirana: University of Tirana (unpublished).
- Vokshi, Armand; Nepravishta, Florian (2013). "Fausto Di Florestano - The Genesis Of New Architectural Forms In Albania". UBT International Conference. 15.
- Manahasa, Edmond; Habili, Habili (2022). "An adaptive reuse proposal for king Zog Royal residence in Durres, Albania" (PDF). Fourth International Conference on Architecture and Urban Design.

== See also ==
- Zog I of Albania
- Royal Palace of Tirana
- Florestano Di Fausto
- History of Durrës
