= List of palaces in France =

List of palaces located in France

France has many palaces throughout its vast territory. The list is incomplete.

== Paris ==
- Conciergerie, site of the first royal palace, now part of the Palais de Justice
- Grand Palais, site of the Universal Exposition of 1900
- École Militaire, military school
- Hôtel de Matignon, official residence of the Prime Minister
- Hôtel de Sully
- Hôtel Lambert
- Palais Bourbon, home of the French National Assembly
- Palais Brongniart, location of the Paris Bourse (stock exchange)
- Palais de l'Elysée, presidential palace of France from 1848 to 1852, 1874–1940, and then from 1946 until now
- Palais de la Cité, also simply known as le Palais, first royal palace of France, from before 1000 until 1363; now the seat of the courts of justice of Paris and of the Court of Cassation (the supreme court of France)
- Palais de la Légion d'honneur
- Palais du Louvre, second royal palace of France, from 1364 until 1789; now the Louvre Museum
- Palais du Luxembourg, home of the French Senate
- Palais Royal, originally the home of Richelieu, it became a royal palace when the young King Louis XIV, his mother Anne of Austria, and Mazarin moved in; later belonged to the dukes of Orléans; now the seat of the Conseil d'État and of the Ministry of Culture
- Palais des Tuileries, third royal/imperial palace of France, 1789–1792, 1804–1848, 1852–1870, destroyed in 1871
- Petit Palais, home of the Paris Museum of Fine Arts (Musée de Beaux Arts)

== Versailles ==
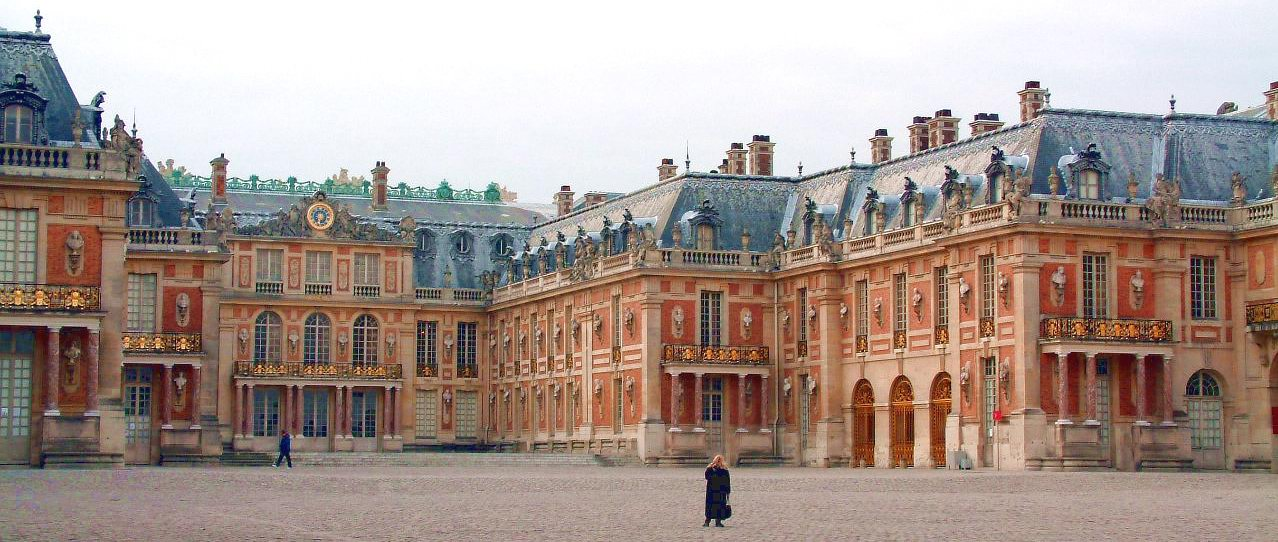
Château de Versailles

- Château de Versailles, former main residence of the French royal family
- Grand Trianon
- Petit Trianon

== Île-de-France ==
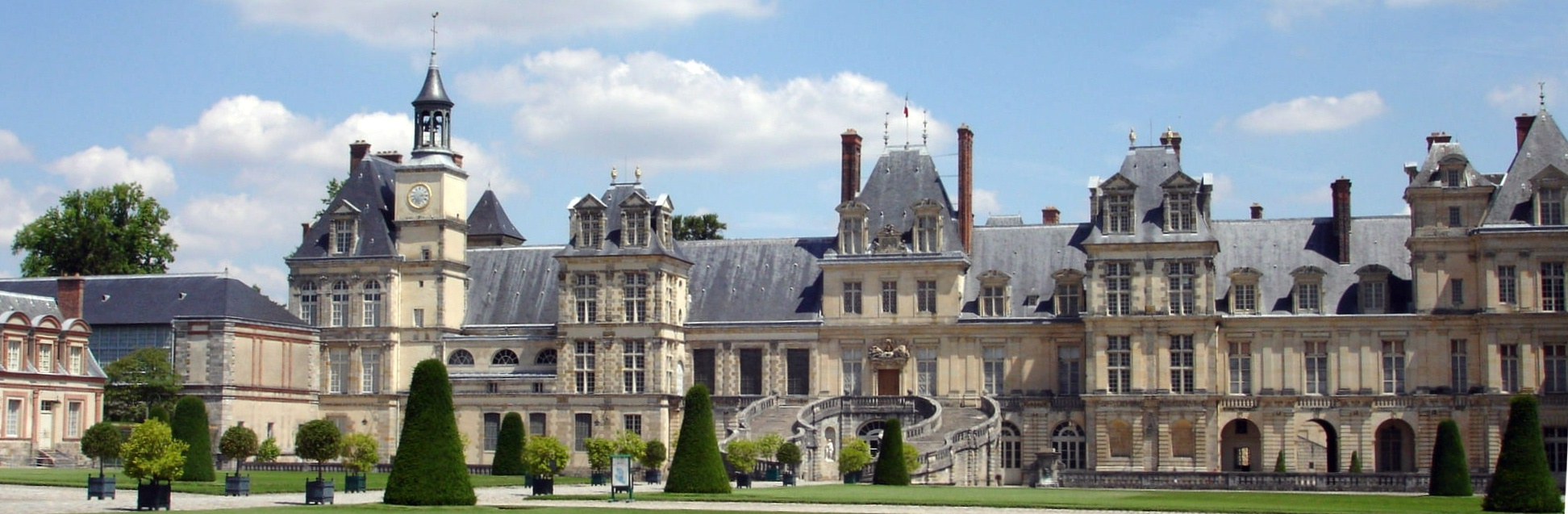
Château de Fontainebleau

- Château de Bagatelle, Neuilly-sur-Seine
- Château de Chantilly, Chantilly
- Château de Compiègne
- Château d'Écouen, Écouen
- Château de Fontainebleau, former royal residence in Fontainebleau
- Château de La Roche-Guyon, La Roche-Guyon
- Château de Maisons-Laffitte
- Château de Rambouillet, presidential summer residence in Rambouillet
- Château de Saint-Cloud
- Château de Saint-Germain-en-Laye
- Château de Sceaux
- Château de Vaux-le-Vicomte
- Château de Vincennes

== Elsewhere ==
- Château d'Amboise
- Château d'Anet
- Château d'Angers
- Château d'Azay-le-Rideau
- Château de Blois
- Château de Brézé
- Château de Cayx, Cahors, a residence of the Danish Royal Family
- Château de Chambord
- Château de Châteaudun
- Château de Châteauneuf
- Château de Chantilly
- Château de Chaumont
- Château de Chenonceau
- Château de Cheverny
- Château de Commercy
- Château de Condé
- Château de Dissay
- Château d'Ételan
- Château de Lunéville
- Château de Montbéliard
- Château de la Mothe-Chandeniers
- Château de Nexon
- Château de Pierrefonds
- Château de la Rivière Bourdet
- Château de Saumur
- Château de Talcy
- Château de Valençay
- Château de Villandry
- Château de Vitré
- Château de Saumur
- Château des ducs de Savoie
- Château de Sully-sur-Loire
- Château d'Ussé
- Palais des ducs et des États de Bourgogne, Dijon (palace of the famous dukes of Burgundy)
- Palais des Papes, Avignon (palace of the popes in the Middle Ages)
- Palace of the Kings of Majorca, Perpignan
- Palais des rois de Navarre, Pau (palace of the kings of Navarre)
- Palais ducal de Nancy, Nancy (palace of the dukes of Lorraine)
- Palais ducal de Nevers, Nevers (palace of the dukes of Nevers)
