= Saranda Mosque =

Mosque in Sarandë, Albania

Coordinates: 39°52′28″N 20°00′21″E

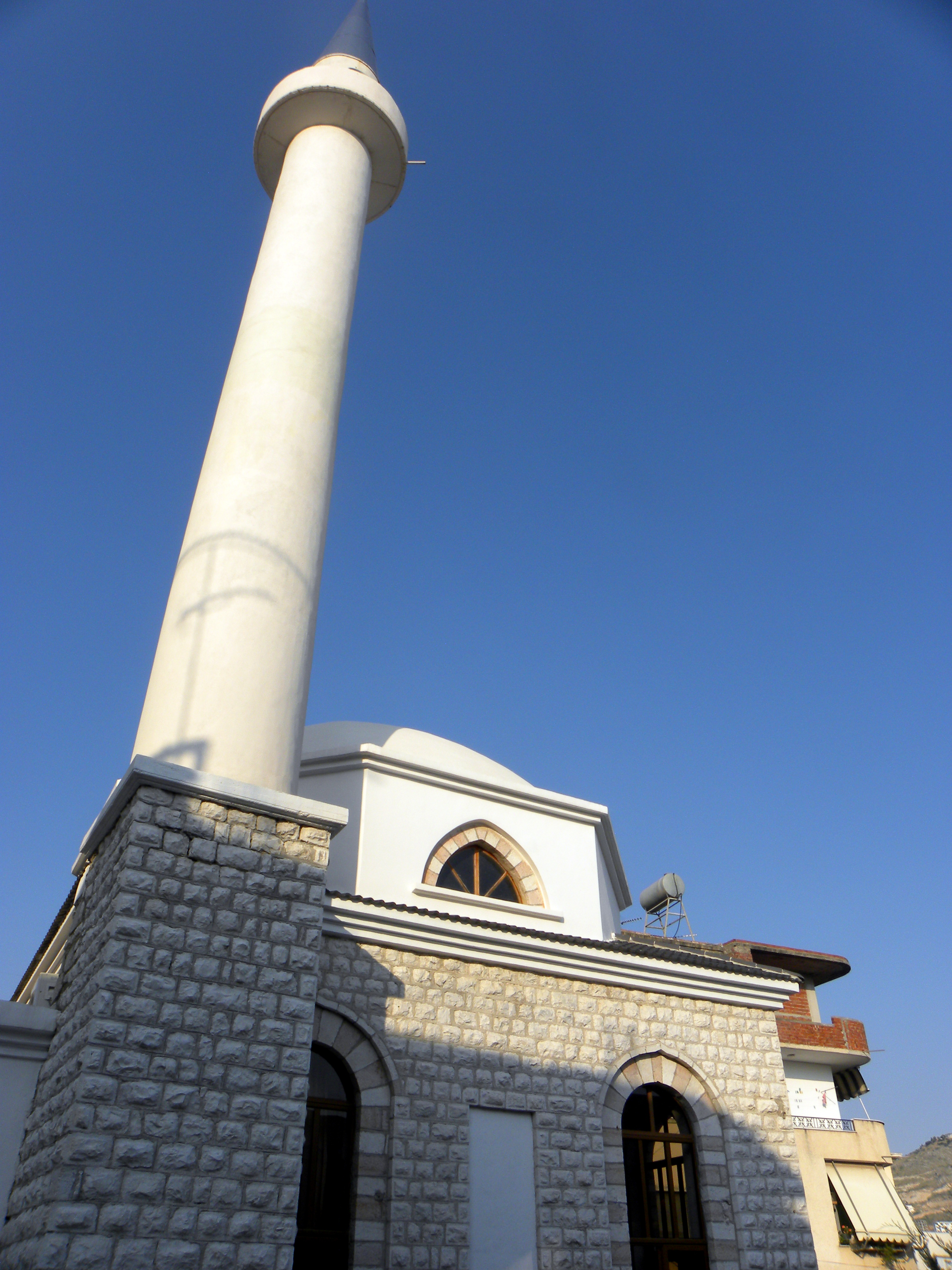
Xhamia e Sarandës

The Mosque of Saranda (Albanian: Xhamia e Sarandës) is a historic mosque built during the era of the Albanian Kingdom in the Southern Albanian town of Saranda. It is the only mosque that survived in the city after the destruction of Islamic heritage during the Communist dictatorship under Enver Hoxha. The sherefe and hajat (portico), have been replaced since its construction.

The mosque was built around 1935 with the contribution of the sisters of King Ahmed Zogu I. It is a combination of the rationalism of the time with elements of local Islamic architecture. It managed to survive the communist revolutionary-cultural destructions of the 1960s. As part of the People's Republic of Albania's policies, a number of Muslim Albanians were settled from northern Albania in the area and local Christians are no longer the only community in Saranda. Today, the main part of the building is preserved from the original.

The minaret was rebuilt in a simple and cheap style after 1991. Due to increased construction in the area, the mosque is more obscured than it originally was, with the minaret often being the only visible part. In recent times, the entrance area has been added and the upper mahfil has been expanded.
