= Islam in the People's Socialist Republic of Albania =

Religion in the People's Socialist Republic of Albania

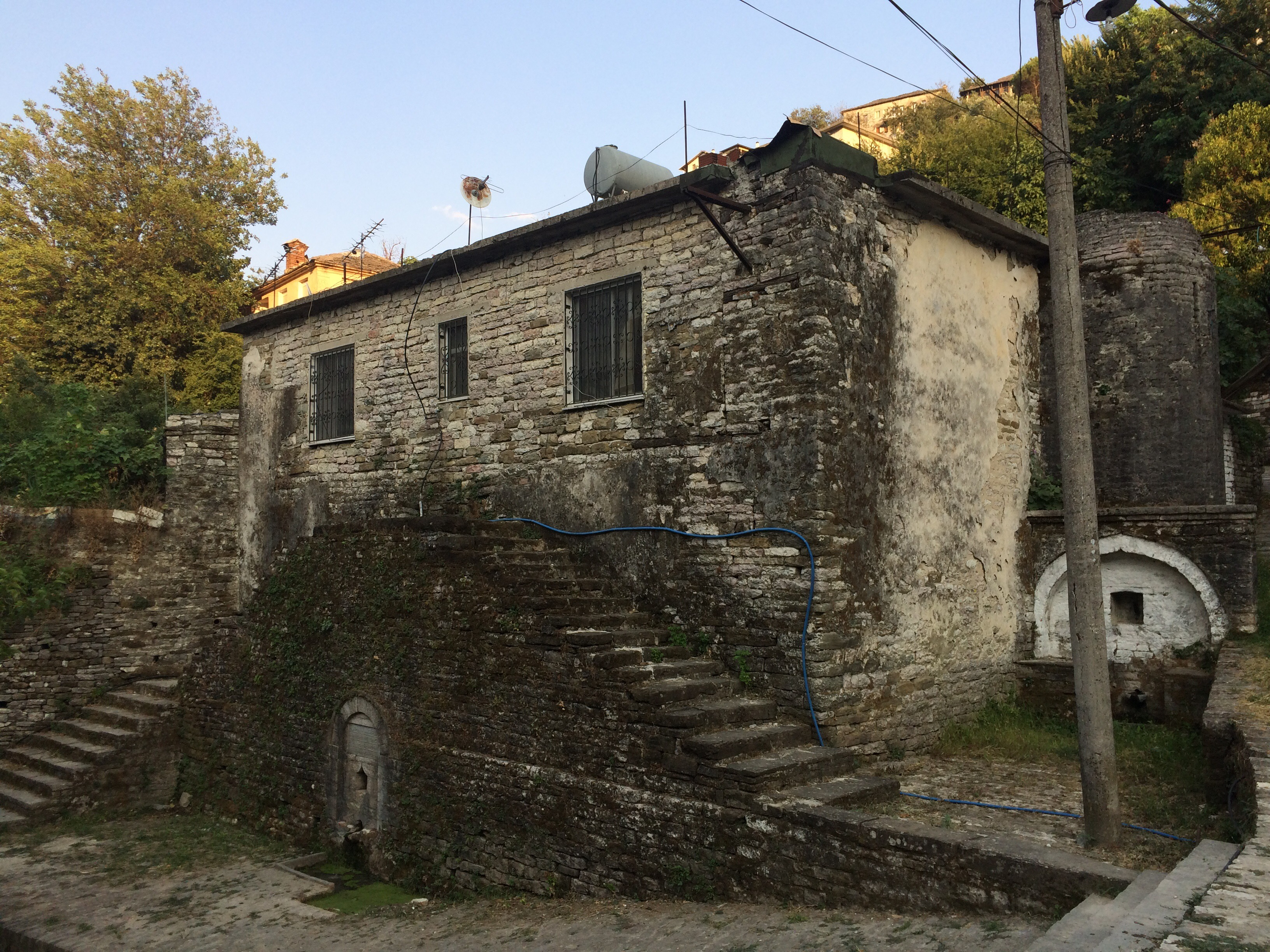
The historic 17th-century Mexhide Mosque in Gjirokastra destroyed and with its minaret torn down has been turned into a residential building

Islam in the People's Socialist Republic of Albania (1945–1991) covers a period of time when the Communist Party of Albania came to power under Enver Hoxha and exercised almost total control over the Albanian people. The communist government sought to radically overhaul Albanian society by realigning social, cultural and religious loyalties to the communist party through Albanian nationalism in the pursuit of achieving a unitary Albanian identity.

Secularizing tenets borrowed from the National Awakening and interwar period were continued and more radical approaches were adopted to sideline religion from the public sphere, allowing Albania to declare itself an atheist state in 1967. Islam as practised by Muslims within Albania experienced profound changes and persecution under communism.

Muslim clergy became imprisoned, most minarets, mosques, tekkes and Sufi shrines were destroyed, Muslim religious practices banned, adherents were spied on by the state and people who did not comply were severely punished. The effects and legacy of persecution through forced de-Islamization of society led to post-war generations born under the Albanian communist regime having minimal to almost no knowledge of Islam.

== Discrimination and emerging persecution (1945–1966) ==
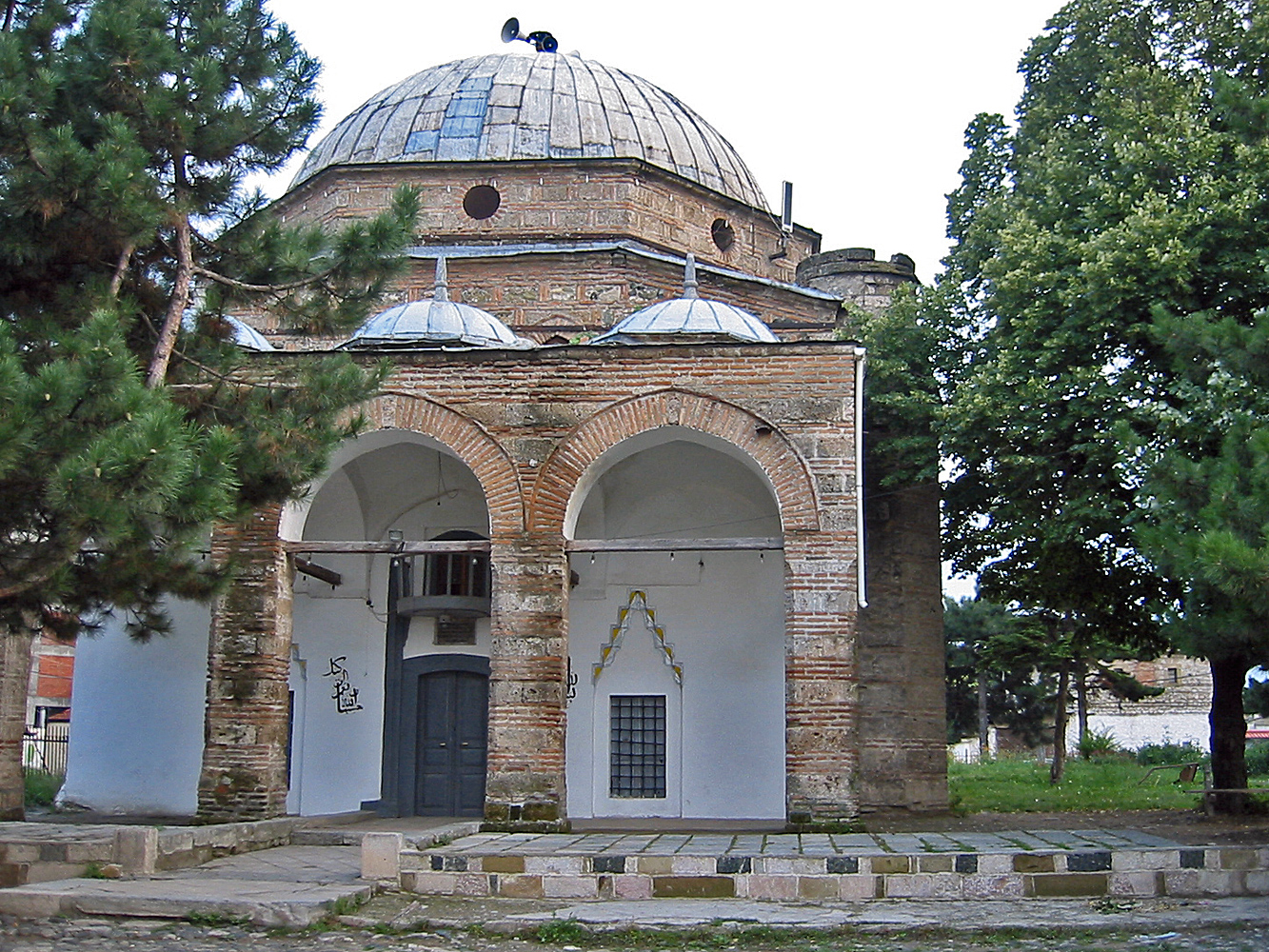
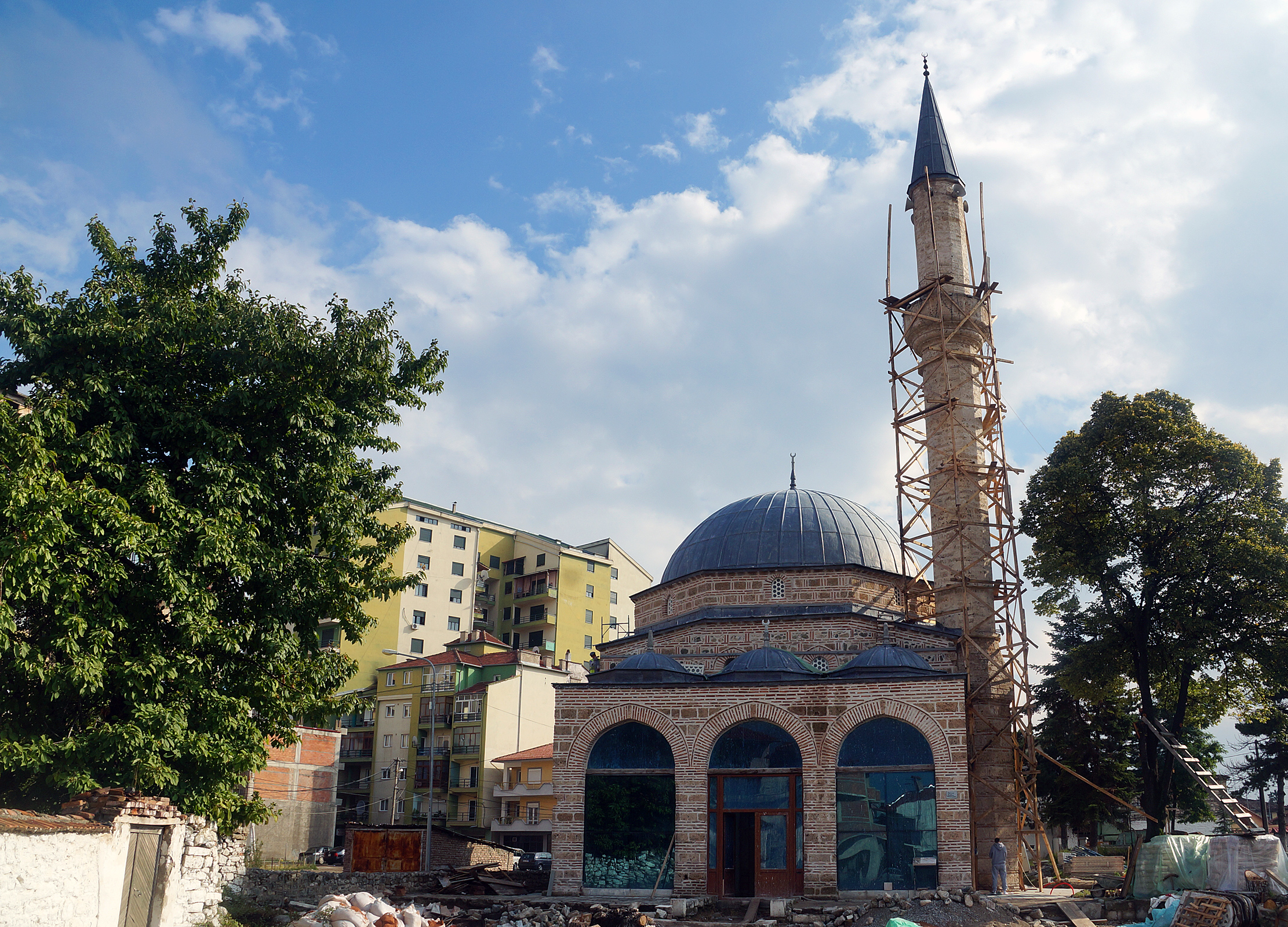
Mirahori mosque of Korçë in 2002 with destroyed minaret from communist times (left) and with rebuilt minaret in 2013 (right).

In the aftermath of World War Two, the communist regime came to power and Muslims, most from southern Albania were represented from early on within the communist leadership group such as leader Enver Hoxha 1908–1985), his deputy Mehmet Shehu (1913–1981) and others. Albanian society was still traditionally divided between four religious communities. In the Albanian census of 1945, Muslims were 72% of the population, 17.2% were Orthodox and 10% Catholic. The communist regime through the concept of national unity attempted to forge a national identity that transcended and eroded these religious and other differences with the aim of forming a unitary Albanian identity. Albanian communists viewed religion as a societal threat that undermined the cohesiveness of the nation. Within this context, religions like Islam were denounced as "foreign" and clergy such as Muslim muftis were criticised as being socially backward with the propensity to become foreign agents and undermine Albanian interests. The Bektashi order at a congress in May 1945 reaffirmed within their statutes its independence from the Sunni community in Albania. In 1949, a law was passed that required religious institutions to inculcate feelings of loyalty among their adherents to the Albanian communist party and that all religions had to have their headquarters in Albania. Akin to the Orthodox, the Bektashis entered into agreements with the communist state without difficulties which defined what was considered acceptable activities of their religious clergy and the declaration of participation in communist propaganda campaigns. The communists during this time treated the Bektashis somewhat differently as part of their clergy and adherents were casualties during fighting in World War Two while some Albanian communist elites had Bektashi heritage. However, some Sunni Muslim clergy individuals such as Mustafa Efendi Varoshi (mufti of Durrës), Hafez Ibrahim Dibra (former great mufti of Albania) and Xhemal Pazari (a prominent sheikh from Tiranë) were accused by the communists of collaborating with Axis occupying powers and imprisoned.

Religious leaders were selected by and acted as proxies for the communist party and the process was violent with Sunni Muslim leaders imprisoned and killed while the Bektashi head suffered a similar fate and by 1947 the communist regime had imprisoned 44 Muslim clergy. Unlike their Christians counterparts in Albanian jails, the Muslim clergy imprisoned by the communist regime received little to no attention internationally regarding their plight apart from diaspora Albanian organisations. The Sunni Albanian community by 1949 under grand mufti Hafiz Musa Ali attempted to attain some measures and conditions from Enver Hoxha. Some of those included financial assistance, the exemption of future Muslim clergy doing army service which was supported while a translation of the Quran into Albanian was rejected. In 1950, the communist government implemented Act 743 that outlined measures for negotiating the status of the four religions in Albania. The Sunni Community at this time was run by the Main Council and its finances came from budget subsidiaries and property donations. As the Bektashi order of Albania was the worldwide headquarters of Bektashism, contact with outside communities linked to them were allowed by the communists though denied for other religions in Albania. In 1955 Hafiz Suleyman Myrto became grand mufti of the Muslim community and from May 1966 to February 1967 Hafiz Esad Myftia was the last grand mufti of Albania of the communist era. After 1945, material wealth, institutional properties and land such as a Muslim vakëf (wakf) of the religious communities in Albania were confiscated by the state to limit the ability of the religious communities to be economically self-reliant. The madrasa at Tiranë was closed down in 1965 and many mosques had undergone a state of dilapidation due to meagre finances to repair them.

Muslim architectural heritage was perceived by Albanian communists to be an unwanted vestige of the Ottoman period used for converting Albanians into Muslims. In 1965 the communist regime initiated a cultural revolution based on the Chinese model that saw the wide scale destruction of most mosque minarets due to them being a prominent feature of Islamic architecture. By 1967 only 60 Bektashi tekkes were left functioning. Within the context of the communist regime's anti religion policies, from the 1960s onward parents were encouraged to give newborn children non-religious given names. These were considered proper Albanian names and often ascribed a supposedly "Illyrian" and pagan origin while given names associated with the Muslim or other religious traditions were strongly discouraged. The communist Albanian political establishment approached Islam as the faith of the Ottoman "invader". During communism numerous historians from Albania with nationalist perspectives (Ramadan Marmallaku, Kristo Frasheri, Skender Anamali, Stefanaq Pollo, Skender Rizaj and Arben Puto) intentionally emphasized "the Turkish savagery" and "heroic Christian resistance against" the Ottoman state in Albania. Few scholars that resisted those anti-Islamic and anti-Turkish propaganda trends were persecuted while the communist regime highlighted myths related to medieval Albanians by interpreting them as the "heroic Illyrian proletariat".

== Secularization, iconoclasm and persecution (1967–1991) ==
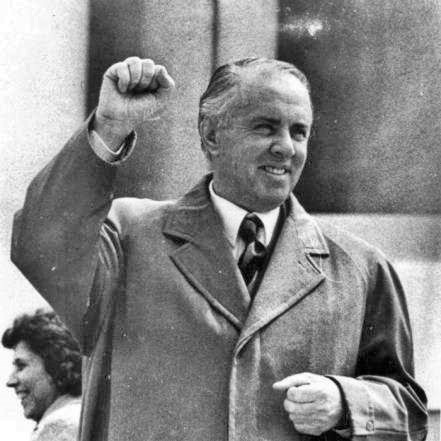
Enver Hoxha (1908–1985), communist leader of Albania.

Inspired by Pashko Vasa's late 19th century poem for the need to overcome religious differences through Albanian unity, Hoxha took the stanza "the faith of the Albanians is Albanianism" and implemented it literally as state policy. In 1967 therefore the communist government declared Albania the only non-religious and atheist country in the world, banning all forms of religious practice in public. The Muslim Sunni and Bektashi clergy alongside their Catholic and Orthodox counterparts suffered severe persecution and to prevent a decentralization of authority in Albania, many of their leaders were killed. Jumu'ah or communal Friday prayers in a mosque that involves a sermon afterwards were banned in Albania. People who still performed religious practices did so in secret, while others found out were persecuted and personal possession of religious literature such as the Quran forbidden. Amongst Bektashi adherents transmission of knowledge became limited to within few family circles that mainly resided in the countryside. Mosques became a target for Albanian communists who saw their continued existence as exerting an ideological presence in the minds of people. Through the demise of mosques and religion in general within Albania, the regime sought to alter and sever the social basis of religion that lay with traditional religious structures amongst the people and replace it with communism. Islamic buildings were hence appropriated by the communist state who often turned into them into gathering places, sports halls, warehouses, barns, restaurants, cultural centres and cinemas in an attempt to erase those links between religious buildings and people. The communist regime through policy destroyed the Muslim way of life and Islamic culture within Albania.

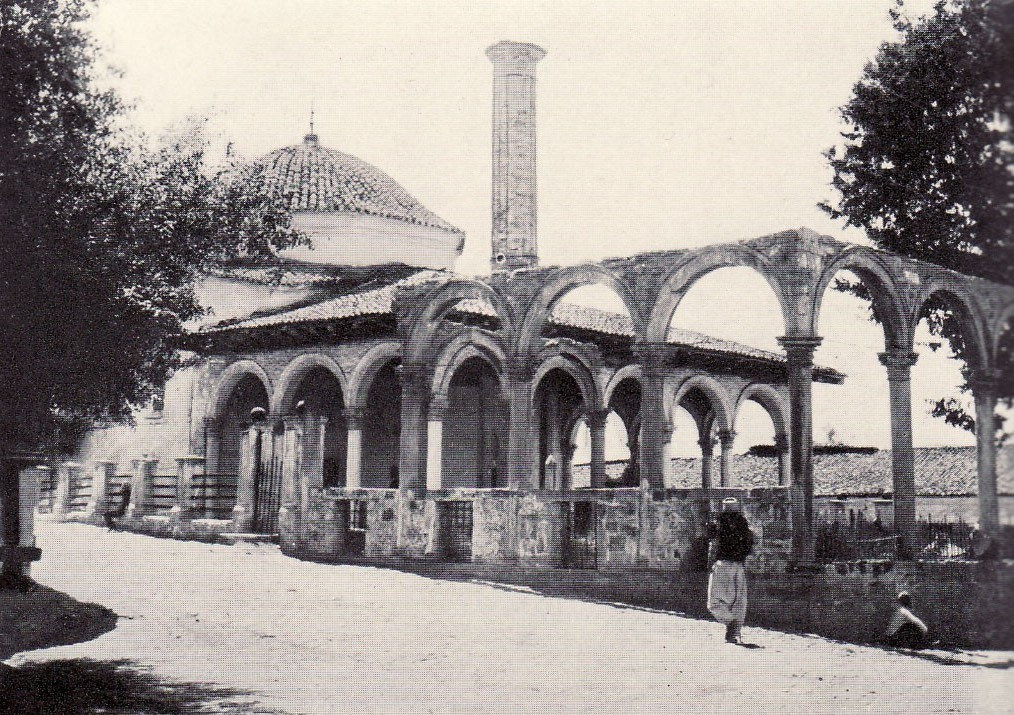
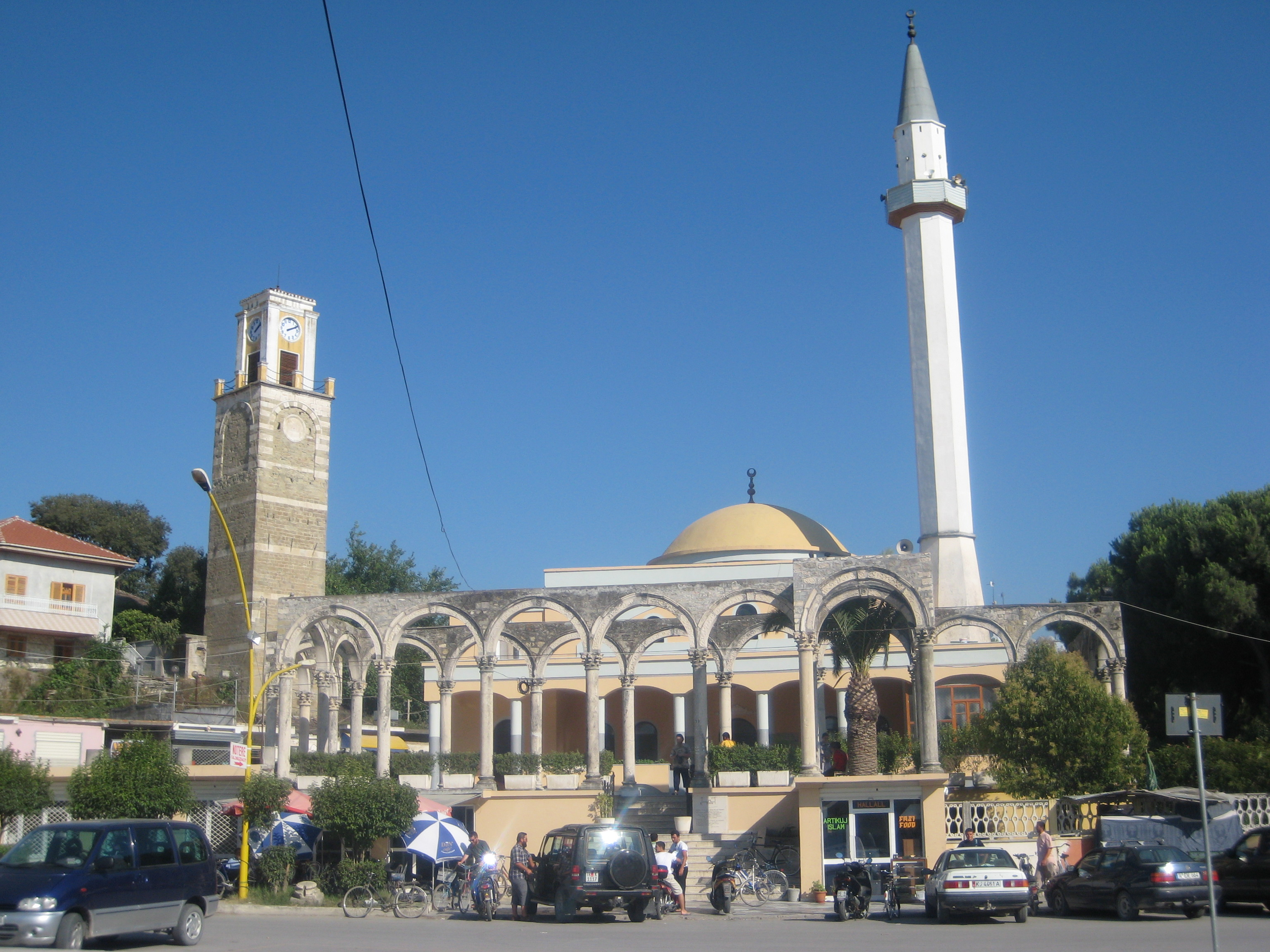
Kubelie Mosque in Kavajë, circa 1939 (left) and rebuilt mosque after communist destruction in 1967 with original colonnade, 2007 (right).

In 1967 within the space of seven months the communist regime destroyed 2,169 religious buildings and other monuments. Of those were some 530 tekkes, turbes and dergah saint shrines that belonged mainly to the Bektashi order. Pilgrimage thereafter amongst Bektashi adherents to those shrines became limited occurring only in certain locations and indirectly through gatherings like picnics near those sites such as the Sari Salltëk tyrbe in Krujë. While 740 mosques were destroyed, some of the more prominent and architecturally important ones like the Kubelie Mosque in Kavajë, the Clock Mosque in Peqin and the two 17th-century domed mosques in Elbasan were not. Of the roughly 1,127 Islamic buildings existing in Albania prior to the communists coming to power, only 50 mosques remained thereafter, with most being in a state of disrepair. Some number of mosques that were deemed structures of cultural importance and historic value by the communists did survive, such as the Muradiye mosque in Vlorë, the Lead mosque in Shkodër, the Naziresha Mosque in Elbasan, the Lead, Beqar, Hynkar and Hysen Pasha mosques of Berat, the Fatih mosque in Durrës, the Bazar mosque of Krujë, the Allajbegi mosque in Dibër County, the Mirahor mosque in Korçë, the Teqe mosque in Gjirokastër and the Gjin Aleksi mosque in Vlorë County. As it was declared a monument of culture as well, the Ethem Bey mosque of Tiranë was allowed to function as a place of prayer and Islamic ritual, though only for foreign Muslim diplomats. In Tiranë during 1991, only two mosques were in a position to be used for worship and only nine Ottoman era mosques survived the communist dictatorship. Some Albanian Muslims from southern Albania became quickly urbanised alongside the Orthodox and integrated into the state after the war. Alongside the Catholics, the Sunni Muslim Albanian population of central and northern Albania was mainly marginalised and little integrated by the Albanian state that in the 1970s and 1980s experienced overpopulation and economic hardship. As such during the late communist period, the proportion of Catholics and Albanian Muslims of these regions grew larger than the Orthodox community of southern Albania. Due to the deemphasizing of religion, some mixed marriages of Muslims with the Orthodox or with Catholics occurred in the late communist period, mostly among the elite.

== See also ==
- Islam in Albania
- Religion in Albania
- Islamization of Albania
- Islam in Albania (1800–1912)
- Islam in Albania (1913–1944)
- Cultural and Ideological Revolution

== Sources ==
- Akhtar, Shabbir (2010). Islam as political religion: The future of an Imperial Faith. New York: Routledge. ISBN 9781136901430.
- Barbullushi, Odeta (2010). "The Politics of 'Religious Tolerance' in Post-Communist Albania: Ideology, Security and Euro-Atlantic Integration". In Pace, Michelle (ed.). Europe, the USA and political Islam: Strategies for engagement. Springer. pp. 140–160. ISBN 9780230298156.
- Blumi, Isa; Krasniqi, Gëzim (2014). "Albanians' Islam". In Cesari, Jocelyne (ed.). The Oxford Handbook of European Islam. Oxford: Oxford University Press. pp. 475–516. ISBN 9780191026409.
- Bogdani, Mirela; Loughlin, John (2007). Albania and the European Union: the tumultuous journey towards integration and accession. London: IB Tauris. ISBN 9781845113087.
- Bowers, Stephen R. (1984). "The Islamic factor in Albanian policy". Institute of Muslim Minority Affairs Journal. 5 (1): 123–135. doi:10.1080/02666958408715886.
- Buturovic, Amila (2006). "European Islam". In Juergensmeyer, Mark (ed.). Global religions: An introduction. Oxford: Oxford University Press. pp. 437–446. ISBN 9780199727612.
- Clark, Peter (1988). "Islam in contemporary Europe". In Clarke, Peter; Friedhelm, Hardy; Houlden, Leslie; Sutherland, Stewart (eds.). The World's Religions. London: Routledge. pp. 498–519. ISBN 9781136851858.
- Clayer, Nathalie (2003). "God in the 'Land of the Mercedes.' The Religious Communities in Albania since 1990". In Jordan, Peter; Kaser, Karl; Lukan, Walter (eds.). Albanien: Geographie - historische Anthropologie - Geschichte - Kultur - postkommunistische Transformation [Albania: Geography - Historical Anthropology - History - Culture - postcommunist transformation]. Frankfurt am Main: Peter Lang. pp. 277–314. ISBN 978-3-631-39416-8.
- Clayer, Nathalie (2007). "Saints and Sufi's in post-Communist Albania". In Kisaichi, Masatoshi (ed.). Popular Movements and Democratization in the Islamic World. London: Routledge. pp. 33–42. ISBN 9781134150618.
- Crampton, Richard (2013). The Balkans since the Second World War. London: Routledge. ISBN 9781317891178.
- Czekalski, Tadeusz (2013). The shining beacon of socialism in Europe: The Albanian state and society in the period of communist dictatorship 1944–1992. Krakow: Jagiellonian University Press. ISBN 9788323335153. Archived from the original on 4 May 2022.
- De Waal, Clarissa (2005). Albania Today: A portrait of post-communist turbulence. London: IB. Tauris. ISBN 9781850438595.
- Duijzings, Gerlachlus (2000). Religion and the politics of identity in Kosovo. London: Hurst & Company. ISBN 9781850654315.
- Füsun, Özerdem; Hunter, Alan (2013). "Religion in Turkey's domestic and international agendas: Human security perspectives". In Özerdem, Alpaslan; Özerdem, Füsun (eds.). Human Security in Turkey: Challenges for the 21st century. Routledge. ISBN 9781136658105.
- Jelavich, Barbara (1983). History of the Balkans. Cambridge: Cambridge University Press. p. 379. ISBN 9780521274593. "Enver Hoxha shehu Muslims."
- Jordan, Peter (2015). "An exception in the Balkans: Albania's Multiconfessional Identity". In Brunn, Stanley D. (ed.). The changing world religion map: Sacred places, identities, practices and politics. Dordrecht: Springer. pp. 1577–1598. ISBN 9789401793766.
- Kopanski, Atuallah Bogdan (1997). "Islamization of Albanians in the Middle Ages: The primary sources and the predicament of the modern historiography". Islamic Studies. 36 (2/3): 191–208.
- Lederer, Gyorgy (1994). "Islam in Albania". Central Asian Survey. 13 (3): 331–359. doi:10.1080/02634939408400866.
- Manahasa, Edmond; Kolay, Aktuğ (2015). "Observations on the existing Ottoman mosques in Albania" (PDF). ITU Journal of the Faculty of Architecture. 12 (2): 69–81. Archived from the original (PDF) on 5 October 2018.
- Poulton, Hugh (1995). Who are the Macedonians?. Bloomington: Indiana University Press. ISBN 9781850652380.
- Nurja, Ermal (2012). "The rise and destruction of Ottoman Architecture in Albania: A brief history focused on the mosques". In Furat, Ayşe Zişan; Er, Hamit (eds.). Balkans and Islam Encounter, Transformation, Discontinuity, Continuity. Cambridge: Cambridge Scholars Publishing. pp. 191–207. ISBN 9781443842839.
- Ramet, Sabrina (1998). Nihil obstat: religion, politics, and social change in East-Central Europe and Russia. Durham: Duke University Press. ISBN 9780822320708.
- Trix, Frances (1994). "The Resurfacing of Islam in Albania". East European Quarterly. 28 (4): 533–549. Archived from the original on 25 July 2020 – via Questia.
- Vickers, Miranda (2011). The Albanians: a modern history. London: IB Tauris. ISBN 9780857736550.
- Waardenburg, Jacques (2003). Muslims and others: Relations in context. Berlin: Walter de Gruyter. ISBN 9783110200959.
