= Islam in Albania (1800–1912) =

Islam had become consolidated within Albania by the beginning of the 19th century. This period followed the conversion of a majority of Albanians to Islam in the 17th- and 18th-centuries. With the Eastern Crisis of the 1870s and its geopolitical implications of partition for Albanians, the emerging National Awakening became a focal point of reflection and questioned the relationship between Muslim Albanians, Islam and the Ottoman Empire. These events and other changing social dynamics revolving around Islam would come to influence how Albanians viewed the Muslim faith and their relationship to it. Those experiences and views carried on in the 20th century had profound implications on shaping Islam in Albania that surfaced during the communist era.

== Background ==
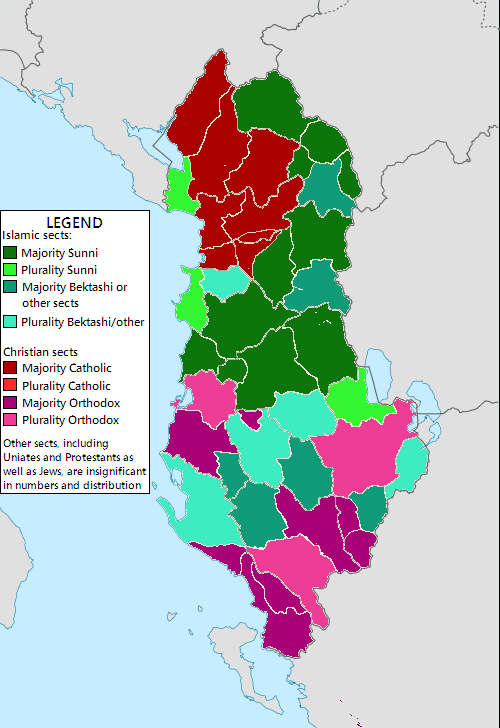
Approximate distribution of religions in Albania during early 1900s, based on the 1908 Ottoman census and the 1916–18 Austro-Hungarian census. Sunni Muslims: Green. Bektashi Muslims and other Sufis: Green-Blue.

At the beginning of the 19th century Albanians were divided into three religious groups. Catholic Albanians who had some Albanian ethno-linguistic expression in schooling and church due to Austrian protection and Italian clerical patronage. Orthodox Albanians under the Patriarchate of Constantinople had liturgy and schooling in Greek and toward the late Ottoman period mainly identified with Greek national aspirations. While Muslim Albanians during this period formed around 70% of the overall Balkan Albanian population in the Ottoman Empire with an estimated population of more than a million. With the rise of the Eastern Crisis, Muslim Albanians became torn between loyalties to the Ottoman state and the emerging Albanian nationalist movement. Islam, the Sultan and the Ottoman Empire were traditionally seen as synonymous in belonging to the wider Muslim community. While the Albanian nationalist movement advocated self-determination and strived to achieve socio-political recognition of Albanians as a separate people and language within the state. Between 1839 and 1876, the Ottoman Empire initiated modernising government reforms during the Tanzimat period and the Albanian Ottoman elite opposed them, in particular of having Ottoman officials from other parts of the empire sent to govern Ottoman Albanian areas and the introduction of a new centralised military recruitment system.

== National Awakening and Islam ==
The Russo-Ottoman war of 1878 and the threat of partition of Ottoman Albanian inhabited areas amongst neighbouring Balkan states at the Congress of Berlin led to the emergence of the League of Prizren (1878–81) to prevent those aims. The league began as an organisation advocating Islamic solidarity and restoration of the status quo (pre-1878). In time it also included Albanian national demands such as the creation of a large Albanian vilayet or province which led to its demise by the Ottoman Empire. The Ottoman Empire viewed Muslim Albanians as a bulwark to further encroachment by Christian Balkan states to its territory. It therefore opposed emerging Albanian national sentiments and Albanian language education amongst its Muslim component that would sever Muslim Albanians from the Ottoman Empire. During this time the Ottoman Empire appealed to pan-Islamic identity and attempted to console Muslim Albanians for example by employing mainly them in the Imperial Palace Guard and offering their elite socio-political and other privileges. Of the Muslim Albanian elite of the time, though there were reservations regarding Ottoman central government control they remained dependent on state civil, military and other employment. For that elite, remaining within the empire meant that Albanians were a dynamic and influential group in the Balkans, while within an independent Albania connoted being surrounded by hostile Christian neighbours and open to the dictates of other European powers. Wars and socio-political instability resulting in increasing identification with the Ottoman Empire amongst some Muslims within the Balkans during the late Ottoman period made the terms Muslim and Turk synonymous. In this context, Muslim Albanians of the era were conferred and received the term Turk while preferring to distance themselves from ethnic Turks. This practice has somewhat continued amongst Balkan Christian peoples in contemporary times who still refer to Muslim Albanians as Turks, Turco-Albanians, with often pejorative connotations and historic negative socio-political repercussions. During this time small numbers of Slavic Muslims, Bosniaks from the Herzegovina Mostar area migrated due to the Herzegovina Uprising (1875) and Slavic Muslims expelled (1878) by Montenegrin forces from Podgorica both settled in a few settlements in north-western Albania.

These geo-political events nonetheless pushed Albanian nationalists, including large numbers of Muslims, to distance themselves from the Ottomans, Islam and the then emerging pan-Islamic Ottomanism of Sultan Abdulhamid II. Another factor overlaying these concerns during the Albanian National Awakening (Rilindja) period were thoughts that Western powers would only favour Christian Balkan states and peoples in the anti Ottoman struggle. During this time Albanian nationalists conceived of Albanians as a European people who under Skanderbeg resisted the Ottoman Turks that later subjugated and cut the Albanians off from Western European civilisation. Another measure for nationalists promoting the Skanderbeg myth among Albanians was for them to turn their backs on their Ottoman heritage which was viewed as being the source of the Albanians' predicament. From 1878 onward Albanian nationalists and intellectuals, some who emerged as the first modern Albanian scholars were preoccupied with overcoming linguistic and cultural differences between Albanian subgroups (Gegs and Tosks) and religious divisions (Muslim and Christians). Muslim (Bektashi) Albanians were heavily involved with the Albanian National Awakening producing many figures like Faik Konitza, Ismail Qemali, Midhat Frashëri, Shahin Kolonja and others advocating for Albanian interests and self-determination. Representing the complexities and interdependencies of both Ottoman and Albanians worlds, these individuals and others during this time also contributed to the Ottoman state as statesmen, military personnel, religious figures, intellectuals, journalists and being members of Union and Progress (CUP) movement. Such figures were Sami Frashëri who reflecting on Islam and Albanians viewed Bektashism as a milder syncretic form of Islam with Shiite and Christian influences that could overcome Albanian religious divisions through mass conversion to it. The Bektashi Sufi order during the late Ottoman period, with around 20 tekkes in Southern Albania also played a role during the Albanian National Awakening by cultivating and stimulating Albanian language and culture and was important in the construction of national Albanian ideology.

== Late Ottoman period ==
During the late Ottoman period, Muslims inhabited compactly the entire mountainous and hilly hinterland located north of the Himarë, Tepelenë, Këlcyrë and Frashëri line that encompasses most of the Vlorë, Tepelenë, Mallakastër, Skrapar, Tomorr and Dishnicë regions. There were intervening areas where Muslims lived alongside Albanian speaking Christians in mixed villages, towns and cities with either community forming a majority or minority of the population. In urban settlements Muslims were almost completely a majority in Tepelenë and Vlorë, a majority in Gjirokastër with a Christian minority, whereas Berat, Përmet and Delvinë had a Muslim majority with a large Christian minority. A Muslim population was also located in Konispol and some villages around the town. While the Ottoman administrative sancaks or districts of Korçë and Gjirokastër in 1908 contained a Muslim population that numbered 95,000 in contrast to 128,000 Orthodox inhabitants. Apart from small and spread out numbers of Muslim Romani, Muslims in these areas that eventually came to constitute contemporary southern Albania were all Albanian speaking Muslims. In southern Albania during the late Ottoman period being Albanian was increasingly associated with Islam, while from the 1880s the emerging Albanian National Movement was viewed as an obstacle to Hellenism within the region. Some Orthodox Albanians began to affiliate with the Albanian National movement causing concern for Greece and they worked together with Muslim Albanians regarding shared social and geo-political Albanian interests and aims.

In central and southern Albania, Muslim Albanian society was integrated into the Ottoman state. It was organised into a small elite class owning big feudal estates worked by a large peasant class, both Christian and Muslim though few other individuals were also employed in the military, business, as artisans and in other professions. While northern Albanian society was little integrated into the Ottoman world. Instead it was organised through a tribal structure of clans (fis) of whom many were Catholic with others being Muslim residing in mountainous terrain that Ottomans often had difficulty in maintaining authority and control. When religious conflict occurred it was between clans of opposing faiths, while within the scope of clan affiliation religious divisions were sidelined. Shkodër was inhabited by a Muslim majority with a sizable Catholic minority. In testimonies of the late Ottoman period they describe the Muslim conservatism of the Albanian population in central and northern Albania which in places such as Shkodër was expressed sometimes in the form of discrimination against Catholic Albanians. Other times Muslim and Catholic Albanians cooperated with each other for example forming the Shkodër committee during time of the League of Prizren. In matrimonial affairs during the Ottoman period it was permissible for Muslim males to marry Christian females and not vice versa. During the 19th century however, in areas of Northern Albania powerful and observant Catholics married Muslim women who converted upon marriage. Conversions to Islam from Christianity by Albanians still occurred during the early years of the 20th century.

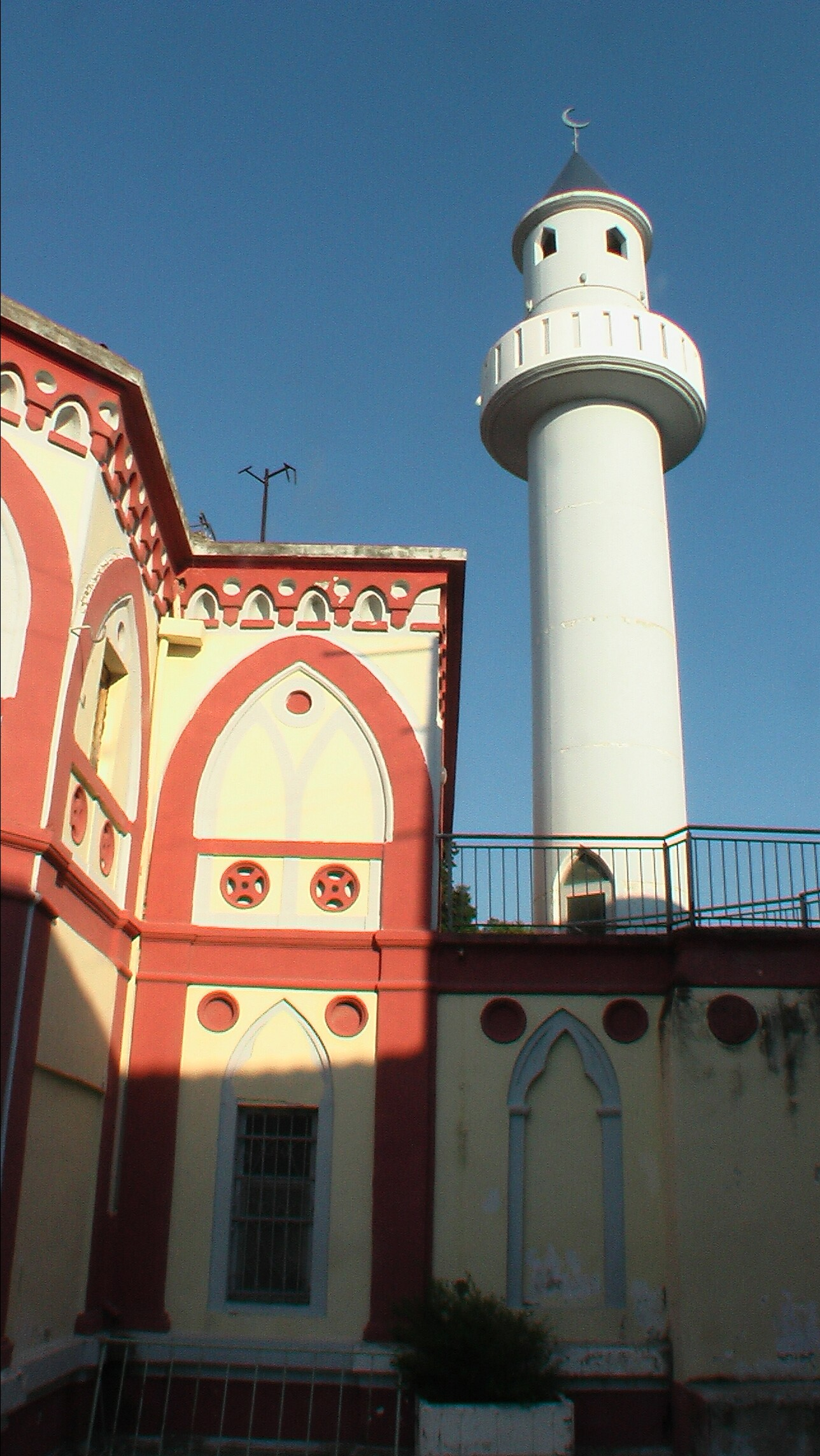
Mosque of Neshat Pasha in Vlorë.

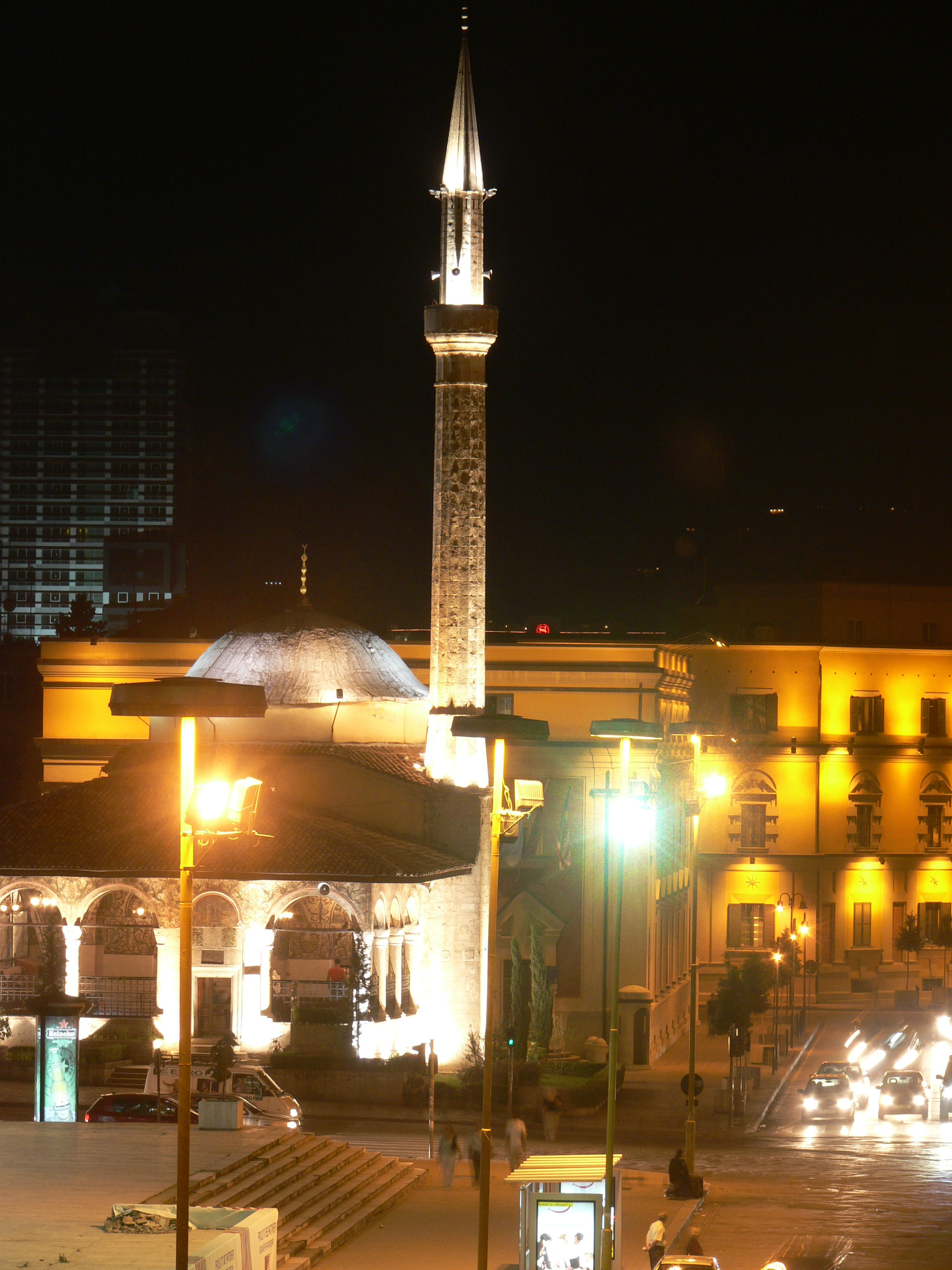
Et'hem Bey Mosque, one of the oldest mosques in Tiranë.

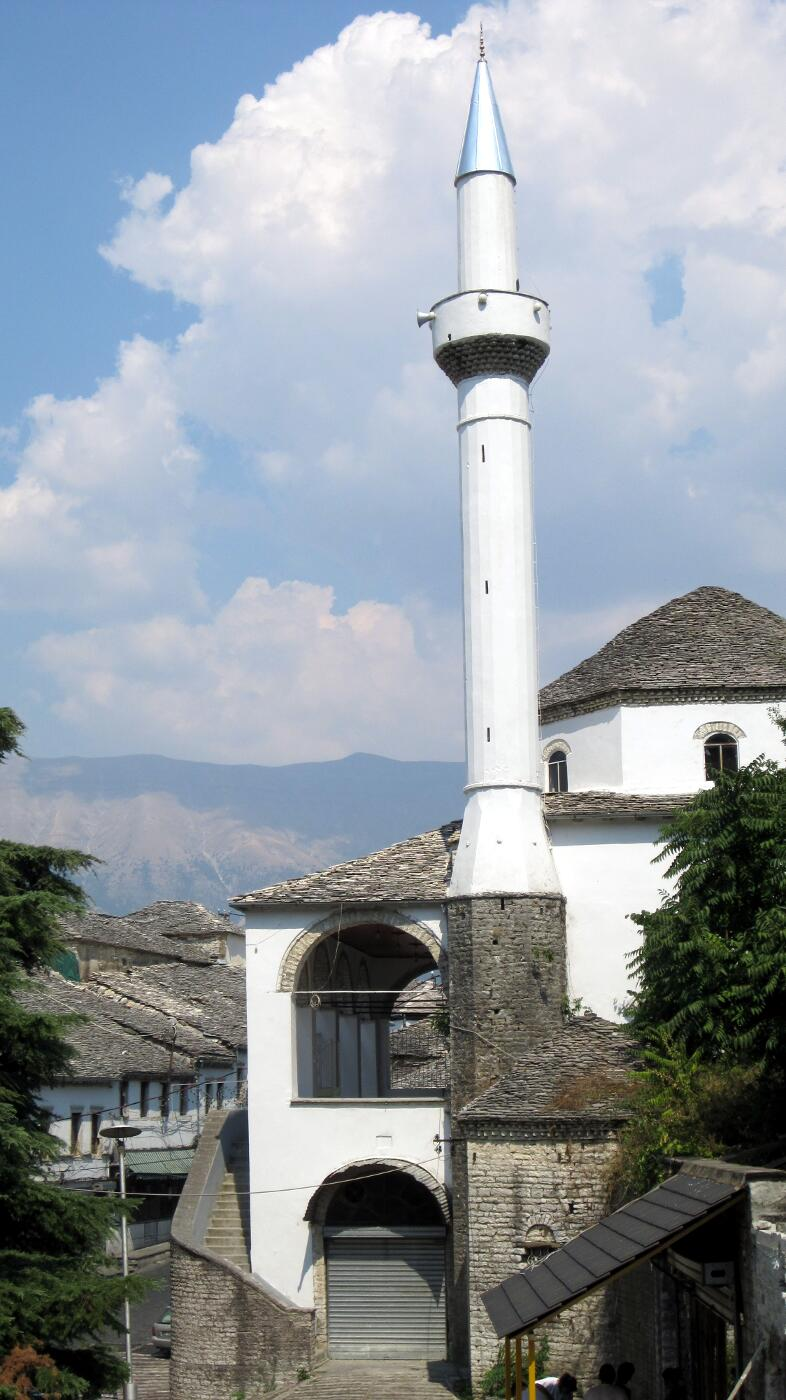
Bazaar Mosque in Gjirokastër.

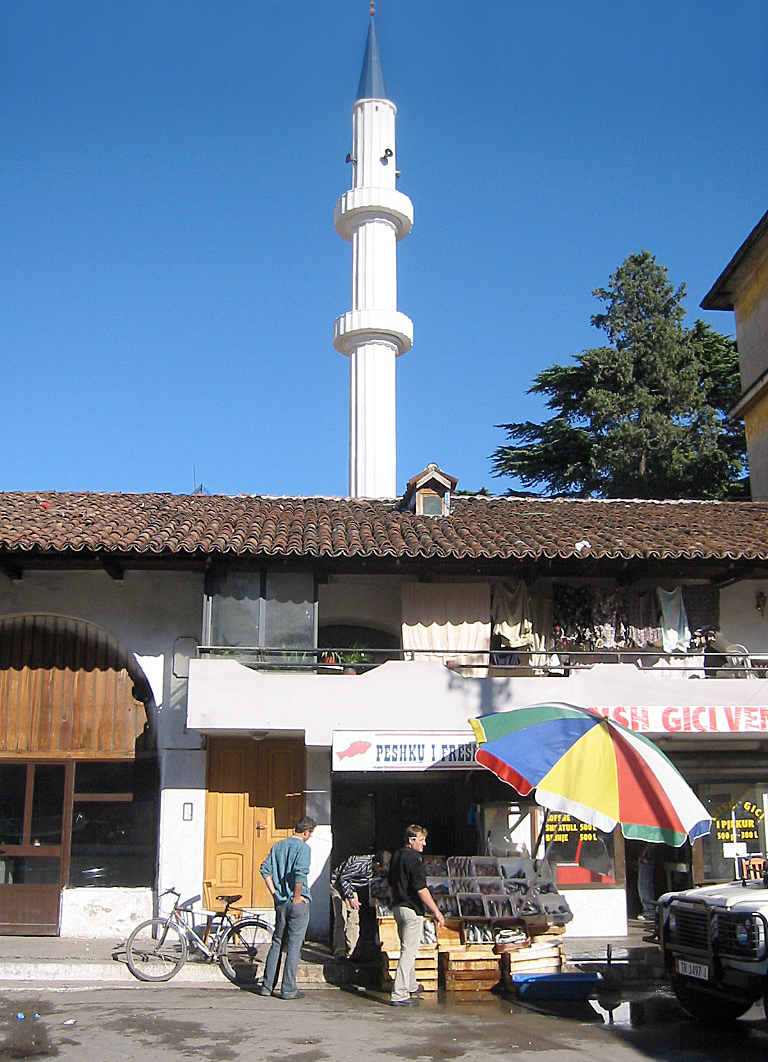
Kokonozi Mosque in Tiranë.

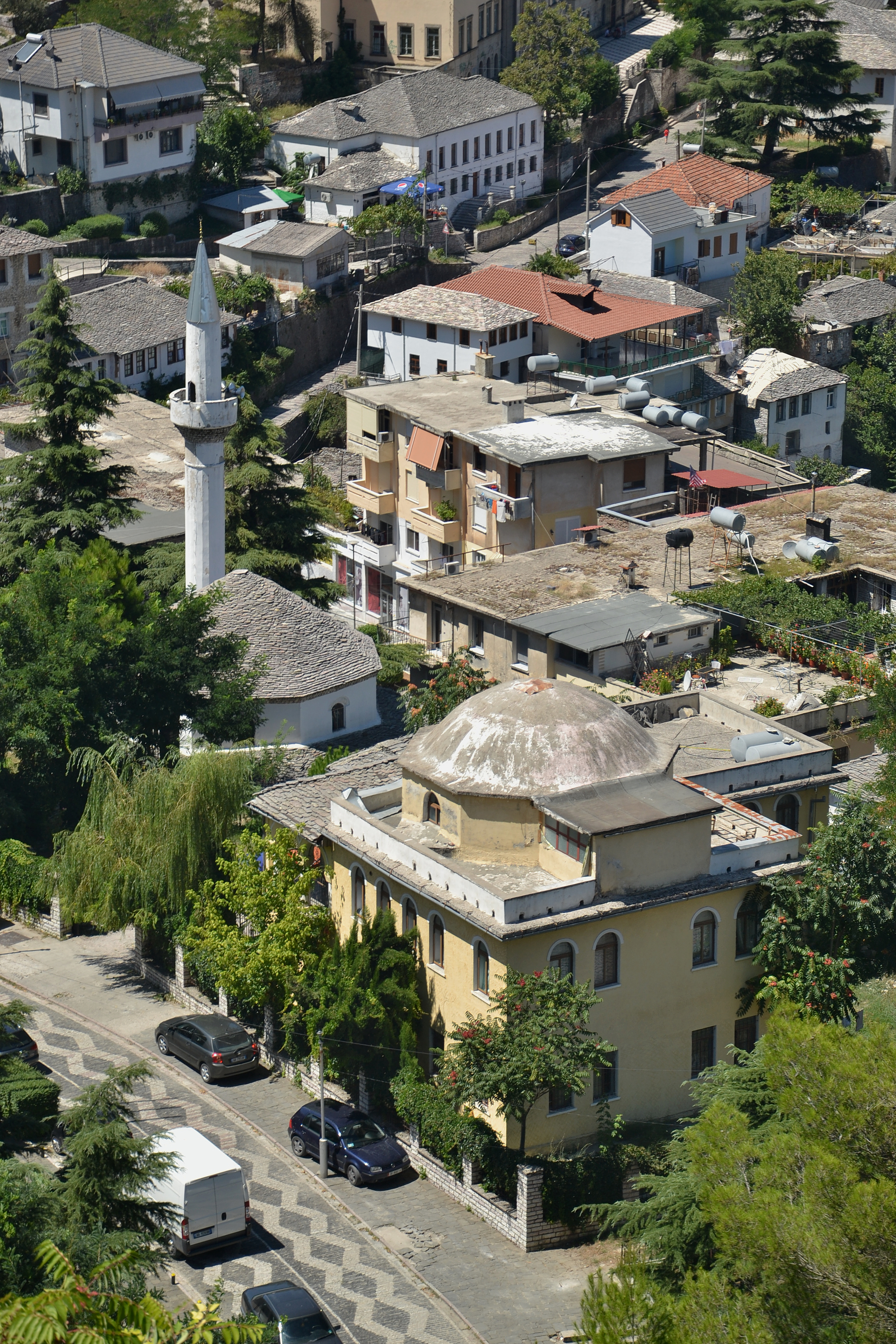
Teqe Mosque in Gjirokastër.

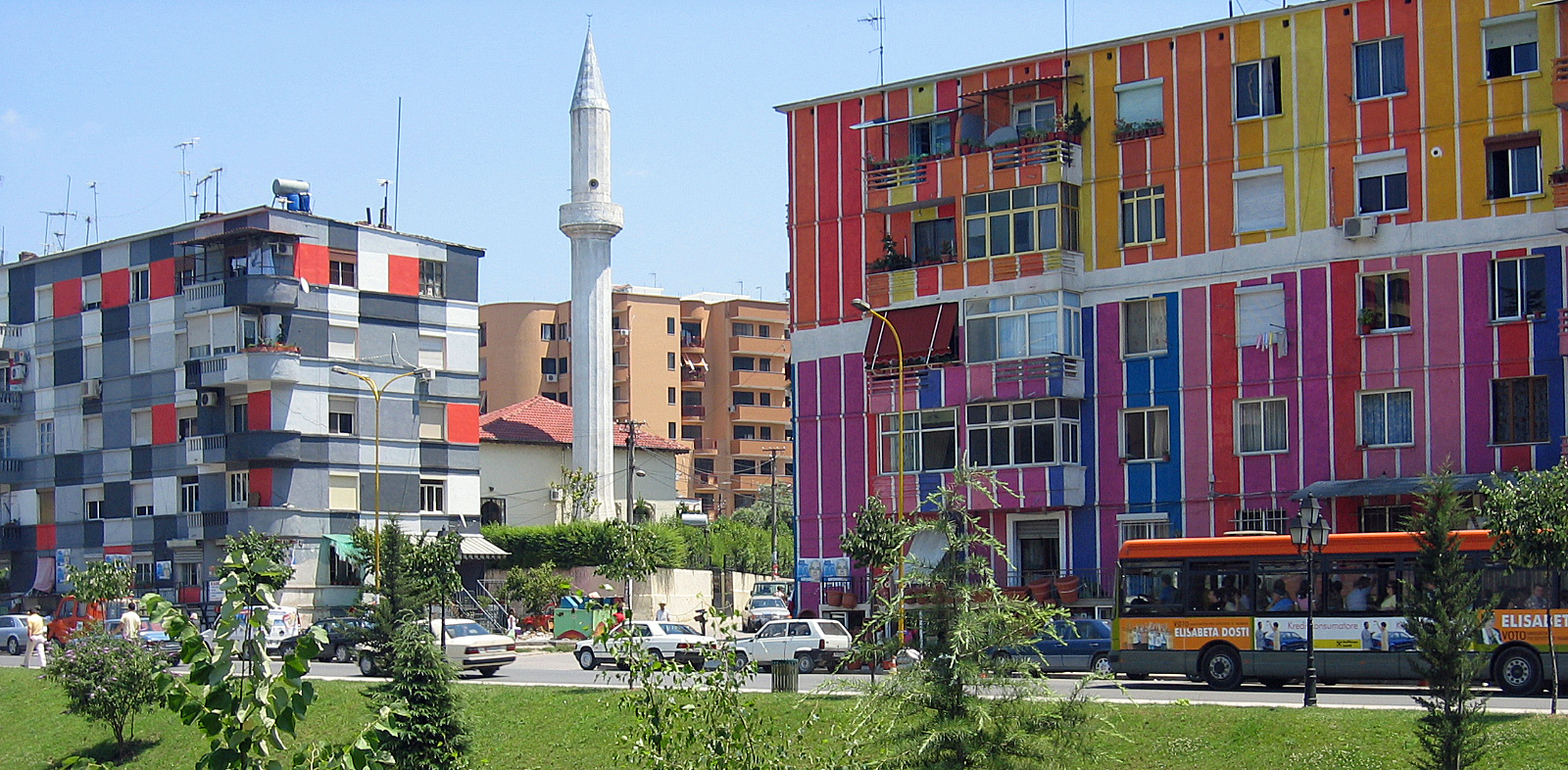
Tanners' Mosque in Tiranë.

In 1908 the Young Turk revolution, in part instigated by Muslim Albanian Ottoman officials and troops with CUP leanings deposed Sultan Abdul Hamit II and installed a new government which promised reforms. In 1908, an alphabet congress with Muslim, Catholic and Orthodox delegates in attendance agreed to adopt a Latin character-based Albanian alphabet and the move was considered an important step for Albanian unification. Opposition toward the Latin alphabet came from some Albanian Muslims and clerics who with the Ottoman government preferred an Arabic-based Albanian alphabet, due to concerns that a Latin alphabet undermined ties with the Muslim world. Due to the alphabet matter, relations between Albanian nationalists, many of whom were Muslim, and Ottoman authorities broke down. In the late Ottoman period Bektashi Muslims in Albania distanced themselves from Albanian Sunnis who opposed Albanian independence. The Ottoman government was concerned that Albanian nationalism might inspire other Muslim nationalities toward such initiatives and threaten the Muslim-based unity of the empire. Overall Albanian nationalism was a reaction to the gradual breakup of the Ottoman Empire and a response to Balkan and Christian national movements that posed a threat to an Albanian population that was mainly Muslim. Albanian nationalism was supported by many Muslim Albanians and the Ottomans adopted measures to repress it which toward the end of Ottoman rule resulted in the occurrence of two Albanian revolts. The first revolt was during 1910 in northern Albania and Kosovo reacting toward the new Ottoman government policy of centralization. The other revolt in the same areas was in 1912 that sought Albanian political and linguistic self-determination under the bounds of the Ottoman Empire and with both revolts many of the leaders and fighters were Muslim Albanians. These Albanian revolts and eventual independence (1912) were turning points that impacted the Young Turk government which increasingly moved from a policy direction of pan-Ottomanism and Islam toward a singular national Turkish outlook. With a de-emphasis of Islam, the Albanian national movement gained the strong support of two Adriatic sea powers Austria-Hungary and Italy who were concerned about pan-Slavism in the wider Balkans and Anglo-French hegemony purportedly represented through Greece in the area.

== See also ==
- Islam in Albania
  - Islam in Albania (1913-1944)
  - Islam in the People's Socialist Republic of Albania
- History of Ottoman Albania
- Albanian National Awakening
