= Elvis Naçi =

Albanian theologian and Imam (born 1977)

Personal life
- Born: 7 April 1977 (age 49) Tirana, PSR Albania
- Region: Western Balkans Southeast Europe
- Notable work: Shqiptarët për Shqiptarët
- Occupation: Theologian, Imam

Religious life
- Religion: Islam
- Jurisprudence: Hanafi

Elvis Naçi (born April 7, 1977 Tirana) is an Albanian theologian and Imam. He was the director of Islamic preaching at the Islamic Community of Albania, which operates in the Tanners' Mosque (Tabak Mosque) in Tirana and is the founder and president of the Firdeus Non-Profit Cultural Foundation.

Naçi is active on a Facebook page with over 1,400,000 follow-up subscribers (August 19, 2026) and regularly posts videos on his YouTube channel, which has more than 582,000 subscribers (August 19, 2026). Due to his great popularity among the Muslims of Albania, but also with other Albanians, he became known nationally and is regularly invited onto Albanian talk shows.

In 2019, Naçi was named Man of the Year by several Albanian magazines.

Naçi is a progressive Muslim and is a harsh critic of radical Islam in Albania. He accused the Albanian government of doing too little about radical imams. As a result, his mosque has had to engage a security service.
