= Tanners' Mosque =

Sunni mosque in Tirana City, Tirana County, Albania

- Xhamia e Tabakëve
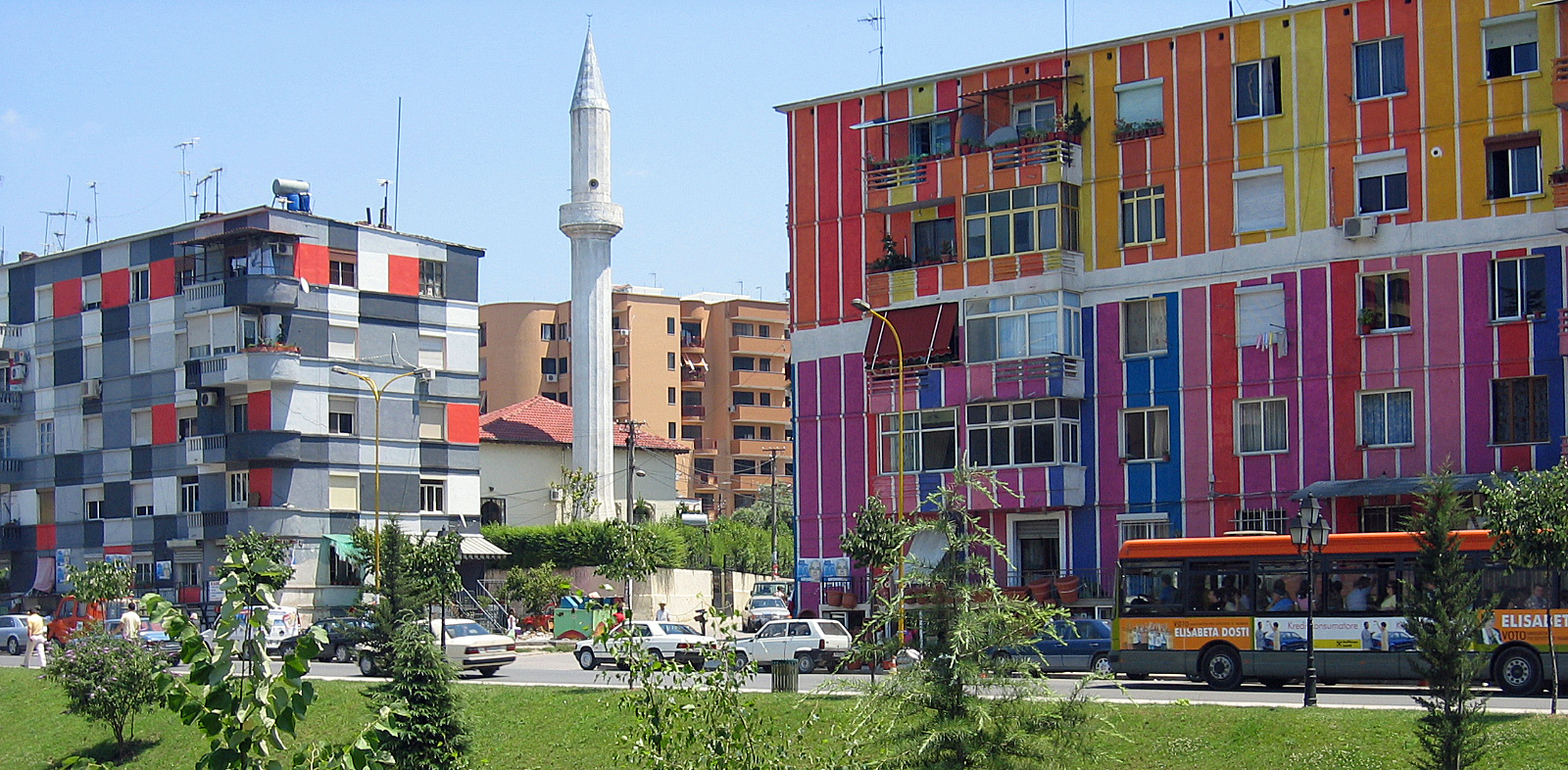
- The mosque in 2005

- Location of the mosque in Albania

Religion
- Affiliation: Sunni Islam
- Ecclesiastical or organizational status: Mosque: (17th century–1967); (since 1990– )
- Leadership: Elvis Naçi (imam)
- Status: Active

Location
- Location: Tirana City, Tirana County
- Country: Albania
- Interactive map of Tanners' Mosque
- Coordinates: 41°19′36″N 19°49′41″E

Architecture
- Type: Islamic architecture
- Completed: c. 17th – c. 18th century
- Minaret: 1

The Tanners' Mosque (Albanian: Xhamia e Tabakëve) is a Sunni mosque located near the Tanners' Bridge in Tirana, capital of Albania.

The mosque was built in the neighborhood of the handicraft-trade Tanners' guild in c. 17th – c. 18th century, during the Ottoman era. It was damaged by a lightning strike in 1927. From 1967 until 1990, the mosque was closed for worship after Albania was declared an atheist state by the Communist government of Enver Hoxha. The Resmja family made improvements on its reopening and continues to care for the mosque.

The current imam is Elvis Naçi, a theologian.

== See also ==
- Islam in Albania
  - Islam in Albania (1800–1912)
- List of mosques in Albania
