= Cultural and Ideological Revolution =

1960s comprehensive reform campaign in communist Albania

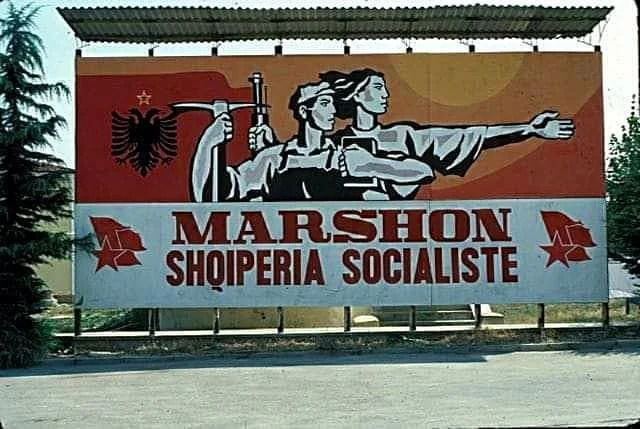
- A propaganda picture in People's Republic of Albania, late 1960s. The text says "Socialist Albania marches onwards."
- Duration: 1966 ~ 1975; Main phase: 1966 – 1969
- Location: Albania
- Motive: Stop the degradation of the economy and ideology, modernization of conservative society; destroy capitalism and revisionism
- Organized by: Party of Labour of Albania
- Outcome: Controversial

The Cultural and Ideological Revolution (Albanian: Revolucioni Ideologjik e Kulturor) was a period of political and social change in the People's Socialist Republic of Albania, launched in 1966–1967 by Enver Hoxha, the First Secretary of the Party of Labour of Albania (PPSH) at the time. The most aggressive phase of the revolution lasted from 1966 to 1969, but the campaign itself lasted even longer, until at least 1975. The authorities of the People's Socialist Republic of Albania chose to echo the Cultural Revolution in China, and were inspired by its effects. It originated through a speech held on February 6, 1967, aiming at radical changes in the military (known as the Albanian People's Army), bureaucracy and religious life. During the Cultural and Ideological Revolution, traditional kinship links in Albania, which were centered on the patriarchal family, were shaken by the postwar repression of clan leaders, collectivization of agriculture, industrialization, migration from the countryside to urban areas, and suppression of religion. It also encouraged communist students and workers to use more forceful tactics to discourage religious practices, although violence was initially condemned. Hoxha also feared the weakening of ideology and during the campaign he directed significant efforts towards the destruction of revisionism and capitalism. As a result of the Cultural and Ideological Revolution, the ruling party's influence greatly increased within Albania.

== Background ==
=== Troubles in society and economy ===
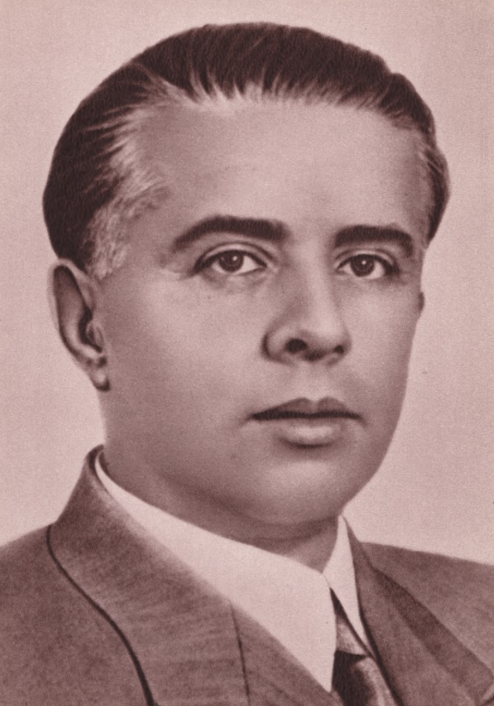
Enver Hoxha

In the mid-1960s, Albania's leaders grew wary of a threat to their power by a burgeoning bureaucracy. Party discipline had eroded. People complained about malfeasance, inflation, and low-quality goods. The end of support from the Soviet Union and the Comecon countries dealt a severe blow to the Albanian economy, which was only able to recover in 1964 with the support of China - for example, China supplied Albania with approximately 90 percent of the spare parts previously promised by the Soviet Union during the Third Five-Year Plan (1961–1965). But due to parts shortages, labor productivity fell by more than 12 percent between 1960 and 1963. The problems were so severe that in 1962 the government introduced a policy of austerity. In an attempt to develop agriculture, a new wave of peasant collectivization began, along with the expansion and qualitative improvement of arable land through terracing hillsides and draining swamps - by 1959, almost all artisans were members of cooperatives already. Despite these measures, agriculture grew by only 22 percent (despite the planned 72 percent). Industry also grew very poorly: in 1964 and 1965, it grew by only 14 percent. In general, the economic policy of the Albanian communists was aimed more at expanding production capacity than at making the most efficient use of existing capacity.

At the same time, a government program of "popular consultation" was announced, during which ordinary citizens could propose options for achieving an even greater level of autarky. The program was not as effective as planned due to years of state terror under the communist regime and, as a result, the unwillingness of citizens to take personal responsibility. In 1965–1966, the country was engulfed in protests over falling living standards.

=== Fourth Congress of the Albanian Party of Labor ===
In 1960, it was stated that Albania had managed to create the economic basis for building socialism in a short period of time and had already entered the final phase of building a socialist society. However, in fact, politics of communist Albania remained uncertain and insecure, and these factors worsened over time. On the Fourth Congress of the Albanian Party of Labor in February 1961, Enver Hoxha said:

On the basis of the magnificent successes and profound revolutionary transformations that have occurred in all countries of the world socialist system, the complete and final victory of socialism has now been assured not only in the Soviet Union, but also within the framework of the entire socialist system. The internal economic and social conditions for the restoration of capitalism have now been eliminated.

After the Fourth Congress, Hoxha strengthened Albania's ambition to become a model communist state and was convinced that he was an important ideologist of communism.

=== Fifth Congress of the Albanian Party of Labor ===
On the Fifth APL's Congress in November 1966, Hoxha was more uncertain:

As long as the complete victory of the socialist revolution in the fields of ideology and culture has not been assured, neither can there be any security or guarantee of the gains of the socialist revolution in the political and economic fields. That is why the struggle on the ideological front, for the complete destruction of the bourgeois and revisionist ideology, at bottom concerns the question: can socialism and communism be constructed and the restoration of capitalism be evaded.

Prime Minister Mehmet Shehu told the Fourth Congress, that the question "Who shall win?" between socialism and capitalism in the country has been "irrevocably resolved in favor of socialism." However, at the Fifth Congress he said that "the class struggle will continue not one or five years but throughout the entire historical epoch of the construction of socialism." Shehu also called the Cultural Revolution in China "the most important historical event of our time," and the "broadest, most profound and most gigantic revolutionary mass movement history has ever known."

=== Albanian-Soviet split and moving towards China ===
In the period between the Fourth and Fifth party congresses, Albania's relations with the Soviet Union and the Comecon countries worsened in favor of rapprochement with Maoist China and, ultimately, achieving a high degree of economic (and ideological) dependence on it - these countries became close due to the similarities in their ideology and history. Although Hoxha respected Mao Zedong and Maoism, Albanian communists never elevated Mao Zedong too highly in their propaganda and certainly did not compare him to Karl Marx and Vladimir Lenin. However, their inspiration for his Cultural Revolution was quite strong. Hoxha, an ideological Stalinist, was irritated by Khrushchev's revisionism and his de-Stalinization policies. He believed Khrushchev had betrayed Albania by leaving it alone, surrounded by a "capitalist-revisionist-fascist encirclement." At the same time, a split between China and the USSR was brewing. Albania ultimately ceased participating in Comecon in 1961.

== Introduction ==
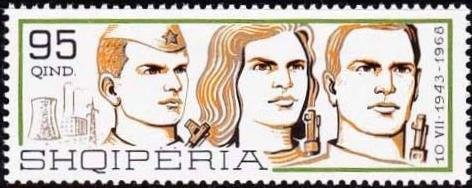
1968 stamp depicting soldier and armed civilians with cooling tower, factory and pylon.

Writers strayed from the orthodoxy of socialist realism, which demanded that art and literature serve as instruments of government and party policy. As a result, even before Mao Zedong unleashed the Cultural Revolution in China in May 1966, Hoxha launched his own Cultural and Ideological Revolution in February 1966. Hoxha's main goals were the modernization of the Albanian People's Army, public administration and the economy, formation of a new political base, and a comprehensive "revolutionization" of life in communist Albania. The government attempted to present the campaign as a continuation and deepening of the communist processes and policies that had already been underway in the country since independence.

Even before the official start of the Cultural and Ideological Revolution campaign, party officials announced the start of a government campaign to introduce Marxist–Leninist values into society: that was a preparation for a future "Revolution." The foundations of the "new communist order" had indeed already been laid, but in Hoxha's view, they had not been fully completed. He believed it was necessary to complete the formation of the Albanian nation by eliminating everything that (in his view) hindered it—religion, old traditions, and the influence of the "revisionist Soviet Union" in the army, party and society. Both the campaign and state propaganda promoted the struggle against "the three great stumbling blocks on the path of Albania's economic and social development" - struggle against bureaucracy, struggle for the full emancipation of women, and struggle against backward customs and religious beliefs. The idea was that the cultural and ideological revolution would further promote the comprehensive development of communist Albania and protect it from the revisionism of the USSR and Eastern Europe. At the Fourth Plenum of the Central Committee of the Party in 1973, Hoxha declared that it was necessary to "deepen our ideological struggle against foreign influences and liberal attitudes towards them."

== Impact on the Albanian state ==
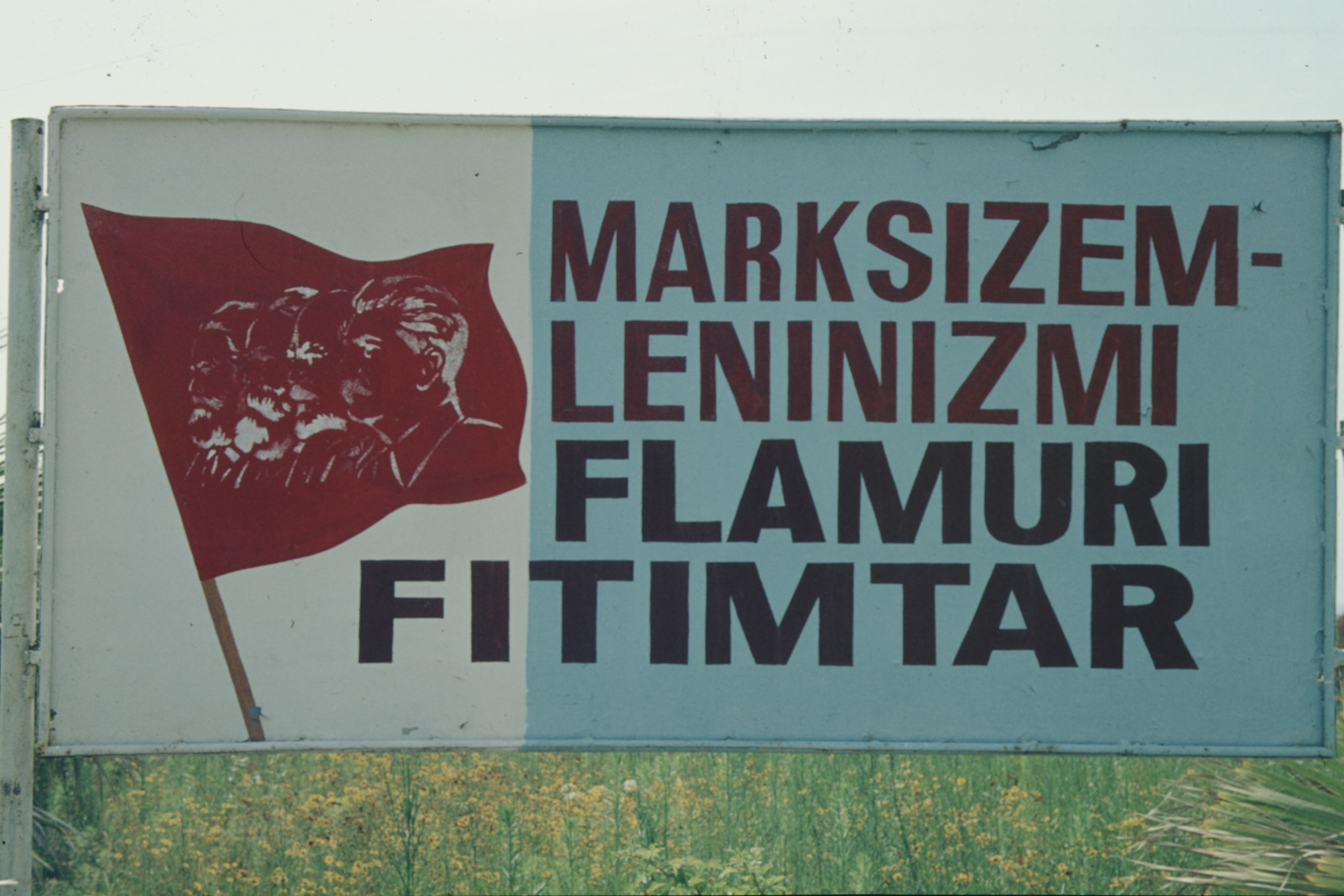
Communist agitation

Railing against a "white-collar mentality," the authorities slashed the salaries of mid- and high-level officials, ousted administrators and specialists from their desk jobs, and sent such persons to toil in the factories and fields. Six ministries, including the Ministry of Justice, were eliminated. During the campaign, there was a large-scale reduction and weakening of the bloated bureaucracy, as well as active opposition to any ambitions of civilian or military bureaucrats to exercise more power than they had already been granted. Farm collectivization even spread to the remote mountains. In addition, the government attacked dissident writers and artists, reformed its educational system, and generally reinforced Albania's isolation from European culture in an effort to keep out foreign influences. Over the course of a year, the country received only 5,000 tourists from abroad - even at the border, government officials confiscated all "Western clothing" (jeans, miniskirts, etc.) and almost all literature from them. From 1974 to 1976, a series of major political purges took place. During the campaign, travel outside Albania was almost completely banned, and a massive construction campaign began to build hundreds of thousands of bunkers across the country in case of an external invasion. Essentially, only party officials or limited sports/educational delegations had the right to travel abroad; anyone else who tried to escape could be shot by border guards or sent to prison or hard labor. The policy of autarky was justified by the historical situation of Albania, which its neighbors, such as Greece or Yugoslavia, wanted to divide/annex, and it was proved to be relatively effective, since Albania was able to build a sufficient industrial base and had enough fossil resources (including oil) to provide itself with energy.

=== Economic changes ===
In the mid-1960s, the Enver Hoxha regime finally agreed to adjust its Stalinist-style economy. In early 1966, the structure of economic planning was changed, allowing slightly greater worker participation in this process and reducing the national economic plan's targets by 80 percent. Some decentralization of economic management was introduced in relation to local branches of ministries and "people's councils," and some part of the investment funds was transferred under the control of enterprises directly. By the end of the 1960s, during the Fourth Five-Year Plan (1966–1970), despite early difficulties, the government still managed to achieve significant economic growth and many of the plan's indicators were even exceeded: for example, between 1965 and 1973, production volume in the mechanical engineering sector tripled.

Although the plan's success was significant, it was largely due to massive economic aid from China. The economy fared very well in the first two years of the Fifth Five-Year Plan (1971–1975), but afterward, China, for political reasons, significantly cut financial support to the country, and most indicators fell far short of the planned targets for the following years. Albania was forced to begin exporting goods to Western Europe, but these were noticeably inferior in quality, for which their producers received much criticism from the government in 1974.

On March 4, 1966, the party sent an "Open Letter" to the Albanian people. The letter condemned the bureaucratization of the party and the state as a whole, calling it “remnant of the past and an expression of the pressure exerted by the class enemy and his ideology on our ranks,” the excessive formality of state institutions, their isolation from the people, the intelligentsia's disdain for physical labor and its desire for personal comfort and glory. The letter called on the masses to participate in the formation of legislation, so that it would not be left to the fate of technocrats and officials who "deliberately" make it complex and incomprehensible for ordinary workers. Letter announced radical changes in the equalization of jobs and wages and in entire governance model. The state apparatus faced 15,000 job cuts, the replacement of many of its leaders, and the transfer of managers and party officials to rural areas. Income tax was abolished, and salaries for highly paid workers were reduced (only the party elite was spared from the equalization reforms): the ratio between the lowest and highest salaries became only about 1 to 2,5. The government reinstated the system, implemented since 1958, under which it again directed all workers to productive, i.e., physical labor, even high school students participated in "voluntary" construction and agricultural work. The government turned its attention back to agriculture, and in 1967, another wave of collectivization and consolidation of small farms into large state-owned enterprises began. In 1967, a new, so-called "Scientific and Technical Revolution" was launched, aimed at increasing the level of autarky in Albania. Direct taxation was abolished in 1969.

=== Electrification ===
Albania's electrification program was launched before the Cultural and Ideological Revolution, but it reached its peak during it. The plan was to achieve full electrification by 1985. However, the program's success was astounding, and the country was fully electrified by October 1970. By 1970, the entire Albanian countryside was connected to a single power grid. Thus, Albania became one of the very first (or according to other sources, the first in the world) fully electrified countries in the world, at least ahead of the rest of Europe in this indicator.

=== Purges of intelligentsia ===
Same as in China, the Albanian government showed a high degree of distrust towards the intelligentsia, considering it easily susceptible to external pressure and propaganda (despite the fact that Hoxha himself was a university graduate). In early 1966, almost at the very beginning of the campaign, the party decided to send dozens of intellectuals and writers to live permanently and do agricultural work in the countryside in order to "get closer to the masses." Later, office workers and intellectuals had to work for a month every year in agriculture or in a factory, but the campaign faced resistance. Article 55 explicitly forbade the formation of "any type of organization of a fascist, anti-democratic, religious, and anti-socialist character" and that "Fascist, anti-democratic, religious, war-mongering, and anti-socialist activities and propaganda, as well as the incitement of national and racial hatred are prohibited."

=== "Revolutionization" of literature and arts ===
According to the ruling party, literature and art were to become ideological weapons for building socialism, a theme emphasized by Albanian propaganda. The party considered this the primary path to creating a "new communist man" who would put collective interests above all else. State propaganda made every effort to form a “correct,” party-oriented form of art and literature. This was a period of active promotion by the party of the so-called folklore of the working class. which represented the ideals and principles of socialist realism.

Classic Albanian literature, written by authors previously praised by Albanian leaders for their proletarian orientation and support for social justice, also fell under disgrace. In 1973, already at the fifth plenum of the Central Committee of the Party, party officials condemned many artists for their disputing the socialist state and spreading harmful liberal views and Western influence - some of them were imprisoned, and others were sent to hard labor.

During this period, a major resonance in Albanian art criticism also occurred: Enver Hoxha sent a letter to the so-called "Monumental Trio" (three Albanian sculptors, Kristaq Rama, Shaban Hadëri, and Muntaz Dhrami), who were then working on the enormous Independence Monument (from the Ottoman Empire), in which he asked them to confirm the monument's connection with the "socialist present," so that it would not simply be a historical work.

=== "Revolutionization" of education ===
Along with art and literature, the Albanian education system, another important goal of the cultural and ideological revolution, was also “revolutionized.” The party placed a significant emphasis on this aspect of the campaign, as it understood the role education could play in shaping the necessary mindset in students and turning them into "reliable revolutionaries." In November 1966, at the Fifth Party's Congress, Hoxha said the following:

Our great objectives in the realm of the cultural and ideological revolution for the education of communists and all the working people in a high revolutionary spirit can not be achieved without further improving the entire content of our educational work and especially the method and style of this work.

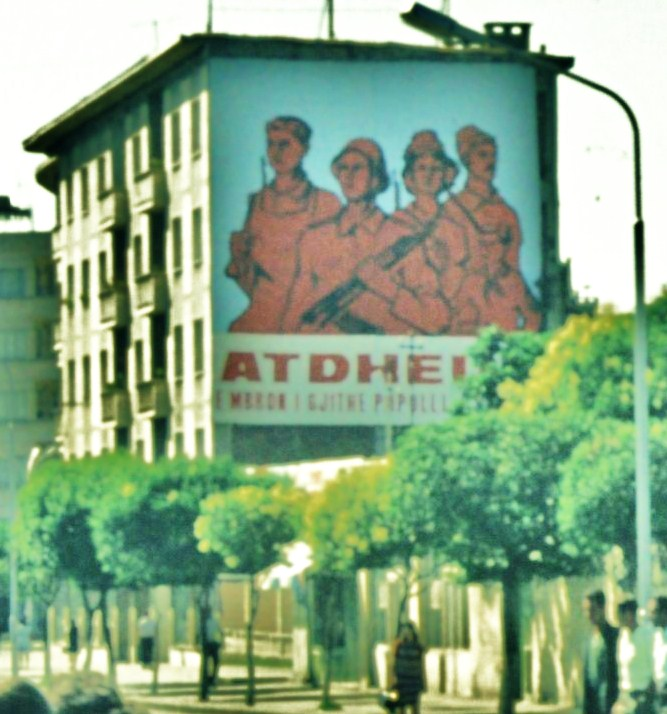
Military fresco, 1978

The government introduced a new program of part-time work and part-time study for its students to bridge the gap between theory and practice among Albanian youth. In the spring of 1967, another campaign aimed at education was initiated - during its course, a partial rejection of the strictly Soviet educational system adopted by Albania earlier took place, and at the call of the party, mass destruction of all school textbooks containing idealistic and theological theories took place. At the same time, despite all such ideological campaigns, the Albanian education system continued to function normally. In December 1969, a new education reform program was adopted with the goal of more effective ideological indoctrination of students. Three main components of the new education system were identified: academic education itself, productive labor, and physical military training for young people. In schools, "collective cultivations" were expanded and propaganda of the personality cult of Hoxha was intensified. As Hoxha said once: "In our country, the cultural revolution is being successfully developed side by side with the great work of laying the foundations of socialism. The development of our people’s education occupies an important place within the framework of this revolution."

=== Reform campaign in the army ===
At the 16th Plenum of the Central Committee of the Albanian Party of Labor in March 1966, measures were taken to seriously reform the Albanian People's Army, which included the abolition of military ranks and the reassignment of political commissars in military units. The idea for the abolition of ranks in the army was again put forward in April 1966, with the Open Letter that the Political Bureau of the Central Committee of the PPSH sent to communist organizations. The open letter provided arguments as to why this reform should take place and, among the main ones were the lack of ranks in the Albanian Liberation Army. The regime eventually did abolished military ranks, reintroduced political commissars into the military, and renounced professionalism in the army. When the Chinese in the 1980s restored the ranks, the Albanian army did not introduce them, with Enver Hoxha describing them as: "Generals with lousy breasts from decorations". The army has officially adopted the Maoist military strategy of "People's war." The Albanian People's Army and youth sang the praises of Hoxha.

== Impact on women ==
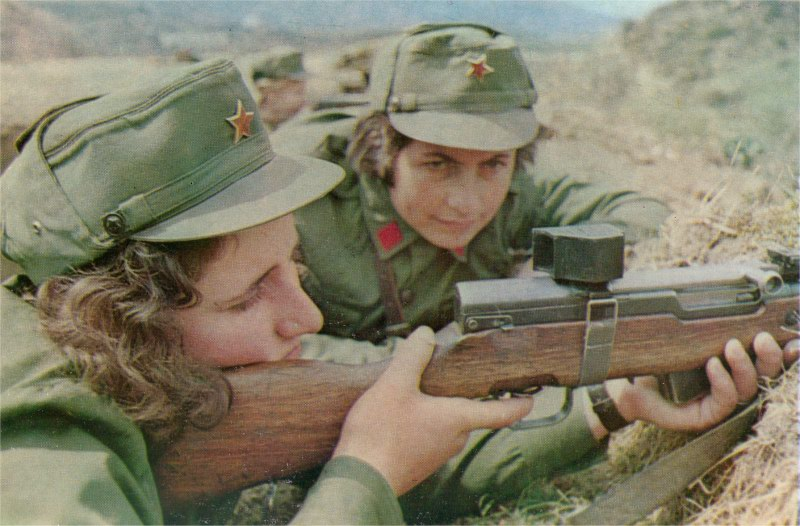
Women serving in the army

In 1967, Enver Hoxha said:

The entire party and country should hurl into the fire and break the neck of anyone who dared trample underfoot the sacred edict of the party on the defense of women's rights.

The postwar regime brought a radical change in the status of Albania's women. Considered second-class citizens in traditional Albanian society, women did most of the work at home and they also did most of the work in the fields. Improving the position of women in society was a major achievement of Enver Hoxha.

=== Women's employment ===
During the Cultural and Ideological Revolution, the party encouraged women to take jobs outside the home in an effort to compensate for labor shortages and overcome their conservatism. The campaign resulted in women making up over 40 percent of the members of the People's Councils and over 30 percent of the members of the People's Assembly, with two even serving on the party's central committee.

=== Fighting female illiteracy ===
Before World War II, about 90% of Albania's women were illiterate, and in many areas, they were regarded as chattel under ancient tribal laws and customs. By 1978, the number of women studying in secondary schools had increased 175-fold compared to the same figure in 1938, and the number of women in eight-year schools had increased 15-fold. The number of women studying in higher education institutions increased 101-fold by 1978 compared to 1957. At the borders, female border guards could be seen with weapons and in uniform.

== Impact on religion ==
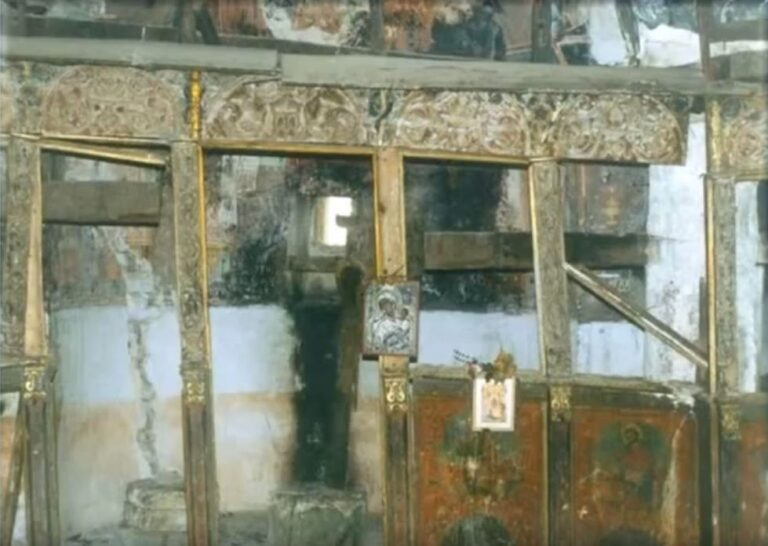
Destroyed church

During the revolution, the Party began to promote secularism in place of Abrahamic religions, namely Islam. However, after the Fifth Congress of the Party of Labor of Albania and Enver Hoxha's speech on 6 February 1967, the authorities launched a violent campaign to extinguish religious life in Albania, claiming that religion had divided the Albanian nation and kept it mired in backwardness. In his 1967 speech, Hoxha called on the people to unite in their fight against religion and declares that the only religion in Albania is "Albanism". He called on young people to participate in the closure of churches and mosques throughout Albania. Hoxha saw religion not only as a relic of the past, but also as an object of division in society and a dangerous analogue of party activity. In 1968, Hoxha stated in a speech in that "Religion is a fuel kindling fires of all evils".

=== Decrees No. 4236 and No. 4337 ===
In April 1967, the government passed Decree No. 4236, which allowed regional committees and cooperatives to seize any property used for religious activities without paying any compensation. On November 22, 1967, Decree No. 4337 was issued, which cancelled all previous decrees that declared support for "secularism" and replaced them with a complete ban on any form of religion.

=== Closure of religious institutions ===
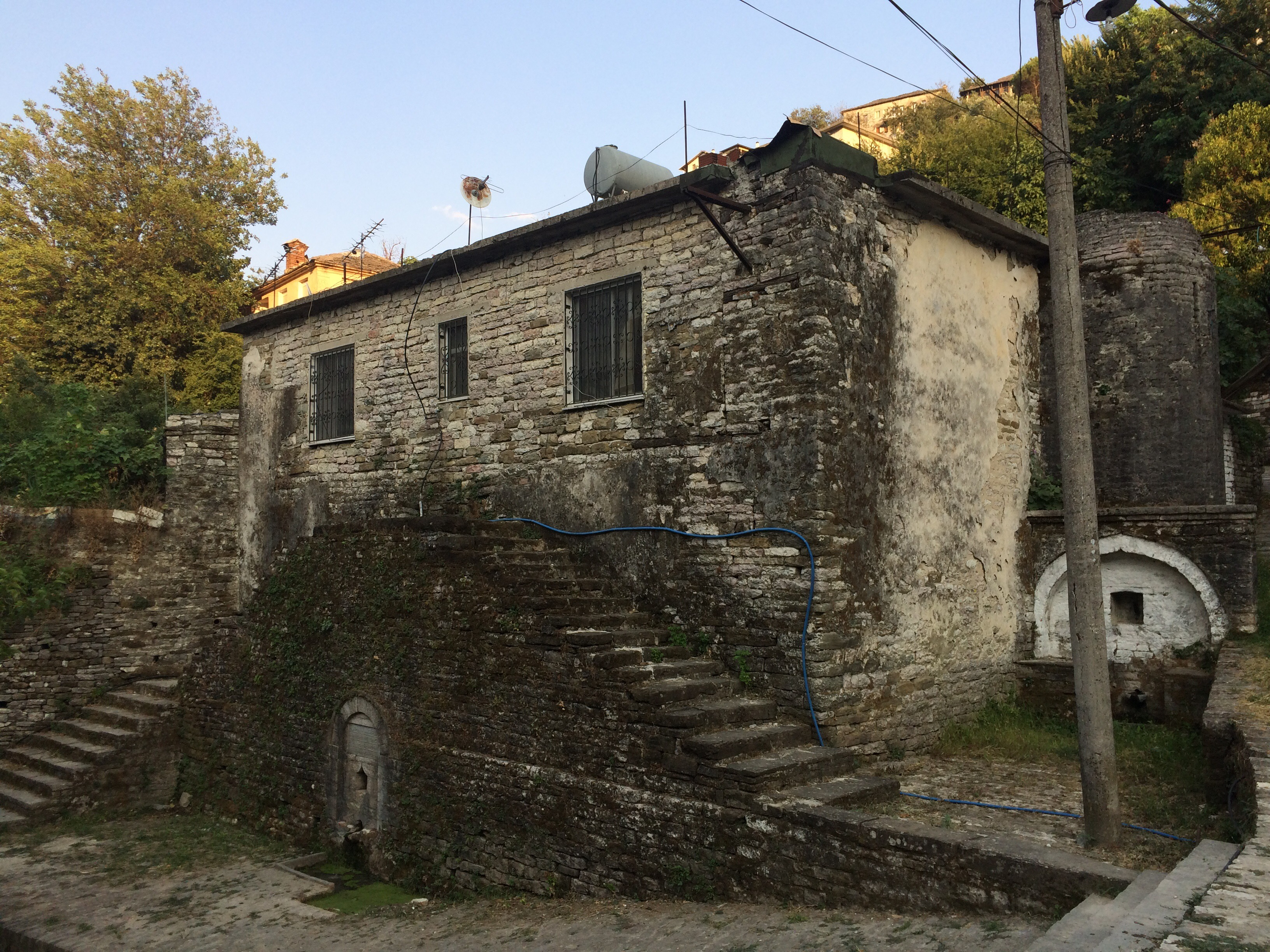
The historic 17th-century Mexhide Mosque in Gjirokastra destroyed and with its minaret torn down has been turned into a residential building

Student agitators combed the countryside, forcing Albanians to quit practicing their faiths. Despite complaints, even by APL members, all churches, mosques, monasteries, and other religious institutions (around 2,169) were closed or converted into warehouses, gymnasiums, and workshops already by May 1967. However, in rare cases, ancient buildings were preserved because they "had cultural and historical significance." Orthodox icons were used as firewood. A special decree abrogated the charters by which the country's main religious communities had operated. While the Albanian Constitution had formally guaranteed freedom of religion to the Albanian people right up until that time, religious freedom was virtually non-existent after 1967. The new constitution of 1976 (article 37) officially declared: "the state recognizes no religion whatever and supports atheist propaganda for the purpose of inculcating the scientific materialist world outlook in people". The campaign culminated in an announcement that Albania had become the world's first atheistic state, a feat which was trumpeted as one of Enver Hoxha's greatest achievements.

=== Persecution of the clergy and rename of locations ===
The clergy were declared "social parasites." The religious representatives were imprisoned or sent to work in rural areas or factories, or sometimes even shot. Town and city names which echoed Abrahamic religious themes were abandoned for neutral secular ones (Decree No. 225 of 1975 officially mandated that all religious place names be changed to non-religious ones), as well as personal names. It was officially allowed to choose from about 3,000 names listed in the "Dictionary of People's Names." In addition to this, representatives of religions were forced to attend special re-education classes created specifically for them. In the summer of 1967, all public religious performances and ceremonies were officially banned in Albania, and the operation of any religious institutions was also prohibited. This caused discontent among the older population, but nothing could be done about it. A "Museum of Atheism" has also opened in the city of Shkodër.

== Comparison with the Cultural Revolution in China ==
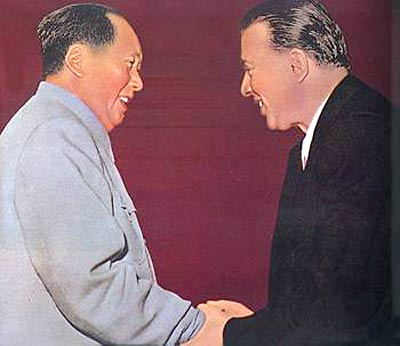
Mao and Hoxha in 1956

Despite some parallels, differences between the Albanian and Chinese Cultural Revolutions remained: for example, unlike the Chinese Communist Party, the Albanian Party of Labor remained a unified and centralized political structure under the leadership of Hoxha and his closest allies, who did not face political purges like their Chinese comrades. The Albanian People's Army also remained on the sidelines of the campaign, although the Chinese People's Liberation Army became its catalyst. In addition, the Albanian revolution was less aggressive and emotional than the Chinese one, and some aspects of the Chinese Cultural Revolution have no analogues in Albania. But the Cultural and Ideological Revolution many times was called a campaign in solidarity with the Maoist Cultural Revolution, despite it having big differences.

== Legacy ==
In 2019, journalist Luljeta Progni in collaboration with the "Kujto" Foundation, as part of a series of documentaries concerning the legacies of Albanian communism, aired on News24 television the documentary "Stones of Faith" that deals with the Cultural Revolution.

== Other names ==
Cultural and Ideological Revolution sometimes also called Cultural Revolution (Albanian: Revolucioni Kulturor), Uninterrupted Revolution (Albanian: Revolucion i Pandërprerë), Revolutionization (Albanian: Revolucionarizim) or Permanent Cultural and Ideological Revolution (Albanian: Revolucioni i Përhershëm Kulturor dhe Ideologjik).

== See also ==
- Islam in the People's Socialist Republic of Albania
- List of cultural, intellectual, philosophical and technological revolutions
- Cultural Revolution in the Soviet Union
- Hoxhaism
