= Kubelie Mosque =

Mosque in Kavajë, Albania

- Xhamia e Kubelies
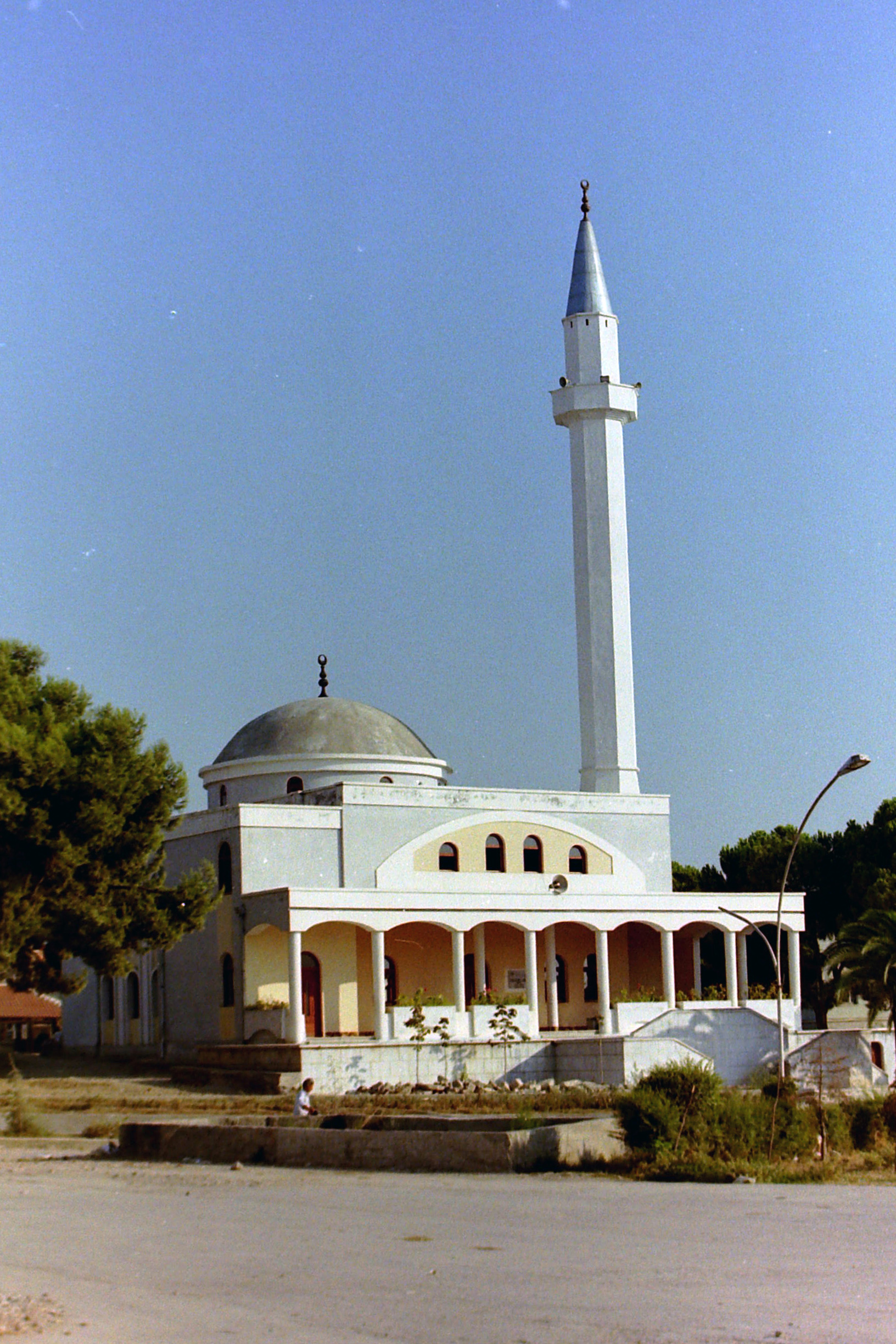
- The mosque in 1995

- Location of the mosque in Albania

Religion
- Affiliation: Islam
- Ecclesiastical or organisational status: Mosque
- Status: Active

Location
- Location: Kavajë
- Country: Albania
- Interactive map of Kubelie Mosque
- Coordinates: 41°11′02″N 19°33′44″E

Architecture
- Type: Islamic architecture
- Style: Ottoman

Specifications
- Dome: 1
- Minaret: 1

The Kubelie Mosque, also known as the Kapllan Beu Mosque (Albanian: Xhamia e Kubelies), is a mosque in Kavajë, Albania. The Old Mosque (Xhamija e Vjetër) was built in 1735 CE under the Ottomans by Kapllan Beu. This original mosque stood on the main street of the city, about 70 metres (230 ft) to the east of the current mosque.

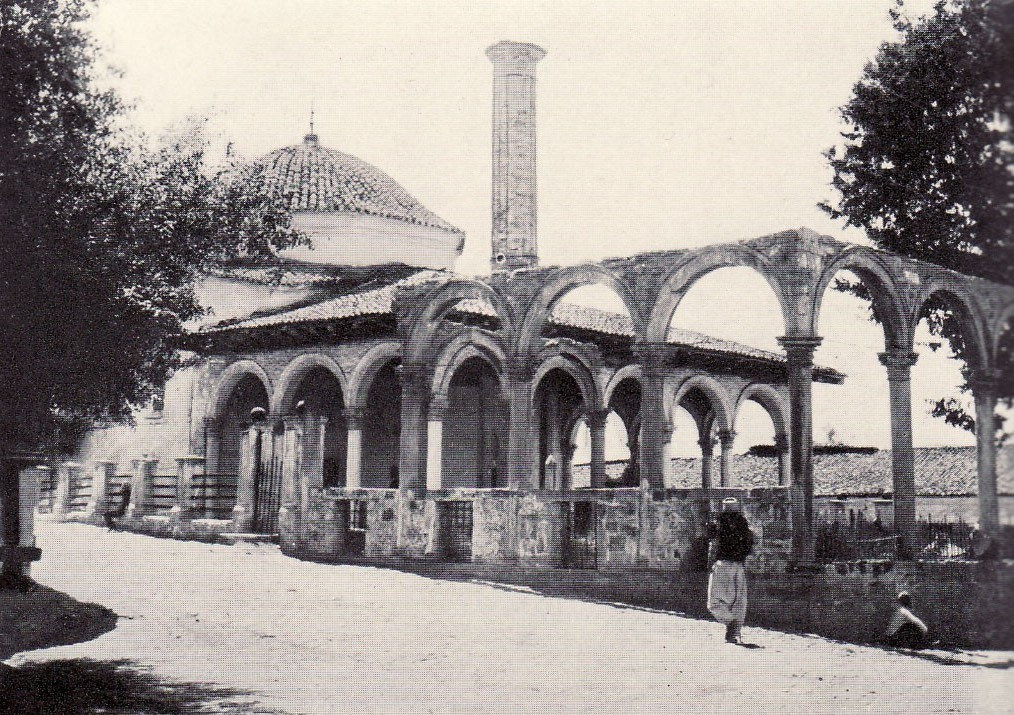
Old Kubelie mosque

Also named after its founder Kapllan Pasha, the Kubelie mosque had been described as a "grand, beautiful building, with a dome and a peristyle. Marble facades rise under the cypress trees with their Byzantine columns and their Arabian arches." After being destroyed by the Communist dictatorship in the 1970s, the newly built mosque has a very simple and modernist style, is made of concrete and is completely painted with white color while the original mosque was a traditional Ottoman stone building with beautifully coloured decorations on the inside and a clay tile roof.

== See also ==
- Islam in Albania
- List of mosques in Albania
