= Islam in Albania (1913–1944) =

Islam in Albania (1913–1944) was characterised by an increasing secularisation of Albanian society which had begun with Albanian Independence in 1912 carrying on influences from the Albanian National Awakening. During the interwar period, new local Muslim institutions such as the Muslim Community of Albania arose that severed ties with the Ottoman Caliphate and placed a focus on localising Islam in Albania. The Albanian state also played a significant role in that process through state interference and pressuring the uptake of reforms by those institutions and wider Muslim society. Measures that were adopted were banning the veil and others which were interpreted as modernising Albania. These events caused tensions within parts of Muslim society between conservatives and those who viewed themselves as progressives which caused discussions and reflections about the future role of Islam in Albania and Albanian identity. The interwar era also saw Sufi Islam expand in Albania with various orders gaining new adherents with the largest, the Bektashi Order moving its world headquarters to Albania.

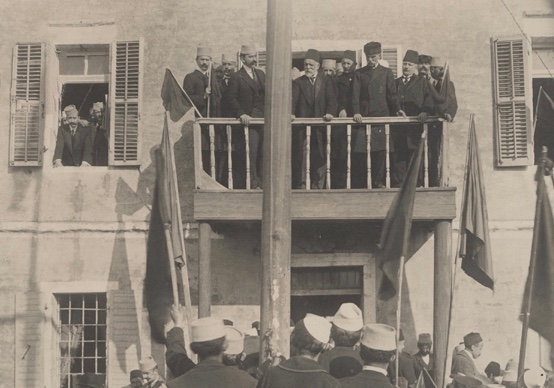
Ismail Kemal with Muslom clerics on the first anniversary of the session of the Assembly of Vlorë which proclaimed the independence of Albania.

== Balkan Wars and Independence (1912–1913) ==
On the eve of the Balkan Wars and due to the Albanian revolts of 1908 and 1912, the Ottomans were unsure about whether Muslim Albanians would defend the sovereignty of the state if war with its Orthodox Balkan neighbours broke out. In October 1912, with Bulgarian, Montenegrin, Serbian and Greek armies commencing hostilities with the Ottomans and entering areas populated by Muslim Albanians, apart from some desertions due to military setbacks, they sided with the Ottomans and mainly fought well. Realising that the collapse of Ottoman rule through military defeat in the Balkans was imminent, Albanians represented by Ismail Kemal, a Bektashi Shia Muslim, declared Independence from the Ottoman Empire on 28 November 1912 in Vlorë. The main motivation for independence was to prevent Balkan Albanian inhabited lands from being annexed by Greece and Serbia, while the Ottoman CUP Young Turk government felt betrayed by these actions as it considered Albanians a kindred Muslim people. Of the Great Powers, Italy and Austria-Hungary supported Albanian independence due to concerns that Serbia with an Albanian coast would be a rival power in the Adriatic Sea and open to influence from its ally Russia.

Apart from geo-political interests, some Great powers were reluctant to include more Ottoman Balkan Albanian inhabited lands into Albania due to concerns that it would be the only Muslim dominated state in Europe. Russo-French proposals were for a truncated Albania based on central Albania with a mainly Muslim population, which was also supported by Serbia and Greece who considered that only Muslims could be Albanians. Within the scope of the Balkan Wars (1912–13) the Northern Epirote movement arose in southern Albania amongst the Orthodox population calling for unification with Greece who also opposed living in an Albania under leaders composed of Muslim Albanians. Fighting broke out in southern Albania between Greek irregulars and Muslim Albanians who opposed the Northern Epirot movement. Between 1912–13 and 1916 some areas of southern Albania were temporarily under Greek military administration and Muslims in those areas were subject to Greek law. For example, in 1913 the Greek administration appointed muftis in the settlements of Përmet, Libohovë, Gjirokastër, Delvinë, Leskovik, Frashër and Tepelenë and all received government salaries.

== World War One (1914–1918) ==
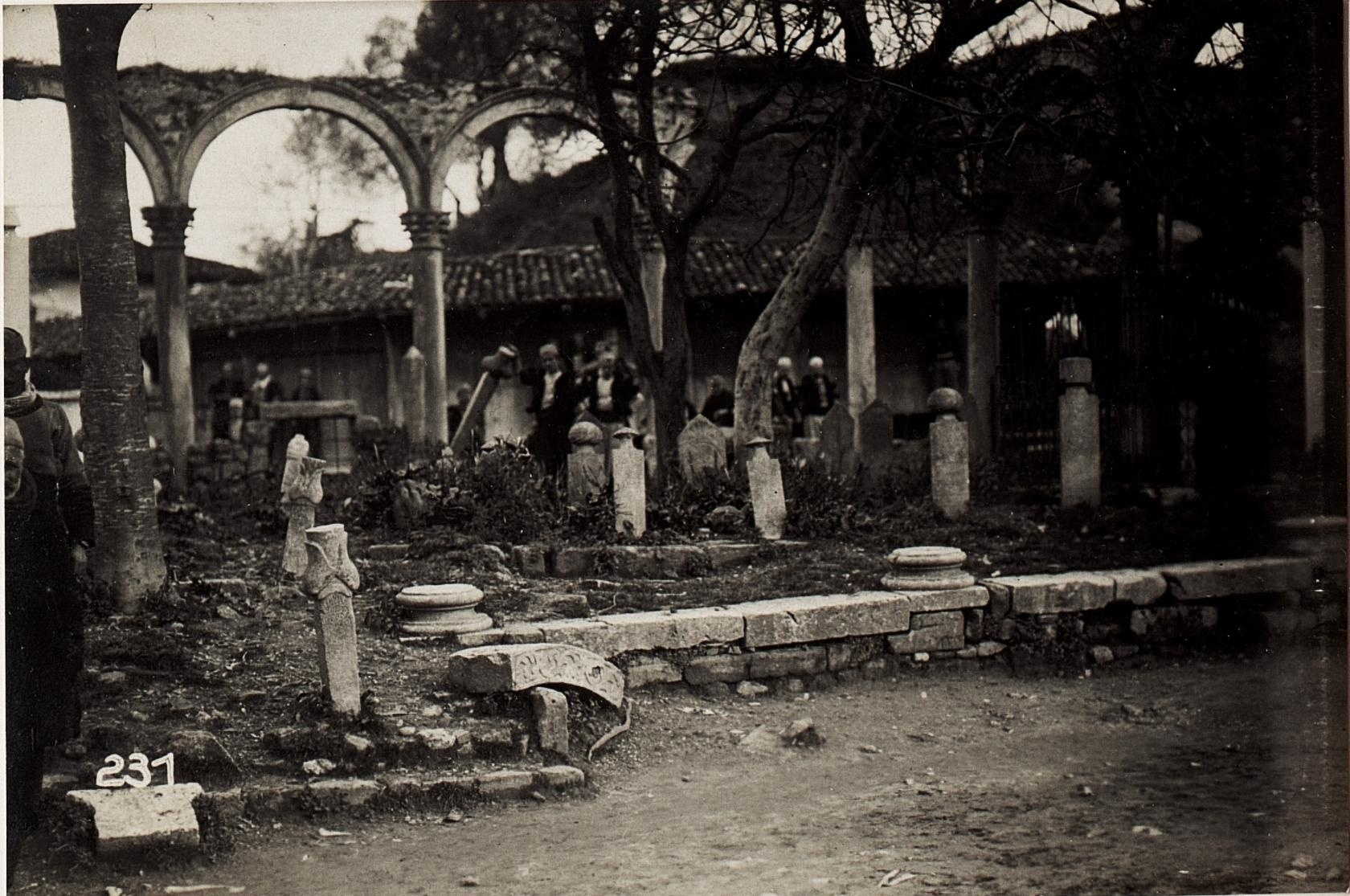
Muslim cemetery in Kavaja (around the Kubelie Mosque in 1917)

After recognising Albanian independence and its provisional borders in 1913, the Great powers imposed on Albania a Christian German prince Wilhelm of Wied to be its ruler in 1914. In the ensuring power struggles and disquiet over having a Christian monarch, a failed Muslim uprising (1914) broke out in central Albania that sought to restore Ottoman rule while northern and southern Albania distanced themselves from those events. During World War one, northern, central and south-central Albania came under Austro-Hungarian occupation. In the census of 1916–18 conducted by Austro-Hungarian authorities, the results showed that Muslims in the regions of Dibër, Lumë and Gorë were over 80% of the population. In the western part of the mountainous areas, Shkodër and in the mountains east of the lake were areas that contained a large Muslim population. In central Albania, the area from the Mat region to the Shkumbini river mouth toward Kavajë encompassing the districts of Tirana, Peqin, Kavajë and Elbasan the population was mainly Muslim. In the area of Berat Muslims were a majority population with an Orthodox minority, while south of Elbasan Muslims were a plurality alongside a significant Orthodox population. In the region of Gramsh, Muslims were a majority except for two people and in the southern Peqin area only Muslims were present. Muslims also were a majority population in the Mallakastër region alongside a small Orthodox minority. The experience of World War One, concerns over being partitioned and loss of power made the Muslim Albanian population support Albanian nationalism and the territorial integrity of Albania. An understanding emerged between most Sunni and Bektashi Albanians that religious differences needed to be sidelined for national cohesiveness. Whereas an abandonment of pan-Muslim links abroad was viewed in the context of securing support internationally for and maintaining independence with some Muslim Albanian clergy being against disavowing ties with the wider Muslim world.

== Interwar period (1919–1939) ==
From the early days of interwar Albania and due to Albania's heterogeneous religious makeup, Albania's political leadership defined Albania as without an official religion. Muslim Albanians at that time formed around 70% of the total population of 800,000 and Albania was the only Muslim country in Europe. In the former Ottoman districts of Korçë and Gjirokastër forming southern Albania, the share of the Muslim population increased in 1923 to 109,000 in contrast to 114,000 Orthodox and by 1927 Muslims were 116,000 to 112,000 Orthodox. Yugoslavia and Greece in their state policies of the 1920s claimed that Albania was a little Turkey hostile to Orthodox populations like Greeks and others and that the Muslim majority was persecuting them. Albania refuted those claims of sectarian Muslim and Christian conflict and attributed tensions in its south to the movement for an independent Albanian Orthodox church and those wanting to remain under the Patriarchate. Orthodox Albanians undertook to implement many government reforms due to their previous Ottoman status of being an underclass by desiring to move Albania away from its Muslim Ottoman heritage.

=== Break with Ottoman Caliphate and beginning of reforms ===
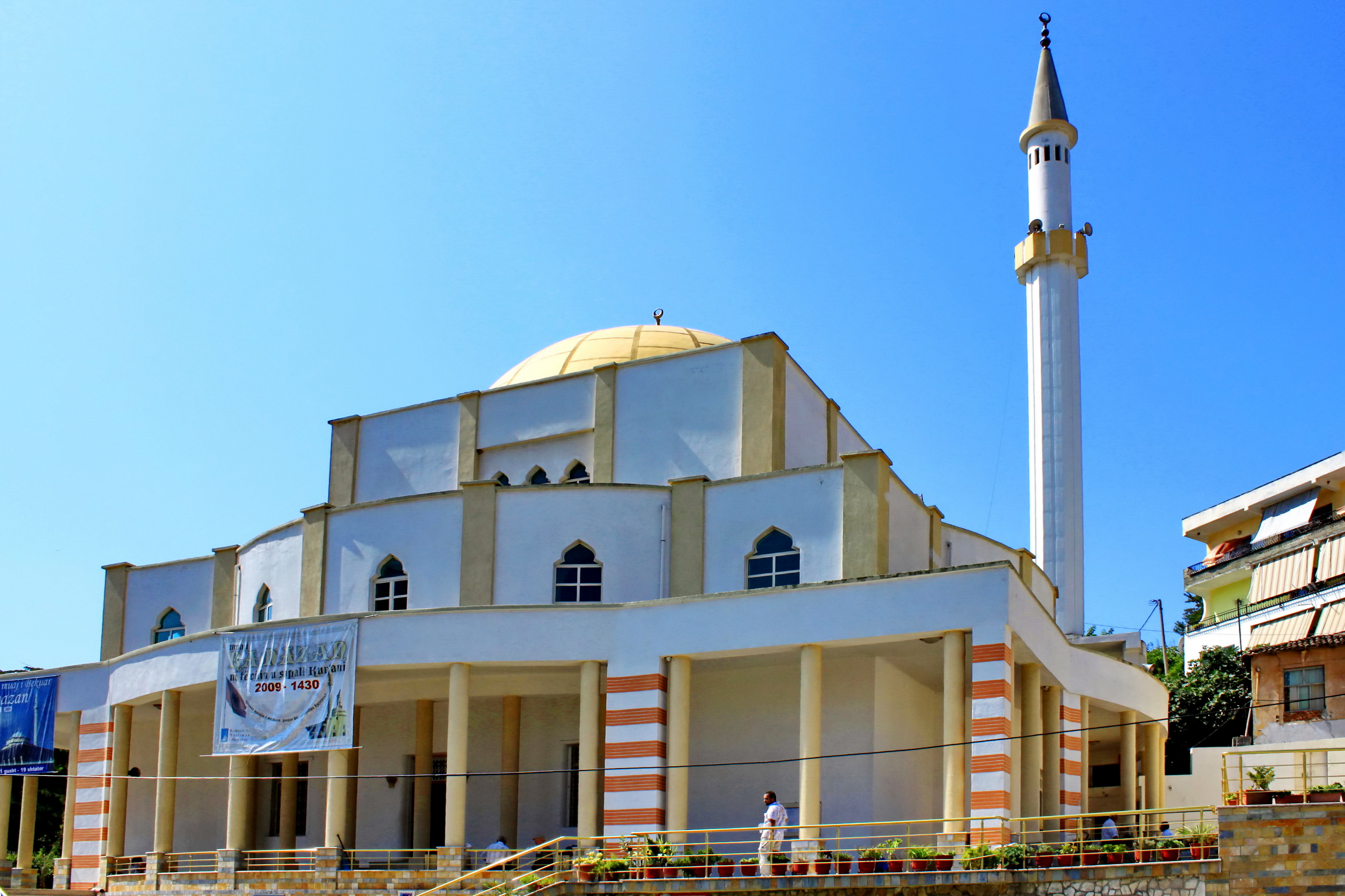
Great Mosque of Durrës, (built 1931).

From 1920 until 1925 a four-member governing regency council from the four religious denominations (Sunni, Bektashi, Catholic, Orthodox) was appointed. Albanian secularist elites pushed for a reform of Islam as the process of Islamic religious institutions were nationalised and the state increasingly imposed its will upon them. At the first Islamic National Congress (1923) the criteria for delegates attending was that being a cleric was unimportant and instead patriots with a liberal outlook were favoured alongside some delegates being selected by the state. Government representatives were present at the congress. Following the government program of reforms, the Albanian Islamic congress in Tirana decided to deliberate and reform some Islamic traditional practices adopted from the Ottoman period with the reasoning of allowing Albanian society the opportunity to thrive. The measures adopted by the congress was a break with the Ottoman Caliphate and to establish local Muslim structures loyal to Albania, banning polygamy (most of the Muslim Albanian population was monogamous) and the mandatory wearing of veil (hijab) by women in public. A new form of prayer was also implemented (standing, instead of the traditional salat ritual). As with the congress, the attitudes of Muslim clerics were during the interwar period monitored by the state who at times appointed and dismissed them at will.

=== State interference, reforms and tensions ===
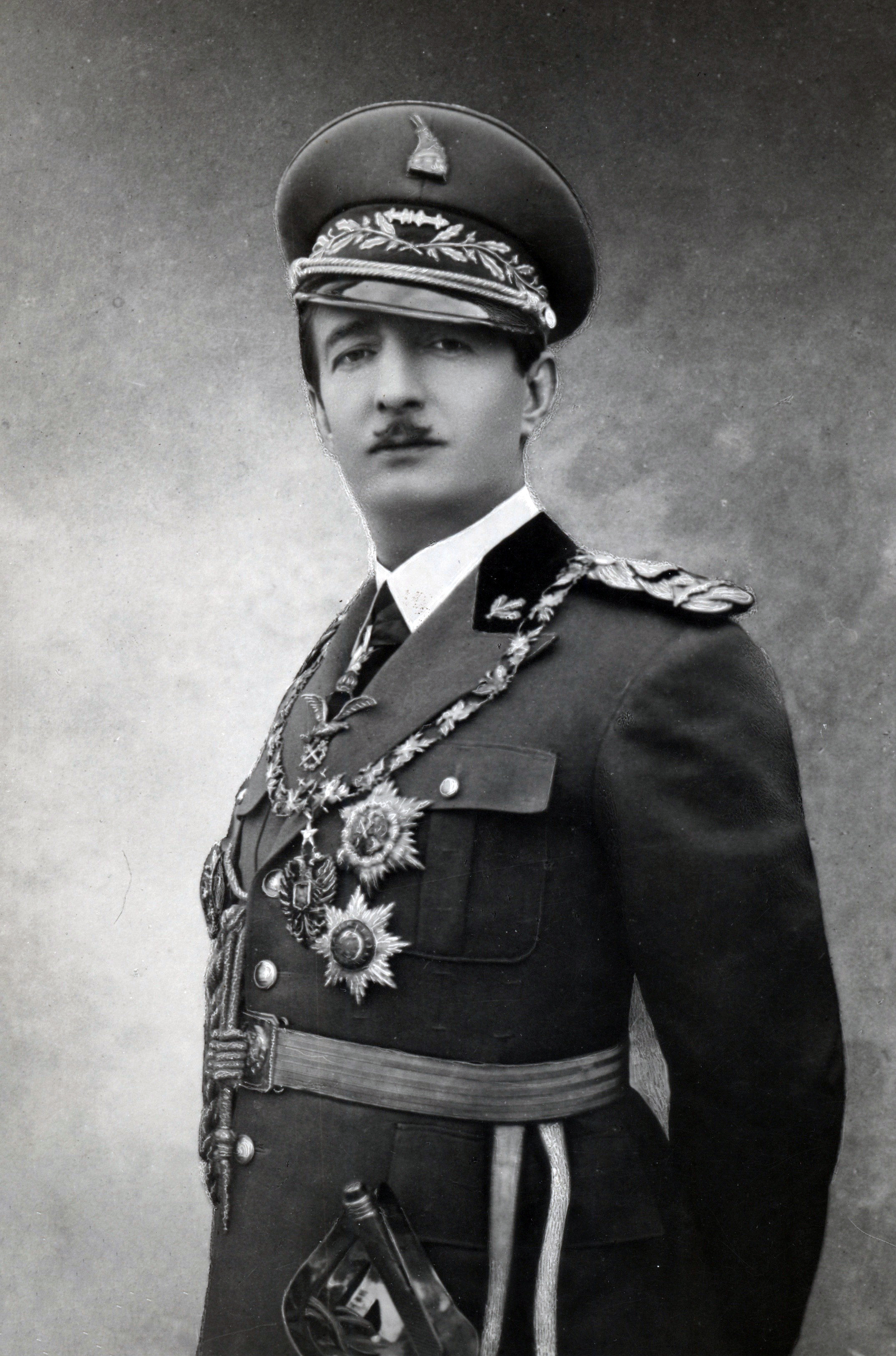
Prime minister, later king Ahmet Zog I (1895–1961)

In 1925, Ahmet Zog, an emerging politician from a prominent Muslim Albanian family became president of Albania and by 1929 installed himself as king. During the Zogist era, parliamentary representation was apportioned according to the size of the religious communities in Albania. The regime lasted until Zog's ousting during the Italian invasion of 1939 and within that time implemented a series of modernising measures meant to further curb Islam's influence in Albania and reverse the legacy of the Ottoman period. Amongst those were the abolition of Sharia law and replacement with Western law that made Muslims in Albania come under government control while the Quran was translated into Albanian and criticized for its inaccuracies. Increasing interference by the state of Islamic institutions led to Muslim clerics in 1926 to accuse the government of a propaganda campaign against the new madrasa in Shkodër, the new organisation of Jemaat (Islamic Community) and its finances. Clerics that went outside state oversight and delivered sermons in mosques without permission were threatened with action by authorities of offenders. As relations with the Muslim hierarchy and government officials became close, Islamic institutions were used by the state to implement social control like strengthening national unity, encouraging parents to send children to school and preventing diffusion of communist ideas. By 1929 with the centralisation and reform of Islamic institutions the state funded a sizable portion of the Islamic community's budget and madrasas were closed with one remaining in Tirana called Medreseja e Naltë to train clerics in new modern ways.

By the 1930s, intellectual trends regarding tradition and modernity had divided Muslim Albanians into three groups. The Elders (Të vjetër) favouring Islam; the Young (Të rinjtë) who objected to religion, in particular Islam and the Neo-Albanians (Neoshqiptarët) who emphasized Albanian culture, opposed religious sectarianism though not religion and favoured Bektashism due to its links with Albanian nationalism. Muslim Albanians resisted many of these changes on the restructuring of their Islamic committees, promoted da'wah or preaching of Islam to non-Muslim Albanians with risks of persecution, while their organisation underwent improvements. New mosques were also built such as the Great Mosque in Durrës while an Islamic Institute in Tirana was accommodating up to 240 students in 1936. After prolonged debate amongst Albanian elites during the interwar era and increasing restrictions, the wearing of the veil in 1937 was banned in legislation by Zog. Due to some Muslim Albanian clergy having trained and served in former Middle Eastern Ottoman territories like Turkey, Egypt, some throughout the interwar period maintained and others opened up new educational and literary links with the wider Muslim world even afar with British India. Part of the reason was to build up a corpus of literature through translations on Islam in the Albanian language which had recently been codified and make the Muslim religion be more accessible to the people. During the interwar period, Catholics viewed the Albanian central government as a Muslim one, while the Orthodox felt that in political contexts they were dominated by Muslims.

=== Sufism and Sufi orders ===
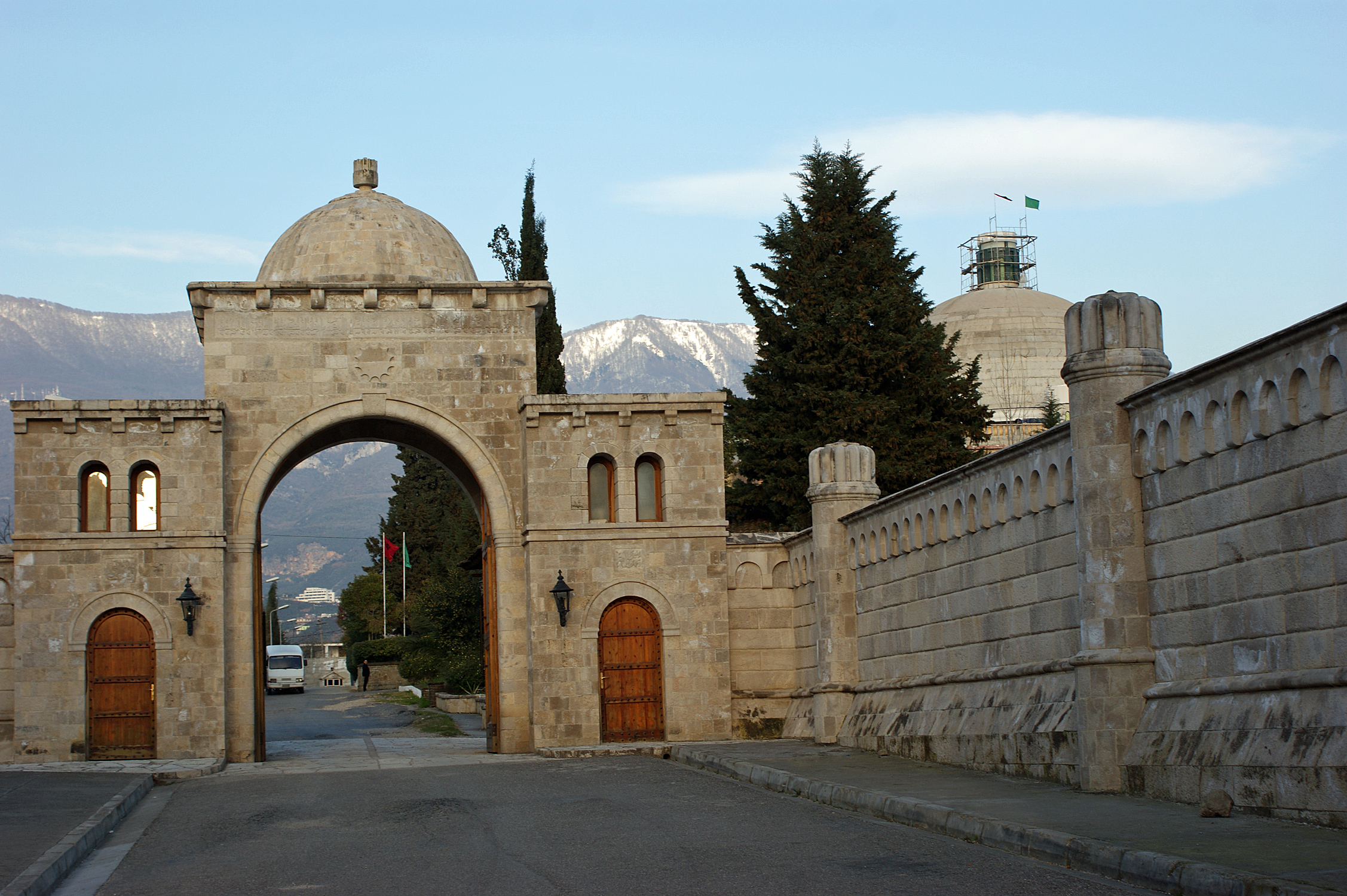
World Headquarters of the Bektashi Community in Tirana, Albania

Throughout the interwar period, the Albanian intellectual elite often undermined and depreciated Sunni Islam, whereas Sufism and its various orders experienced an important period of promising growth. After independence, ties amongst the wider Sufi Bektashi community in former Ottoman lands waned. The Bektashi order in 1922 at an assembly of 500 delegates renounced ties with Turkey. In 1925 the Bektashi Order whose headquarters were in Turkey moved to Tirana to escape Atatürk's secularising reforms and Albania would become the center of Bektashism where there were 260 tekes present. The Bektashi order in 1929 severed its ties with Sunnism and by 1937 Bektashi adherents formed around 27% of the Muslim population in Albania. Apart from Bektashis, there were other main Sufi orders present in Albania during the interwar period. The Halvetis in the interwar period were involved in proselytizing and also opened new tekes in Leskovik and Korçë. The Qadiris mainly located in urban areas and the Rufais, who spread their Tariqa order throughout Albania founding new tekes. While the Tijaniyyah order, an early 20th century newcomer to Tirana, Durrës and Shkodër rejected hereditary succession of the sheikhs, emphasised links with Muhammad and played a part in the reform movement of mainstream Islam in Albania. The sheikhs and dervishes of the various Sufi orders during the interwar period played an important role in Albanian society by often being healers to the public and Bektashi babas were at times involved in mediation of disputes and vendettas. By 1936 with the existence of individual Sufi organisations and leagues of the various orders, Albanian Muslim authorities formed an association named Drita Hyjnore (Divine Light) so as to reorganise and better coordinate the activities of four of the orders. While the Romani minority during the interwar period had their own mosques in Shkodër and Korçë, built a new mosque at Durrës in 1923 and some joined the Bektashi order.

== World War Two (1939–1945) ==
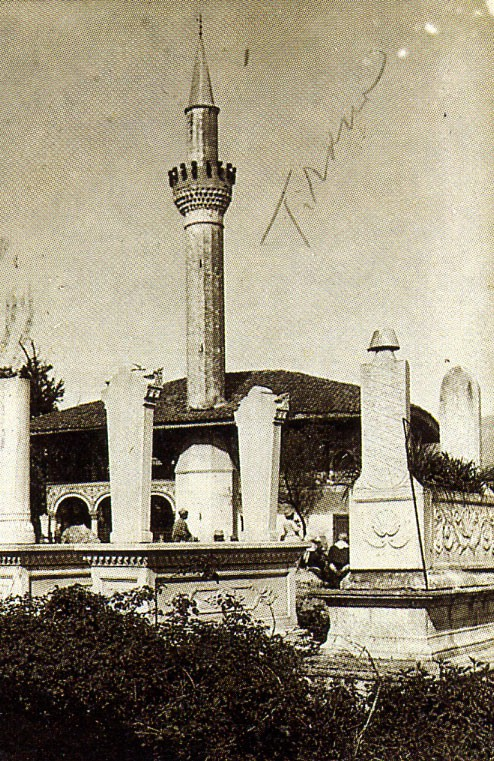
Former Sulejman Pasha Mosque of Tirana destroyed during World War Two and its minaret before 1967

On 7 April 1939, Italy headed by Benito Mussolini after prolonged interest and overarching sphere of influence during the interwar period invaded Albania. Muslim Albanians were involved in initial resistance to the Italians like major Abaz Kupi who with meagre weapons led Albanian forces and later resisted from the mountains of northern Albania, while King Zog fled abroad. The Italians established a local collaborationist government and some members came from the Muslim population like the landowning prime minister Shefqet Vërlaci. Albania's borders were expanded and encompassed contemporary western Macedonia, western and central Kosovo, parts of south western Montenegro which contained large Muslim Albanian populations and part of the Sandžak region that mainly had a Slavic Muslim population. Due to Zog having creating a compliant leadership of all the religious groups, the arrival of the Axis forces was met with almost no issue from them. Of the Muslim Albanian population, the Italians attempted to gain their sympathies by proposing to build a large mosque in Rome, though the Vatican opposed this measure and nothing came of it in the end. The Italian occupiers also won the sympathy of Albanian Muslims by causing their working wages to rise. Mussolini's son in law Count Ciano also replaced the leadership of the Sunni Muslim community, which had recognized the Italian regime in Albania with clergy that aligned with Italian interests, with an easily controlled "Moslem Committee" organization, and Fischer notes that "the Moslem community at large accepted this change with little complaint". While most of the Bektashi order and its leadership were against the Italian occupation and remained an opposition group. Fischer suspects that the Italians eventually tired of the opposition of the Bektashi Order, and had its head, Nijaz Deda, murdered. Except from the Bektashis, the Italians allocated money for the budgets of the three other religious communities during their time in Albania.

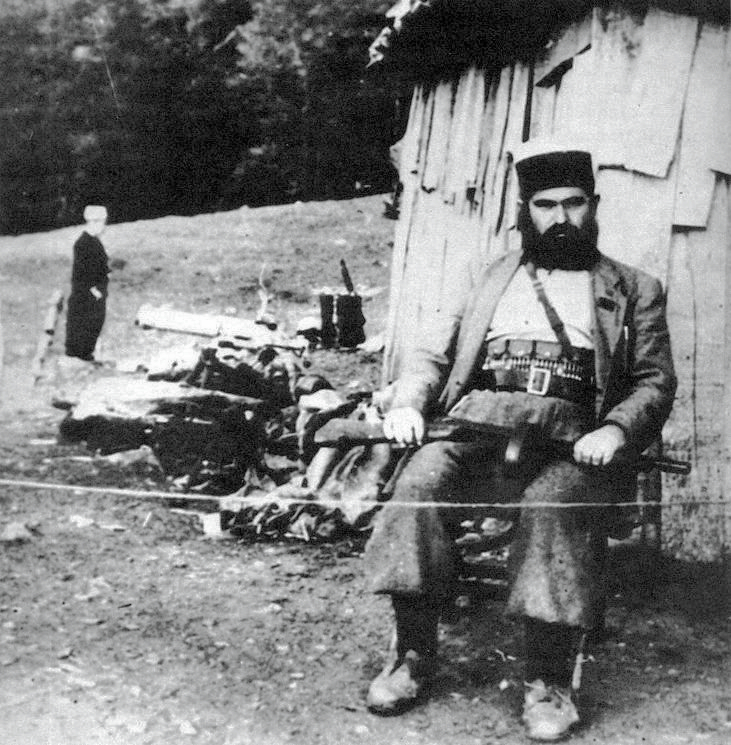
Baba Faja Martaneshi in 1944

In Albania two main opposition forces emerged that fought against the Axis occupation of the country. The first was Balli Kombëtar an Albanian nationalist and anti-communist movement that sought the unification of Balkan Albanian inhabited lands into one state. It fought the Italians though concerned with the communists rise they eventually aligned with the Germans toward the war's end and some prominent members from their movement were Muslims like Ali Këlcyra and prime minister Midhat Frashëri. An Albanian resistance communist movement emerged in southern Albania and Albanian Muslims were represented among its leadership ranks such as Mustafa Gjinishi, Enver Hoxha, Mehmet Shehu and others. Independent resistance çetas or groups separate from the main Albanian resistance forces also emerged and were led by Muslims such as Myslim Peza and the Bektashi Baba Faja Martaneshi of whom both eventually aligned with the communists and Muharrem Bajraktari with Balli Kombëtar. Attempts to unite the two main resistance groups with the Mukje Agreement (1943) failed and protracted conflict occurred until the end of the war in which the Albanian communists prevailed over Balli Kombëtar and retreating Axis forces.

== See also ==
- Albanian National Awakening
- Albania during the Balkan Wars
- Albania during World War I
- Albanian Republic
- Albania during World War II
- Albanian Kingdom (1928–39)
