= Islam in Albania =

Islam in Europe by percentage of country population 95–100%: Azerbaijan; 90–95%: Turkey; Kosovo; 50–70%: Albania; Bosnia and Herzegovina; Kazakhstan; 30–35%: North Macedonia; 10–20%: France; Sweden; Georgia; Montenegro; 5–10%: Austria; Belgium; Bulgaria; Denmark; Germany; Liechtenstein; Luxembourg; Netherlands; Russia; Switzerland; United Kingdom; Spain; Greece; 4–5%: Serbia; 2–4%: Italy; Finland; Norway; Malta; Slovenia; Cyprus (Note: Only takes into account the Muslim population residing on land controlled by the Republic of Cyprus.); 1–2%: Croatia; Ireland; Ukraine; Andorra; < 1%: Iceland; Armenia; Belarus; Czech Republic; Estonia; Hungary; Latvia; Lithuania; Moldova; Monaco; Poland; Portugal; Romania; San Marino; Slovakia

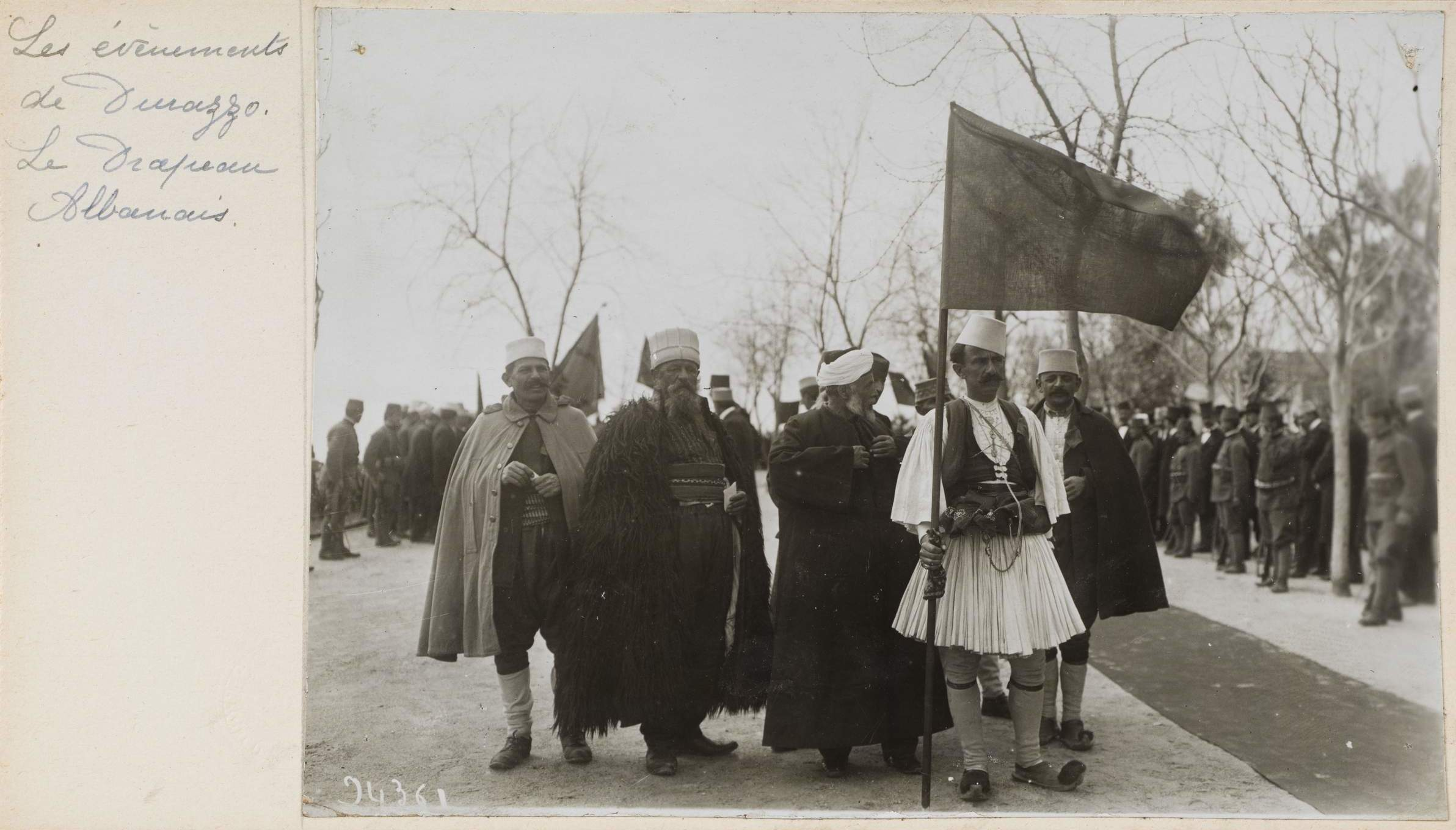
Sunni and Bektashi clergymen alongside Albanian patriots holding an Albanian flag in 1914

Islam arrived in Albania mainly during the Ottoman period when the majority of Albanians over time converted to Islam under Ottoman rule. Following the Albanian National Awakening (Rilindja) tenets and the de-emphasis of religious tradition in Albania, all governments in the 20th century pursued a secularization policy, most aggressively under the People's Socialist Republic of Albania, which actively persecuted Muslims. Due to this policy, Islam, as with all other faiths in the country, underwent radical changes. Decades of state atheism, which ended in 1991, brought a decline in the religious practice of all traditions. The post-communist period and the lifting of legal and other government restrictions on religion allowed Islam to revive through institutions that generated new infrastructure, literature, educational facilities, international transnational links and other social activities.

According to the 2023 census, 51% of the population are Muslim, with 46% being Sunni Muslims and 5% being Bektashi.

== History ==
=== 13th century ===
Albania first came into contact with Islam in the 13th century when Angevin expansion into Albania during the reign of Charles I Anjou was made possible in part by Muslim involvement. Lucera is located only about 240 km northwest of Brindisi, which was the main port of disembarkation. Charles claimed rights in Albania, as Manfred's successor, since 1267 when the Treaty of Viterbo was drawn up. During the winter of 1271, the Angevin forces took Durrës. Within a year, Charles began to use the title "rex Albaniae", a title that was later recognized by the king of Serbia and the tsar of Bulgaria. In 1273, both Muslim and Christian contingents sailed across the Adriatic. In April 1273, a Muslim from Lucera named Leone was appointed captain of the Muslim forces in Durrës. A month later, Musa took Leone's place as commander of 200 Muslims stationed "in partibus Romaniae". Although relations between the Church of Rome and Byzantium improved, Charles I of Anjou continued to send Muslim and Christian military forces to the east, towards Albania. The Muslim knight Salem, a regular army officer, led 300 Lucerians - archers and lancers - to Vlora, in 1275. In September of that year, Ibrahim became the captain of the Muslims of Durrës, who took the place of Musa. On 19 April 1279, Charles I ordered 53 of the best Muslim archers from Lucera to be selected by the Capitanata's justiciary, Guy d'Allemagne, to go to Durrës. As usually happens in the recruitment process, the advice of Muslim military leaders was sought. Ibrahim had to approve the selections. Orders were given that Ibrahim could take four horses with him as he crossed from Brindisi to Durrës. Ibrahim served in Durrës again in the early 1280s, as did a man from Lucera, named Pietro Cristiano. One source identifies him as "de... terra Lucerie Saracenorum", most likely a Christian convert from Islam. The demand for Muslim carpenters and blacksmiths to build war machines in Albania was so great during the summer of 1280 that it threatened to exhaust the skilled workers' pool for the construction of forts on the Italian coast. In June 1280, the king ordered the archers of the Capitanata and the Land of Bari to send 60 Muslim archers, as well as carpenters, stonemasons and blacksmiths to Albania. The archers had to report to Hugues le Rousseau de Sully in Berat. In the fall of the same year, 200 archers from Lucera were sent to Vlora. At the beginning of December, 300 archers were stationed in Durrës. Angevin forces took part in the unsuccessful siege of Berat castle, and were repulsed by Byzantine forces.

=== Conversion and consolidation (15th–18th centuries) ===
Islam was further introduced to Albania in the 15th century after the Ottoman conquest of the area. During the 17th and 18th centuries, Albanians in large numbers converted to Islam. As Muslims, many Albanians attained important political and military positions within the Ottoman Empire and culturally contributed to the wider Muslim world.

=== National Awakening (19th and early 20th centuries) ===
By the 19th century, Albanians were divided into three religious groups. Catholic Albanians who had some Albanian ethno-linguistic expression in schooling and church due to Austro-Hungarian protection and Italian clerical patronage. Orthodox Albanians under the Patriarchate of Constantinople had liturgy and schooling in Greek and toward the late Ottoman period mainly identified with Greek national aspirations. Muslim Albanians during this period formed around 70% of the overall Balkan Albanian population in the Ottoman Empire with an estimated population of more than a million. With the rise of the Eastern Crisis, Muslim Albanians became torn between loyalties to the Ottoman state and the emerging Albanian nationalist movement. Islam, the Sultan and the Ottoman Empire were traditionally seen as synonymous in belonging to the wider Muslim community. the Albanian nationalist movement advocated self-determination and strived to achieve socio-political recognition of Albanians as a separate people and language within the state.

Wars and socio-political instability resulting in increasing identification with the Ottoman Empire amongst some Muslims within the Balkans during the late Ottoman period made the terms Muslim and Turk synonymous. In this context, Muslim Albanians of the era were conferred and received the term Turk, despite preferring to distance themselves from ethnic Turks. This practice has somewhat continued amongst Balkan Christian peoples in contemporary times who still refer to Muslim Albanians as Turks, Turco-Albanians, with often pejorative connotations and historic negative socio-political repercussions. These geo-political events nonetheless pushed Albanian nationalists, many Muslim, to distance themselves from the Ottomans, Islam and the then emerging pan-Islamic Ottomanism of Sultan Abdulhamid II. Another factor overlaying these concerns during the Albanian National Awakening (Rilindja) period were thoughts that Western powers would only favour Christian Balkan states and peoples in the anti Ottoman struggle. During this time Albanian nationalists conceived of Albanians as a European people who under Skanderbeg resisted the Ottoman Turks that later subjugated and cut the Albanians off from Western European civilisation. Albanian nationalism overall was a reaction to the gradual breakup of the Ottoman Empire and a response to Balkan and Christian national movements that posed a threat to an Albanian population that was mainly Muslim. Muslim (Bektashi) Albanians were heavily involved with the Albanian National Awakening producing many figures like Faik Konitza, Ismail Qemali, Midhat Frashëri, Shahin Kolonja and others advocating for Albanian interests and self-determination.

During the late Ottoman period, Muslims inhabited compactly the entire mountainous and hilly hinterland located north of the Himarë, Tepelenë, Këlcyrë and Frashëri line that encompasses most of the Vlorë, Tepelenë, Mallakastër, Skrapar, Tomorr and Dishnicë regions. There were intervening areas where Muslims lived alongside Albanian speaking Christians in mixed villages, towns and cities with either community forming a majority or minority of the population. In urban settlements Muslims were almost completely a majority in Tepelenë and Vlorë, a majority in Gjirokastër with a Christian minority, whereas Berat, Përmet and Delvinë had a Muslim majority with a large Christian minority. A Muslim population was also located in Konispol and some villages around the town. The Ottoman administrative sancaks or districts of Korçë and Gjirokastër in 1908 contained a Muslim population that numbered 95,000 in contrast to 128,000 Orthodox inhabitants. Apart from small and spread out numbers of Muslim Romani, Muslims in these areas that eventually came to constitute contemporary southern Albania were all Albanian speaking Muslims. In southern Albania during the late Ottoman period being Albanian was increasingly associated with Islam, while from the 1880s the emerging Albanian National Movement was viewed as an obstacle to Hellenism within the region. Some Orthodox Albanians began to affiliate with the Albanian National movement causing concern for Greece and they worked together with Muslim Albanians regarding shared social and geo-political Albanian interests and aims. In central and southern Albania, Muslim Albanian society was integrated into the Ottoman state. It was organised into a small elite class owning big feudal estates worked by a large peasant class, both Christian and Muslim though few other individuals were also employed in the military, business, as artisans and in other professions. While northern Albanian society was little integrated into the Ottoman world, it was instead organised through a tribal structure of clans (fis) of whom many were Catholic with others being Muslim residing in mountainous terrain that Ottomans often had difficulty in maintaining authority and control. When religious conflict occurred it was between clans of opposing faiths, while within the scope of clan affiliation, religious divisions were sidelined. Shkodër was inhabited by a Muslim majority with a sizable Catholic minority.

=== Independence ===
==== Balkan Wars (1912–13) and World War One (1914–18) ====
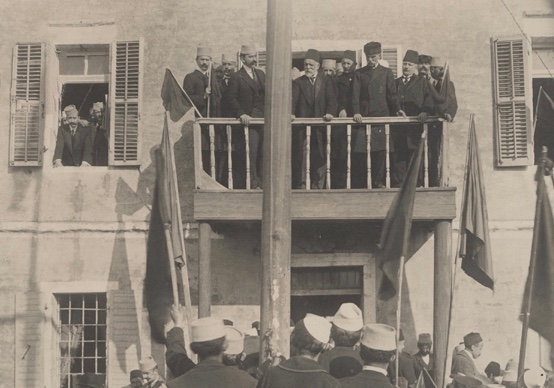
Ismail Qemali on the first anniversary of the session of the Assembly of Vlorë which proclaimed the Independence of Albania.

Realising that the collapse of Ottoman rule through military defeat in the Balkans was imminent, Albanians represented by Ismail Qemali declared Independence from the Ottoman Empire on 28 November 1912 in Vlorë. International recognition of Albanian independence entailed the imposition of a Christian monarch which alongside internal political power struggles generated a failed Muslim uprising (1914) in central Albania that sought to restore Ottoman rule. During World War one, northern, central and south-central Albania came under Austro-Hungarian occupation. In the census of 1916–18 conducted by Austro-Hungarian authorities, the results showed that Muslims in the regions of Dibër, Lumë and Gorë were over 80% of the population. In the western part of the mountainous areas, Shkodër and in the mountains east of the lake were areas that contained a large Muslim population. In central Albania, the area from the Mat region to the Shkumbini river mouth toward Kavajë encompassing the districts of Tiranë, Peqin, Kavajë and Elbasan the population was mainly Muslim. In the area of Berat Muslims were a majority population with an Orthodox minority, while south of Elbasan Muslims were a plurality alongside a significant Orthodox population. In the region of Gramsh Muslims were a majority except for two people and in the southern Peqin area only Muslims were present. Muslims also were a majority population in the Mallakastër region alongside a small Orthodox minority. The experience of World War One, concerns over being partitioned and loss of power made the Muslim Albanian population support Albanian nationalism and the territorial integrity of Albania. An understanding emerged between most Sunni and Bektashi Albanians that religious differences needed to be sidelined for national cohesiveness. Whereas an abandonment of pan-Muslim links abroad was viewed in the context of securing support internationally for and maintaining independence, though some Muslim Albanian clergy were against disavowing ties with the wider Muslim world.

==== Interwar period (1919–39): State interference and reforms ====
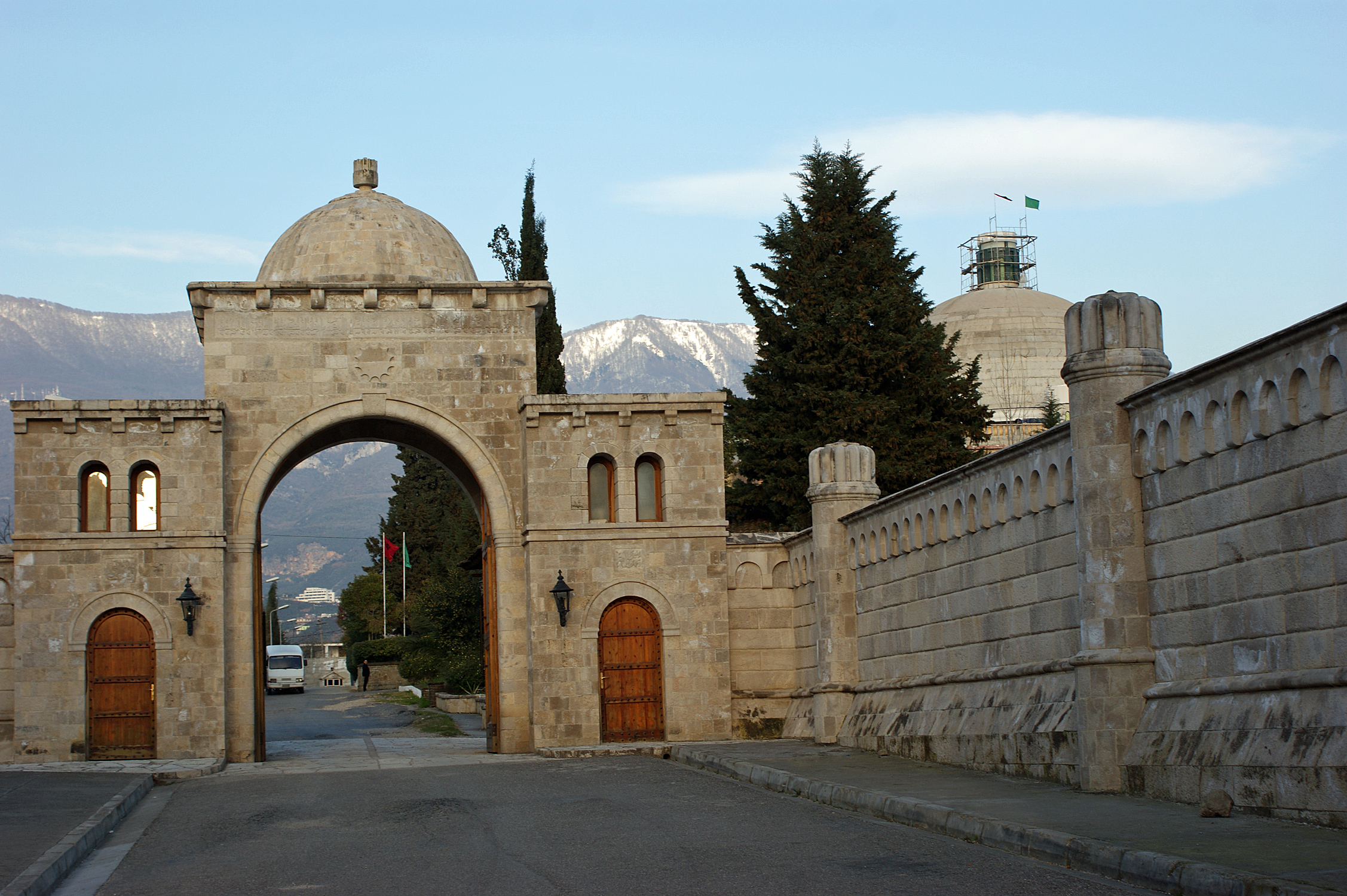
World Headquarters of the Bektashi Community in Tirana.

From the early days of interwar Albania and due to Albania's heterogeneous religious makeup, Albania's political leadership defined Albania as without an official religion. Muslim Albanians at that time formed around 70% of the total population of 800,000 and Albania was the only Muslim country in Europe. In the former Ottoman districts of Korçë and Gjirokastër forming southern Albania, the share of the Muslim population increased in 1923 to 109,000 in contrast to 114,000 Orthodox and by 1927, Muslims were 116,000 to 112,000 Orthodox. From 1920 until 1925, a four-member governing regency council from the four religious denominations (Sunni, Bektashi, Catholic, Orthodox) was appointed. Albanian secularist elites pushed for a reform of Islam as the process of Islamic religious institutions were nationalised and the state increasingly imposed its will upon them. At the first Islamic National Congress (1923) the criteria for delegates attending was that being a cleric was unimportant and instead patriots with a liberal outlook were favoured alongside some delegates being selected by the state. Government representatives were present at the congress. Following the government program of reforms, the Albanian Islamic congress in Tirana decided to deliberate and reform some Islamic traditional practices adopted from the Ottoman period with the reasoning of allowing Albanian society the opportunity to thrive. The measures adopted by the congress was a break with the Ottoman Caliphate and to establish local Muslim structures loyal to Albania, banning polygamy (most of the Muslim Albanian population was monogamous) and the mandatory wearing of veil (hijab) by women in public. A new form of prayer was also implemented (standing, instead of the traditional salat ritual).

As with the congress, the attitudes of Muslim clerics were during the interwar period monitored by the state who at times appointed and dismissed them at will. Amongst those were the abolition of Sharia law and replacement with Western law that made Muslims in Albania come under government control while the Quran was translated into Albanian and criticized for its inaccuracies. After prolonged debate amongst Albanian elites during the interwar era and increasing restrictions, the wearing of the veil in 1937 was banned in legislation by Zog. Throughout the interwar period, the Albanian intellectual elite often undermined and depreciated Sunni Islam, whereas Sufi Islam and its various orders experienced an important period of promising growth. After independence, ties amongst the wider Sufi Bektashi community in former Ottoman lands waned. The Bektashi order in 1922 at an assembly of 500 delegates renounced ties with Turkey. In 1925 the Bektashi Order whose headquarters were in Turkey moved to Tiranë to escape Atatürk's secularising reforms and Albania would become the center of Bektashism where there were 260 tekes present. In 1929, the Bektashi order severed its ties with Sunnism and by 1937 Bektashi adherents formed around 27% of the Muslim population in Albania. Apart from Bektashis, there were other main Sufi orders present in Albania during the interwar period such as the Halvetis, Qadiris, Rufais and Tijaniyyah.

==== World War Two (1939–45) ====
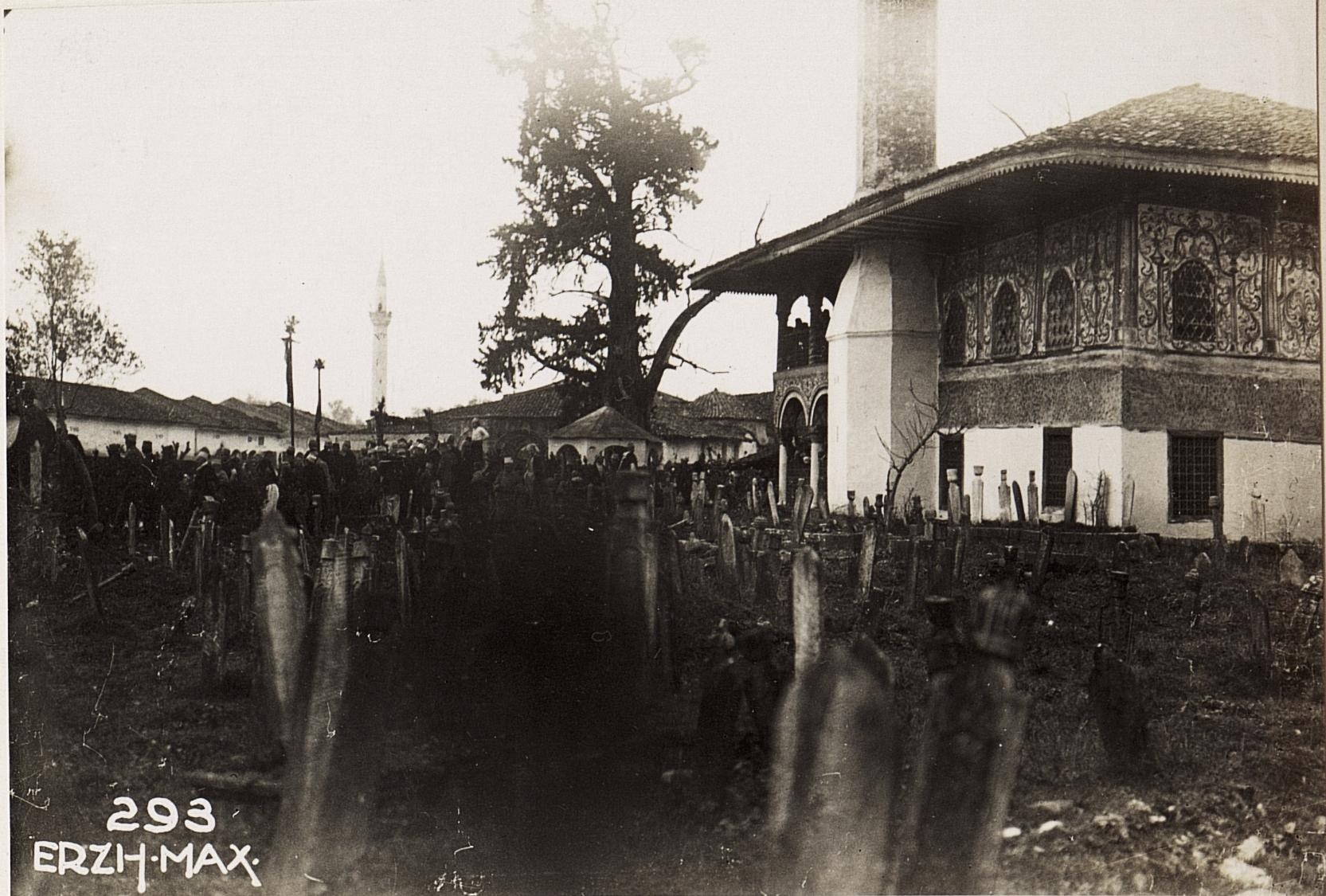
Former Sulejman Pasha Mosque and Muslim graveyard of Tiranë destroyed during World War Two and its minaret in 1967

On 7 April 1939, Italy headed by Benito Mussolini after prolonged interest and overarching sphere of influence during the interwar period invaded Albania. Of the Muslim Albanian population, the Italians attempted to gain their sympathies by proposing to build a large mosque in Rome, though the Vatican opposed this measure and nothing came of it in the end. The Italian occupiers also won Muslim Albanian sympathies by causing their working wages to rise. Mussolini's son in law Count Ciano also replaced the leadership of the Sunni Muslim community, which had recognized the Italian regime in Albania with clergy that aligned with Italian interests, with an easily controlled "Moslem Committee" organization, and Fischer notes that "the Moslem community at large accepted this change with little complaint". Most of the Bektashi order and its leadership were against the Italian occupation and remained an opposition group. Fischer suspects that the Italians eventually tired of the opposition of the Bektashi Order, and had its head, Nijaz Deda, murdered.

==== Communist period, state atheism and violent persecution (1945–91) ====
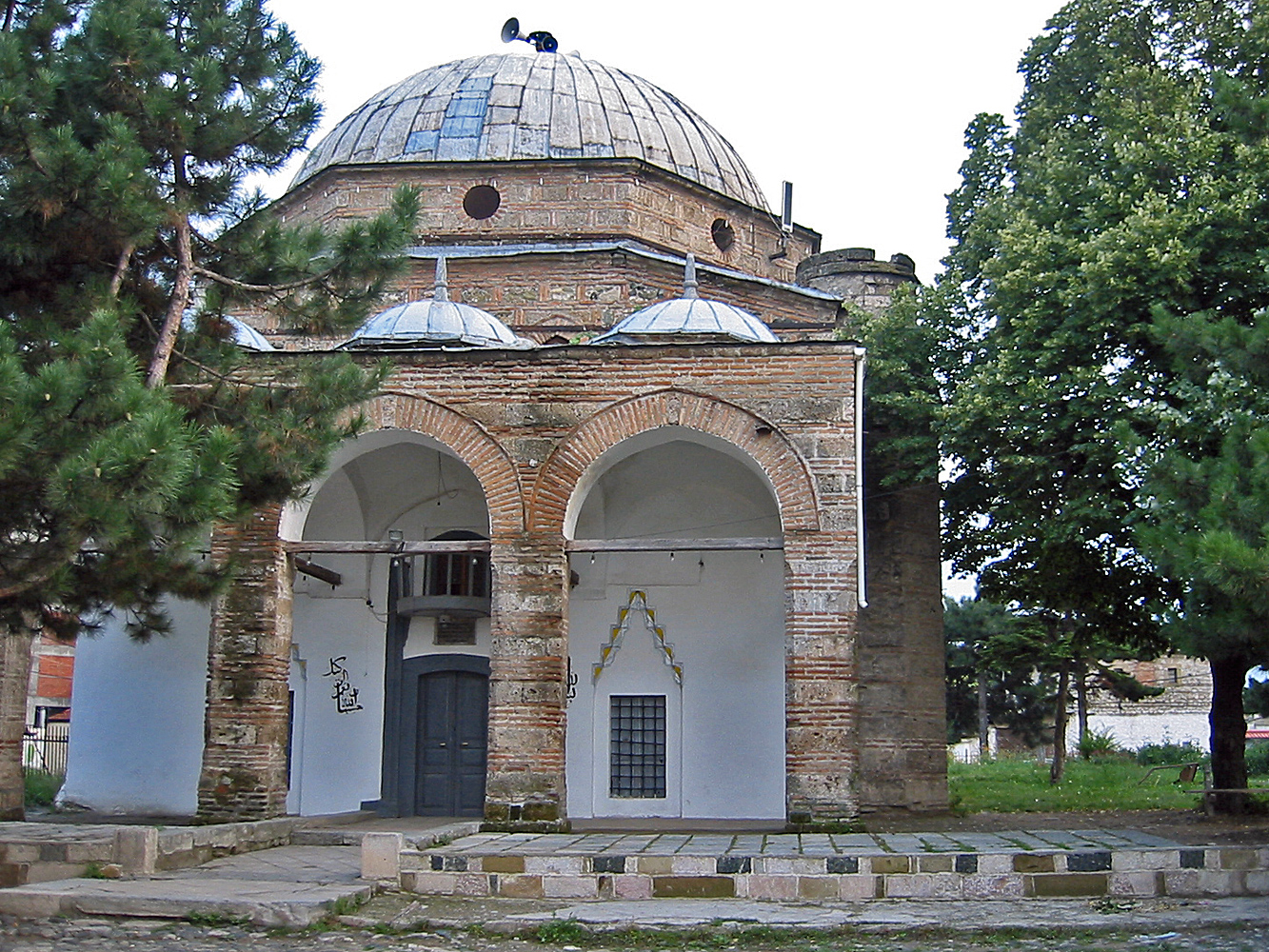
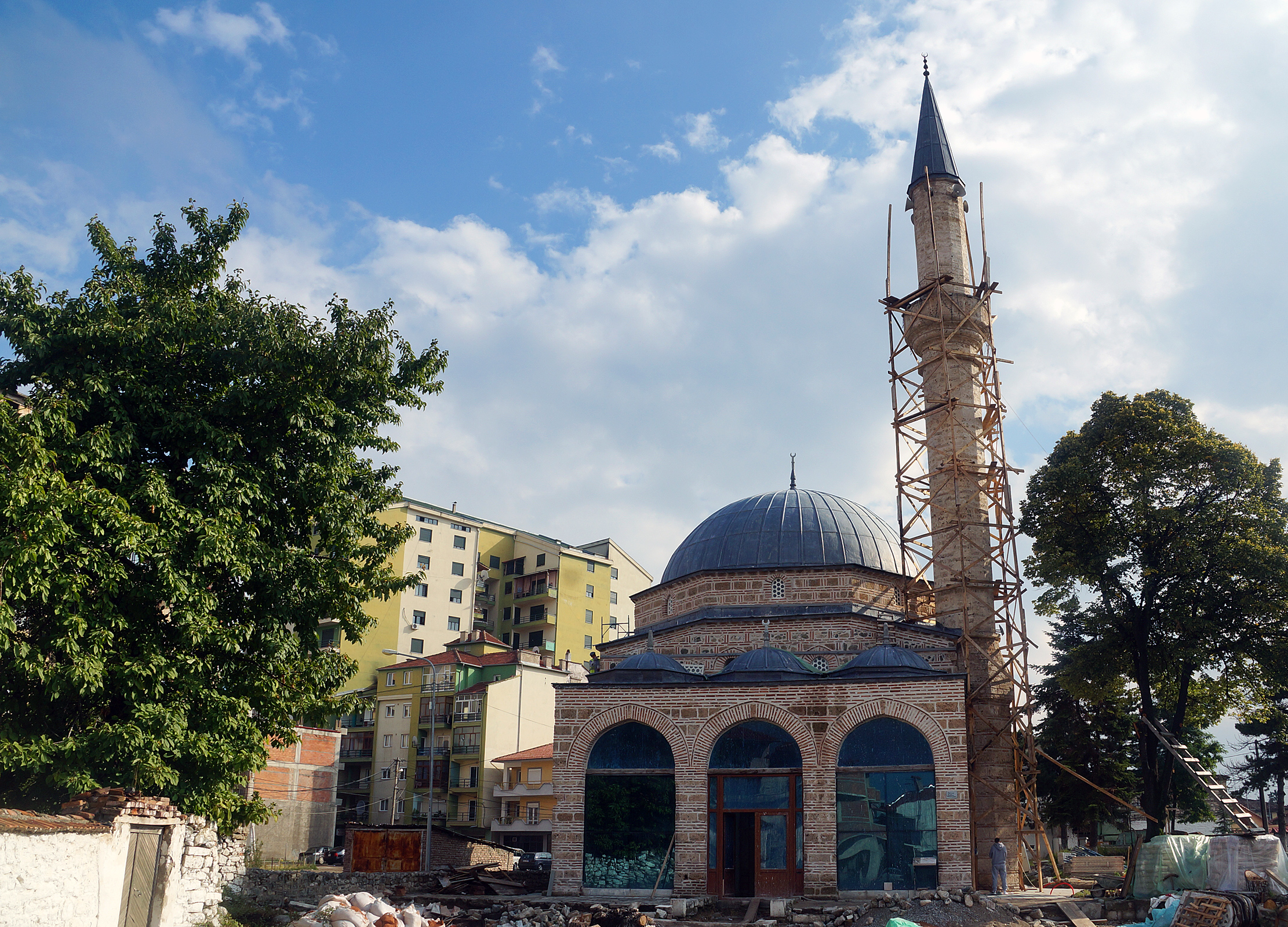
Mirahori Mosque of Korçë in 2002 with destroyed minaret from communist times (left) and with rebuilt minaret in 2013 (right).

In the aftermath of World War Two, the communist regime came to power and Muslims, most from southern Albania, were represented from early on within the communist leadership group, such as leader Enver Hoxha (1908–1985), his deputy Mehmet Shehu (1913–1981) and others. Albanian society was still traditionally divided between four religious communities. In the Albanian census of 1945, Muslims were 72% of the population, 17.2% were Orthodox and 10% Catholic. The communist regime through Albanian Nationalism attempted to forge a national identity that transcended and eroded these religious and other differences with the aim of forming a unitary Albanian identity. Albanian communists viewed religion as a societal threat that undermined the cohesiveness of the nation. Within this context, religions like Islam were denounced as foreign and clergy such as Muslim muftis were criticised as being socially backward with the propensity to become agents of other states and undermine Albanian interests. The communist regime through policy destroyed the Muslim way of life and Islamic culture within Albania.

Inspired by Pashko Vasa's late 19th century poem for the need to overcome religious differences through Albanian unity, Hoxha took the stanza "the faith of the Albanians is Albanianism" and implemented it literally as state policy. In 1967 therefore the communist regime declared Albania the only non-religious country in the world, banning all forms of religious practice in public. The Muslim Sunni and Bektashi clergy alongside their Catholic and Orthodox counterparts suffered severe persecution and to prevent a decentralisation of authority in Albania, many of their leaders were killed. Jumu'ah or communal Friday prayers in a mosque that involves a sermon afterwards were banned in Albania due to their revolutionary associations that posed a threat to the communist regime. People who still performed religious practices did so in secret, while others found out were persecuted and personal possession of religious literature such as the Quran forbidden. Amongst Bektashi adherents transmission of knowledge became limited to within few family circles that mainly resided in the countryside. Mosques became a target for Albanian communists who saw their continued existence as exerting an ideological presence in the minds of people. Through the demise of mosques and religion in general within Albania, the regime sought to alter and sever the social basis of religion that lay with traditional religious structures amongst the people and replace it with communism. Islamic buildings were hence appropriated by the communist state who often turned into them into gathering places, sports halls, warehouses, barns, restaurants, cultural centres and cinemas in an attempt to erase those links between religious buildings and people. In 1967 within the space of seven months, the communist regime destroyed 2,169 religious buildings and other monuments. Of those were some 530 tekes, turbes and dergah saint shrines that belonged mainly to the Bektashi order. 740 mosques were destroyed, some of which were prominent and architecturally important like the Kubelie Mosque in Kavajë, the Clock Mosque in Peqin and the two domed mosques in Elbasan dating from the 17th century. Of the roughly 1,127 Islamic buildings existing in Albania prior to the communists coming to power, only 50 mosques remained thereafter with most being in a state of disrepair.

=== Republic of Albania (1992 onward) ===
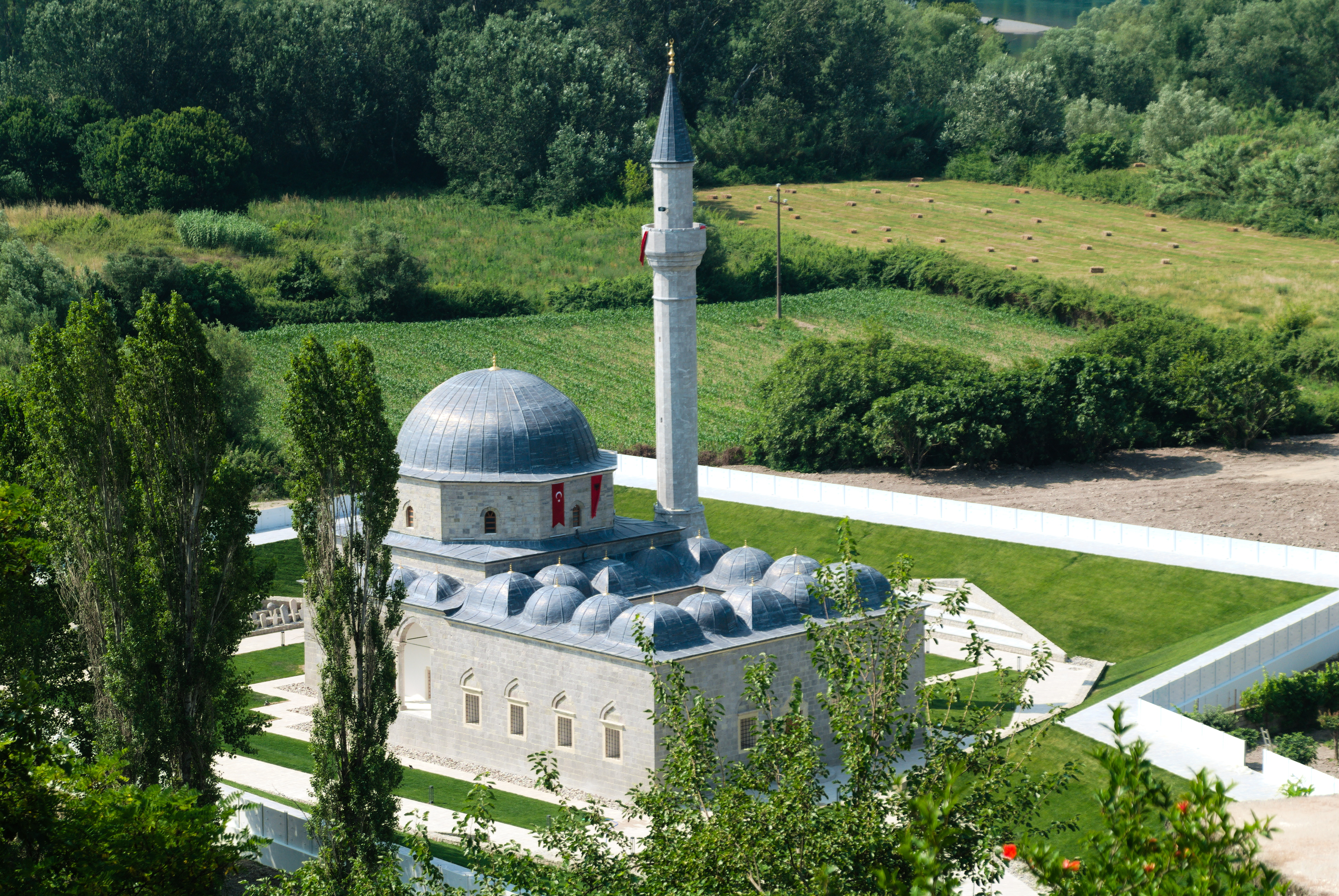
Lead Mosque, Shkodër, commissioned by the Pasha of Scutari Mehmed Bushati. Previously prone to flooding damage, it was jointly restored by the Albanian and Turkish governments in 2021.

Following the wider trends for socio-political pluralism and freedom in Eastern Europe from communism, a series of fierce protests by Albanian society culminated with the communist regime collapsing after allowing two elections in 1991 and then 1992. Toward the end of the regime's collapse, it had reluctantly allowed for limited religious expression to reemerge. In 1990 along with a Catholic church, the Lead mosque in Shkodër were both the first religious buildings reopened in Albania. Muslims, this time mainly from northern Albania such as Azem Hajdari (1963–1998) and Sali Berisha, who later served multiple terms as president and prime minister were prominent leaders in the movement for democratic change and between 1992 and 1997 people part of the Albanian government were mostly of a Muslim background. Areas that had been traditionally Muslim in Albania prior to 1967 reemerged in a post-communist context once again mainly as Muslim with its various internal complexities. Due in part to the deprivation and persecution experienced during the communist period, Muslims within Albania have shown strong support for democracy and its institutions including official Muslim religious organisations. Within this context Muslim Albanians have also supported the separation of religion from the state with faith being considered as a personal private matter. Today, Albania is a parliamentary secular state and with no official religion.

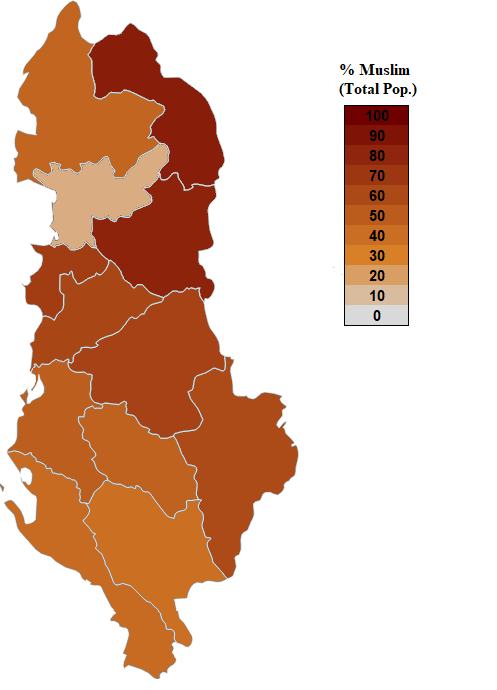
Distribution of Muslims in Albania (2011)

==== Revival of Sunni Islam ====
In the 1990s, Muslim Albanians placed their focus on restoring institutions, religious buildings and Islam as a faith in Albania that had overall been decimated by the communists. Hafiz Sabri Koçi, (1921–2004) an imam imprisoned by the communist regime and who led the first prayer service in Shkodër 1990 became the grand mufti of the Muslim Community of Albania. During this time the restoration of Islam in Albania appealed to older generations of Muslim Albanian adherents, those families with traditional clerical heredity and limited numbers of young school age people who wished to qualify and study abroad in Muslim countries. Most mosques and some madrassas destroyed and damaged during the communist era had by 1996 been either reconstructed or restored in former locations where they once stood before 1967 and in contemporary times there are 555 mosques. Muslim religious teachers and prayer leaders were also retrained abroad in Muslim states or in Albania. The Muslim Community of Albania is the main organisation overseeing Sunni Islam in Albania and during the 1990s, it received funding and technical support from abroad to reconstitute its influence within the country. Due to interwar and communist era legacies of weakening Islam within Albania and secularisation of the population, the revival of the faith has been somewhat difficult due to people in Albania knowing little about Islam and other religions. Emigration in a post-communist environment of Albanians, many Muslim, has also hindered the recovery of religion, its socio-religious structures and organisation in Albania. In contemporary times the Muslim community has found itself being a majority population that is within a socio-political and intellectual minority position with often being on the defensive. Political links also emerged in the 1990s from parts of the Sunni Albanian community with the then new Albanian political establishment of whom some themselves were Muslim Albanians. The Sunni community is recognised by the Albanian state and it administers most of the mosques while also viewed as the main representative of Muslims in the country. As such it interprets its position as safeguarding an Albanian specific version of Islam which follows on institutional and ideological models established during the post-Ottoman state-building period and have gradually gained the status of an Albanian tradition. There are a few prayer houses located throughout Albania and one mosque run by the Sufi Rifai order.

==== Sunni Islam, transnational links, education and administrative institutions ====
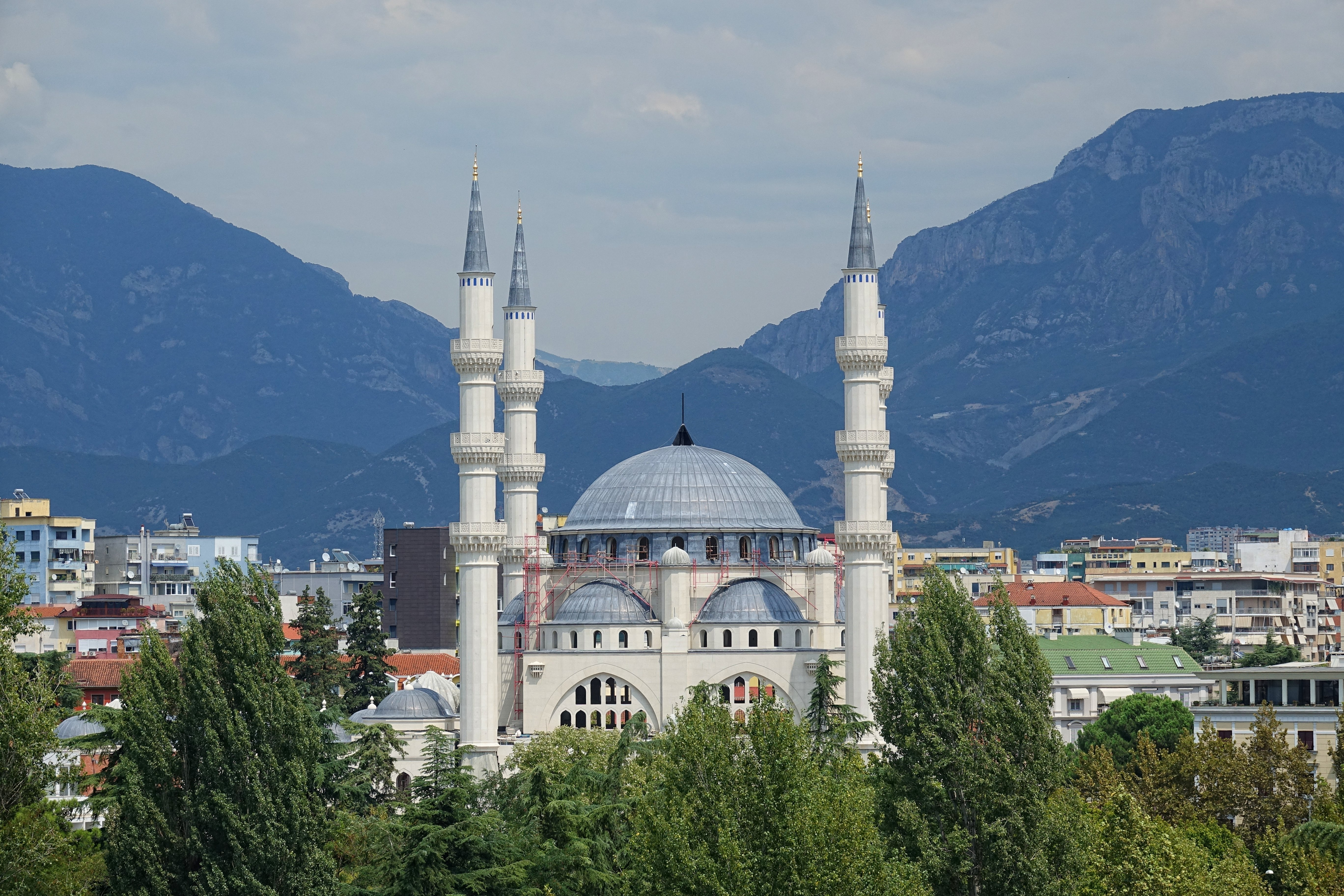
Great Mosque of Tiranë under construction, August 2018

The Albanian Sunni Community has over time established links with overseas Muslims. Due to funding shortages in Albania these ties have been locally beneficial as they have mobilised resources of several well funded international Muslim organisations like the OIC which has allowed for the reestablishment of Muslim ritual and spiritual practices in Albania. Particular efforts have been directed toward spreading information about Islam in Albania through media, education and local community centres. Around 90% of the budget of the Albanian Muslim community came from foreign sources in the 1990s, though from 2009 after the signing of agreements, the Albanian government allocates funding from the state budget to the four main religions to cover administrative and other costs. Some of these oversees Muslim organisations and charities coming from Arab countries, Turkey, Malaysia, Indonesia, and also the Muslim diaspora in Europe and America have at times exerted sway over the Muslim Albanian community resulting in competition between groups.

The Gülen movement based on Muslim values of Turkish preacher Fethullah Gülen also is present from 1992 onward and its institutions are viewed as a counterweight to more conservative Muslim organisations from Arab countries in Albania, especially in the early 1990s. Some 7 madrasas (Muslim colleges containing complementary religious instruction) were opened up in Albania by Arab NGO's, although now 2 are administered by the Muslim Community and the Gülen movement runs 5 madrassas and other schools that are known for their high quality and mainly secular education based on Islamic ethics and principles. In April 2011, Bedër University, Albania's first Muslim university was opened in Tiranë and is administered by the Gülen movement. The presence and influence of the Gülen movement in Albania has recently been a source of tension with the Turkish government headed by Recep Tayyip Erdogan since it has blamed the movement for attempting to destabilize Turkey. The main state run Turkish Muslim organisation Diyanet has funded and started construction of the Great Mosque of Tiranë in 2015. The mosque will be the Balkans largest with minarets 50 meters high and a dome of 30 meters built on a 10,000-square-meter parcel of land near Albania's parliament building able to accommodate up to 4,500 worshipers. International assistance from oversees organisations such as the Turkish International Cooperation and Development Agency (TIKA) have also helped finance the restoration of Ottoman era mosques, of which only nine survived the communist dictatorship. In a post-communist environment the Muslim Community of Albania has been seeking from successive Albanian governments a return and restitution of properties and land confiscated by the communist regime though without much progress.

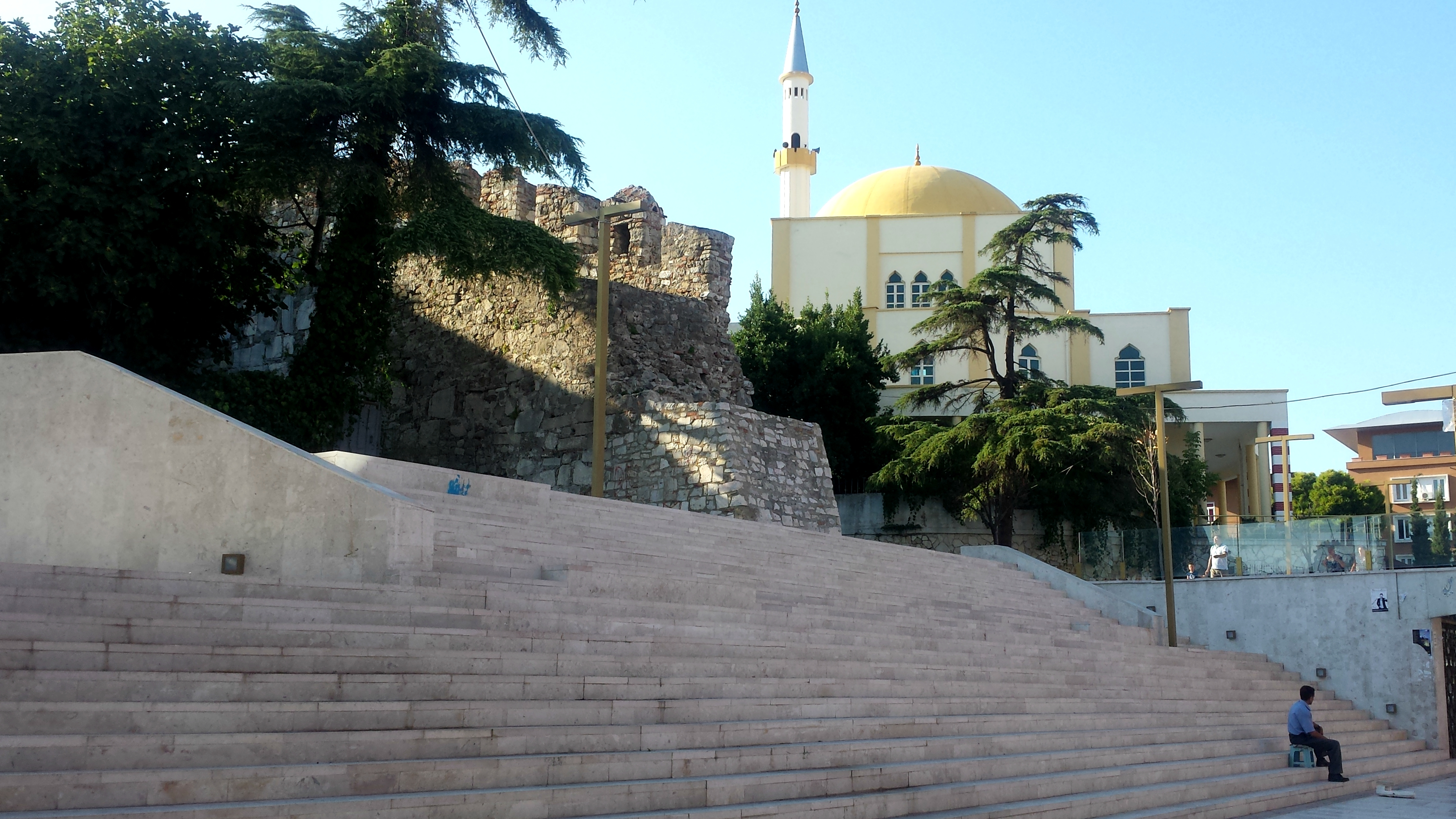
Great Mosque of Durrës built in 1931

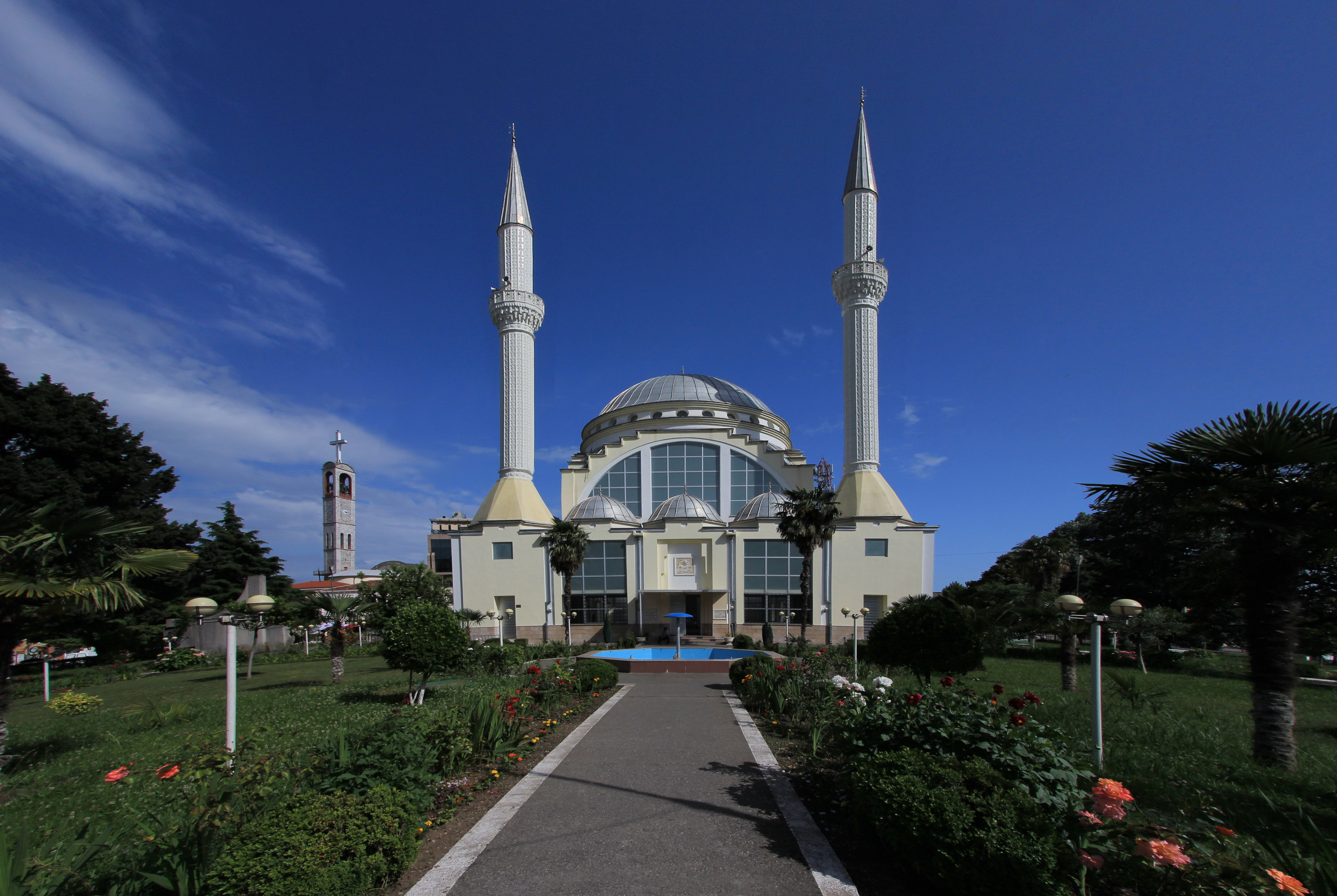
Ebu Beker Mosque in Shkodër

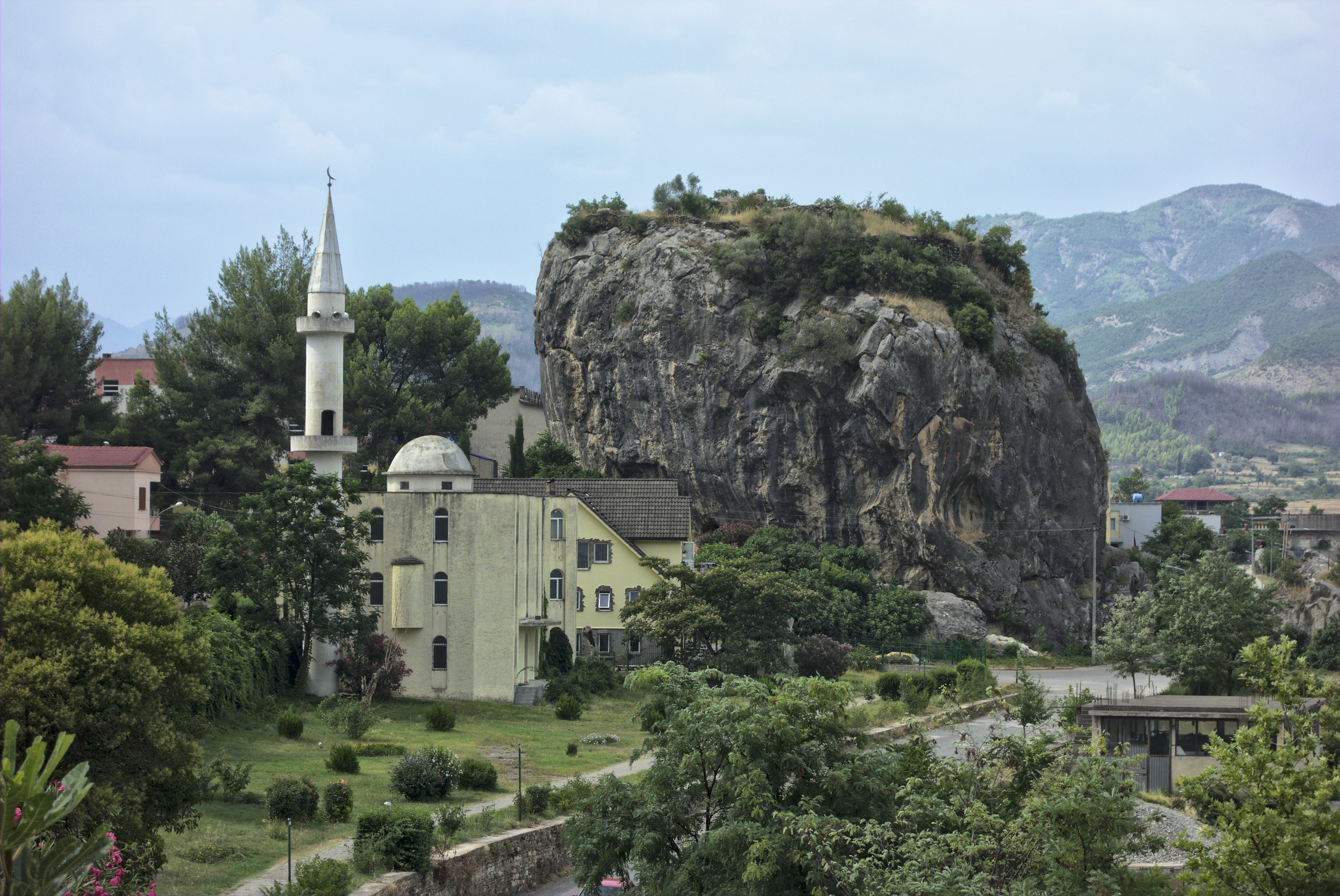
Mosque in Përmet

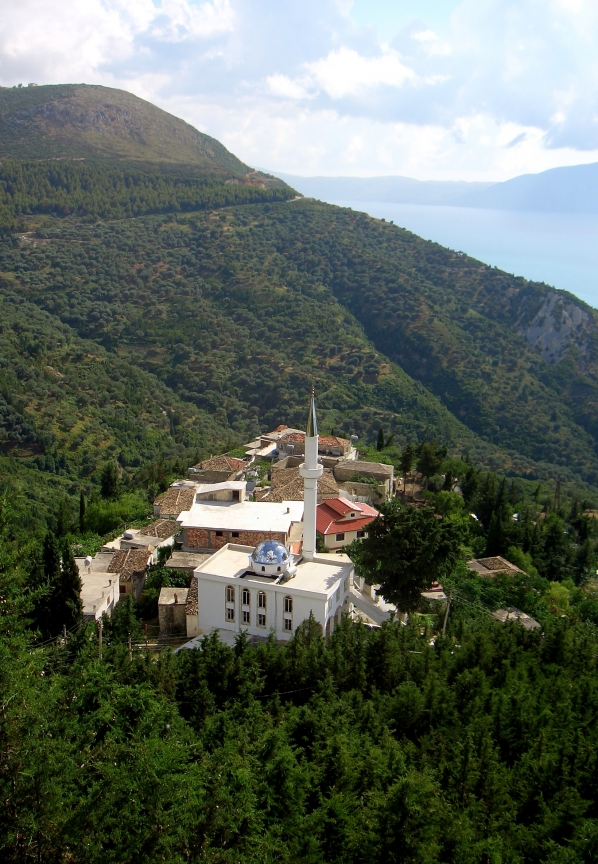
New Mosque in Kaninë

==== Revival of Sufi Islam ====
The Muslim Community of Albania in its statutes claims authority over all Muslim groups in Albania. Sufi Sunni Islam was the dominants form of Islam in Albania under the Ottomans However the traditional reliance on the establishment hierarchy and internal structures of the restoration of Sufi Islam, historically synonymous to Sunni Islam, has faced organisational problems in reestablishing and stabilising former systems of authority. That stood in contrast with the activities of local people who were quick to rebuild the destroyed tyrbes and other mausoleums of Sufi saints by the end of 1991. As Albanian migrants went abroad financial resources were sent back to fund other reconstruction projects of various Sufi shrines and tekkes. The Shia Bektashi order in the 1990s was only able to reopen 6 of its tekkes. the rest of Sufi orders are present in Albania such as the Rifais, Saidis, Halvetis, Qadiris and the Tijaniyah are Sunni and combined have 384 turbes, tekes, maqams and zawiyas. In post communist Albania competition between the Sufi orders has reemerged, though the Bektashi remain the largest, most dominant, have 138 tekes and have on occasion laid claims to Sufi shrines of other orders. The Bektashi as the main Sufi order within Albania have attempted to appeal to a younger, urban and also intellectual demographic and placing itself within the wider socio-political space.

==== Bektashism ====
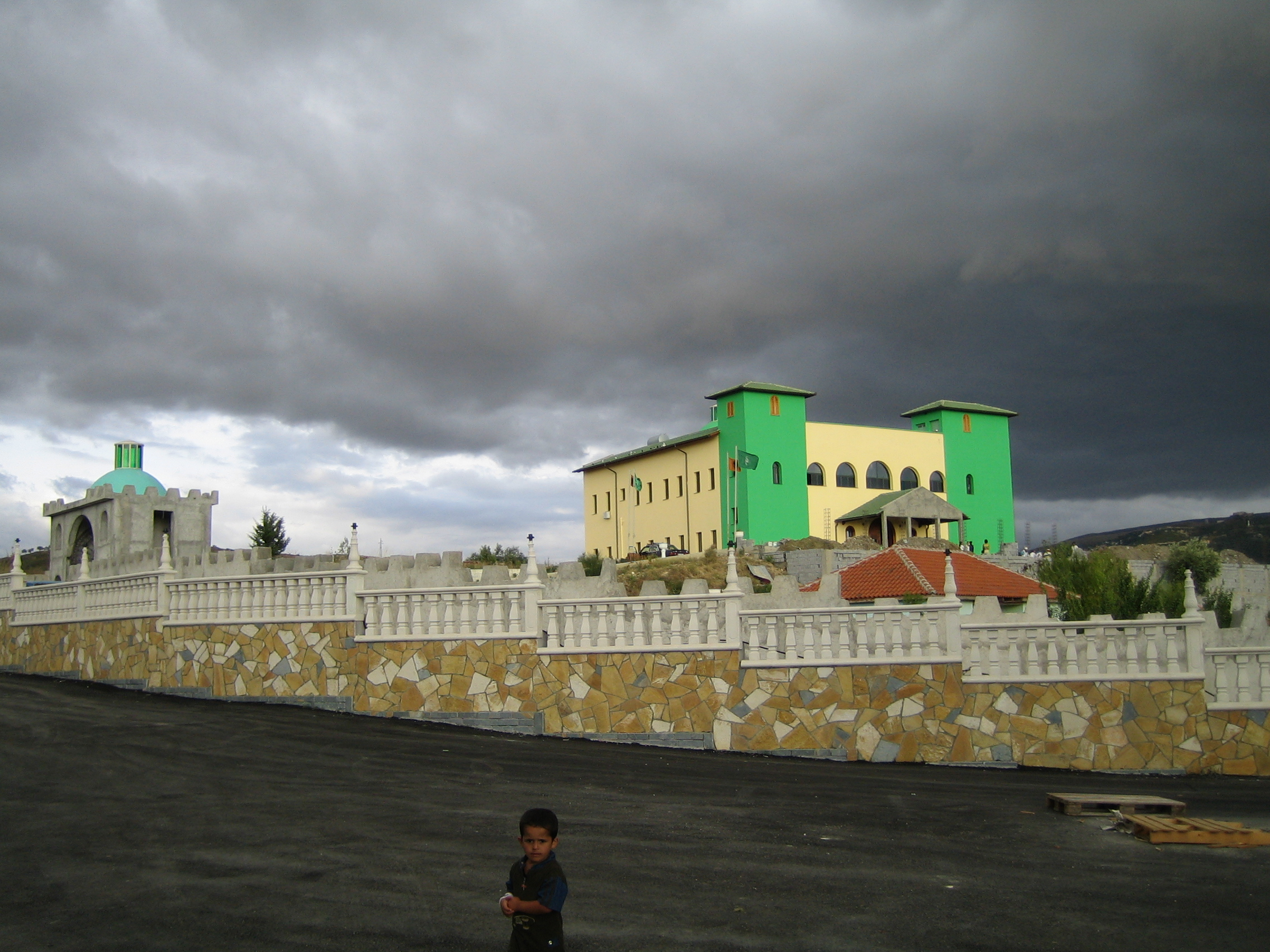
Bektashi teqe in Vlorë.

The Bektashi order in Albania is a Shia Sufi order. They views themselves as the centre of a worldwide movement and have reconnected with various Turkish educational and Iran religious organisations emphasising their common links, something that other Sufi orders in Albania have done. Prominent among these have been Iranian Saadi Shriazi foundation who has funded numerous Bektashi cultural programs, while dervishes from the Bektashi have received educational training at the Theological faculty in Qom. The Bektashi though are selective of outside influence, with sometimes for example editing texts of Iranian Shia thinkers in Bektashi literature or borrowing from others. The Bektashi during most of the 1990s had no privileged links with the political establishment until 1997 when the Socialists came to power. Members from the then Albanian government, some with Bektashi heritage in the late 1990s onward have favoured Bektashism as a milder form of Islam for Albanian Islam and it playing a role as a conduit between Islam and Christianity. Bektashis also highlight and celebrate figures such as Naim Frashëri who was made an honorary baba because he was involved in the Albanian National Awakening and often referred to his Bektashi roots. Bektashis also use Shiite related iconography of Ali, the Battle of Karbala and other revered Muslim figures of Muhammad's family that adorn the interiors of turbes and tekkes. The Bektashis have a few clerical training centres though no schools for religious instruction.

==== Ahmadiyya ====
The Ahmadiyya movement has also established recently a presence in Albania and owns one mosque in Tiranë, the Bejtyl Evel Mosque.

== Demographics ==
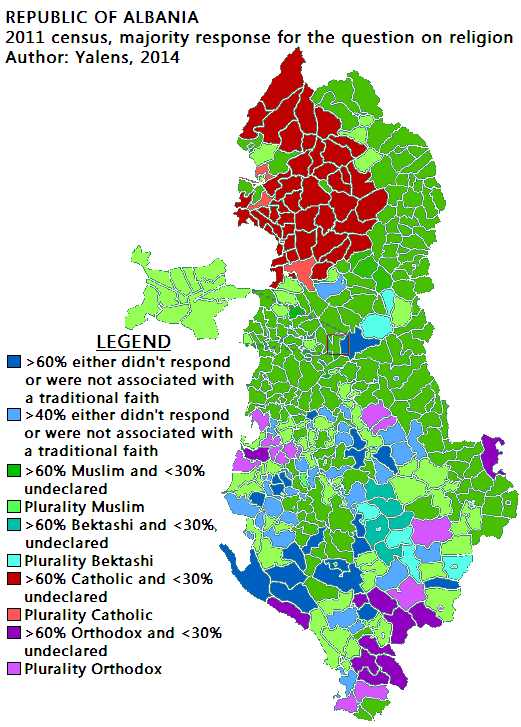
(2011 census)

In 2011, a Pew Research Center population estimate in a global study based on growth rates put the percentage of Muslims in Albania at 82.1% (estimated number 2,601,000) However, a Gallup poll gave percentages of religious affiliations with only 43% Muslim, 19% Eastern Orthodox, 15% Catholic and 23% atheist or nonreligious. The previous 2011 census the declared religious affiliation of the population was: 56.70% (1,587,608) Sunni Muslims, 2.09% (58,628) Bektashis, 10.03% (280,921) Catholics, 6.75% (188,992) Orthodox, 0.14% (3,797) Evangelists, 0.07% (1,919) other Christians, 5.49% (153,630) believers without denomination, 2.05% (69,995) Atheists, 13.79% (386,024) undeclared. Controversies surrounded the Albanian census (2011) over whether a religious affiliation option should be part of the count as people like some intellectuals in Albania feared that the results may make Albania appear "too Muslim" to Europe. From previous pre-communist highs of 69.3% (1937) and 72% (1947) the official census of 2011 was the first to count religious affiliation after an absence of many decades that showed the Albanian Muslim population to have decreased to 56.70%. The Muslim community of Albania objected to having the generic Muslim option split according to internal differentiation into categories such as Bektashi. The census results overall have been criticized by the Muslim community of Albania and they have estimated the number of all Muslims in Albania to be 70%. Owing to the large number of people in Albania not having declared a religion the census figures leave scope for other explanations and analyses of what is the actual religious composition of Albania.

A December 2024 survey by the Konrad Adenauer Foundation (KAS) found that 41.5% of Albanians believe in God without following a specific religion (33.8%) or identify as atheist or agnostic (7.2%). Sunni Muslims make up 36.0% of the population, while 17.2% are Christians (7.9% Catholic, 8.0% Orthodox, and 1.3% Protestant or other Christian denominations). Additionally, 5.2% adhere to Bektashism and 0.5% adhere other Shia tariqas.

=== Islam by county (2011 and 2023 Census) ===
Share of Muslims and Bektashis by county, 2011 and 2023 censuses
County	Emblem	Muslims (%)			Bektashis (%)			Muslim + Bektashi combined (%)		
		2011	2023	Change	2011	2023	Change	2011	2023	Change
Berat County		50.18%	40.11	−10.07%	8.23%	8.10%	−0.13%	58.41%	48.21%	−10.2%
Dibër County	Emblem of Dibër County	81.40%	76.04%	−5.36%	3.84%	5.89%	+2.05	85.24%	81.93%	−3.31%
Durrës County		67.46%	56.43%	−11.03%	1.60%	5.32%	+3.72	69.06%	61.75%	−7.31%
Elbasan County		64.41%	52.94%	−11.47	0.51%	1.37%	+0.86	64.92%	54.31%	−10.61
Fier County		48.52%	39.00%	−9.52	1.01%	5.88%	+4.87	49.53%	44.88%	−4.65
Gjirokastër County		38.54%	14.40%	−24.14	8.48%	21.04%	+12.56	47.01%	35.44%	−11.57
Korçë County		58.98%	49.03%	−9.95	2.07%	4.57%	+2.50	61.05%	53.60%	−7.45
Kukës County		83.81%	84.92%	+1.11	0.00%	0.51%	+0.51	83.81%	85.43%	+1.62
Lezhë County		14.81%	17.52%	+2.71	0.13%	0.58%	+0.45	14.94%	18.10%	+3.16
Shkodër County		44.84%	47.08%	+2.24	0.07%	0.20%	+0.13	44.91%	47.28%	+2.37
Tiranë County		62.29%	70%	+8%	2.66%	4.95%	+2.29	64.94%	53.62%	−11.32
Vlorë County		42.14%	31.93%	−10.21	1.08%	6.32%	+5.24	43.22%	38.25%	−4.97

=== Ethno-linguistic composition ===
Most Muslims in Albania are ethnic Albanians. There are however small though significant clusters of non-Albanian (speaking) Muslims in the country. The Romani minority in Albania are mostly Muslims and estimated to number some 50,000 to 95,000 located throughout Albania and often residing in major urban centres forming a significant minority population. The Romani community is often economically disadvantaged with at times facing socio-political discrimination and distance from wider Albanian society like for example little intermarriage or neighbourhood segregation. Within the Romani community there exist two main divisions: the Gabels who speak the Romani language and those who self identify as Jevgs that consider themselves separate from the Romani, speak Albanian and are somewhat integrated in Albania. The Romani in Albania were and are still known to be religiously syncretic often combining other elements of religions and nature in Islamic practices and pilgrimages to holy sites.

Other Muslim communities are of a Slavic linguistic background. In the north-eastern borderland region of Gorë, the Gorani community inhabits the villages of Zapod, Pakisht, Orçikël, Kosharisht, Cernalevë, Orgjost, Orshekë, Borje, Novosej and Shishtavec. In the central-eastern borderland region of Gollobordë, a Muslim Macedonian speaking community known as Gollobordas inhabits the villages of Ostren i Madh, Kojavec, Lejçan, Lladomericë, Ostren i Vogël, Orzhanovë, Radovesh, Tuçep, Pasinkë, Trebisht, Gjinovec, Klenjë, Vërnicë, Steblevë and three families in Sebisht. In Albania people from the Gollobordas community are considered Albanians instead of Macedonians, even by the Albanian state, and they are known to intermarry with Muslim Albanians and not with Orthodox Macedonians. Until the 1990s an Orthodox Macedonian minority who have since migrated used to live in some villages alongside the Gollobordas and the latter community in recent times numbers some roughly 3,000 people. The Bosniak community of the Shijak area whose presence dates back to 1875 inhabits almost entirely the village of Borakaj and in the neighbouring village Koxhas they live alongside Albanians and form a minority. Bosniaks from these settlements have also settled in Durrës, Shijak and in 1924 some went and settled in the village of Libofshë where they have mostly become linguistically assimilated. There is a small Muslim Montenegrin speaking community near Shkodër whose presence dates back to 1878 and are known as Podgoriçani, due to their origins from Podgorica in Montenegro. Podgoriçani inhabit the villages of Boriç i Madh where they form a majority alongside a few Orthodox Montenegrins and some Albanians, while they live compactly in both Shtoj i Vjetër with 30 families and in Shtoj i Ri with 17 families and some families in Shkodër city.

=== Ethno-cultural Albanian identity and Islam ===
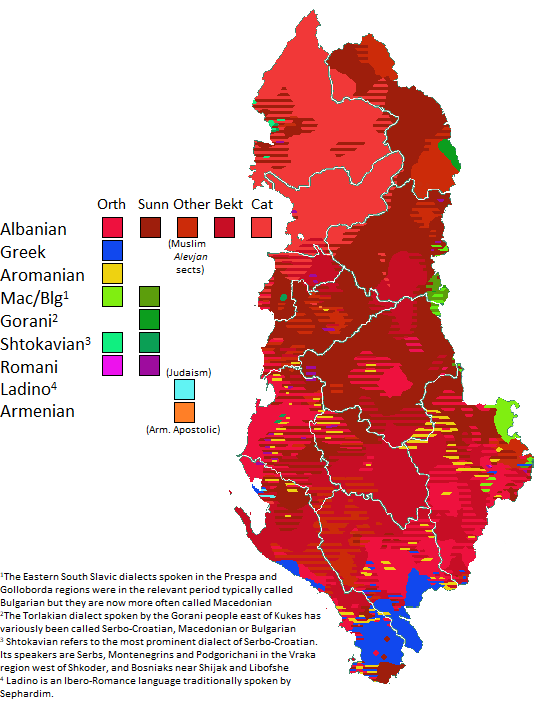
Religious and linguistic map of Albania. The Muslim population is as follows: Albanian Sunni (cherry red), Bektashi (burgundy) and other Sufi (crimson red); Macedonian speakers (Kelly green), Gorani (forest green); Bosniaks (jade green) and Romani (purple).

Throughout the duration of the Communist regime, national Albanian identity was constructed as being irreligious and based upon a common unitary Albanian nationality. This widely spread ideal is still present, though challenged by religious differentiation between Muslim Albanians and Christians which exists at a local level. In a post communist environment, religious affiliation to either Muslim and Christian groups is viewed within the context of historical belonging (mainly patrilineal) and contemporary social organisation as cultural communities with religious practice playing a somewhat secondary to limited role.

=== Islam and Interreligious relations ===
In rural areas in northern Albania and southern Albania, relations between Muslim Albanians and Catholic Albanians or Muslim Albanians with Orthodox Albanians vary and are often distant with both Muslim and Christian communities traditionally living in separate villages and or neighbourhoods, even within cities. Various pejoratives are in use today for different religious groups in Albanian, some based on the Ottoman system of classification: turk, tourko-alvanoi/Turco-Albanians (in Greek), muhamedan/followers of Muhammad for Muslim Albanians, kaur/infidel, kaur i derit/infidel pigs, for Orthodox Albanians, Catholic Albanians, Greeks, Vlachs and Orthodox Macedonians. Among Muslims in Albania the term used for their religious community is myslyman and the word turk is also used in a strictly religious sense to connote Muslim and not ethnic affiliation, while Christians also use the word kaur to at times refer to themselves. During the Albanian socio-political and economic crisis of 1997, religious differences did not play a role in the civil unrest that occurred, though the Orthodox Church in Albania at the time privately supported the downfall of the Berisha government made up mainly of Muslims. Over the years minor incidents between Muslim Albanians with Christian Albanians have occurred such as pig heads thrown into mosque courtyards, Catholic tombstones being knocked down, an Orthodox church in Shkodër being bombed and damage done to frescoes in a church in Voskopojë. An interreligious organisation called the Interreligious Council of Albania was created in 2009 by the four main faiths to foster religious coexistence in Albania.

In southern Albania, urban centres of central Albania and partially in northern Albania, the status of Christianity dominates in contrast to Islam which is viewed by some Muslim Albanians as a historic accident. A rejection of Islam has also been attributed to a divide that has opened up between older city dwellers and rural Muslim Albanian and somewhat conservative newcomers from the north-east to cities like Tiranë, where the latter are referred to pejoratively as "Chechens". Some young Muslim Albanians educated in Islamic Universities abroad have viewed their role as defending Islam in the public sphere over issues such as wearing of the veil, organising themselves socially and criticised the Muslim Albanian establishment. Following the lead mainly of Albanian Christians obtaining visas for work into Greece there have been instances where Muslim Albanian migrants in Greece converted to Orthodoxy and changed their names into Christian Greek forms in order to be accepted into Greek society. Some other Muslim Albanians when emigrating have also converted to Catholicism and conversions in general to Christianity within Albania are associated with belonging and interpreted as being part of the West, its values and culture. A 2015 study estimated some 13,000 Christians exist in Albania who had converted from a Muslim background, though it is not clear to which Christian churches these people were affiliated. Among Albanians and in particular the young, religion is increasingly not seen as important. In a Pew research centre survey of Muslim Albanians in 2012, religion was important for only 15%, while 7% prayed, around 5% went to a mosque, 43% gave zakat (alms), 44% fasted during Ramadan and 72% expressed a belief in God and Muhammad. The same Pew survey also estimated that 65% of Albanian Muslims are non-denominational Muslims.

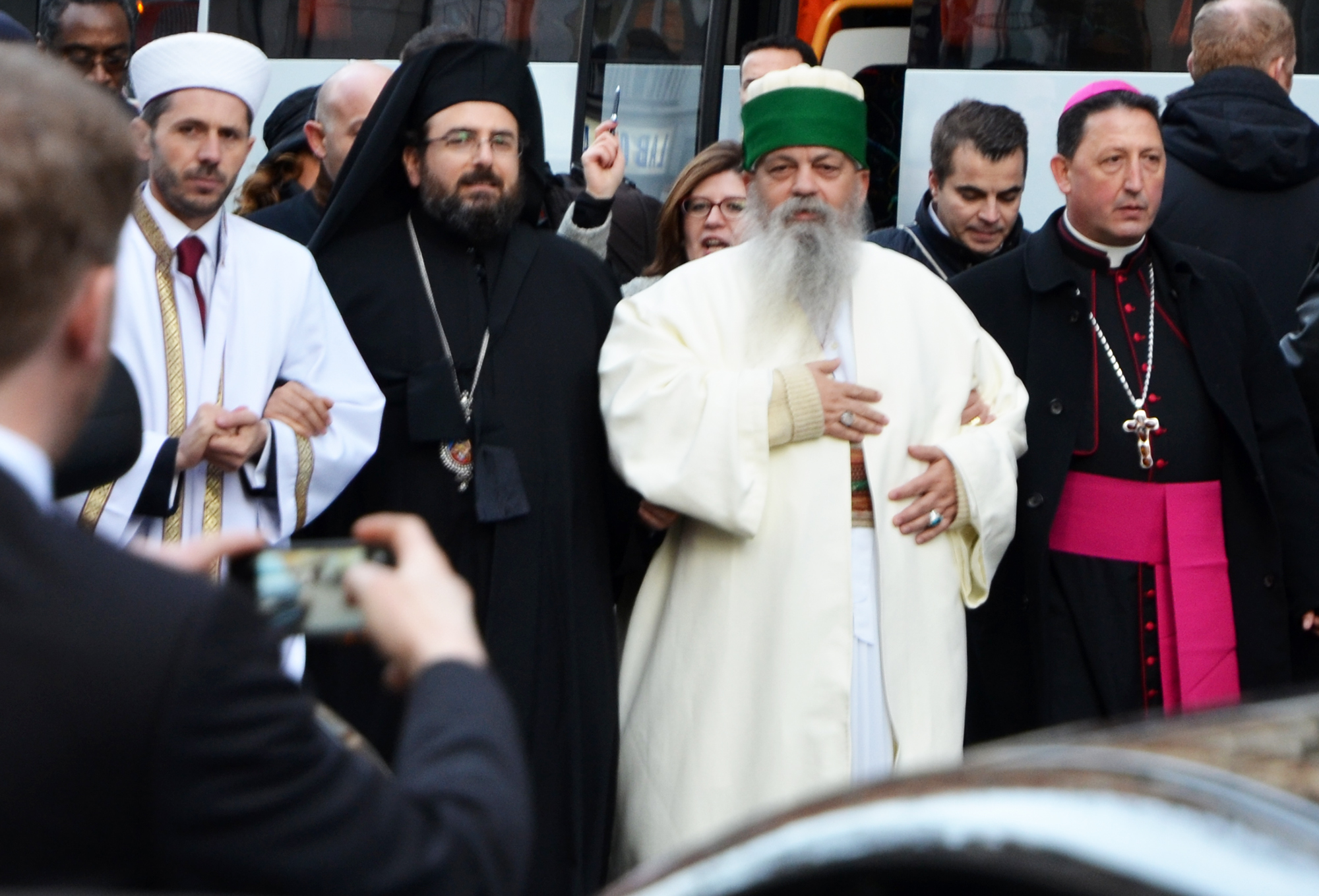
The leaders of Albania's four main denominations in Paris, France, in a demonstration for interfaith harmony, after the Charlie Hebdo attacks from 2015. From left to right: Sunni, Orthodox, Bektashi, and Catholic.

Despite occasional issues, Albania's "religious tolerance" (tolerance fetare) and "religious harmony" (harmonia fetare) are viewed as part of a set of distinctly Albanian national ideals, and said to serve an important part in Albania's civic framework where sectarian communities ideally set aside their difference and work together in the pursuit of national interest. Although considered a "national myth" by some, the "Albanian example" of interfaith tolerance and of tolerant laicism has been advocated as a model for the rest of the world by both Albanians and Western European and American commentators, including Pope Francis who praised Albania as a "model for a world witnessing conflict in God's name" and Prime Minister Edi Rama, who marched with Christian and Muslim clergy on either side in a demonstration in response to religious motivated violence in Paris. Meanwhile, Albania's "example" has also drawn interest recently in the West, where it has been used to argue that "religious freedom and Islamic values not only can co-exist, but also can flourish together", and is seen as a positive argument in favor of accelerating Albania's accession to the EU.

Interfaith marriages between Muslims and Christians are held to be "common" and "unremarkable" in Albania with little social repercussion, although there is little statistical data on their prevalence. During the communist period, it is known that during the period of 1950–1968, the rates of mixed marriages ranged from 1.6% in Shkodër, 4.3% in Gjirokastër to 15.5% among the textile workers in Tiranë. In the district of Shkodër they reached 5% in the year 1980. Most Albanian Muslims nowadays approve of mixed marriages, with 77% approving of a son marrying outside of the faith, and 75% for a daughter, the highest rates of all Muslim nationalities surveyed by Pew at the time. Meanwhile, 12% of Albanian Muslims agreed that "religious conflict is a big problem in Albania", though only 2% thought Christians were "hostile" to Muslims and 4% admitted that they thought Muslims were "hostile" to Christians. 79% of Albanian Muslims said all their close friends were also Muslim, the second lowest number (after Russia) in the survey.

== Religious observances, customs and culture ==
=== Holidays ===
In Albania, a series of religious celebrations are held by the Muslim community. Two recognised by the state as official holidays are: Bajrami i Madh (Big Bayram, Eid al-Fitr) celebrated at the conclusion of Ramadan and Kurban Bajram (Bayram of the sacrifice) or Bajrami i Vogël (Small Bayram, Eid al-Adha) celebrated on 10 Dhu al-Hijjah. During the month of Ramadan, practicing Sunni Muslims in Albania fast and 5 nights are held sacred and celebrated. These dates change per year as they follow the Muslim lunar calendar. In recent times during April, Muhammad's birthday is commemorated and the Muslim Community of Albania holds a concert in Tiranë. It is attended by Albanian political and Muslim religious establishment representatives alongside Albanian citizens, many non-practising Muslims. Other than the Sunni related celebrations, the Sufis such as the Bektashi have a series of holidays and observances. The Day of Sultan Novruz (Nowruz) on 22 March is an official holiday that celebrates the birth of Imam Ali. Ashura, a day commemorating the massacre at Karbala, is also held with multiple local festivals in various areas, some also observed as pilgrimages are held throughout the year at Sufi saints' tombs and shrines, like that of Sari Salltëk in Krujë. Most prominent of these is the pilgrimage on 20–25 August to Mount Tomorr to commemorate and celebrate the Shi'ite saint Abbas Ali.

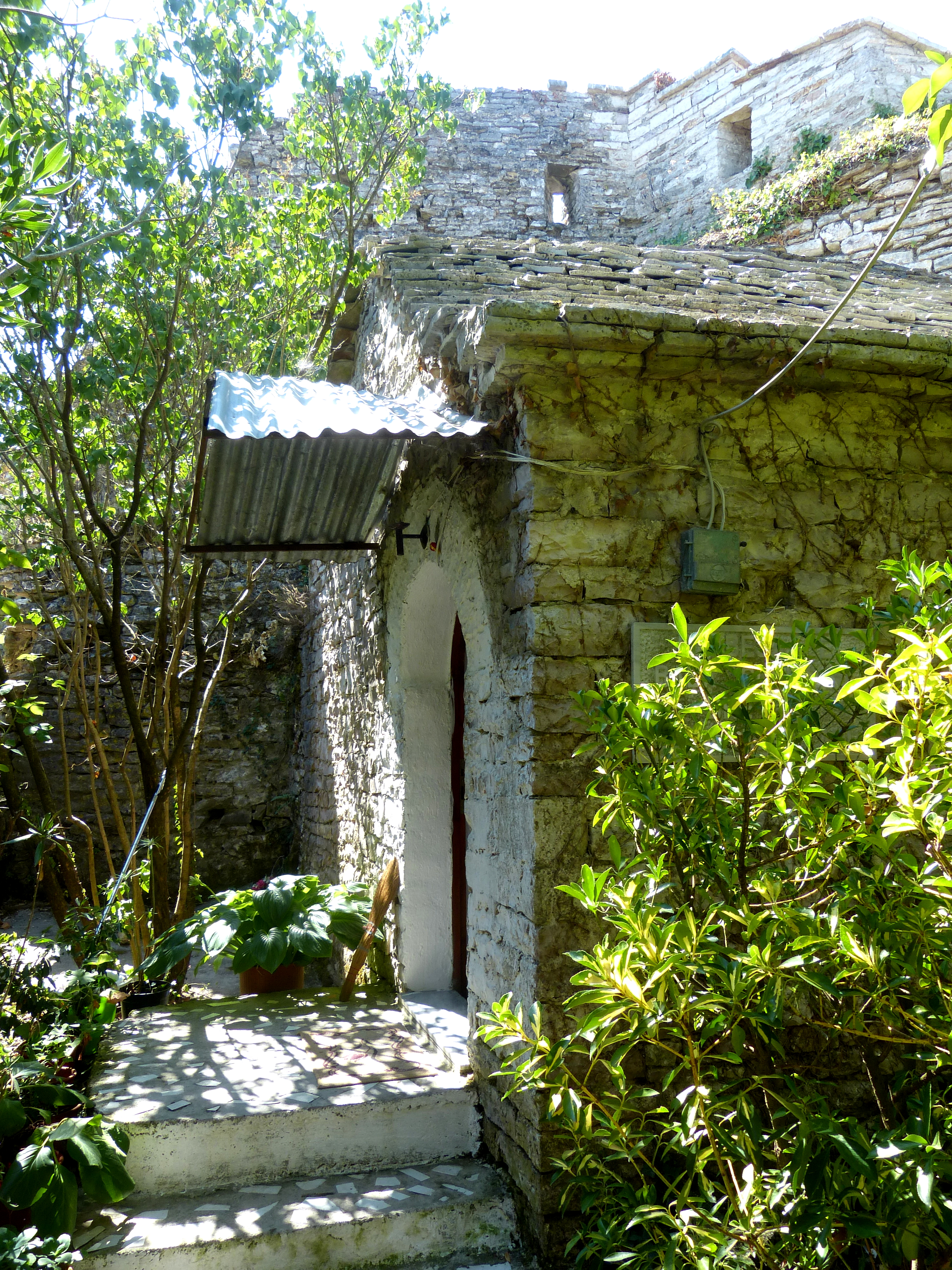
Sufi tyrbe within citadel of Gjirokastër.

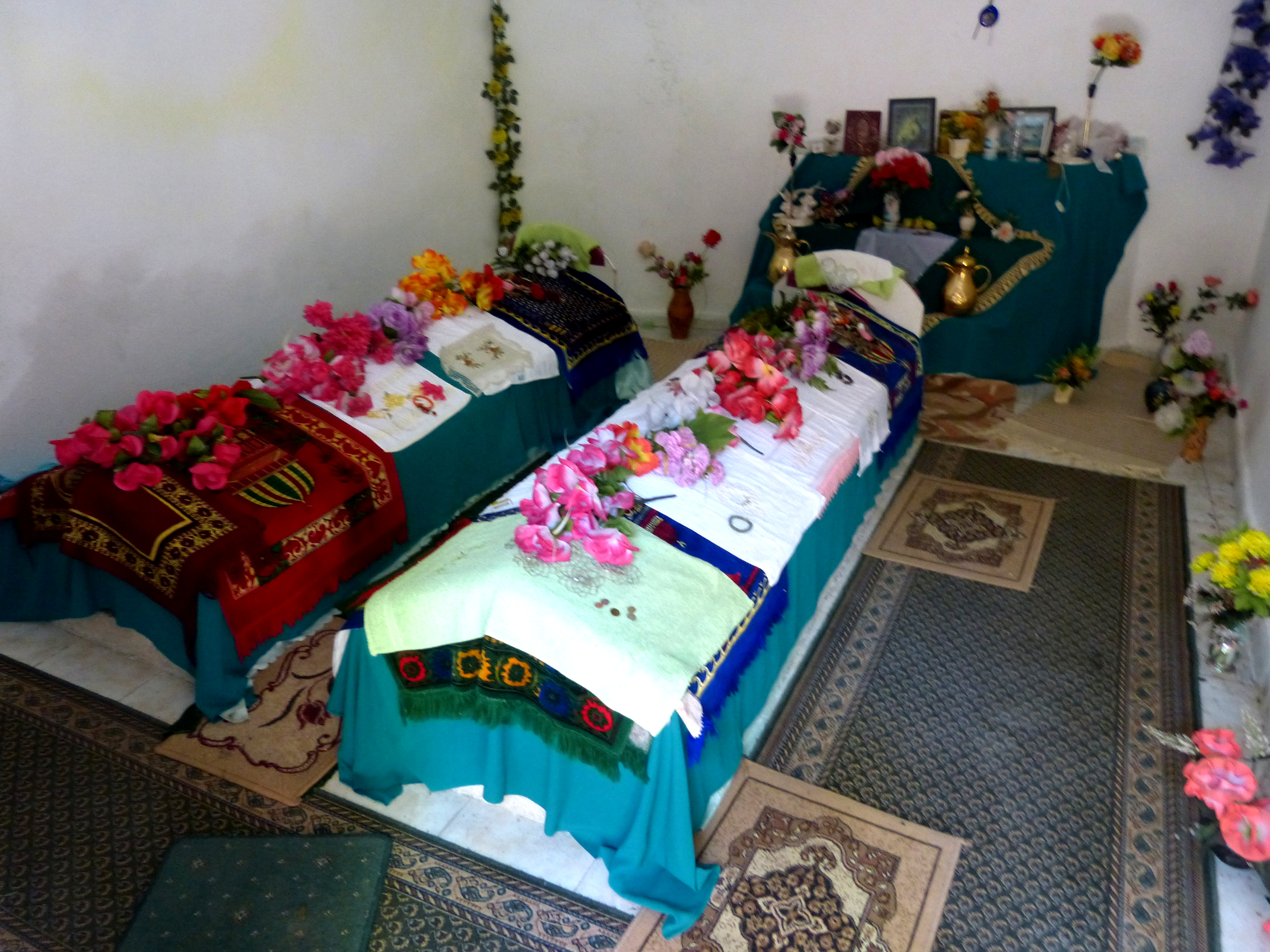
Interior of Gjirokastër tyrbe shrine with Sufi saints tombs.

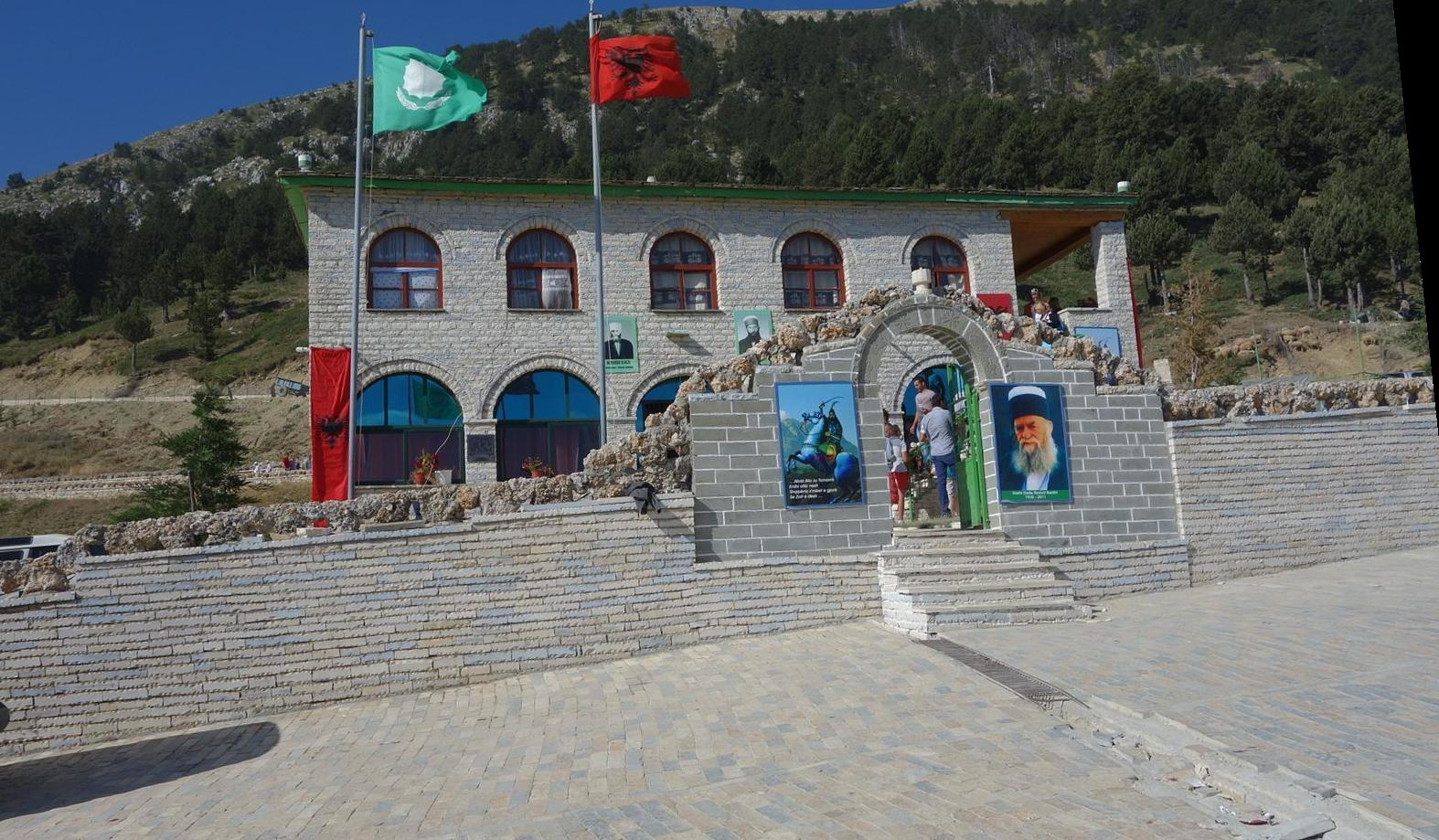
Abaz Ali teqe on Mount Tomorr.

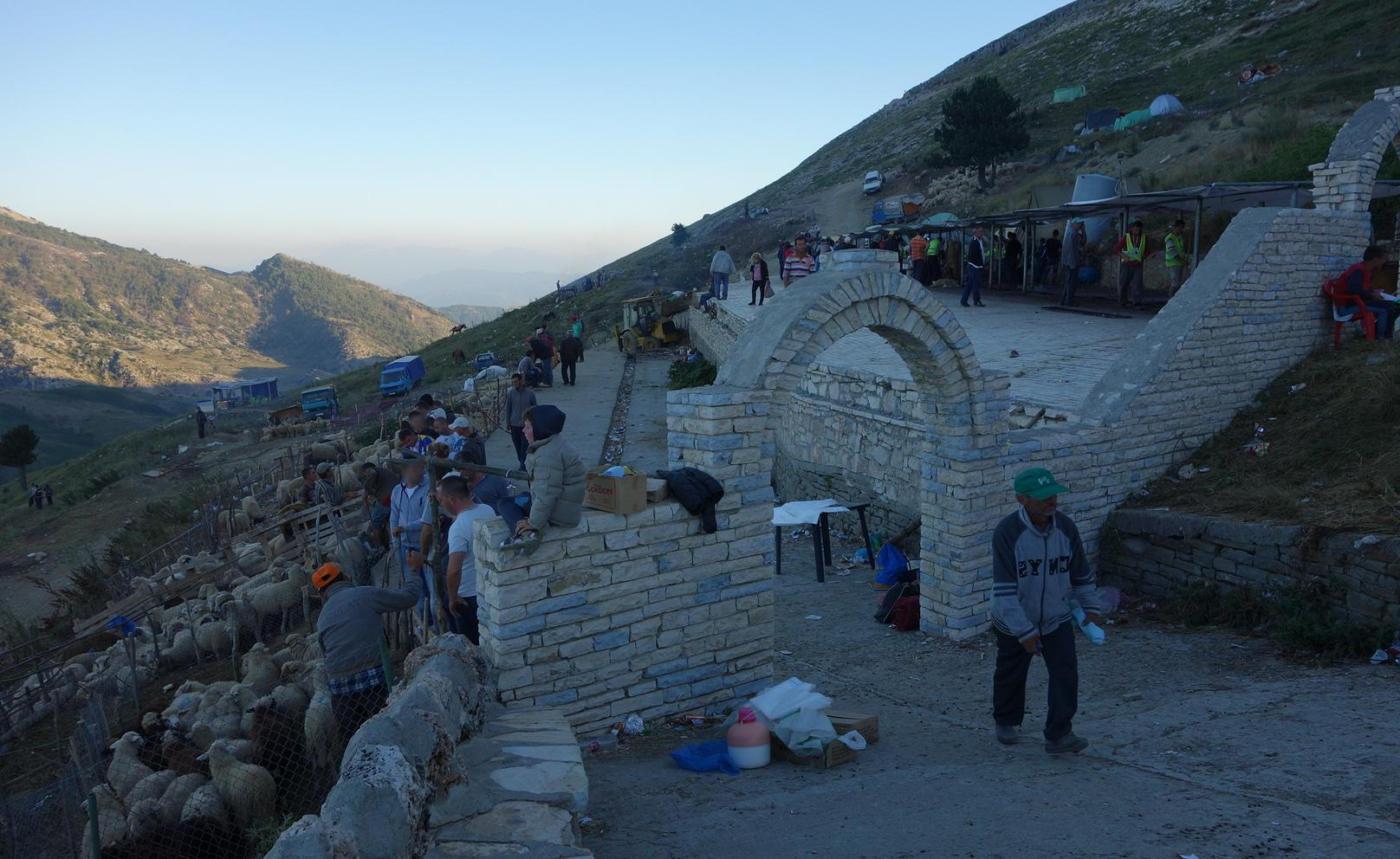
Pilgrims at Abaz Ali teqe on Mount Tomorr.

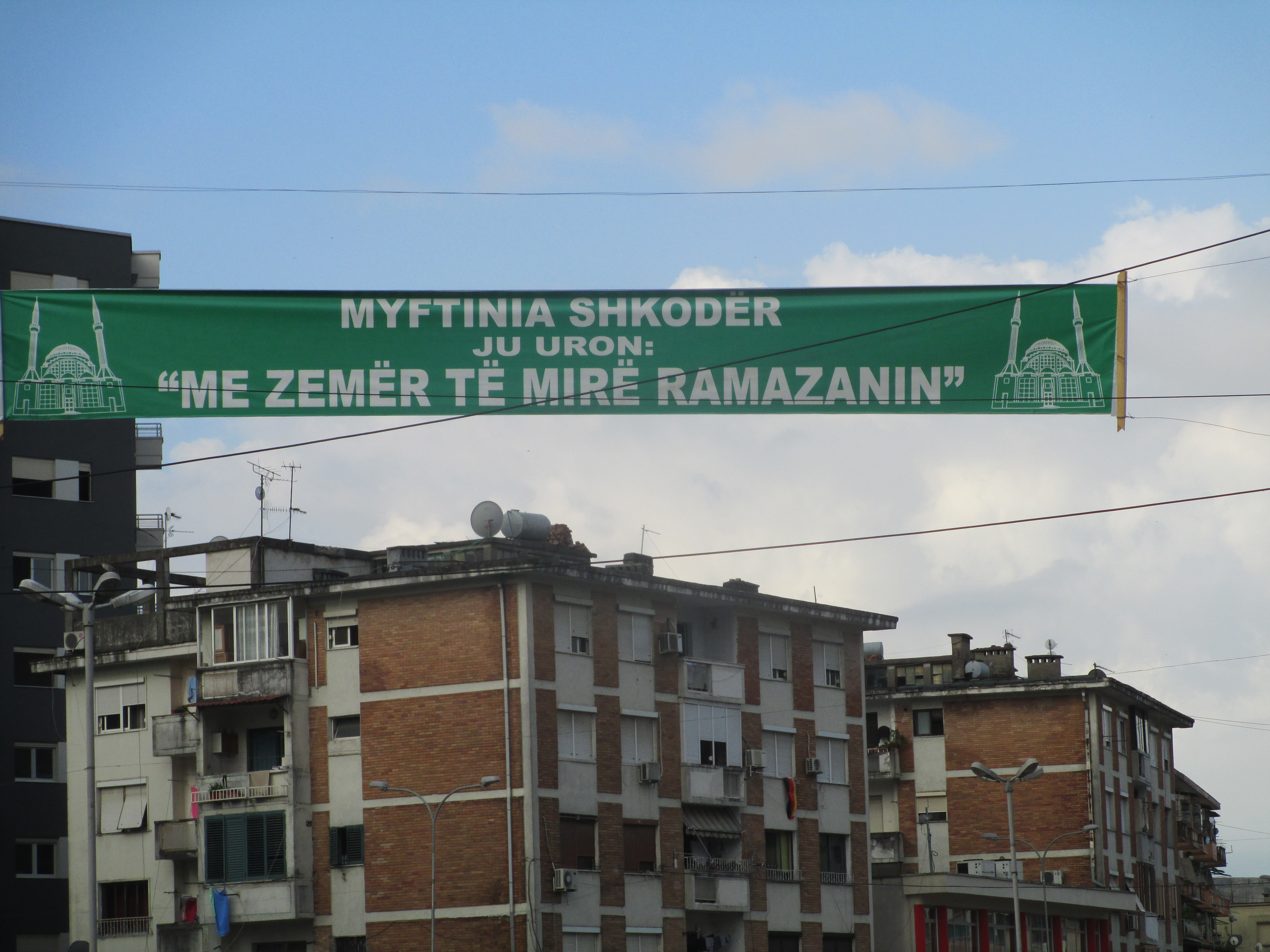
Banner hailing fasting month of Ramadan, Shkodër.

=== Food, dress, law and burials ===
In Albania, Halal slaughter of animals and food is permitted, mainly available in the eateries of large urban centres and becoming popular among people who are practicing Sunni Muslims. No centralised organisation exists for Halal certification of food which is unavailable in Albanian state institutions like schools, army, hospitals and so on, and people requesting Halal food in those places are usually sidelined. Muslim dress is not prohibited in Albania in public areas. Unofficial restrictions and regulations on religious clothing worn within public institutions in order to maintain the secular status of the state were upheld by principals of schools and others. Examples included within schools and universities whereby some young women wearing the hijab were expelled or told to remove it. These have eased especially after the Albanian government in 2011 backed away from proposed legislation that would have officially banned displays of religious symbols in schools. Religious Muslim law as with other religious law is not recognised by the Albanian courts. The Sunni Muslim Community of Albania however recognises nikah or religious Muslim marriage although not many people undertake marriage in this form. While chaplaincy though not officially recognised within state institutions, access to, religious advice and preaching in prisons is allowed to inmates while chaplains are banned in state schools. During the communist period, Muslim Albanians were buried alongside Albanians of other faiths and due to that legacy in contemporary times separate Muslim graveyards are uncommon.

== Extremism ==
Groups of ethnic Albanians were arrested by police in November 2016 in Kosovo, Albania and Macedonia for planning terrorist attacks. They were coordinated by IS commanders Lavdrim Muhaxheri and Ridvan Haqifi, both Kosovo Albanians, and planned attacks on international and state institutions, ultimately with the intent to establish an Islamic state. They planned to attack the Israeli football team during a match in Albania, and potentially Kosovo government institutions and Serbian Orthodox Church sites. A group of ethnic Albanians, Kosovo-born immigrants to Italy, were arrested by Italian police in Venice on 30 March 2017 for planning blowing up the Rialto Bridge.

== Controversies ==
=== Debates about Islam and contemporary Albanian identity ===
Within the Balkans apart from the ethno-linguistic component of Albanian identity, Albania's Orthodox neighbours also view it through religious terms. They refer to Albanians as a Muslim nation and as Muslim fundamentalists, which has placed the secular part of Albanian identity under strain.

Among Albanian intellectuals and other notable Albanians, many Muslim, this has generated much discussion and at times debates about Islam and its role within Albania and amongst Albanians as a whole in the Balkans. Within these discourses, controversial Orientalist and biological terminology has been used by some Albanian intellectuals when discussing Islam and Albanians.

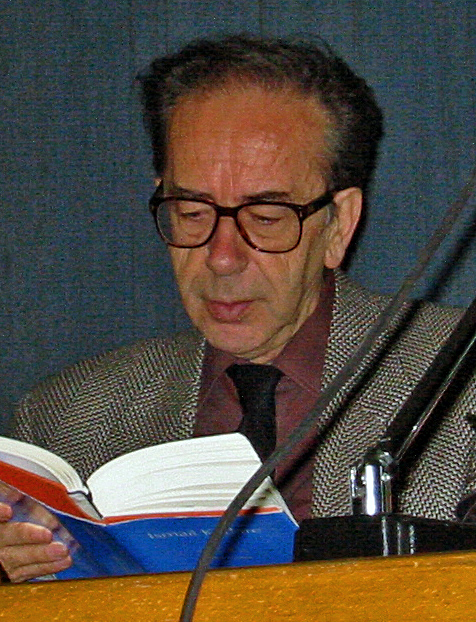
Ismail Kadare

Prominent in those discussions were written exchanges in newspaper articles and books between novelist Ismail Kadare of Gjirokastër and literary critic Rexhep Qosja, an Albanian from Kosovo in the mid-2000s. Kadare asserted that Albania's future lay with Europe due to its ancient European roots, Christian traditions, and being a white people, while Qosja contended that Albanian identity was both a blend of Western (Christian) and Eastern (Islam) cultures and often adaptable to historical contexts. In a 2005 speech given in Britain by president Alfred Moisiu of Orthodox heritage, he referred to Islam in Albania as having a "European face", it being "shallow" and that "if you dig a bit in every Albanian, he can discover his Christian core". The Muslim Forum of Albania called those and Kadare's comments "racist", and charged that they contained "Islamophobia" and were "deeply offensive". Following trends dating back from the Communist regime, the post-Communist Albanian political establishment continues to approach Islam as the faith of the Ottoman invader.

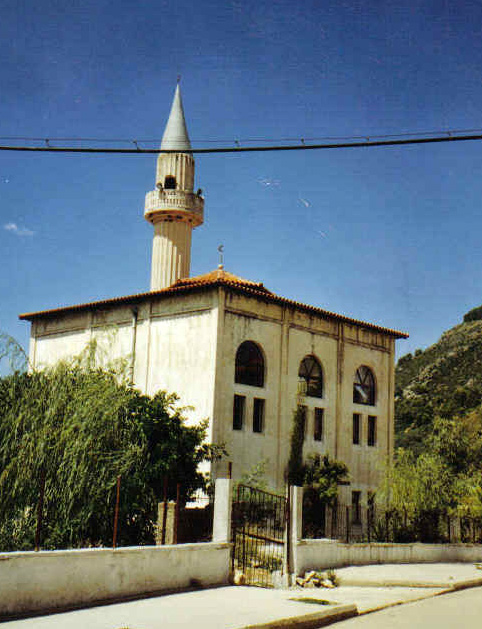
Mosque in Delvine

Islam and the Ottoman legacy has also been a topic of conversation among wider Albanian society. Islam and the Ottomans are viewed by many Albanians as the outcome of warfare, and Turkification and within those discourses Albania's sociopolitical problems are attributed as the outcome of that legacy. In debates over Albanian school textbooks where some historians have asked for offensive content regarding Turks to be removed, some Christian Albanian historians countered angrily by referring to negative experiences of the Ottoman period and wanting Turkey to seek redress for the invasion of Albania and Islamisation of Albanians. Some members of the Muslim community, while deemphasizing the Ottoman past, have responded to these views by criticizing what they say is prejudice toward Islam. Others, like academic Olsi Jazexhi, have added that contemporary Albanian politicians akin to the Communists perceive "Modernisation" to mean "De-Islamisation", making Muslim Albanians feel alienated from their Muslim traditions instead of celebrating them and embracing their Ottoman heritage. These views, however, are rare and often depicted as extremist in Albanian society.

Other debates, often in the media and occasionally heated, have been about public displays of Muslim practices, mosque construction in Albania, or local and international violent incidents and their relationship to Islam. Issues have also arisen over school textbooks and their inaccurate references of Islam such as describing Muhammad as God's "son", while other matters have been concerns over administrative delays for mosque construction and so on. Catholic and Orthodox Albanians hold concerns that any possible unification of Balkan areas populated by sizable numbers of Albanian Muslims to the country would lead to an increasing "Muslimization" of Albania. Muslim Albanians deemphasize the (Christian) religious heritage of two famous Albanian figures by viewing Skanderbeg as a defender of the nation, while Mother Teresa is acknowledged for her charitable works and both individuals are promoted as Albanian symbols of Europe and the West.

=== Discrimination ===
The school curriculum of Shkodra in northern Albania was criticized for diminishing the role of Muslims in the history of Albania. For example, "out of over 30 famous writers, historical gures, actors named in [a] textbook, there is only one Muslim in the entire list." Similarly, in 2014, Professor of Sociology at the University of Tirana Enis Sulstarova performed a comparative study of school textbooks finding that tenets of the Christian faith were often presented as a historical fact, while aspects of the Muslim faith were rendered a 'superstition.' The Deputy Chairman of the Albanian Muslim Community has accused the media in Albania of anti-Muslim bias, frequently calling individuals arrested as 'jihadists' and 'terrorists' before they have been sentenced and perpetuating a "clash of civilizations" narrative between Muslim Albanians and the rest of Europe. Legal experts noted a "violation of legal procedures, and the application of psychological pressure on [detainees] and family members with medical conditions" following the arrests of 150 people suspected of perpetrating the 2016 Balkans terrorism plot. The majority of those arrested had no connection to the incident and were promptly released, but authorities at the time "did not present arrest warrants" and questioned suspects without the presence of an attorney. On 7 August 2016, a Muslim woman wearing a headscarf was beaten on a bus and called a "terrorist."

=== Religious establishment views of Islam in Albania ===
The official religious Christian and Muslim establishments and their clergy hold diverging views of the Ottoman period and conversion of Islam by Albanians. Both Catholic and the Orthodox clergy interpret the Ottoman era as a repressive one that contained anti-Christian discrimination and violence, while Islam is viewed as foreign challenging Albanian tradition and cohesion. The conversion to Islam by Albanians is viewed by both Catholic and Orthodox clergy as falsification of Albanian identity, though Albanian Muslims are interpreted as innocent victims of Islamisation. Albanian Sunni Muslim clergy however views the conversion of Albanians as a voluntary process, while sidelining religious controversies associated with the Ottoman era. Sufi Islam in Albania interprets the Ottoman era as promoting a distorted form of Islam that was corrupted within a Sunni Ottoman polity that persecuted them. Christian clergy consider Muslim Albanians as part of the wider Albanian nation and Muslim clergy do not express derision to people who did not become Muslim in Albania. Christian identities in Albania have been forged on being in a minority position, at times with experiences of discrimination they have had historically in relation to the Muslim majority. Meanwhile, Muslim clergy in Albania highlight the change of fortune the demise of the Ottoman Empire brought with the political empowerment of Balkan Christians making Muslims a religious minority in contemporary times within the Balkans.

=== Conservative Islam and Muslim fundamentalism ===
The Muslim Albanian community has also contended with increasing numbers of Christian charities and missionaries proselytizing (especially those of the Orthodox working often in tandem with official Greek policies) which has made a part of the Sunni Albanian leadership become more assertive and calling for Islam to be declared the official religion of Albania. These calls within the scope of political Islam have greatly waned after non-Muslim Albanians objected to those suggestions. The Muslim Community of Albania opposes the legalisation of same-sex marriages for LGBT communities in Albania, as do the Orthodox and Catholic Church leaders of the country too. Muslim fundamentalism has though become a concern for Albania and its backers amongst the international community. In the 1990s, small groups of militant Muslims took advantage of dysfunctional government, porous borders, corruption, weak laws and illegal activities occurring during Albania's transition to democracy. These Muslim militants used Albania as a base for money laundering and as a transit route into the West with at times the assistance of corrupt government employees. There were claims by critics of the Albanian government that high-profile militants like Osama bin Laden passed through Albania while president Sali Berisha and head of Albanian intelligence Bashkim Gazidede had knowledge and assisted militants, though no credible evidence has emerged. Salafi and Wahhabi forms of Islam have also entered Albania and adherents have come mainly from among the young. As of March 2016, some 100 or so Albanians so far have left Albania to become foreign fighters by joining various fundamentalist Salafi jihadist groups involved in the ongoing civil wars of Syria and Iraq; 18 have died. In response to these events the Albanian government has cracked down with arrests of people associated with the few mosques suspected of radicalisation and recruitment.

=== Islam and Albanian geopolitical orientation ===
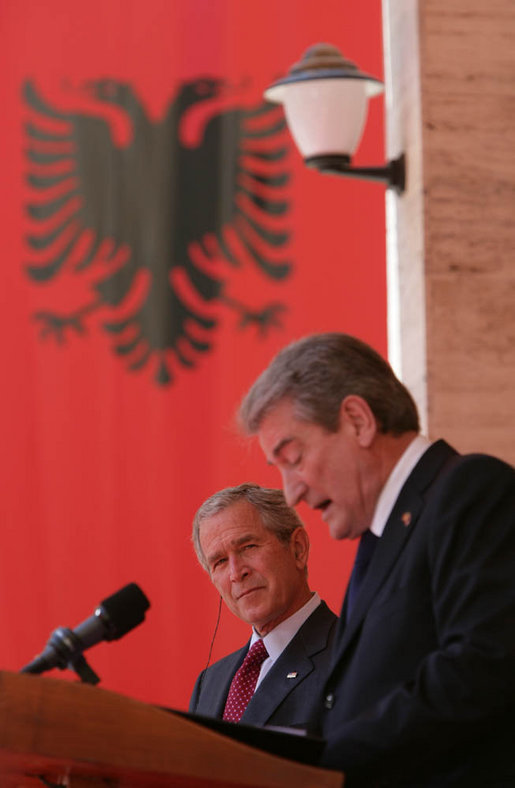
US president George W. Bush and Albanian prime minister Sali Berisha during a joint press conference in Tiranë, Albania (2007)

With the collapse of the isolationist communist regime, Albania's geopolitical orientation between West and East and the role of Christianity and Islam became debated among Albanian intellectuals and its politicians. Within the context of nationalist discourses during the 1990s the governing Albanian Democratic Party regarding European aspirations stressed aspects of Catholicism and as some government members were Muslims made overtures to Islam to join international organisations like the Organisation of Islamic Cooperation (OIC). In 1992 Albania became the only entirely European member of the OIC, generating intense controversy within Albania due to concerns that Albania might deviate from a secular and Western-aligned political direction. The Albanian government viewed membership in the OIC as being a bridge between the Muslim-Christian worlds and also as having a "civilising mission" role within the Islamic world due to the Western orientation of Albania. The government of Sali Berisha in the 1990s generated a Muslim network in Albania which was dismantled by Socialist Party (organizational heirs of the ultra-secularist Communists) when it came to power in 1997. By 1998–99 Albania's OIC membership was suspended and temporarily withdrawn by prime-minister Fatos Nano who viewed it as inhibiting Albania's European aspirations. In the post communist period different socio-political reactions have occurred by regional neighbours and international powers toward Albania and Muslim Albanians. For example, in the 1990s, Greece preferred and assisted Orthodox Albanian leaders like Fatos Nano in Albania over Muslim Albanian ones like Sali Berisha as they were seen as being friendlier to Greek interests. During the Kosovo crisis (1998–1999), the Albanian political establishment was concerned with Western public opinion viewing Albanians as "Islamic" due to Serbian government claims portraying the Kosovo Liberation Army (KLA) as interested in creating a Balkan Islamic state.

In a post-communist environment, Albania emerged as being generally supportive of the US. During the Kosovo War (1999) and ethnic cleansing of mostly Muslim Albanians by Orthodox Serbs alongside the subsequent refugee influx into the country, Albania's status as an ally of the US was confirmed. Support for the USA has remained high at 95% in Muslim majority Albania in contrast to the rest of the Islamic world. Albania joined the NATO military alliance in 2009 which remains popular in the country especially due to its intervention in the Kosovo war and Albania has contributed troops to NATO led operations in Afghanistan. Within the wider Balkans Albania is considered to be the most pro-EU and pro-Western country in the region and, unlike its neighbours (except Kosovo), it has little to negligible support for Russia. Albania is an aspirant for European Union membership after formally submitting its application to join in 2009. Sentiments among the EU exist of viewing Albania as a mainly Muslim country cause concerns for the Albanian political establishment who promote an image of Western orientation for Euro-Atlantic integration, especially when overt displays of Muslim practice arise such as dress or rituals. State relations of Albania with Turkey are friendly and close, due to maintenance of close links with the Albanian diaspora in Turkey and strong Turkish sociopolitical, cultural, economic and military ties with Albania. Turkey has been supportive of Albanian geopolitical interests within the Balkans. In Gallup polls conducted in recent times Turkey is viewed as a friendly country by 73% of people in Albania. Albania has established political and economic ties with Arab countries, in particular with Arab Persian Gulf states who have heavily invested in religious, transport and other infrastructure alongside other facets of the economy in addition to the somewhat limited societal links they share. Albania is also working to develop socio-political and economic ties with Israel.

== See also ==
- Islamization of Albania
- Muslim Community of Albania
- Bektashi Order
- Bektashism and folk religion
- History of Ottoman Albania
- Religion in Albania
- Christianity in Albania
- Secularism in Albania
- Roman Catholicism in Albania
- Orthodoxy in Albania
- Protestantism in Albania
- Irreligion in Albania
- Judaism in Albania
