= Dolno Sedlarce =

Dolno Sedlarce Долно Седларце
- Village
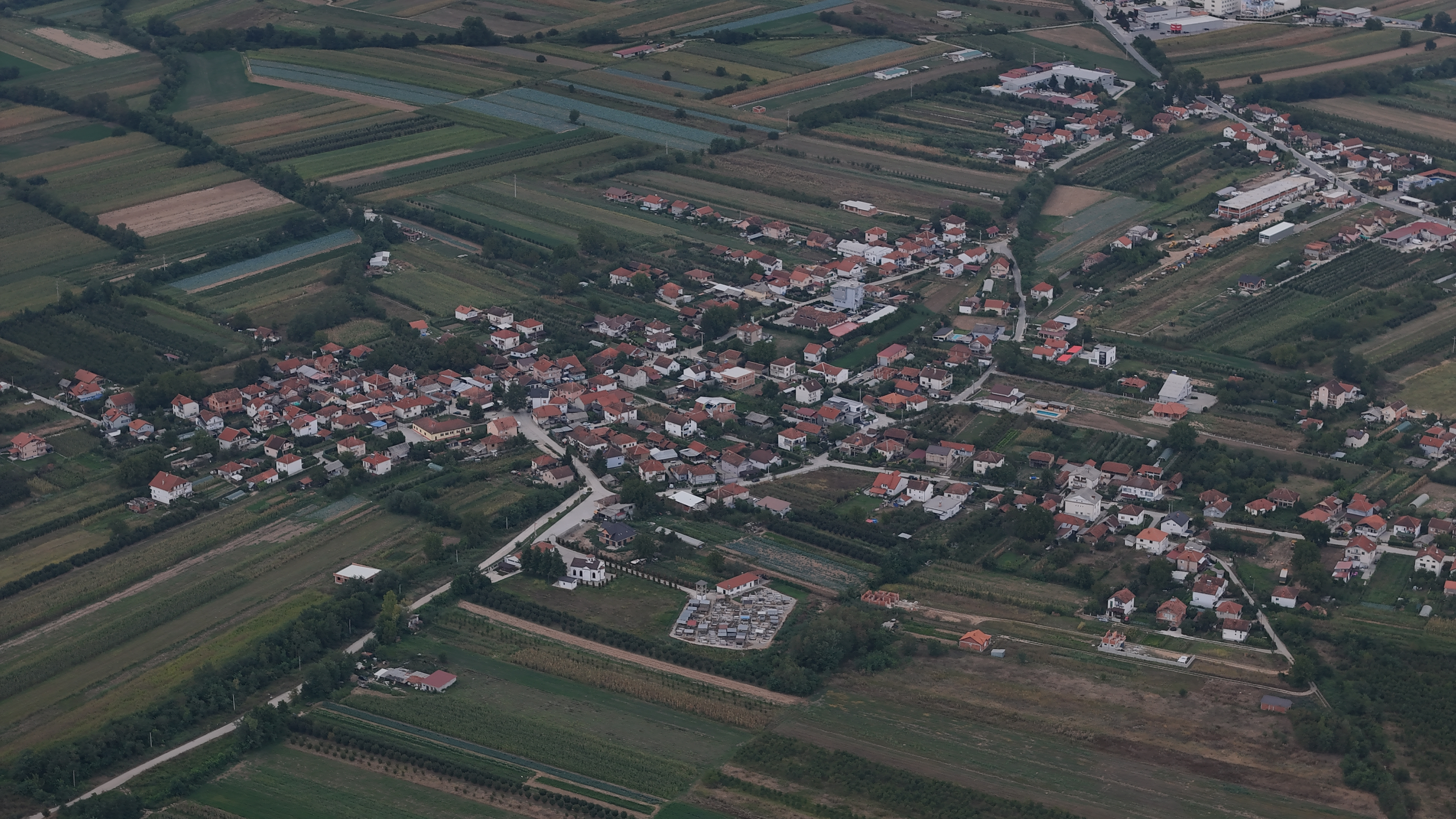
- Air view of the village

- Location within North Macedonia
- Coordinates: 41.935663°N 20.944136°E
- Country: North Macedonia
- Region: Polog
- Municipality: Brvenica

Population (2021)
  - Total: 805
- Time zone: UTC+1 (CET)
  - Summer (DST): UTC+2 (CEST)
- Website: .

Dolno Sedlarce (Macedonian: Долно Седларце) is a village in the municipality of Brvenica, North Macedonia.

== Demographics ==
Dolno Sedlarce is attested in the 1467/68 Ottoman tax registry (defter) for the Nahiyah of Kalkandelen. The village had a total of 26 Christian households and two bachelors.

As of the 2021 census, Dolno Sedlarce had 805 residents with the following ethnic composition:

- Macedonians 778
- Persons for whom data are taken from administrative sources 19
- Others 8

According to the 2002 census, the village had a total of 693 inhabitants. Ethnic groups in the village include:

- Macedonians 690
- Serbs 3

According to the 1942 Albanian census, Dolno Sedlarce was inhabited by 16 Serbs, 175 Bulgarians and 42 Muslim Albanians.

In statistics gathered by Vasil Kanchov in 1900, the village of Dolno Sedlarce (Sedlarci Dolno) was inhabited by 40 Christian Bulgarians.
