= 2016 Balkans terrorism plot =

Planned terrorist plots

- Location: Kosovo; Macedonia; Albania
- Date: 12 November 2016
- Target: international and state institutions in Albania, Kosovo and Macedonia
- Attack type: Terror plot
- No. of participants: 25

According to Kosovan police, simultaneous attacks planned in Albania, Kosovo and Macedonia were thwarted in November 2016. Nineteen people were arrested in Kosovo, and six more in Albania and Macedonia, for a total of twenty five arrests. Explosives, weapons, electronic equipment, and material related to extremist religious groups were seized during the raids following the arrests.

The suspects, planning "synchronized terror attacks," were receiving orders from Islamic State member Lavdrim Muhaxheri. Between 4 and 16 November 2016, eighteen Kosovo Albanians and one Macedonian Albanian were arrested suspected of planning terrorist attacks in Kosovo and Albania. They were coordinated by Muhaxheri and fellow IS fighter Ridvan Haqifi. According to the prosecution, the terrorist group planned attacks on international and state institutions, ultimately with the intent to establish an Islamic state. Media reports state that Kosovo government institutions and Serbian Orthodox Church sites were potential targets. Among the planned targets were the Israel national football team and their supporters during the Albania–Israel World Cup qualifying match.

In February 2017, Albania announced that it would join the counter-Islamic State efforts, and send troops to Iraq. This was Albania's first active involvement in the fighting against ISIS.
