= Namazgah Mosque =

Largest mosque in the Balkans, located in Tirana, Albania

- Xhamia e Namazgjasë
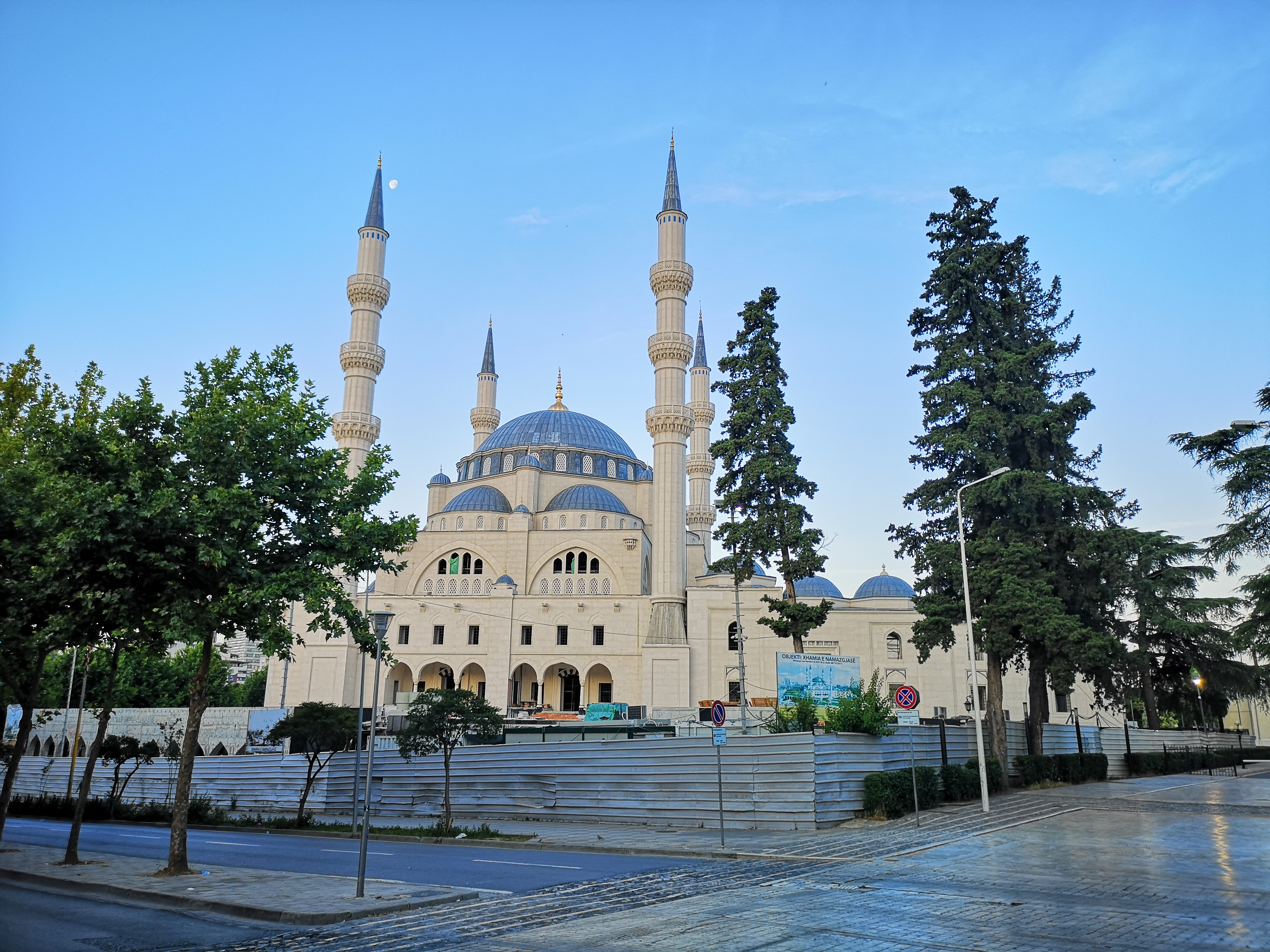
- The mosque during construction

- Location of the mosque in Albania

Religion
- Affiliation: Sunni Islam
- Ecclesiastical or organisational status: Mosque
- Ownership: Albanian Muslim Community
- Status: Active

Location
- Location: Tirana city
- Country: Albania
- Interactive map of Namazgah Mosque
- Coordinates: 41°19′32″N 19°49′27″E

Architecture
- Type: Mosque architecture
- Style: Classical Ottoman
- Funded by: Presidency of Religious Affairs, Turkey
- Groundbreaking: 2015
- Completed: 2024
- Construction cost: 30 million euros

Specifications
- Capacity: 8,000 inside; 2,000 outside; 10,000 worshippers total
- Dome: One
- Dome height (outer): 30 m (98 ft)
- Minaret: Four
- Minaret height: 50 m (160 ft)
- Site area: 10,000 m^{2} (110,000 sq ft)

Website
- tiranagrandmosque.com

The Namazgah Mosque (Albanian: Xhamia e Namazgjasë, lit. 'Mosque of the Prayer Square'), also known as the Great Mosque of Tirana (Xhamia e Madhe e Tiranës), is a Sunni mosque, located in Tirana, Albania. With a capacity of 10,000 worshippers, it is the largest mosque in the Balkans (excluding East Thrace).

== History ==
Even after the fall of communism in Albania, in 1991, Muslim Albanians often complained about being discriminated against. While an Eastern Orthodox and Roman Catholic cathedrals were built, Albanian Muslims had no central mosque and had to pray in the streets until 2016. In 1992, the then president, Sali Berisha, laid the first stone of the mosque to be constructed near Namazgah Square, close to the Albanian parliament. Construction was delayed after the speaker of parliament, Pjetër Arbnori, a Catholic, contested the plans.

The decision to build the mosque was taken in 2010, by the mayor of Tirana, Edi Rama, and the mosque was considered necessary because there were only eight mosques in the city, down from 28 in 1967, due to destruction during the communist era. During Islamic holidays, the Skanderbeg Square was filled with Muslim worshipers, because the Ottoman-era Et'hem Bey Mosque, at the time Tirana's principal mosque, had a capacity of only 60 persons. Rain made Friday sermons impossible.

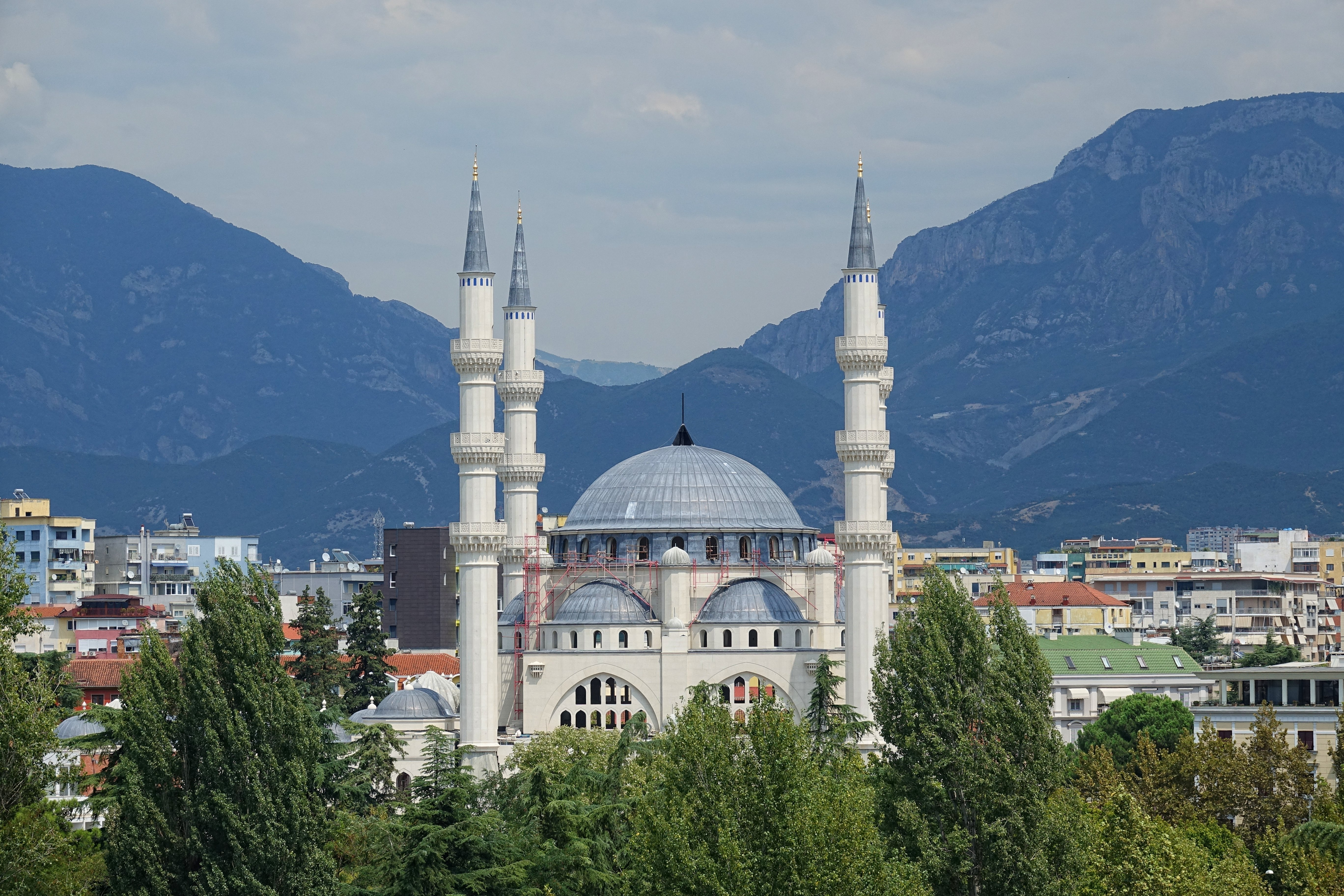
As seen from the top of the Pyramid of Tirana

Construction of the new mosque was launched in 2015 with the financing of 30 million euros, partly coming from the Diyanet of Turkey. In 2015, Turkish president Recep Tayyip Erdoğan visited Albania for the inauguration ceremony of the mosque.

The mosque was officially opened on 10 October 2024, in a ceremony at which Erdoğan and the former mayor, then Albanian prime minister, Rama, delivered speeches. It was expected that the new mosque would increase tourism and the new mosque replaced the Et'hem Bey Mosque as the main mosque for the city.

== Architecture ==
The mosque's design was inspired by Classical Ottoman architecture. It has four minarets, each 50 metres (160 ft) high, while the central dome has a height of 30 metres (98 ft). The first floor of the mosque includes a cultural center and other facilities. The mosque was constructed on a 10,000-square-metre (110,000 sq ft) parcel of land near Albania's parliament building. It has a capacity for up to 8,000 people to pray inside the mosque and 2,000 on the outside; or 10,000 worshippers in total.

== See also ==
- Islam in Albania
- List of mosques in Albania
