= Ridvan Haqifi =

Kosovo Albanian Islamic State (IS) leader

Ridvan Haqifi (1990 – 8 February 2017), also known by the nom de guerre Abu Muqatil al-Kosovo, was a Kosovo Albanian Islamic State (IS) leader and recruiter of ethnic Albanian jihadi foreign fighters fighting in Syria and in Iraq. He was born in Bukovik, Gjilan, Kosovo. He was a close associate with fellow Kosovo Albanian Lavdrim Muhaxheri. Both Haqifi and Muhaxheri were proteges of radical Kosovar Imam Zekerija Qazimi, who was found guilty and jailed for ten years in May 2016. Haqifi stood beside Muhaxheri and other ethnic Albanian mujahideen in the ISIS propaganda film in which they called Albanians to join their fight and then burnt their passports. His two brothers (one named Irfan Haqifi) also fought in Syria. He was killed by an airstrike on 8 February 2017.

Between 4 and 16 November 2016, eighteen Kosovo Albanians and one Macedonian Albanian were arrested suspected of planning terrorist attacks in Kosovo and Albania. They were coordinated by Muhaxheri and Haqifi. According to the prosecution, the terrorist group planned attacks on international and state institutions, ultimately with the intent to establish an Islamic state. They planned to attack the Israeli football team during a match in Albania. Media reports state that Kosovo government institutions were potential targets.
