= Lavdrim Muhaxheri =

Kosovar Albanian jihadist

- Image from Interpol wanted profile
- Born: 12 March 1989; Kačanik, Yugoslavia (now Kosovo)
- Died: 8 June 2017 (aged 28); Syria
- Other names: Abu Abdullah al Kosova; Abu Abdallah al-Kosovi
- Military career
- Allegiance: NATO (2010–12) al-Nusra Front (late 2012); Islamic State (2013–2017)
- Unit: ethnic Albanian mujahideen
- Military conflicts: Syrian Civil War; Iraqi Civil War

Lavdrim Muhaxheri (/ˌmuːhəˈdʒɛri/; 12 March 1989 – 8 June 2017), also known by the nom de guerre Abu Abdullah al Kosova, was a Kosovar Albanian Islamic State (IS) leader and recruiter of jihadi foreign fighters fighting in Syria and in Iraq. A former KFOR and NATO employee, he became an extremist and left for Syria in late 2012. He appeared in several propaganda videos, calling Albanians to join jihad, and uploaded photographs of himself appearing to decapitate a man, as well as a video where he kills a captive with a rocket. On 24 September 2014, the U.S. Department of State designated Muhaxheri as a global terrorist.

On 8 June 2017, without providing further details, Muhaxheri's death was announced by his family and police in Kosovo. He was allegedly killed in a U.S. airstrike.

== Early life ==
Lavdrim Muhaxheri, a Kosovo Albanian Muslim, was born on 12 March 1989 (according to Interpol) or 3 December 1989 or ca. 1987 (according to UN) in Kačanik, SFR Yugoslavia. Muhaxheri grew up during the Kosovo War (1998–99). He worked at Kosovo Force (KFOR) camp "Camp Bondsteel" in Ferizaj until 2010, when he was promoted to a NATO training camp in Afghanistan.

Muhaxheri served with NATO at a training camp in Afghanistan between 2010 and 2012, then returned to Kosovo. In late 2012, he became associated with extremist Islamist associations, first with a local organization, "Parimi", which then established the Islamic Youth-Kaçanik organization, in which he was appointed emir (military leader). The organization was formed within the Islamic Community of Kosova (ICK). His friends told media that he had not been radical prior to joining the Islamist associations. Muhaxheri claimed in Facebook posts at the time that he controlled the appointment of the imam at the Kaçanik Mosque, the center of a conflict between radicals and traditional locals. He also threatened to kill people who criticized Kosovo Albanians going to Syria to fight.

== Militant activity ==
Arriving in Syria in late 2012, he joined the Syrian Civil War as a mujahid and became a leader of a unit of ethnic Albanian mujahideen, connected to the al-Nusra Front. He returned to Kosovo in 2013, and was present at the 2013 Ramadan festival, as part of the Islamic Community of Kosova, in Kačanik, as evidenced by photographs. He then returned to Syria the same year, becoming a mujahideen leader of the Islamic State of Iraq and the Levant (ISIL, or IS), directly reporting to IS caliph Abu al-Baghdadi, leading a platoon of ethnic Albanian fighters. Muhaxheri was a link between the IS and ethnic Albanians in Albania, Kosovo, and Macedonia. Some 500 ethnic Albanians from the Western Balkans fight for the IS, out of whom 232 are from Kosovo (May 2015). Muhaxheri was described as an "intelligent and an experienced military strategist".

In October 2013, Muhaxheri appeared in a video calling Albanians to join their fight. In the IS propaganda film Clanging of the Swords IV, he is seen alongside other Albanians from Albania, Macedonia, Kosovo, brandishing a sword and then destroying their passports. The film, posted on 17 May 2014, is an "extremely violent hour-long film", whose "production style is reminiscent of Hollywood blockbusters".

On 29 July 2014, Muhaxheri uploaded photos to a Facebook page where he is seen beheading an unidentified young man in Syria. In an interview with the Albanian daily "Dita", posted on 2 August 2014, Muhaxheri said that the man was a 19-year-old spy, and that he had acted according to the Quran. On 15 August 2014, Interpol received an international warrant request from Kosovo authorities.

On 18 August 2014, Iraqi Kurdish media channel KNNC reported that Muhaxheri had been killed and published photos allegedly showing his dead body. Muhaxheri's friend denied the claims of his death, while Muhaxheri's Facebook page was deleted, leading to speculations whether Muhaxheri was alive. In late August, Kosovo authorities arrested forty citizens suspected of engaging in the conflicts in Syria and Iraq, including several imams within the Islamic Community of Kosova, in an effort to suppress radical Islamism and Wahhabism. Muhaxheri's actions prompted a new law prohibiting the teaching of Wahhabism in Kosovo. On 24 September 2014, the U.S. Department of State designated Muhaxheri a global terrorist.

In another video published by activist group Raqqa is Being Slaughtered Silently (RSS) on 21 May 2015, Lavdrim Muhaxheri is seen firing a rocket-propelled grenade (RPG) at a captive in Syria. It is unclear if it is a new or old video; a RSS activist believed it to be new, while an Albanian researcher questioned that it was a new video that proved he was still alive, while another analyst said it was at least newer than August 2014. In the video, Muhaxheri interrogates the captive, who says that he had killed two IS fighters with a RPG; Muhaxheri condemns the captive to death by RPG as well.

Muhaxheri was last reported to be in Syria in 2015. On 29 August 2015, an IS propaganda video promoting the new currency was published, in which Muhaxheri is seen handling golden coins (dinars). Several ethnic Albanian jihadists living in Italy, with connections to Muhaxheri, were arrested by Italian police in November 2015. On 29 December 2015 it was reported that he was in Iraq, according to photographs posted on Twitter.

Between 4 and 16 November 2016, eighteen Kosovo Albanians and one Macedonian Albanian were arrested suspected of planning terrorist attacks in Kosovo and Albania. They were coordinated by Muhaxheri and fellow IS fighter Ridvan Haqifi. According to the prosecution, the terrorist group planned attacks on international and state institutions, ultimately with the intent to establish an Islamic state. They planned to attack the Israeli football team during a match in Albania.

== Death ==
On 8 June 2017, Kosovo police and his family said that Muhaxheri was killed in Syria without providing further details. According to local media reports, citing Kosovar Interior Ministry sources, it was indicated that he was killed in a U.S airstrike close to the ISIL capital city of Raqqa.

== Annotations ==
1. Quoting the press release: "Lavdrim Muhaxheri is a Kosovar Albanian foreign fighter for ISIL who operates in both Syria and Iraq. Muhaxheri made international headlines in July 2014 after uploading to Facebook graphic photos of himself beheading a young man." The State Department and Treasury Department imposed financial sanctions, freezing assets and blocking financial transactions for "Islamist fighters" including Muhaxheri. On 2 October 2014, a statement on Muhaxheri by U.S. Secretary of State John Kerry dated 17 September 2014 was published in the Federal Register wherein Muhaxheri was described as a threat to U.S. national security and, thereby, "blacklisted" from the United States.

== Sources ==
- Likmeta, Besar; Zogjani, Nektar (31 July 2014). "Jihadist's Beheading Photos Shock Kosovo". News. Balkan Insight.
