= Haxhi =

- Gender: Male

Origin
- Region of origin: Albania, Kosovo

Haxhi is an Albanian masculine given name that derives from the muslim title Hajji, and may refer to:

- Haxhi Ballgjini (born 1958), Albanian footballer
- Haxhi Isuf Banka (1864–1944), Albanian economist and politician
- Haxhi Faik Hoxha (1930–2011), Albanian Imam, Alim, Mufti and educationist
- Haxhi Ymer Kashari (fl. 18th-century), Albanian poet
- Haxhi Krasniqi (a.k.a. Robin Krasniqi; born 1987), Kosovar-German boxer
- Haxhi Lleshi (1913–1998), Albanian military leader and politician
- Haxhi Neziraj (born 1993), Albanian footballer
- Haxhi Qamili (1876–1915), Albanian leader of an egalitarian, pan-Ottoman and an Islamic revolt
- Haxhi Xhaferr Shkodra (1931–2016), Albanian religious leader
- Haxhi Zeka (1832-1902), Albanian nationalist leader
