= Firdeusi Institute =

Seal of Firdeusi Institute for Persian Studies

The Firdeusi Institute for Iranian and Persian Studies is an Albanian non-for-profit and non-governmental organisation established by Marin Barleti University and the Saadi Shirazi Cultural Foundation on October 6, 2010. The launch ceremony was held on 29 October 2010. It is the first research institute for Persian studies in Albania at the university level.

The institute is named after the famous Persian writer Abul-Kasim Hasan Pur-Ali Tusi Ferdowsi (or Firdeusi). The choice was also a tribute to the “Ferdowsi Shahnameh Millenium” proclaimed by UNESCO in 2010. The institute's logo, which represents an open book, was inspired by the poet's name and is interwoven with calligraphy elements from the Persian language.

== Persian studies in Albania ==
The diffusion of Persian literature and culture in Albania is closely linked to the presence of the Ottoman Empire, because of the influence Persian culture exerted on the Ottoman administration and Turkish culture of the era. Another key factor in the popularisation of Persian culture among Albanians is the expansion of Islam in the territories lived in by Albanians during the 16th and 17th centuries. In the 19th century, the Persian language was widely used among Albanian intellectuals.

Naim and Sami Frashëri were among the most prominent scholars of oriental and Iranian studies in Albania. Naim Frashëri published two books in Persian: the first, Grammar of the Persian Language was published in 1871, while Tehajjulat, a compilation of poems in Persian, was published in 1885. These formed the cornerstone of Persian literature and culture studies in Albania.

Other Iran scholars in Albania include: Vexhi Buharaja, who translated many Persian books into Albanian, such as Gjylistani dhe Bostani, 3500 verses from Shahname, and so on; Tahir Dizdari, author of Persian words in the Albanian language; Hafiz Ali Korca; Fan Noli, with his translation of Omar Khajam's famous quatrains; Dalan Shapllo, scholar, writer and translator of Hafiz Shirazi's mystical poems; and many more contemporary Albanian linguists, scholars and writers.

== See also ==
- Academy of Persian Language and Literature
- International rankings of Iran
- Persia
- Iranian studies
