= King Zog (statue) =

Statue in Tirana, Albania

King Zog statue
- Statuja e Mbretit Zog
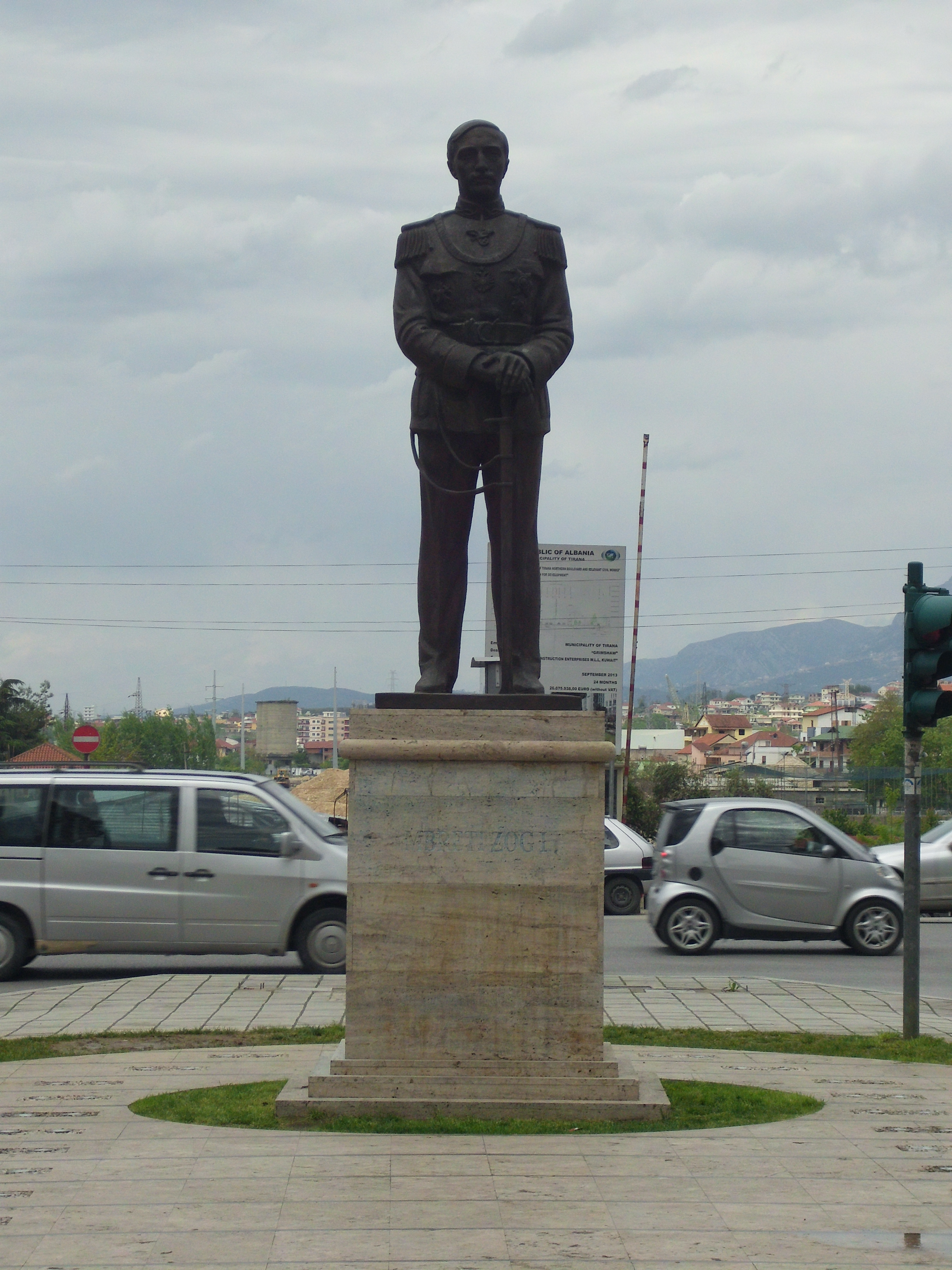
- Interactive map of King Zog statue
- Location: Zog I Boulevard
- Coordinates: 41.3357°N 19.8164°E
- Designer: Kreshnik Xhiku
- Type: Historical Monument
- Material: Bronze on stone pedestal
- Length: 3 metres (9.8 ft)
- Completion date: 24 December 2012
- Dedicated to: Zog I of Albania

The King Zog statue is a statue located in Tirana, Albania. It commemorates Zog I of Albania, who ruled Albania from 1925 to 1939.

The statue is placed at the beginning of the Zog I Boulevard facing in the direction of the center of the city, as in tribute to the creation of the modern capital, which was built during the reign of Zog I.

It is three meters tall and it was placed in the boulevard to commemorate the 100th Anniversary of the Independence of Albania. The inauguration ceremony was attended by the then Prime Minister of Albania, Sali Berisha, the Mayor of Tirana Lulzim Basha and Leka II, Crown Prince of Albania.
