= Muça (surname) =

Muça is an Albanian surname. Notable people with the surname include:

- Bledi Muca (born 1988), Greek footballer
- Gentian Muça (born 1987), Albanian footballer
- Selim Muça (1936–2016), Albanian Muslim cleric
- Shkëlqim Muça (born 1960), Albanian football coach and player

== See also ==
- Musa (name)
