= Osat (pasta) =

Albanian dried pasta

- Type: Dried pasta
- Course: Main
- Place of origin: Albania
- Region or state: Gjirokastër
- Associated cuisine: Albanian cuisine
- Serving temperature: warm
- Main ingredients: wheat flour, yogurt, milk, butter, salt

Osat is a traditional Albanian dried pasta originating in Gjirokastër. Similar to the northern rosnica, it is distinguished by its small, irregular dough pellets, which are traditionally prepared during summer, after the wheat harvest and then stored as a winter food reserve (zahire). Osat has long been a culinary staple among the region's Muslim community.

== Description ==
Osat is prepared from wheat flour mixed with yogurt or milk, butter and salt, with some traditional recipes also including eggs. The ingredients are kneaded into a firm dough, which is left to rest before being divided into small pieces. These are rolled by hand into small, irregular pellets and rubbed between the palms to give them their characteristic shape. The pellets are spread on wooden trays or baking pans and left to dry naturally for several days, after which they are stored in cotton or linen bags in a cool, dry place for long-term preservation.

Rich in gluten, osat is traditionally used in soups and baked meat dishes.

The Albanian writer Ismail Kadare, who spent his childhood in Gjirokastër, frequently mentions osat in his memoirs when describing everyday life and traditional cuisine in the city.
