= Haxhi Faik Hoxha =

Albanian Mufti

- Title: Mufti

Personal life
- Born: April 14, 1930 Shkodër, Albanian Kingdom
- Died: May 12, 2011 (aged 81) Shkodër, Albania
- Home town: Shkodër
- Occupation: Imam, Alim, Mufti

Religious life
- Religion: Islam
- Denomination: Sunni
- Jurisprudence: Hanafi
- Creed: Maturidi

Muslim leader
- Post: Mufti of Shkodër
- Period in office: 1991-2003

Haxhi Faik Hoxha (1930–2011) was an Albanian Imam, Alim, Mufti and educationist from Shkodër. He was known for his role in Albania's post-communist Islamic revival.

== Early life ==
Haxhi Faik was born on April 14, 1930, in the “Parrucë” neighborhood of Shkodër. He was the son of Sheh Qazim Hoxha, a Sufi Sheikh and Islamic preacher. Hoxha began his education at the “Shkolla e Kuqe” in Tirana, completing it in 1939. He later attended the “Medreseja e Përgjithshme” in Tirana, where he graduated in 1948.

== Career and Persecution under Communism ==
In 1950, Haxhi Faik Hoxha was appointed as a professor at Medreseja e Përgjithshme, where he taught religious and general subjects. After completing military service in 1954, he worked as an accountant at the Shkodër Artisans’ Cooperative. In 1966, he was arrested during Albania's communist regime and sentenced to 23 years in prison due to his religious activities and beliefs.

== Post-Communist Regime Revival ==
Following the fall of communism in the early 1990s, Haxhi Faik became a key figure in the revival of Islam in Albania. In 1991, he was appointed Mufti of Shkodër by the Muslim Community of Albania, a position he held until 2003. He played a central role in the reconstruction of religious institutions, overseeing the construction of nine mosques in Shkodër city and 38 in rural areas. He also founded the “Haxhi Sheh Shamia” Medrese, in Shkodra.

== Honours ==
Haxhi Faik's contributions to both the religious and cultural life of Shkodër were widely recognized. In 1999, he was awarded the title of “Qytetar Nderi” (Honorary Citizen) by the Shkodër Municipality. He was also honored by the President of Albania, Sali Berisha, with the title “Pishtar i Demokracisë” (Torchbearer of Democracy). In 2010, the Muslim Community of Albania awarded him the title “Mufti Nderi i Shkodrës” (Honorary Mufti of Shkodër).

== Death and legacy ==
Haxhi Faik Hoxha died on May 12, 2011, at the age of 81. His funeral, held at the Ebu Bekër Mosque in Shkodër, was attended by various religious and community leaders.

Haxhi Faik is remembered for his role in fostering cooperation between different religious communities and his work to ensure the continuity of Islamic faith in the region.

== See also ==
- Islam in Albania
- Muslim Community of Albania
