= Skënder Bruçaj =

Grand Mufti of Albania (2014-2019)

- Title: Grand Mufti

Personal life
- Born: 22 June 1976 (age 50) Malësia e Madhe, People's Socialist Republic of Albania

Religious life
- Religion: Islam
- Denomination: Sunni
- Jurisprudence: Hanafi
- Creed: Maturidi

Muslim leader
- Post: Head of the Muslim Community of Albania
- Period in office: 2014–2019
- Predecessor: Selim Muça
- Successor: Bujar Spahiu

Skëndër Bruçaj was born on June 22, 1976, in the district of Malësia e Madhe, Albania. He served as chairman of Albanian Muslim Community from 2014 to 2019. His successor is Bujar Spahiu.

== Early life and education ==
After finishing the primary school in his birthplace, he was among the first contingent of student’s sent by the Muslim Community of Albania to Turkey for further studies in 1992.

In 1996 he finished the “Beykoz Imam Hatip” High School in Istanbul, Turkey. After that, he completed the high studies in the Institute of Foreign Languages at the Boğaziçi University, in which after he certified his English proficiency continued his studies at the Faculty of Social Sciences - Psychology Branch.

During 2010 – 2011 years he completed his postgraduate studies, while actually he is attending doctoral studies on thesis: “Quality Management in Education”

Bruçaj has attained a degree in psychology and the English language.

== Career as advisor and academic ==
For some years later he has worked as an adviser for foreign companies. In 2008 he was appointed as the head of the Career Planning Office at the “Epoka” University in Tirana.

In September of the same year he was appointed by the Muslim Community of Albania as the head of the commission for the opening of Bedër University. With the opening of the university he began as a lecturer at the Faculty of Humanities, in the Department of Islamic Sciences and Law, in three languages: Albanian, English and Turkish.

During September 2011 and December 2013, apart from giving lesions at the university in Social Psychology and Islamic Psychology, he was also Head of the Department of Law and vice dean of Faculty of Humanities at Bedër University.

Mr. Skënder Bruçaj has also been the Director of the Center for Continuing Education and Vocational Training at Bedër University.

== Muslim Community of Albania leader (2014-2019) ==
Taking in consideration his academic background, the leadership of the Muslim Community of Albania (MCA) elected Bruçaj as the vice head in December 2013 and as the head of the organisation in March 2014. The election of Bruçaj to the position was considered by many Muslims and imams in Albania as illegal and violating MCA statutes. They viewed Bruçaj's election as successful interference by the Gülen movement which for them sought to dominate the main Muslim institution of Albania. Major Albanian politicians commended the election of Bruçaj as MCA leader, as did many Western embassies in Albania. As a newly elected leader, Bruçaj stated that a taskforce had been established to place certain mosques not following the ideology of the MCA under the control of the organisation. During August 2014 after the Albanian government conducted operations to end drug cultivation activities in Lazarat, Bruçaj visited the village and commended practicing Muslim families who had distanced themselves from drug related activities due to their religious convictions.

Bruçaj, as MCA leader has repeated the official Albanian state narrative of religious harmony and of the country being an example to Europe for religious tolerance. In Albanian public life Sunni clergy alongside Sufi Bektashis appear as equals and Bruçaj being Sunni mufti walks and speaks at religious and other official observances with Bektashi leader Baba Mondi.

Mr. Bruçaj has participated in many national and international conferences as a speaker in the name of Bedër University and Muslim Community of Albania.

== Personal life ==
Bruçaj speaks three foreign languages: English, Turkish and Italian. He is married and has two sons.
