= Hafiz Ibrahim (disambiguation) =

Hafiz (or Hafez) Ibrahim may refer to:

- Hafez Ibrahim (1871–1932), Egyptian poet
- Hafiz Ibrahim Dalliu (1878–1952), Albanian alim
- Hafiz Mohamad Ibrahim (1889-1968), Indian politician
- Hafiz Ibrahim (politician), Bangladeshi politician
