= Bujar Spahiu =

Grand Mufti of Albania

- Title: Grand Mufti

Personal life
- Born: 26 February 1976 (age 50) Kukës, People's Socialist Republic of Albania

Religious life
- Religion: Islam
- Denomination: Sunni

Muslim leader
- Post: Head of the Muslim Community of Albania
- Period in office: 2019–present
- Predecessor: Skënder Bruçaj

Bujar Spahiu (born 26 February 1976) is an Albanian Muslim scholar who has been the Grand Mufti of Albania since March 2019. He is also the chairman of the Sunni Muslim Community of Albania. His predecessor was Skënder Bruçaj. Previously, he served as vice chairman of the Muslim Community of Albania.

Spahiu had been director of the Department of Education in the Muslim Community of Albania.

== Early life ==
Spahiu earned a degree in theology from Al-Azhar University in Egypt.

== Election ==
The election process for the new chairman of the Muslim Community of Albania was held on 2 March 2019. He was elected chairman of the Muslim Community of Albania. He received 26 votes against 2 votes over Mufti of Tirana Ylli Gurra. The election of Bujar Spahiu to head the KMSH was marred by controversy. Some imams and other Muslim clerics like Gurra viewed it as illegal that contravened the rules of KMSH and regarded his elevation to the position as a coup by the Gülen movement which is based in the United States.
