= Hafiz Sabri Koçi =

Albanian Religious Leader and Sufi Sheikh

- Title: Grand Mufti

Personal life
- Born: 14 May 1921 Orenjë, Albania
- Died: 18 June 2004 (aged 83) Tirana, Albania

Religious life
- Religion: Islam
- Denomination: Sunni
- Jurisprudence: Hanafi
- Tariqa: Tijaniyyah
- Creed: Maturidi

Muslim leader
- Post: Head of the Muslim Community of Albania
- Period in office: 1991–2004
- Predecessor: Position vacant during Communist Era (1967–1990)
- Successor: Selim Muça

Haxhi Hafiz Sabri Koçi (14 May 1921 – 18 June 2004) was an Albanian alim and shaikh of the Tijāniyyah tariqa who served as the Grand Mufti of Albania in the 1990s.

== Biography ==
He was born in Orenjë near Librazhd to Idriz and Zejne. Idriz worked in Thessaloniki, but one year after his son was born, Idriz died. With the help of the mayor of the administrative unit Adem Kastrati from Shkodra, he was sent and educated in Shkodër. He started his education in 1932 and given his voice afterwards he became the muezzin of Rusi i Vogël mahala mosque.

Koçi served as the imam of Drisht from 1938–1939 before assuming the same role in Shkodër. Koçi was promoted to the mufti of Krujë in 1955. The next year, he was named mufti of Kavajë. He was persecuted for his faith by Enver Hoxha and subsequently spent 23 years in jail for refusing to support the new drive towards complete atheism. After the Muslim community of Albania was recognized in 1991, Koçi served as its Grand Mufti. Upon his death, Koçi was succeeded by Selim Muça.
