= Ndok Gjeloshi =

Albanian collaborator with Fascist Italy

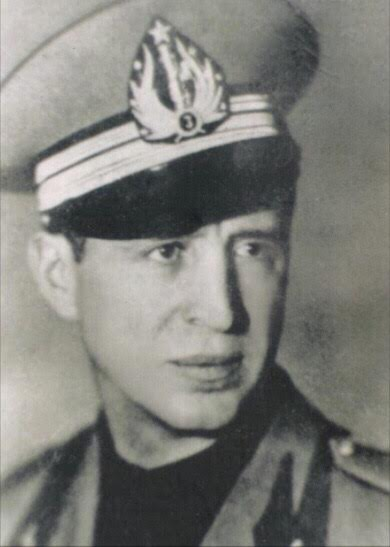
- Born: 15 November 1893; Mekshaj, Shala, Sanjak of Scutari, Ottoman Empire (modern day Albania)
- Died: 11 April 1943 (aged 49); Tirana, Albanian Kingdom
- Cause of death: Assassination by Myslim Keta, an Albanian partisan
- Military career
- Allegiance: Principality of Albania
- Conflicts: June Revolution; World War II

Ndok Gjeloshi (15 November 1893 – 11 April 1943) was an Albanian army officer and Militia commander during World War II.

== Life ==
Gjeloshi was born in Mekshaj, Shalë municipality of Dukagjin region in North Albania, on the 15th of November 1893, then it was the Sanjak of Scutari, Ottoman Empire, today modern Albania. His family were a part of the Shala tribe. He studied in the Franciscan College in Shkodër, and after that finished the Military Academy of Modena.

Gjeloshi supported Prince Wied during his short reign of the Principality of Albania, and like many other pro-Wied nationalists he was a member of the short-lived "Albanian Nationalist Party" (Albanian: Partia Nacionaliste Shqiptare).

Supporter of Fan Noli's political ideas, he was an active participant of the June Revolution, and was promoted "Captain" of the border guard. After Ahmet Zogu's return from Yugoslavia, he fled the country and went in exile.

In 1926, together with Loro Caka, a Catholic priest, Gjeloshi organized a rebellion in Dukagjin. The rebellion could not spread in nearby regions; it remained isolated and was quelled by Zogist forces. Gjeoloshi fled again. He joined the Albanian political émigré in Vienna, Austria and became member of the "National Union" (Albanian: Bashkimi Kombëtar), an organization of anti-Zog activists in exile, which was formed in 1925 in Vienna with the initiative of Ali Kelcyra, Angjelin Suma, Xhemal Bushati, and Sejfi Vllamasi.

=== Zog's assassination attempt ===
In 1931, he was arrested along with Aziz Çami for an assassination attempt against King Zog I. According to Gjeloshi's memories, he studied the scene very carefully before the assassination attempt. His memories contrast with the official version which stated that Zog fired back and Llesh Topallaj (killed by Gjeloshi) hurried to cover Zog with his body.

He was sentenced to 3 years and 6 months by the court, together with Çami (2 years and 6 months). Other organizers, including Qazim Mulleti, Mustafa Merlika-Kruja, Rexhep Mitrovica, Angjelin Suma, Sejfi Vllamasi, etc., were released soon after their arrest. They were expelled from Austria and most subsequently moved to Paris. Gjeloshi would remain in Prague after his release.

=== Return to Albania ===
Gjeloshi returned to Albania after King Zog's exile during the Italian invasion of Albania. Because of his nationalistic ideas, considering that Kosovo and other regions joined the new Albanian state, he joined the local militia with the rank of Major. He was assassinated in Spring 1943 by a communist activist, Myslym Keta, in one of the main streets of Tirana.
