= Hafëz Ismet Dibra =

Albanian religious writer

- Title: Hafiz

Personal life
- Born: 1886 Debar, Ottoman Empire
- Died: 1955 (aged 68–69) Tirana, Communist Albania

Religious life
- Religion: Islam
- Denomination: Sunni
- Jurisprudence: Hanafi
- Creed: Maturidi

Hafiz Ismet Dibra (in Albanian: Hafiz Ismet Dibra; 1886 – 1955) was an Albanian religious leader and writer.

== Biography ==
He was born in 1886 in the city of Debar, Ottoman Empire, now North Macedonia. He initially studied in his hometown, and then in a madrasa, where he earned the honorary title of Hafiz. He lived and studied for a while in Constantinople, but then went to present-day Albania. There, he developed a wide range of educational and religious activities among Albanians. During the first congress of Muslim Albanians in Tirana in March 1923, he was elected chairman of the Islamic community. He taught religious subjects in a madrasa in Tirana, and during that time, he also gave lectures elsewhere. His religious and philosophical works were published in Tirana, and a collection of his works was published under the auspices of the Albanian Islamic Center in Detroit, USA, in 1933.

In 1945, Dibra was appointed as the director of the Madrasa of Tirana following the liberation of Albania.

On 11 December 1946, Dibra was arrested on the pretext of being a political opponent of the communist regime.
