= Qazim Mulleti =

Albanian politician and mayor

Qazim Mulleti in his office in Tirana

Qazim Mulleti (1893–1956) was an Albanian politician, nationalist and mayor of Tirana from 1939 through 1940 and its prefect from 1942 to 1944.

== Life ==
=== Early life ===
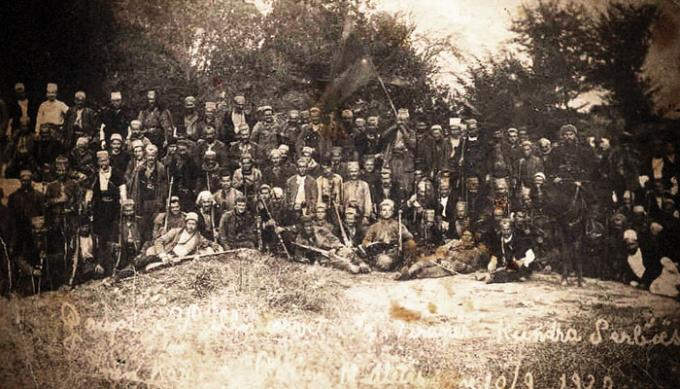
Albanian volunteers unit fighting against the Serbian army 1919-1920

Qazim Mulleti was born in "Sulejman Pasha" (Mulleti) neighborhood, in Tirana, Albania, Ottoman Empire on December 20, 1893.
He had taken first studies in Monastir, continued at Zosimea gymnasium in Yannina, and later conducted studies at Galatasaray Mekteb-i Sultanisi in Istanbul, with the gold medal. He was a polyglot. Mulleti knew Albanian, Turkish, Arabic, German, French, Italian, Latin, Greek, and Serbo-Croatian. He was fond of horseriding, ice skating, and collecting souvenirs – in his house he put aside one floor for the purpose of a mini museum.
In 1912, along with many other Albanian students of that time, he participated in raising the Albanian flag in Tirana and Vlora (see Albanian Declaration of Independence). In 1914, he was one of four adjutants of Prince Wied. He followed Wied to Vienna, where he lived until 1920. There, with the direct support and intervention of the Austrian Major General Ignaz Trollmann, who covered the Balkan region, Mulleti followed additional studies in the field of military diplomacy of war, together with his future enemy Ahmet Zogu and others. He was selected as a member of the Albanian delegation (36 people) that met with Archduke Franz Ferdinand of Austria congratulating him for the rise in power.

=== Political activity ===
In 1920, Mulleti participated in the Congress of Lushnjë. The government that emerged from that Congress was initially prevented from entering Durrës, which was initially dedicated as the destination for the temporary exercise of its functions, as Congress had chosen Tirana as the new capital. With the intervention of his uncle Mytesim Këlliçi, as well as Abdi Toptani, Mulleti himself, and other delegates from Tirana, the government moved to Tirana. As many patriots opened their homes available to the new government in Tirana, Mulleti's house became the first Ministry of Agriculture. He protected in continuity the idea that Tirana should be the capital of Albania, being a better option than Durrës. (Tirana, de jure, became Albania's capital in 1925.)
In September 1920 he was appointed the Commander of a Volunteer Force against Serbian Armies. From April 25 to May 3, 1921, he took part in the Congress for National Unity in Vlora, as a representative of Tirana's society "Vllaznia-Zgjimi" (English: Brotherhood - Awakening), along with Hafiz Ibrahim Dalliu and Musa Maçi as representatives of the other Society "Lidhja Kombëtare" (English: National League), and Avni Rustemi's society "Bashkimi" (English: Union).

=== Anti-Zogist activity and exile ===
He was prefect in the Dibër region during the governments of Sulejman Delvina and Fan Noli. After the failure of the June Revolution, he left Albania, first moving to Zara, Kingdom of Yugoslavia, and later in Vienna, where he stayed as a political immigrant until 1931. Apparently, Mulleti was a member of the "National Union" (Albanian: Bashkimi Kombëtar"), a union of Zog opponents in exile which was formed in Vienna (1925) with the initiative of Ali Këlcyra, Xhemal Bushati, Sejfi Vllamasi, etc. He would be arrested by Austrian authorities in 1931 together with Hasan Prishtina, Rexhep Mitrovica, Menduh Angoni, Luigj Shkurti, Sejfi Vllamasi, and Angjelin Suma as direct organizers of the failed attempt on Zogu, back then proclaimed King Zog I. The attackers were Aziz Çami and Ndok Gjeloshi. Zogu came unharmed, but Eqrem Libohova (1882–1948), who was with him, got wounded, and Zogu's guard Llesh Topallaj got killed.
After the release, Mulleti would move to Paris together with Prishtina, Suma, Nikolla Ivanaj, and others. During this time he would receive monetary support from Italy.
His name would come up again in a meeting of anti-Zogist diaspora including members of KONARE (founded by Noli), Committee for the National Defence of Kosovo (Albanian: Komiteti për Mbrojtjen Kombëtare të Kosovës) previously outlawed by Zogu, and other nationalist figures in exile. The initiative was triggered by the Revolt of 1935 in Fier against King Zog's regime and poverty. The meeting resulted in the formation of the "National Liberal League" (Albanian: Lidhja nacionale liberale), but Mulleti together with Mustafa Kruja did not sign because of disagreements on the League's programme, allegedly fearing that the support from Italy would be stopped.

=== World War II and another exile ===
Mulleti would return in Albania only after Zog's exile and the Italian invasion in April 1939. He was elected Mayor of Tirana (1939–1940). Certain well-known architectural objects in Tirana were initiation or given life while he was in office, i.e. Hotel Dajti, today's National Archeological Museum building, Academy of Arts building, Council of Ministers building (Albanian: Kryeministria), etc. In 1941 got nominated Special Emissary for the Liberation of Albanian Territories of Kosovo and Debar area. In 1942, he became acting prefect of Tirana.
His positioning during this time would be mixed. {!!! please note! The newspaper article mentioned as a reference does not mentioned that Mulleti helped the Hebrew population by using his post} Mulleti would contribute in helping Hebrew families by providing them Albanian documentation, exploiting authority provided by an agreement between the Albanian Regency and Hermann Neubacher. He would also help even communists from Tirana region to flee persecution. At the same time, his name appears in several executive orders for the deportation or imprisonment of other anti-fascist elements and their families.
The Tomori newspaper of Tirana, one of the main press-organs controlled by the Fascists, reported on August 5, 1942, that an assassination attempt was carried over towards Mulleti by an Albanian student named Pekmezi, apparently a communist of the "Youth" (Alb: Rinia) organization. Pekmezi hurled a bomb at Mulleti and his security escort. Two Italian officers were killed and Pekmezi himself was killed at spot by an Italian patrol.
Enver Hoxha and the communist regime that followed until 1990 would address Mulleti as a traitor, agent, criminal, or the "bloody prefect".
Today, his figure has been rehabilitated.

=== Family ===
While in Vienna, precisely in 1929, he married Hajrie Kusi. His son Reshit was the only child that came out of the marriage. The rest of the family moved back to Albania and will get reunited in 1939.
Mulleti would leave Albania before the Communist Partisans took over leaving behind his wife and son another time. They suffered for 45 years in hard-labor concentration camps in Tepelenë, Savër, Gradisht, Porto Palermo, etc. Hajrie died in 1980, while he was in the concentration camp in Savër (Lushnjë) and had had Alzheimer's.
Mulleti died on August 28, 1956, in Vicolo delle Grotte, Rocca di Papa, near Rome.

== Representation in art ==
Mulleti would be depicted in comedies during the Communist Era, based on a script of December 1948 by Besim Levonja (1922–1968). His personage would be brought to the public first by Mihal Popi, and later by Robert Ndrenika and others. Specifically Mihal Popi's performance would be remembered as the best in overall; the play would go on for 25 years. The best-known version would be "The Prefect" (Albanian: Prefekti) of 1974, directed by Pirro Mani and adapted for TV screen by Vera Grabocka in 1976. Robert Ndrenika would take over the personage which would remain a symbol of the Albanian comedy.
Though the comedy was a highly humorous masterpiece in the artistic point of view regardless who the actors were, it depicted Mulleti in a very different way from what he really was. Mulleti's character would be described with deep nuances of ottomanism, orientalism, and ignorance, as well as a deeply corrupted person, vengeful, and ungrateful beside others. Furthermore, since the first play in 1949, one of the first of the Albanian People's Theater (Albanian: Teatri Popullor), his and his family members' real names would be used. Therefore, the comedy is described as a "combination of geniality and cruelty".
