= Bedër University =

University in Albania

Coordinates: 41.33921°N 19.81103°E

University College Bedër
- University College Bedër
- Motto: Në emër të vlerave! / In name of values!
- Type: Private. Study levels offered: Bachelor, Master
- Established: April 6, 2011
- Endowment: Financed by the Muslim Community of Albania
- Rector: Prof. Dr. Gjergj Sinani
- Academic staff: less than 50
- Students: less than 1000
- Location: St. "Jordan Misja", periphery of Tirana, Albania
- Campus: Suburban building
- Affiliations: Outside Albania: University of Vienna University several universities in Turkey
- Website: www.beder.edu.al

University College Bedër (Albanian: Kolegji Universitar Bedër) is a private non-profit university in Tirana, Albania. It was established in 2011 by the Muslim Community of Albania, thus completing the education cycle started with the reopening of the madrasas in 1991.

At the Webometrics Ranking of World Universities, Beder University is ranked as the fifth university in Albania.

BU is a coed institution. It offers Bachelor, Master of Science and Professional master's degrees in English and Albanian. Two bachelor programs are 100% English. On June 3 of 2013 Beder signed a Memorandum of Understanding with University of Tirana. They have started the construction of their modern campus in Sauk.

The current rector is Prof. Dr. Gjergj Sinani.

== See also ==
- List of universities in Albania
