= Haxhi Xhaferr Shkodra =

Albanian religious leader

Imam Haxhi Xhaferr Shkodra
- Title: Imam

Personal life
- Born: 12 December 1931 Kavaja
- Died: 10 December 2016 (85 old) Kavaja
- Children: 4

Religious life
- Religion: Islam
- Denomination: Sunni
- Jurisprudence: Hanafi
- Creed: Maturidi

Muslim leader
- Post: Religious leader
- Period in office: 1991 – 92
- Influenced by: Hafiz Ali Korça

Haxhi Xhaferr Shkodra (Kavaja, 12 December 1931 – 10 December 2016) was an Albanian ulamalu (religious leader) and imam.

== Biography ==
He was born on 12 December 1931, in the city of Kavaja. Haxhi Xhaferri's parents settled in Kavaja 100 years ago. His family origin was from Shkodra. He dedicated himself to religion from an early age and studied under the scholar Hafiz Ali Korça, receiving a solid religious education. He served at the Great Mosque of Kavaja until 1967, when religion was banned by law by the communist regime of Enver Hoxha. During this time, he completed his general high school education at "Medar Shtylla" (1964-1968) without interrupting his work, but he could not pursue further his studies due to the regime's suppression of religion. He worked in the Communal Services of Kavaja until the arrival of democracy and the fall of communist regime.

He became the first director of the Kavaja Madrasa (1991-1998), and in September 1993, through his initiative, the Madrasa was named “Hafiz Ali Korça.” From 1991 until his passing, he served with devotion.

== Contribution for Kosovo ==
In 1998-99, when Serbian criminals forcibly deported over 800,000 Albanians during Kosovo War, Haxhi Xhaferri addressed his fellow citizens: "The Serbs are killing our Albanian brothers in Kosovo. They are burning their houses, killing children in the mother's womb.The barbarity of Serbian cannibals can be read in the eyes of Kosovo Albanian refugees. That's why I appeal to you believers of Islam and Christians, that every house in the city and in the countryside becomes a hearth of generosity, because we are with them in body, heart and blood!" He helped in the settlement of many Albanian families from Kosovo to Kavajë.

== Charity and other contributions ==
As a humanitarian, Haxhi Xhaferri distributed economic and financial aid to families with low incomes. He has also helped students to continue their studies inside and outside the country with his foundation, in the branches they want. In cases of funerals or as known in Islam janazah, Haxhi Xhaferri was always the first who would contribute and provides free services for the community at any time.

== Honours ==
In 1993, the former president of the Republic, Sali Berisha, for religious merit in the service of the fatherland and for religious harmony, awarded to Haxhi Xhaferr Shkodra, the high decoration of the Patriot.
