= Zogu I Boulevard =

Street in Tirana, Albania

Zog I (first) Boulevard
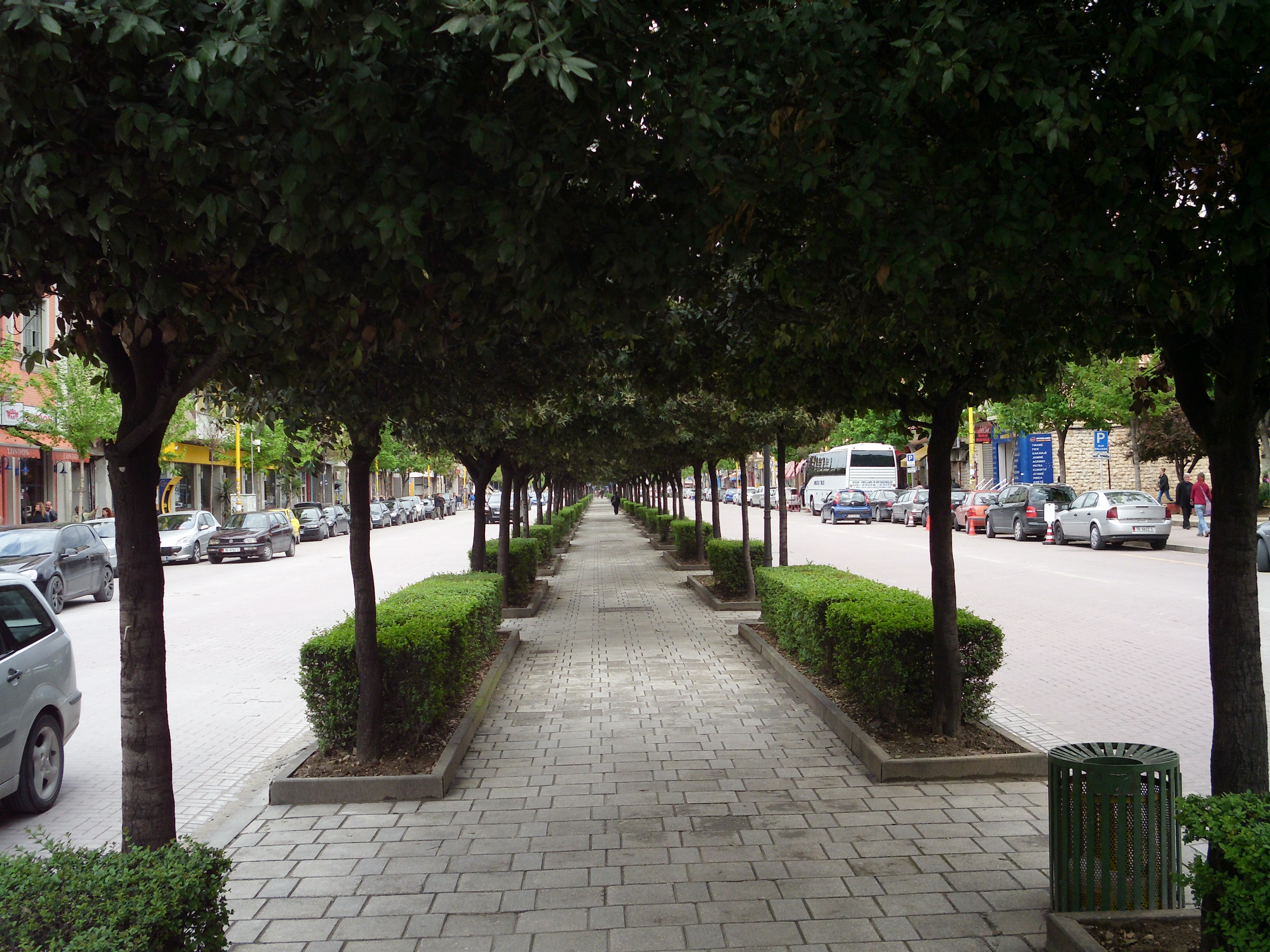
- View of the Boulevard.
- Native name: Bulevardi Zogu i parë (Albanian)
- Type: Public square
- Length: 1.1 km
- Location: Tirana, Albania
- Coordinates: 41.3322°N 19.8173°E
- From: Skanderbeg Square
- To: New Boulevard of Tirana

Other
- Known for: Dedicated to Zog I of Albania

The Zogu I Boulevard or Boulevard Zog I (Albanian: Boulevardi Zogu i parë) (formerly Stalin Boulevard) was the first and the only boulevard at that time and is a major boulevard in Tirana, Albania, named after Zog I of Albania, the King of Albania who ruled the country between 1925 and 1939.

It runs in a northerly direction from the central Skanderbeg Square towards the recently completed New Boulevard of Tirana. South of the square the avenue becomes Dëshmorët e Kombit Boulevard, running south. During the communist period, the Boulevard was named 'Stalin Boulevard' and the name was changed after the restoration of democracy in Albania. For the first time the boulevard was named Boulevard Zogu I, and then it was called "Viale del Impero" (Avenue of the Empire), then it was called "Boulevard Mussolini" and then it was divided into two parts, which were called "Boulevard Martyrs of the Nation" and "Stalin Boulevard".

This boulevard has been the 'Statue of Liberty' for all those who came to the capital by train, which was the most massive means of transport before the 90s. They came as visitors, as students, they came with work service, etc. It was the most favorite road in Tirana, as it was not only a road of various services, but thousands of romances were born from this road, boys and girls waiting for each other at the train, but also at the Faculty of Sciences. So, the Train street carries a lot of history and the municipality of Tirana has done one of the most beautiful things that has restored the glory of this boulevard, turning it into one of the most visited boulevards in Tirana.

It is 35 linear meters wide, increasing the width of the sidewalks on both sides to 8.25 meters. The boulevard has two vehicle lanes on both sides of it, and the material type for both the road and sidewalks is white stone asphalt.

On both sides of the boulevard, 4 new squares were built by the Municipality. The first square is the "pocket" square and is paved with stone tiles furnished with greenery. There is also the "village" square, which has a water fountain, which creates the impact of a village center. "Fortuzi" square was built on "Fortuzi" street, and the fourth square is "Universitetit" square, which already has a fantastic image.

In 2012, a statue of Zog I was placed in the boulevard in the event of the 100th Anniversary of the Independence of Albania.

== See also ==
- Landmarks in Tirana
- Architecture of Albania
