= Selim Muça =

- Title: Grand Mufti

Personal life
- Born: 1 February 1936 Albania
- Died: 18 September 2016 (aged 80) Tirana, Albania

Religious life
- Religion: Islam

Muslim leader
- Post: Head of the Muslim Community of Albania
- Period in office: 2004–2014
- Predecessor: Hafiz Sabri Koçi
- Successor: Skënder Bruçaj

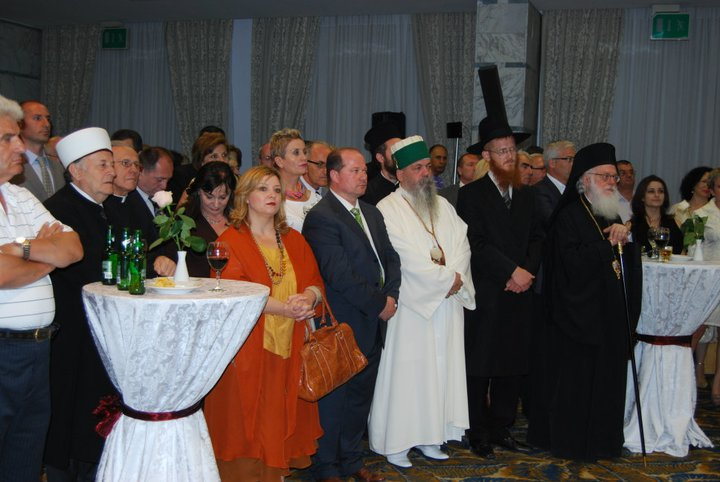
Muça (left - white turban on the head) with Baba Edmond Brahimaj in the Tirana Synagogue

Haxhi Selim Muça (1 February 1936 – 18 September 2016) was an Albanian Muslim cleric who served as the Grand Mufti of Albania from 2004 to 2014.

== Biography ==
Selim Muça was born on 1 February 1936. He was also the head of the Sunni Muslim Community of Albania. His predecessor was Shaikh Hafiz Sabri Koçi, and his successor was Skënder Bruçaj.

Muca died in Tirana on 18 September 2016, at the age of 80.
