= Zog I =

Leader of Albania from 1922 to 1939

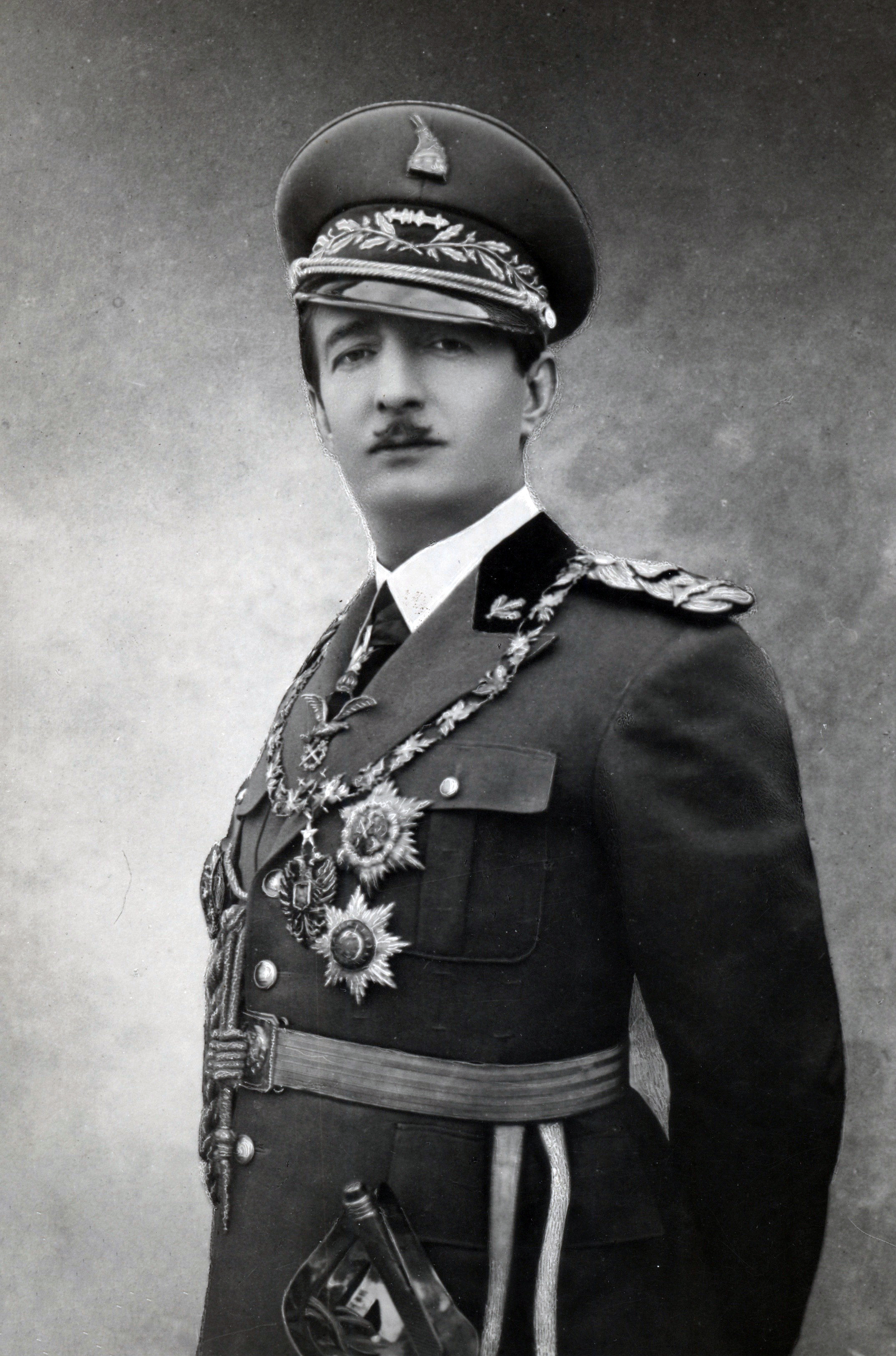
- Zog I in 1939

King of Albania
- Reign: 1 September 1928 – 9 April 1939 (Note: Though Zog I was only formally deposed on 2 January 1946, he enjoyed little recognition after the occupation of Albania by Italy. He was not welcomed as a royal when he arrived in England. The UK refused to form an Albanian government in exile and supported Hoxha and the communist partisans against Nazi Germany and Italy after 1944.)
- Predecessor: Wilhelm, Prince of Albania
- Successor: Victor Emmanuel III

President of Albania
- In office 31 January 1925 – 1 September 1928
- Preceded by: Office established (de facto); Vilhelm I (de jure, as Prince)
- Succeeded by: Himself as King

Prime Minister of Albania
- In office 26 December 1922 – 25 February 1924
- Preceded by: Xhafer bej Ypi
- Succeeded by: Shefqet Vërlaci
- In office 6 January 1925 – 1 September 1928
- Preceded by: Ilias Vrioni
- Succeeded by: Koço Kota
- Born: Ahmed Muhtar Bey Zogolli; 8 October 1895; Burgajet Castle, Burrel, Ottoman Empire
- Died: 9 April 1961 (aged 65); Suresnes, Seine, France
- Burial: Cimetière parisien de Thiais (1961–2012); Mausoleum of the Albanian Royal Family (since 2012)
- Spouse: Géraldine Apponyi de Nagyappony (m. 1938)
- Issue: Leka, Crown Prince of Albania
Names
- Ahmet Muhtar Bey Zogolli
- House: Zogu
- Father: Xhemal Pasha Zogolli
- Mother: Sadije Toptani
- Religion: Sunni Islam

Zog I (born Ahmed Muhtar Bey Zogolli; 8 October 1895 – 9 April 1961) was an Albanian statesman and aristocrat who served as the leader of Albania from 1922 to 1939. At age 27, he first served as Albania's youngest ever prime minister (1922–1924), then as president (1925–1928), and finally as king (1928–1939).

Born to an aristocratic beylical family in Ottoman Albania, Zogolli was active in Albanian politics from a young age and fought for Austria-Hungary in World War I. In 1922, he adopted the surname Zogu. He held various ministerial posts in the Albanian government before being driven into exile in June 1924, but returned later that year with Yugoslav and White Russian military support and was elected prime minister. He was elected president in January 1925 and vested with dictatorial powers, with which he enacted major domestic reforms, suppressed civil liberties, and struck an alliance with Benito Mussolini's Fascist Italy. In 1928, he proclaimed Albania a monarchy and acceded to the throne as Zog I. He married Geraldine Apponyi de Nagy-Appony in 1938, and their only child, Leka, was born a year later.

Albania fell further under Italian influence during Zog's reign, and by the end of the 1930s the country had become almost fully dependent on Italy despite Zog's resistance. In April 1939, Italy invaded Albania and the country was rapidly overrun. Mussolini declared Albania an Italian protectorate under King Victor Emmanuel III, forcing Zog into an exile from which he never returned. He lived in England during World War II. After Albania was liberated in 1944, he was barred from ever returning to the country by the new, Communist-dominated government of Enver Hoxha. He was formally dethroned in 1946. Zog spent the rest of his life in France and died in April 1961 at the age of 65. His remains were buried at the Thiais Cemetery near Paris, before being transferred to the royal mausoleum in Tirana in 2012.

== Background and early political career ==
Zog was born as Ahmed Muhtar Bey Zogolli in Burgajet Castle, near Burrel in northern Albania, third son to Xhemal Pasha Zogolli, and first son by his second wife Sadije Toptani in 1895. His landowning family was of beylical rank, with feudal authority over the region of Mati. His grandfather was Xhelal Pasha Zogolli. His mother's Toptani family claimed to be descended from the sister of Albania's greatest national hero, the 15th-century general Skanderbeg. He was educated at Galatasaray High School (French: Lycée Impérial de Galatasaray) in Beyoğlu, a district of the capital of the Ottoman Empire. Upon his father's death in 1911, Zogolli became governor of Mat, being appointed ahead of his elder half-brother, Xhelal Bey Zogolli.

In 1912, he participated in the Albanian Declaration of Independence as the representative of the Mat District. As a young man during the First World War, Zogolli volunteered on the side of Austria-Hungary. He was detained at Vienna in 1917 and 1918 and in Rome in 1918 and 1919 before returning to Albania in 1919. During his time in Vienna, he grew to enjoy a Western European lifestyle. Upon his return, Zogolli became involved in the political life of the fledgling Albanian government that had been created in the wake of the First World War. His political supporters included many southern feudal landowners called beys, Turkish for "province chieftain" with title variations including Beyg, Begum, Bygjymi. The Bey title refers to the social group to which he belonged, which was also used by noble families in the north, along with merchants, industrialists, and intellectuals. During the early 1920s, Zogolli served as Governor of Shkodër (1920–1921), Minister of the Interior (March–November 1920, 1921–1924), and chief of the Albanian military (1921–1922). His primary rivals were Luigj Gurakuqi and Fan S. Noli. In 1922, Zogolli formally changed his surname from Zogolli to Zogu, which sounds more Albanian.

In 1924, he was shot and wounded in Parliament. A crisis arose in 1924 after the assassination of one of Zogu's industrialist opponents, Avni Rustemi; in the aftermath, a leftist revolt forced Zogu, along with 600 of his allies, into exile in June 1924. He returned to Albania with the backing of Yugoslav forces and Yugoslavia-based General Pyotr Wrangel's White Russian troops led by Russian Gen Sergei Ulagay and became prime minister.

== President of Albania ==
Standard used by Ahmet Zogu as President of the First Republic.

Zogu was officially elected as the first President of Albania by the Constituent Assembly on 21 January 1925, taking office on 1 February for a seven-year term. A new constitution vested Zogu with sweeping executive and legislative powers, to the point that he was effectively a dictator. He had the right to appoint all major government personnel, as well as one-third of the lower house.

Zogu's government followed the European model, though large parts of Albania still maintained a social structure unchanged from the days of Ottoman rule, and most villages were serf plantations run by the Beys. On 28 June 1925, Zogu ceded Sveti Naum to Yugoslavia in exchange for Peshkëpi (Pëshkupat) village and other concessions.

Zogu enacted several major reforms. His principal ally during this period was the Kingdom of Italy, which lent his government funds in exchange for a greater role in Albania's fiscal policy. His administration was marred by disputes with Kosovo Albanian leaders, primarily Hasan Prishtina and Bajram Curri, among others.

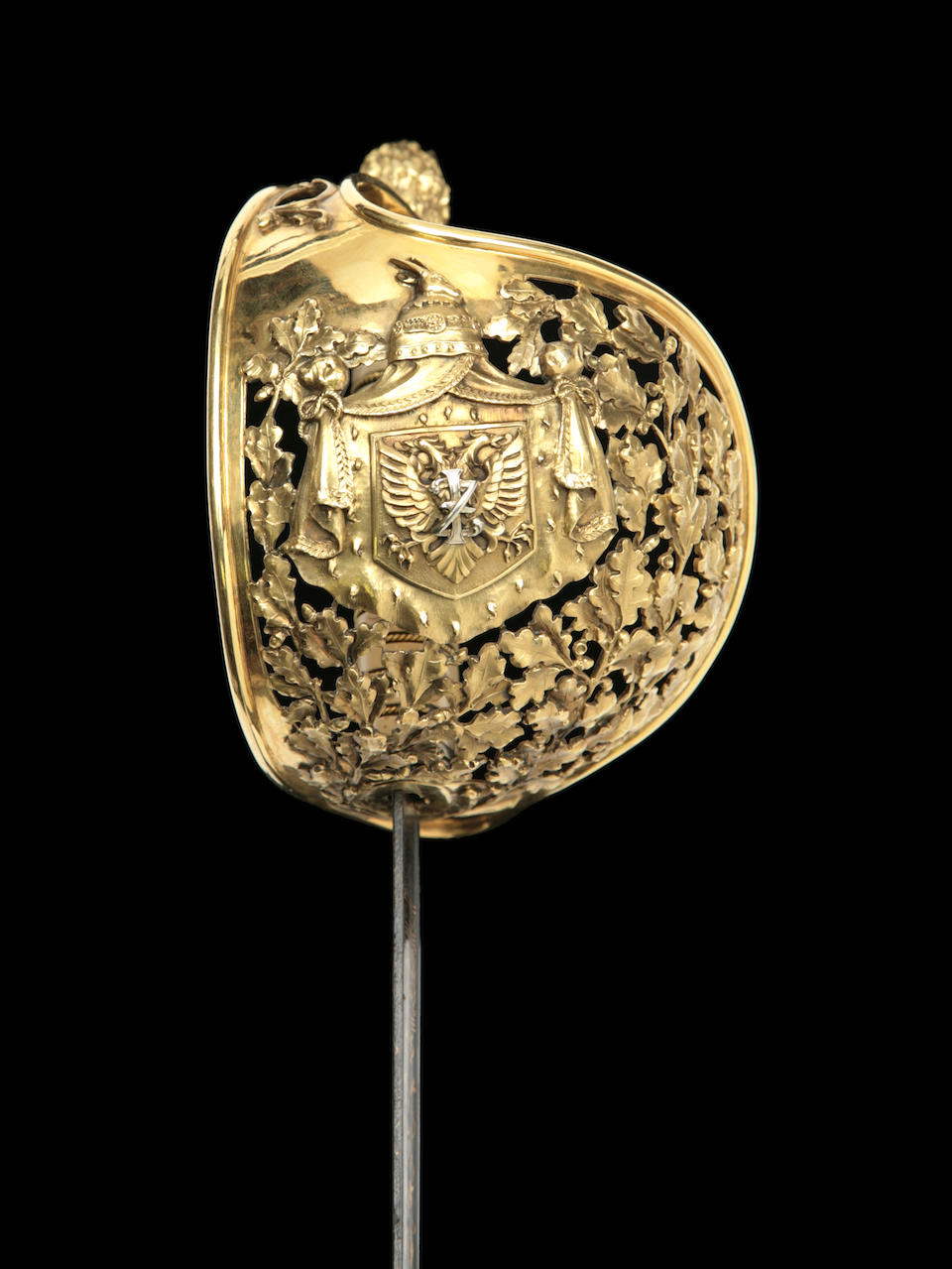
Royal sword commemorating the marriage of King Zog I

On the debit side, Zogu's Albania was a police state in which civil liberties were all but nonexistent and the press was closely censored. Political opponents were imprisoned and often killed. For all intents and purposes, he held all governing power in the nation.

== Albanian king ==
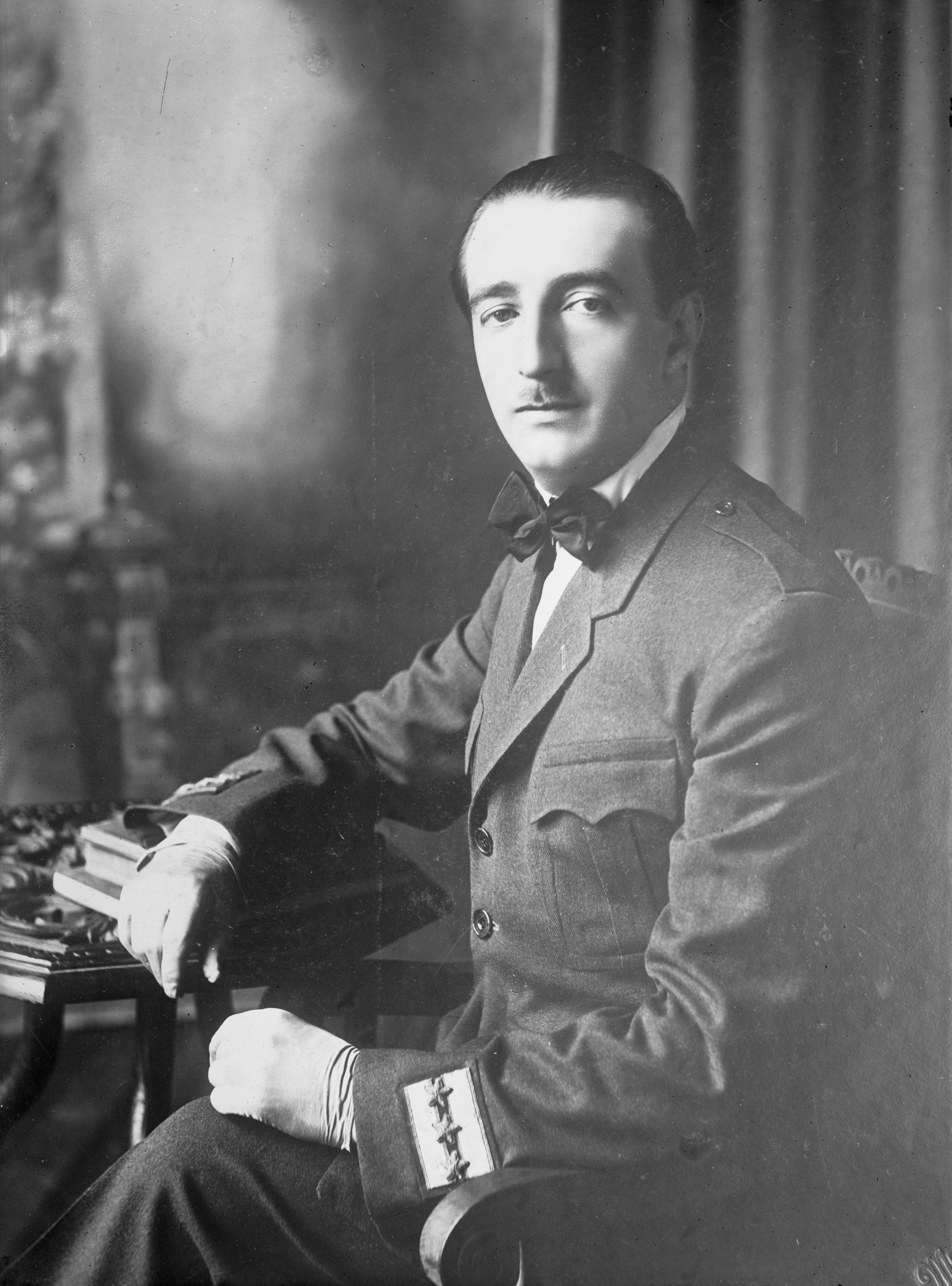
Ahmed Zogu

On 1 September 1928, Albania was transformed into a kingdom, and President Zogu declared himself to be Zog I, with the title King of the Albanians. He appointed as his advisor Mehmed Orhan Efendi, a prince of the recently abolished Ottoman Empire. He took as his regnal name his surname rather than his forename since the Islamic name Ahmet might have had the effect of isolating him on the European stage. He also initially took the parallel name "Skanderbeg III" (Zogu claimed to be a successor of Skanderbeg through descent through Skanderbeg's sister; "Skanderbeg II" was taken to be Prince Wied, but this fell out of use).

On the same day as he declared himself king (he was never technically crowned), he also declared himself Field Marshal of the Royal Albanian Army. He proclaimed a constitutional monarchy similar to the contemporary regime in Italy, created a strong police force, and instituted the Zogist salute (flat hand over the heart with palm facing downwards). Zog hoarded gold coins and precious stones, which were used to back Albania's first paper currency.

Royal standard of Zog I and of the Army

Zog's mother, Sadije, was declared Queen Mother of Albania, and Zog also gave his brother and sisters Royal status as Prince and Princesses Zogu. One of his sisters, Senije (c. 1897 – 1969), married Shehzade Mehmed Abid Efendi, another Ottoman prince and son of Sultan Abdul Hamid II.

Zog's constitution forbade any Prince of the Royal House from serving as Prime Minister or a member of the Cabinet, and contained provisions for the potential extinction of the royal family. The constitution also forbade the union of the Albanian throne with that of any other country, a term which would later be violated with the Italian invasion. Under the Zogist constitution, the King of the Albanians, like the King of the Belgians, ascended the throne and exercised Royal powers only after taking an oath before Parliament; Zog himself swore an oath on the Bible and the Quran (the king being Muslim) in an attempt to unify the country. In 1929, King Zog abolished Islamic law in Albania, adopting in its place a civil code based on the Swiss one, as Mustafa Kemal Atatürk had done in Turkey in the same decade.

Royal monogram

Although nominally a constitutional monarch, in practice Zog retained the dictatorial powers he had enjoyed as president. Thus, in effect, Albania remained a military dictatorship.

In 1938, as a result of a request from his advisor and friend Constantino Spanchis, Zog opened the borders of Albania to Jewish refugees fleeing persecution in Nazi Germany.

=== Life as king ===
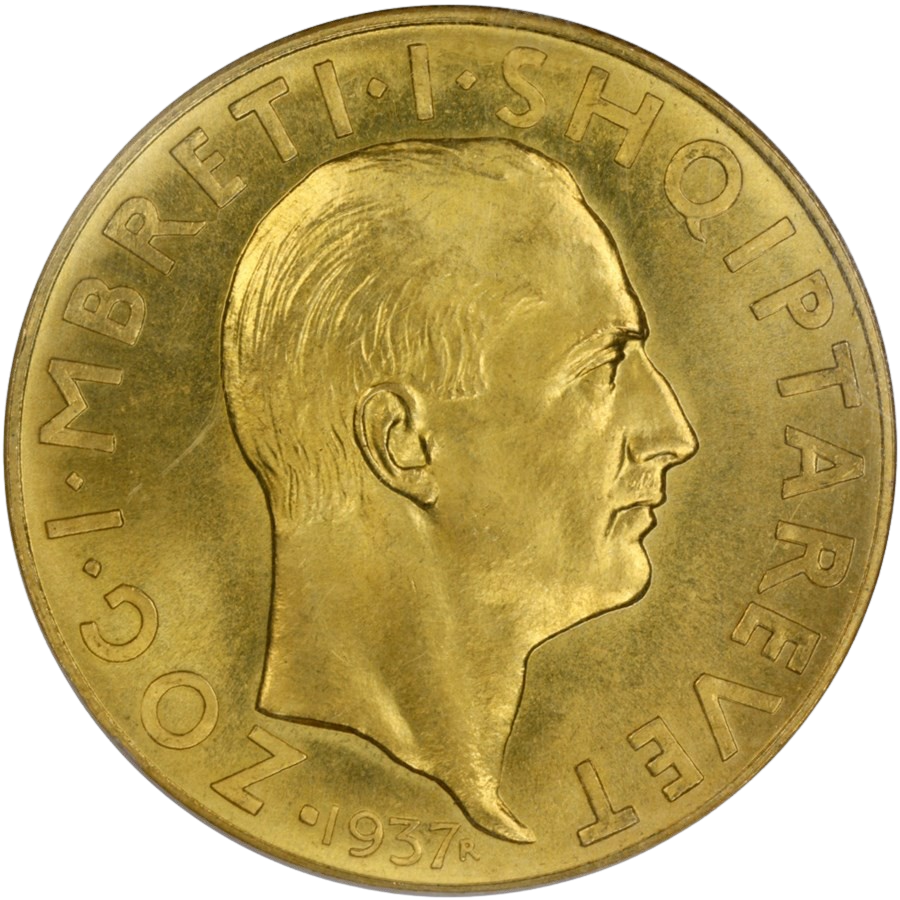
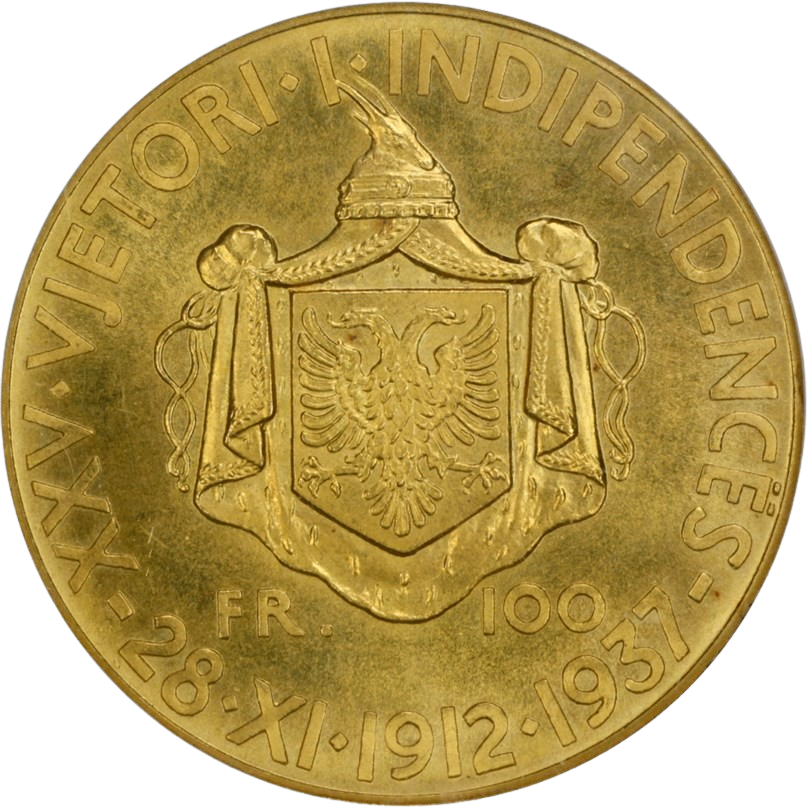
Reverse and Obverse of a Zogian gold hundred-franc coin.

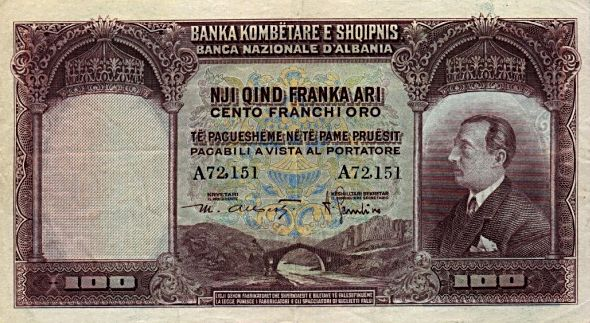
100-franc banknote of Zog's reign

Although born as an aristocrat and hereditary Bey, King Zog was somewhat ignored by other monarchs in Europe because he was a self-proclaimed monarch who had no links to any other European royal families. Nonetheless, he did have strong connections with Muslim royal families in the Arab World, particularly Egypt, whose ruling dynasty had Albanian origins. As king, he was honoured by the governments of Italy, Luxembourg, Egypt, Yugoslavia, France, Romania, Greece, Belgium, Bulgaria, Hungary, Poland, Czechoslovakia, and Austria.

Zog had been engaged to the daughter of Shefqet Bey Verlaci before he became king. Soon after he became king, however, he broke off the engagement. According to traditional customs of blood vengeance prevalent in Albania at the time, Verlaci had the right and obligation to kill Zog. The king frequently surrounded himself with a personal guard and avoided public appearances. He also feared that he might be poisoned, so the mother of the king assumed supervision of the royal kitchen.

In April 1938, Zog married Countess Geraldine Apponyi de Nagy-Appony, a Roman Catholic aristocrat who was half-Hungarian and half-American. The ceremony was broadcast throughout Tirana via Radio Tirana that was officially launched by the monarch five months later. Their only child, Crown Prince Leka, was born in Albania on 5 April 1939.

== Assassination attempts ==
About 600 blood feuds reportedly existed against Zog, and during his reign he reputedly survived more than 55 assassination attempts. One of these occurred inside the corridors of the Albanian Parliament premises on 23 February 1924. Beqir Valteri, originating from the same area as Zog, was waiting for him and opened fire suddenly. Zog was shot twice. Meanwhile, Valteri fled but, surrounded by the militia, took refuge in one of the bathrooms, refusing to surrender and singing patriotic songs. According to the memoirs of Ekrem Vlora, he surrendered after the intervention of Qazim Koculi and Ali Klissura. Zog stepped down briefly from political activity, but promised to forgive Valteri. Valteri, a member of the revolutionary Bashkimi ("The union") committee led by Avni Rustemi, was set free by the Court of Tirana after declaring that it was an individual act. Meanwhile, all rumors pointed to the opposition, specifically to Rustemi. Two weeks later Zog and Valteri would meet in private. Soon after, Rustemi would be assassinated.

Another attempt occurred on 20 February 1931, while Zog was visiting the Vienna State Opera house for a performance of Pagliacci. The attackers (Aziz Çami and Ndok Gjeloshi) struck whilst Zog was getting into his car. The attempt was organized by "National Union" (Albanian: Bashkimi Kombëtar"), a union of Zog opponents in exile which was formed in Vienna (1925) with the initiative of Ali Këlcyra, Sejfi Vllamasi, Xhemal Bushati, and others. Zog was in the company of Minister Eqrem Libohova, who was wounded, while Zog's guard Llesh Topallaj was mistaken for Zog by Gjeloshi, and shot three times in the back of the head. Çami's gun was stuck and did not fire. Zog came out of the event unharmed, thanks also to the prompt intervention of Albanian Consul Zef Serreqi and local police. The Austrian authorities arrested Çami, Gjeloshi, and later Qazim Mulleti, Rexhep Mitrovica, Menduh Angoni, Angjelin Suma, Luigj Shkurti, Sejfi Vllamasi, and others. All the Albanian political émigrés in Vienna were subsequently arrested, beside Hasan Prishtina. Most of them were quickly released and expelled from Austria. Gjeloshi was sentenced to 3 years and 6 months of jail, while Çami got 2 years and 6 months.

== Relations with Italy ==
The fascist government of Benito Mussolini's Italy had supported Zog since early in his presidency; that support had led to increased Italian influence in Albanian affairs. The Italians compelled Zog to refuse to renew the First Treaty of Tirana (1926), although Zog still retained British officers in the Gendarmerie as a counterbalance against the Italians, who had pressured Zog to remove them.

During the worldwide depression of the early 1930s, Zog's government became almost completely dependent on Mussolini. Grain had to be imported, many Albanians emigrated, and Italians were allowed to settle in Albania. In 1932 and 1933, Albania could not pay the interest on its loans from the Society for the Economic Development of Albania, and the Italians used this as a pretext for further dominance. They demanded that Tirana put Italians in charge of the Gendarmerie, join Italy in a customs union, and grant the Italian Kingdom control of Albania's sugar, telegraph, and electrical monopolies. Finally, Italy called for the Albanian government to establish teaching of the Italian language in all Albanian schools, a demand that was swiftly refused by Zog. In defiance of Italian demands, he ordered the national budget to be slashed by 30 percent, dismissed all Italian military advisers, and nationalized Italian-run Roman Catholic schools in the north of Albania to decrease Italian influence on the population of Albania. In 1934, he tried without success to build ties with France, Germany, and the Balkan states. Albania then drifted back into the Italian orbit.

Two days after the birth of Zog's son and heir apparent, on 7 April 1939 (Good Friday), Mussolini's Italy invaded, facing no significant resistance. The Albanian army was ill-equipped to resist, as it was almost entirely dominated by Italian advisors and officers and was no match for the Italian Army. The Italians were, however, resisted by small elements in the gendarmerie and general population. The royal family, realising that their lives were in danger, fled into exile, taking with them a considerable amount of gold from the National Bank of Tirana and Durrës. Since the royal family had expected an Italian invasion, the gathering of gold had started in advance. "Oh God, it was so short" were King Zog's last words to Geraldine on Albanian soil. Mussolini declared Albania a protectorate under Italy's King Victor Emmanuel III. While some Albanians continued to resist, "a large part of the population ... welcomed the Italians with cheers", according to one contemporary account.

== Former heir presumptive ==
Prior to the birth of Prince Leka, the position of heir presumptive was held by Tati Esad Murad Kryziu, who was born on 24 December 1923 in Tirana, and who was the son of the King's sister, Princess Nafije. He became an honorary General of the Royal Albanian Army in 1928, at age five. He was made Heir Presumptive with the style of His Highness and title of "Prince of Kosova" (Princ i Kosovës) in 1931. After the royal house's exile, he moved to France, where he died in August 1993, aged 69.

== Life in exile and death ==
The royal family fled to the Kingdom of Greece. Zog, speaking a few days after his arrival there, characterized Hitler and Mussolini as madmen facing "two fools who sleep": Chamberlain and Daladier. Zog went on to declare, "We prefer to die, from the littlest child to the oldest man, to show our independence is not for sale." The world, aware that Zog and his entourage had carried off most of the Albanian treasury's gold, was not impressed. After a short stay in Greece, the Zog party went to Istanbul in Turkey, then fled through Romania, Poland, Latvia, Sweden, Norway, and Belgium to Paris. Zog and his family lived for a time in France and fled when the Germans invaded. Their escape from France was helped by Prince Mehmed Orhan Osmanoğlu from the Ottoman Imperial Dynasty, who was aide-de-camp of Zog I.

The royal family then settled in England. Their first residence was at The Ritz in London. This was followed in 1941 by a brief stay at Forest Ridge, a house in the South Ascot area of Sunninghill in Berkshire, near where Zog's nieces had been at school in Ascot. In 1941 they moved to Parmoor House, Parmoor, near Frieth in Buckinghamshire, with some staff of the court living in locations around Lane End.

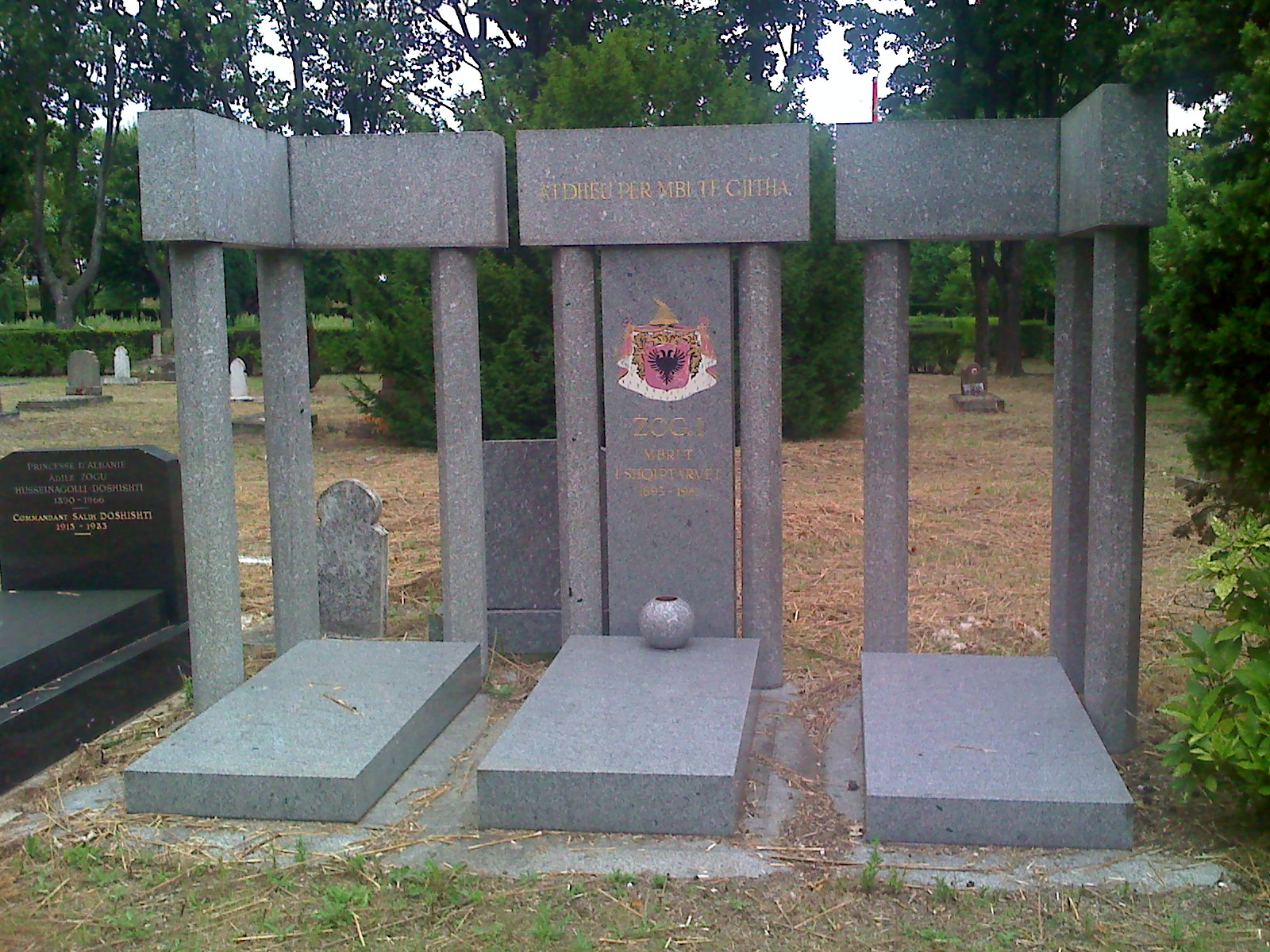
The grave of former King Zog I at the Cimetière de Thiais near Paris

In 1946, Zog and most of his family left England and went to live in Egypt at the behest of King Farouk. In 1951, Zog bought the Knollwood estate in Muttontown, New York, Long Island, but the sixty-room estate was never occupied; it quickly fell into ruin and Zog sold the estate in 1955. Farouk was overthrown in 1952, and the family left for France in 1955.

Zog made his final home in France, where he died at the Foch Hospital, Suresnes, Hauts-de-Seine, on 9 April 1961, age 65, from gastric cancer. Zog was said to have regularly smoked 225 cigarettes a day, giving him a possible claim to the title of the world's heaviest smoker in 1929, but had been seriously ill for some time. He was survived by his wife and son, and was initially buried at the cimetière parisien de Thiais, near Paris. On his death, his son Leka was pronounced H. M. King Leka of the Albanians by the exiled Albanian community.

His widow, Geraldine, died of natural causes in 2002 at the age of 87 in a military hospital in Tirana.

== Political legacy ==
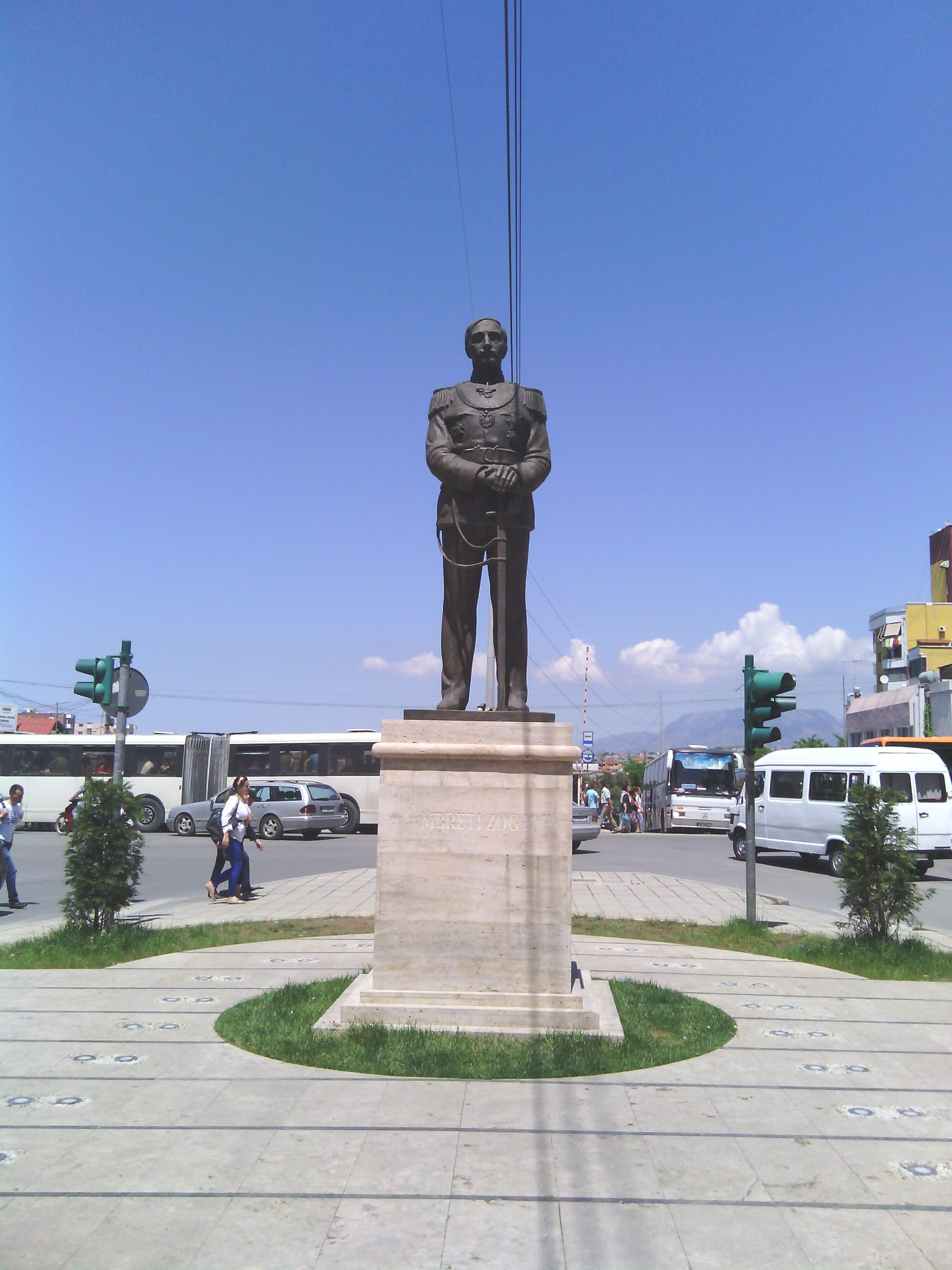
Statue of Zog on the eponymous Zogu I Boulevard in Tirana, Albania

During World War II, three resistance groups were operating in Albania: the nationalists, the royalists and the communists. Some of the Albanian establishment opted for collaboration. The communist partisans refused to co-operate with the other resistance groups and eventually took control of the country. They were able to defeat the Nazi remnants and had full control of Albania in November 1944.

Zog attempted to reclaim his throne after the war. However, when a Communist-dominated partisan movement seized power in 1944, one of its first acts was to ban Zog from ever returning to Albania. It formally deposed him in 1946.

In 1952, his representatives met with the representatives of the Yugoslavian government over possible collaboration. Sponsored by MI6 and the CIA, some forces loyal to Zog attempted to mount infiltrations into the country, but most were ambushed due to intelligence sent to the Soviet Union by spy Kim Philby.

A referendum in 1997 – seven years after the end of Communist rule – proposed to restore the monarchy in the person of Zog's son Leka Zogu who, since 1961, had been styled "Leka I, King of the Albanians". The official but disputed results stated that about two-thirds of voters favoured a continued republican government. Leka, believing the result to be fraudulent, attempted an armed uprising: he was unsuccessful and was forced into exile, although he later returned and lived in Tirana until his death on 30 November 2011. A main street in Tirana was later renamed "Boulevard Zog I" by the Albanian government.

== Repatriation to Albania ==
In October 2012, the government of Albania decided to bring back the remains of the former king from France, where he died in 1961. Zog's body was exhumed from the Thiais Cemetery, Paris on 15 November 2012. A guard of honour was provided by the French President, in the form of French Legionnaires in ceremonial dress.

Zog's remains were returned in a state ceremony on 17 November 2012, coinciding with celebrations for Albania's independence centennial. The bodies of the king and his family members now lie in the reconstructed royal mausoleum in the capital Tirana. The interment was attended by the government of Albania, including the President and Prime Minister, and representatives of the former royal families of Romania, Montenegro, Russia and Albania.

== Honours and awards ==
In Albania:

- Sovereign Head of the Royal Albanian Collar of Honour
- Sovereign Head of the Order of Fidelity
- Sovereign Head of the Order of Skanderbeg
- Sovereign Head of the Order of Bravery & Military Merit: First Class or Hero, breast star
- National Flag Order (posthumous)

From other countries:

- Commander of the Order of Franz Joseph with Swords (Austrian Empire, January 1917)
- Knight Grand Cross of the Legion of Honour (France, 1926)
- Knight of the Supreme Order of the Most Holy Annunciation (Kingdom of Italy, 14 December 1928 by Vittorio Emanuele III)
- Knight Grand Cordon of the Order of Saints Maurice and Lazarus (Kingdom of Italy, 14 December 1928)
- Knight Grand Cross of the Order of the Crown of Italy (Kingdom of Italy, 14 December 1928)
- Knight of the Order of the Gold Lion of the House of Nassau (Netherlands)
- Collar of the Order of Muhammad Ali (Kingdom of Egypt)
- Grand Cross with Collar of the Order of Carol I (Kingdom of Romania, 1928)
- Knight Grand Cross of the Order of the Karađorđe's Star (Kingdom of Yugoslavia)
- Knight Grand Cross of the Order of the Redeemer (Kingdom of Greece)
- Grand Cordon of the Order of Leopold (Belgium, 4 November 1929)
- Grand Cross of the Order of Civil Merit of Bulgaria (Kingdom of Bulgaria)
- Knight of the Order of the White Eagle (Poland)
- Member 1st Class with Collar of the Order of the White Lion (Czechoslovakia)
- Grand Star of the Decoration of Honour for Services to the Republic of Austria (Austria)
- Knight of the Order of the Gold Lion of the House of Nassau (Luxembourg)
- Knights Grand Cross of the Order of Saint Stephen of Hungary (Hungary, 1938)

== Cultural references ==
In episode 13 of Monty Python's Flying Circus, he is mentioned as a reporter for made-up news show called ProbeAround but suddenly dies.

Zog's name was in use by 1972 in the English language palaeontological mnemonic for the names of zonal index fossils in part of the Lower Carboniferous System of Great Britain (namely Cleistopora, which geologists decided to call 'zone k', Zaphrentis, Caninia, Seminula and Dibanophylum): "King Zog caught syphilis and died".

In the James Bond novel The Man with the Golden Gun, Ian Fleming writes of the villainous Francisco Scaramanga telling his compatriots that the Rastafari of Jamaica "believes it owes allegiance" to the King of Ethiopia, this "King Zog or what-have-you." Fleming had been assigned with the task of escorting Zog when in exile after Albania was annexed by Italy.

In his 1983 book Combined Forces, Jack Smithers borrows heroes from three other authors of the "snobbery with violence" thriller genre (Richard Hannay by John Buchan, "Bulldog" Drummond by "Sapper", and Berry Pleydell & Jonathan Mansel by Dornford Yates, each with their supporting characters), brings them together and has them assist King Zog in an attempt to reclaim the throne of Albania, and/or recover some of the royal treasury. Although the story might seem to draw on the real-world Operation Valuable (see above), except that Smithers portrayed the USA as opposed to the plans (on the assumption that their anti-monarchy sentiments would outweigh their anti-communism), the history of Valuable was not well known at the time of the book's publication.

In Aria, a 1987 British anthology film, Zog was a character in the first of ten short self-contained segments, each by a different director and each featuring a different opera aria. This segment, entitled 'Un ballo in maschera' after the Giuseppe Verdi opera, was directed by Nicolas Roeg, with actress Theresa Russell playing King Zog during a fictionalized account of his visit to Vienna in 1931 and the assassination attempt on the steps of that city's opera house (as noted earlier, Zog had actually seen a performance of Pagliacci before the real attack).

English synth-pop duo Pet Shop Boys mentioned him in the song Don Juan which was released as a b-side of their hit single Domino Dancing in 1988. In addition to Zog, other contemporary political figures from the Balkan countries are mentioned, as well as the song's eponymous protagonist, who is considered a metaphor for Adolf Hitler.

In the "new" Doc Savage pulp fiction novel, The Whistling Wraith (July 1993, Bantam/Spectra), from the original notes of Lester Dent (primary writer of the sagas) but now completed as a novel by Will Murray, the life and person of Zog, as well as Albania's political problems and foreign policy issues with Mussolini's Italy are key to the plot. The story slots into the Doc Savage timeline in 1938 (a few weeks after The Motion Menace, per p. 61). Egil Goz the First is clearly standing in for King Zog I, for both are Muslims and both were first president before being the first king of their Balkan nation (Italy is Santa Bellanca, which is behaving badly in Africa in the work, a tie to the invasion and conquest of Ethiopia).

== See also ==
- House of Zogu
- Royal Albanian Army
- Zogist salute
- Legality Movement
- History of Albania
- Self-proclaimed monarchy
- European interwar dictatorships

== Notes ==
Zog I House of Zogu Born: 8 October 1895 Died: 9 April 1961
Political offices
Preceded by Xhafer Ypi	Prime Minister of Albania; 1922–1924	Succeeded by Shefqet Bej Verlaci
Preceded by Ilias Bej Vrioni	Prime Minister of Albania; 1925	Vacant Title next held by Koço Kota
New title	President of Albania; 1925–1928	Vacant Title next held by Omer Nishani
Regnal titles
Vacant Title last held by Wilhelm of Wied as Prince of Albania	King of the Albanians; 1928–1939	Succeeded by Victor Emmanuel III
Preceded by Xhemal Pasha Zogu	Hereditary Governor of Mati; 1911–1939	Succeeded by Leka Zogu
Titles in pretence
Loss of title Italian invasion, communist regime	— TITULAR — King of the Albanians; 1939–1961	Succeeded by Leka Zogu
