= Ibrahim Dalliu =

Albanian Islamic scholar and educationist (1878–1952)

Hafëz Ibrahim Dalliu
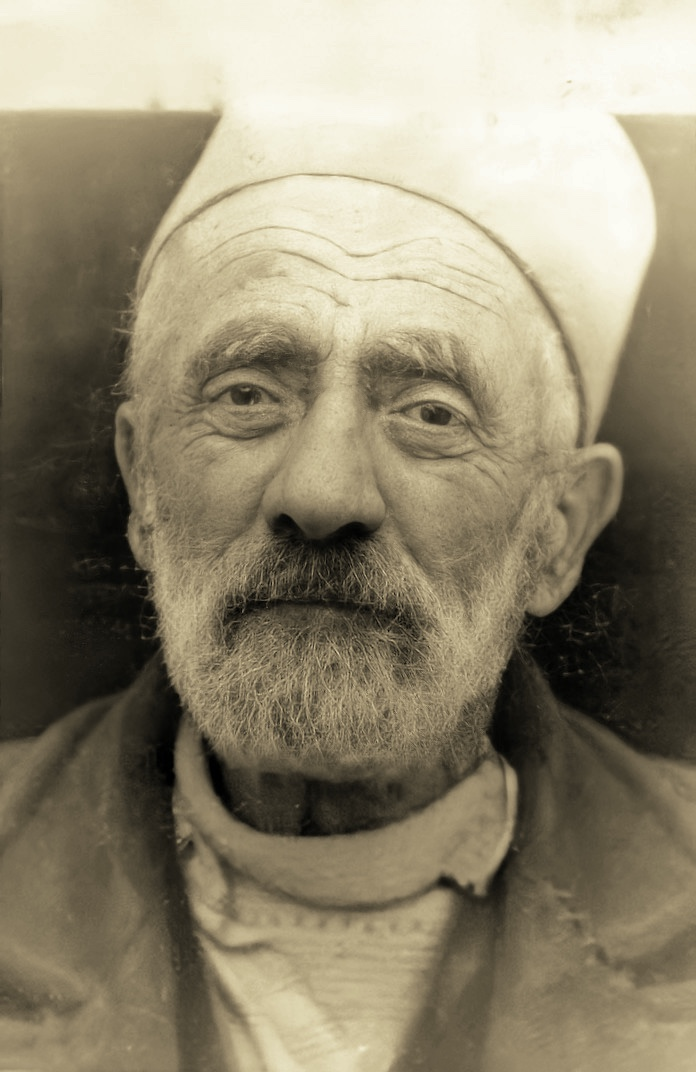
- Title: Hafiz

Personal life
- Born: 1878 Tirana, Ottoman Empire
- Died: 1952 (aged 73–74) Tirana, Communist Albania
- Education: Istanbul University

Religious life
- Religion: Islam
- Denomination: Sunni
- Jurisprudence: Hanafi
- Creed: Maturidi

Muslim leader
- Awards: Honor of the Nation

Hafiz Ibrahim Dalliu (1878 – 25 May 1952) was an Albanian Islamic scholar and educationist. He is remembered as one of the best mufassirs in Albania.

== Life ==
Ibrahim Dalliu was born in Tirana in 1878, in a middle class Muslim family, son of Mustafa Dalliu. He had two brothers, Hysni and Ali, both bearing titles hafiz and hadji. Ibrahim was an early childhood friend of Seremedin and Murat Toptani, with whom he kept close ties for the rest of hist life.

Dalliu studied theology in Istanbul. There he came in contact with the activists of the Central Committee for Defending Albanian Rights. He returned to Tirana where he started working as a teacher in 1901. At the same time he was a member of the local branch of the Bashkimi (Unity) Club, one of the many of that time throughout all Albanian populated areas.

Dalliu participated in the Congress of Elbasan, during 2–9 September 1909, as part of the Tirana delegation. One of the Congress's main achievement was the establishment of the Normal School of Elbasan which would prepare teachers for supporting the spread of Albanian education. He was imprisoned by the Ottoman authorities during 1909-1911 due to his nationalist activity.

On 26 November 1912, Dalliu was an active participant in the ceremony of raising the Albanian flag in Tirana, 2 days before the National Declaration of Independence. At the same time he drafted a letter-protest which was sent to the Serbian army approaching from the north. From April 25 to May 3, 1921, he took part in the Congress for National Unity in Vlora, together with Musa Maçi as representatives of the society "Lidhja Kombëtare" (National League), Qazim Mulleti of Tirana's society "Vllaznia-Zgjimi" (Brotherhood - Awakening), and Avni Rustemi for the society "Bashkimi" (Union).

During the interbellum period, Dalliu focused on teaching, writing, and translation. He is remembered in Albanian as one of the few high rank clerics who were devoted to the national cause as well as to religion. He taught for many years at the Madrasa of Tirana and wrote many work and studies on Islam. He also wrote satirical poetry, and published the newspaper Dajti (Dajt).

Dalliu was part of the National Assembly in 1943. With the rise of the communists in power in 1944, he was arrested and imprisoned due to his engagement in politics and some sharp anti-communist poetry he had written. He died in jail on 25 May 1952, and was annihilated by the communist historiography.

== Works ==
- Grenxat e kuqe të Tiranës (Red wasps of Tirana), satirical poem, 1915.
- Texhvidi (Rules on reading the Quran), 1921.
- Ilmihali (Teachings on Islam).
- Besimet e muselmanëve, në vargje (Beliefs of the Muslims, in verses).
- Dhanti e Ramazanit (Gift of Ramadan), 1921.
- Dokrrat e hinit (Gibberish of ash), satirical poem, 1922.
- Ajka e kuptimeve të Kur'ani Qerimit (Top-meanings of Quran Karim'), partly published.
- Tefsiri i Kur-anit (The commentary of Quran), translation from Turkish of The commandment of God of Ömer Rıza Doğrul.
- Patriotizma në Tiranë (Patriotism in Tirana), 1930.
- E lemja dhe jeta e të madhit Muhamed (Birth and life of great Muhammad), poem of 6143 verses, 1934.
- Ç'është Islamizmi (What is Islamism), 1935.
- Udha Muhamedane (Tarikati Muhamedije) (Muhammadian road [Muhamadiyye Tariqat]) of Muhammed ibn Pīr 'Alī Bergivī ili Bergilī, translation, 1936.
- Libri i së falmes (Prayers book), 1937.
