= Madrasa of Tirana =

Islamic educational institution in Tirana, Albania

- Medreseja e Tiranës "Haxhi Mahmud Dashi"
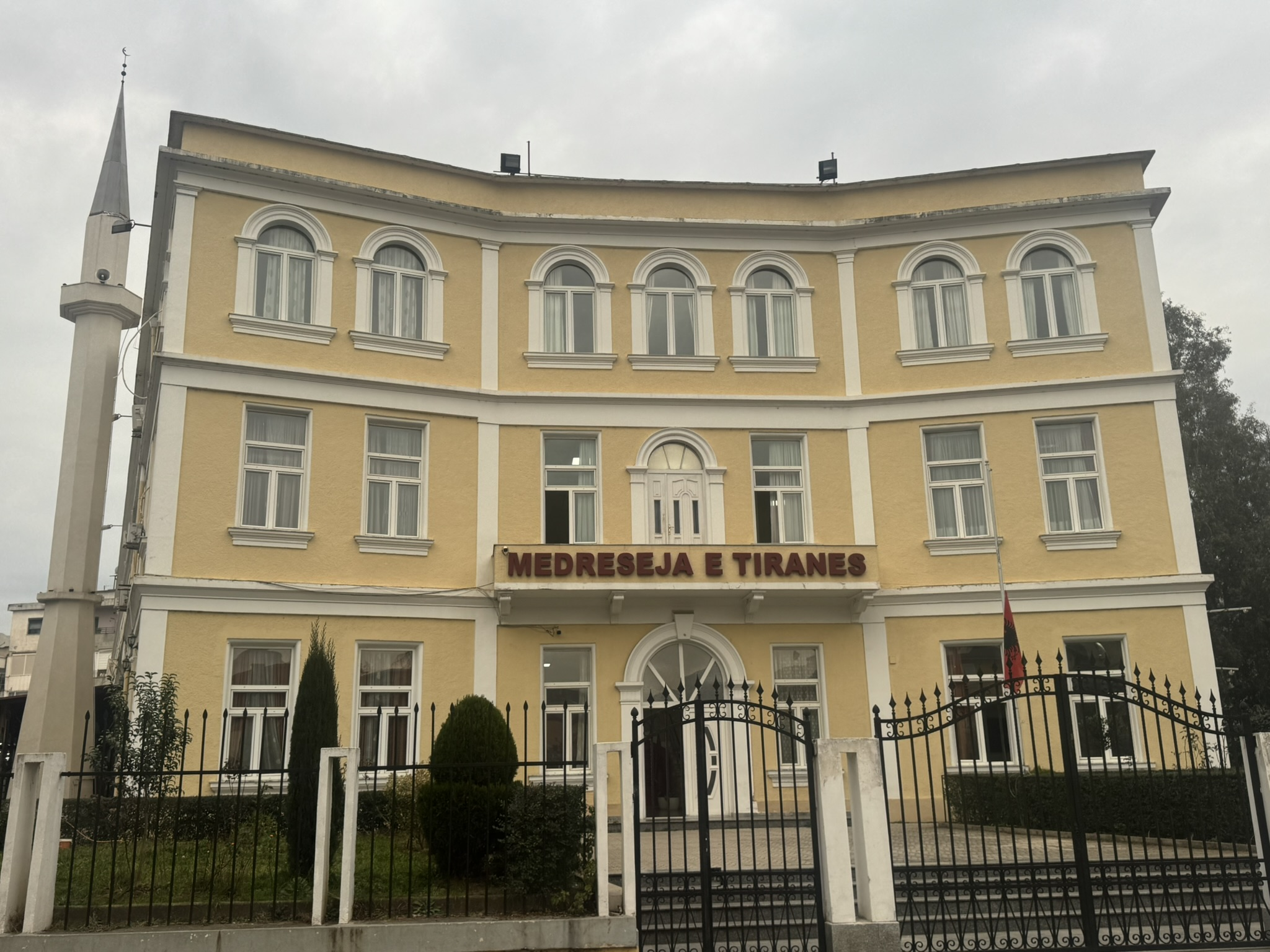

Location
- Tirana; Albania
- Coordinates: 41°20′19.4″N 19°49′34.9″E

Information
- Religious affiliation: Islamic
- Denomination: Sunni
- Established: March 1, 1924
- Status: Active
- Gender: Both
- Language: Albanian
- Campus type: Urban, closed
- Alumni: Vexhi Buharaja; Shaban Demiraj

The Madrasa of Tirana (Albanian: Medreseja e Tiranës), also known as the Medrese of Tirana and the Hadji Mahmud Dashi Madrasa, is an Islamic educational institution (madrasa) in Tirana, Albania. It was founded on March 1, 1924. It provides a curriculum that combines religious education with general studies.

== History ==
=== Establishment and development ===
On June 2, 1923, the General Directorate of Foundations informed the High Council of Sharia about the urgent need for a general madrasa, suggesting the rental of a suitable building in the capital due to insufficient community funds. They proposed accepting five students from each prefecture, with costs covered by local foundations, and outlined a three-tier education system: primary, high school, and university, each lasting four years. Wealthy students could also enroll at their own expense. The High Council of Sharia responded on June 4, 1923, approving the establishment of the madrasa and authorizing agreements with prefectures for student admissions and funding. By February 24, 1924, decision No. 34 stated the madrasa would begin with 24 students across three classes, directed by Qamil Bala and staffed by notable teachers.

The Madrasa of Tirana was officially inaugurated on March 1, 1924, by decision of the First Congress of Albanian Muslims and with permission from the Ministry of Education (No. 105/1, dated February 25, 1924). Established to meet the need for religious leaders, the school operated entirely with Albanian staff and implemented modern programs developed by Albanian theologians, funded by the revenues of the Albanian Muslim community. By April 1927, there were 12 madrasas across Albania, but by the Third Congress of Albanian Muslims in 1929, it was decided to consolidate the religious education system, retaining only the Madrasa of Tirana, which was referred to as the "General Madrasa." Initially located in Haqim Maçi's house near the Sulejman Pasha Mosque, the new madrasa was inaugurated on December 20, 1931. The building was celebrated by leaders including Mehdi Frashëri.

Within a few years, the Madrasa of Tirana formed its identity as a reputable institution that integrated a modern curriculum that included general education subjects alongside religious studies. It initially operated based on a contemporary educational plan. The curriculum of general culture subjects was intertwined with the subjects characterizing state high schools, such as language and literature, which were taught throughout the study period and had priority over other subjects. Madrasa students, taking advantage of religious and national holidays, developed extensive extracurricular activities – scientific and artistic, presenting them to a wide audience. Notable alumni contributed significantly to Albanian science and education, including Vexhi Buharaja and Shaban Demiraj.

=== Communist era ===
Following World War II, the reopening of the Tirana Madrasa after the liberation of the country was seen as a high priority by the leadership of the Muslim community of Albania. It was decided that the madrasa would resume regular classes after some repairs were made due to damage from the fighting. By the same decision, Hafëz Ismet Dibra was appointed director of the school. The Permanent Council of the Muslim Community of Albania, by decision No. 9, dated May 23, 1945, decided that the madrasa would reopen its doors on June 1, 1945.

Under the communist regime, the Madrasa of Tirana faced significant pressure following the educational reform of 1946, which curtailed religious subjects and imposed a secular curriculum resembling vocational training. The Ministry of Education's meeting on October 16, 1946, led to the closure of the primary school linked to the madrasa and a reduction in high school classes to four. Initially, the madrasa provided a dual education in general culture and religious studies. However, after the 1950s, state intervention intensified, with funding cuts and the replacement of religious staff with secular teachers. This shift included a focus on secular subjects like Darwinism, which conflicted with religious teachings. The regime persecuted many leaders and teachers at the madrasa, exemplified by the arrest of director Hafëz Ismet Dibra on December 11, 1946, for being a political opponent. Students also faced pressures, including forced military service and obstacles in pursuing higher education or finding employment. Despite reduced resources, students remained committed to their studies, and many teachers continued to uphold their faith through underground gatherings and private meetings.

Notable staff members included Hafëz Ismet Dibra, Jonuz Buliqi, Sheikh Qazim Hoxha, Haki Sharofi, Ibrahim Dalliu, and Ali Korça.

=== Reopening and modern era ===
After the fall of communism in the early 1990s, the madrasa was reopened as "Haxhi Mahmud Dashi" school on October 16, 1991. Despite initial struggles, the institution gradually established itself, offering a curriculum that integrated religious and general education.

The Madrasa of Tirana has modern facilities and a diverse student body. It emphasizes religious education and national identity. As of 2024, the institution has 328 students and offers programs designed to prepare future leaders of the Islamic community in Albania. The madradsa is managed by the Albanian Muslim community. It has opened its doors to various collaborations with international Islamic organizations, universities, and institutions of higher education.

The Madrasa of Tirana is classified as a monument of cultural heritage of the "Architecture" type and was officially approved as number "122" on March 5, 2007, by the Institute of Cultural Monuments (Instituti i Monumenteve të Kulturës).

On March 17, 2015, President Bujar Nishani honored the Madrasa of Tirana with the title "For Special Civil Merit". He recognized its significant role in providing high-level religious education and training a generation of Muslim theologians who contributed to the revival of national morality in Albania. Nishani also noted that the madrasa had been pivotal in promoting religious freedoms and fostering a morally and spiritually healthy society, while emphasizing the importance of integrating scientific knowledge with Islamic values. In March, Prime Minister Edi Rama delivered a speech during the 90th anniversary celebration of the madrasa. In his address, he emphasized the importance of the madrasa in promoting both religious education and national identity.

On January 24, 2020, Tirana's Mayor Erion Veliaj announced the transformation of the area near the madrasa into a public recreational space. The change was part of a broader initiative to celebrate the city's 100th anniversary by restoring important landmarks to their original purpose.

In 2024, it was reported that Turkish President Erdoğan was pressuring Albanian prime minister Edi Rama to transfer control of the Madrasa of Tirana to a state foundation linked to his government. This foundation was reported to be taking over schools associated with Fethullah Gülen, a controversial cleric whose movement has been accused of plotting a coup in Turkey. The demand raised concerns about foreign interference in Albania's religious affairs.

== See also ==
- Islam in Albania
- Namazgah Mosque
- Et'hem Bey Mosque
