= Hafiz Ali Korça =

Albanian Islamic scholar

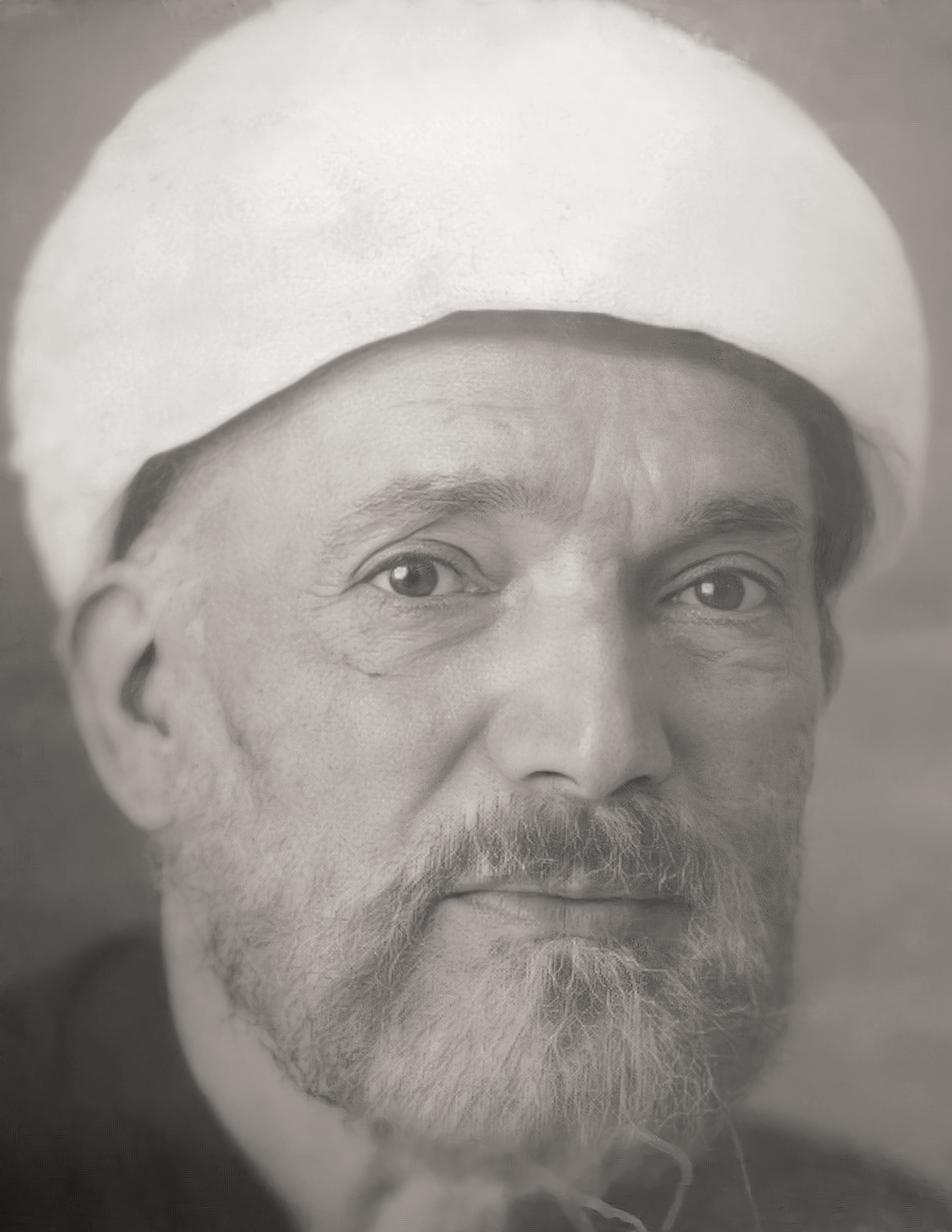
- Title: Grand Mufti

Personal life
- Born: April 5, 1873 Korça, Ottoman Empire
- Died: 31 December 1957 (aged 84) Kavajë, Communist Albania
- Education: Istanbul University

Religious life
- Religion: Islam
- Denomination: Sunni
- Jurisprudence: Hanafi
- Creed: Maturidi

Muslim leader
- Post: Grand Mufti of the upper Sharia Council (later became the Muslim Community of Albania)
- Period in office: 1916-1924

Hafiz Ali Korça (1873 – December 31, 1957) was an Albanian Muslim Alim, Hafiz, Grand Mufti and theologian. He is remembered as the first Albanian to critique communism through his work “Bolshevizma ç’katrrimi njerzise” (“Bolshevism: The Destruction of Humanity”).

== Life ==
Hafiz Ali was born on April 5, 1873, in Korçë, to a religious family. His father, Iljaz Efendi, was a respected figure in the community. By age 12, Hafiz Ali memorized the Quran, earning the title of hafiz and starting his lifelong dedication to Islamic learning.

After finishing primary school, Hafiz Ali went to secondary school in Korçë. He continued his education at the University of Istanbul, an important place for Albanian intellectuals. His time in Istanbul had a big impact on his religious and intellectual growth. He studied Islamic subjects, learned Arabic and Persian, and improved his Turkish. Hafiz Ali also studied French in Korçë, which allowed him to read French literary works.

During his time in Istanbul, Hafiz Ali studied the works of thinkers like Ibn Rushd, Ibn Sina, Ibn Rumi, and Omar Khayyam. These studies deepened his knowledge in philosophy, sociology, and literature.

After graduating as a theologian, Hafiz Ali returned to Albania and played an important role in the 1909 Congress of Elbasan, contributing to the founding of the Progress Society. Under its program, he helped establish a primary school in Korçë and introduced foreign language studies. He also participated in the Congress of Dibër, advocating for more Albanian-language schools.

In 1916, he became director of education for Tirana, Durrës, and Central Albania.

Hafiz Ali supported the Albanian Latin alphabet, earning the nickname "Hoxhë Latinxhi" ("Imam of the Latin Alphabet") from the Ottomans, who criticized his stance.

He was the first Albanian to publicly criticize communism in his book Bolshevism: The Destruction of Humanity, where he condemned the communist ideology.

== Religious work ==
After his studies, Hafiz Ali Korça focused on Islamic teachings and made contributions by writing and translating key Islamic texts. His major achievement was translating parts of the Quran into Albanian, published in 1926. He was appointed Grand Mufti of the Upper Sharia Council in 1916, serving until 1924. He also taught at the Medrese of Tirana, where he contributed to religious education. Beyond Islamic work, he contributed to both Islamic and non-Islamic literature, influencing the cultural and intellectual environment of his time.

== Persecution under the Communist Regime ==
Hafiz Ali Korça faced significant persecution under the communist regime. He was interned in Kavajë and closely monitored by the Sigurimi until his old age. Despite his prominent role in the national sphere, the regime considered him a threat due to his religious views and subjected him to continuous surveillance, limiting his freedom and activities. This surveillance continued until he was in his 80s.

== Death ==
Hafiz Ali Korça died on December 31, 1957, in Kavajë, where he was also buried. Despite the official silence from the government, a large number of Kavajë residents attended his funeral, giving him a grand farewell.

== Works ==
Hafiz Ali made significant contributions to both Islamic and Albanian literature. Below is a list of his notable works:

- Mevludi (1900) - The Mawlid
- 303 fjalë të Imam Aliut - 303 Saying of Imam Ali
- Gjylistani dhe Bostani i Saadiut (1918) - The Rose Garden and Orchard of Saadi
- Rubajiat e Hajamit (1930) - The Rubaiyat of Khayyam
- Bolshevizma a çkatërrim i njerëzimit (1925) - Bolshevism: The Destruction of Humanity
- Shtatë Ëndrrat e Shqipërisë - The Seven Dreams of Albania
- Histori në vargje - History in Verses

== See also ==
- Islam in Albania
- Muslim Community of Albania
