= Muslim Community of Albania =

Islamic organization in Albania

- Komuniteti Mysliman i Shqipërisë
- Formation: 24 February 1923; 103 years ago
- Type: Religious organization
- Headquarters: Tirana, Albania
- Official language: Albanian
- Grand Mufti: Bujar Spahiu
- Website: kmsh.al

The Muslim Community of Albania (KMSH; Albanian: Komuniteti Mysliman i Shqipërisë) is an independent religious organisation of Muslims in Albania existing since February 24, 1923. The headquarters of the community are located in Tirana and the current Grand Mufti (Albanian: Kryemyftiu) is Bujar Spahiu.

== History ==
Organized Islamic religious life in Albania has existed since the time the Ottoman Empire started administering this region. All Muslims who lived in the Ottoman Empire were part of the Muslim community headed by the Sultan, who replaced the role of the caliph. During the reign of the Sultan Murad II the competencies of the caliph were transferred to the grand mufti. Since then, the grand mufti was titled Sheykhul-Islam and was considered the highest religious authority within the Ottoman Empire. However, every region inhabited by Muslims had its own mufti, who was in a lower position than the Sheykhul-Islam. After the independence of Albania in 1912 the Islamic Community of Albania continued to be under the authority of the Sheykhul-Islam in Constantinople until 1923. The Albanian Muslims organized themselves under the name of Upper Sharia Council led by Hafiz Ali Korça from 1916 to 1924. In 1923, following the government program, the Albanian Muslim congress convened at Tirana decided to break with the Caliphate (Sheykhul-Islam), and created the Muslim Community of Albania.

During the period from 1941 to 1944 the Islamic Community of Kosova was under the authority of the Muslim Community of Albania. The community would be active until 1967, when the communist regime of Enver Hoxha declared Albania the only non-religious country in the world, banning all forms of religious practice in public. After the fall of communism, on November 16, 1990, the Muslim Community of Albania was re-established under the Grand Mufti Hafiz Sabri Koçi.

With the beginning of the war on terror by George W. Bush, most Arab NGOs funding the institutions of the KMSH were driven out of the country or had to reduce their activity. Since then, Turkish organisations - mainly those that are close to the spiritual preacher Fethullah Gülen based in the United States - took control over it. The Gülen movement controls five out of seven madrasas in the country. The election of Skënder Bruçaj to head the KMSH was marred by controversy. Some imams and other Muslim clerics viewed it as illegal that contravened the rules of KMSH and regarded his elevation to the position as a coup by the Gülen movement.

On 26 November 2019, an earthquake struck Albania. The Muslim Community of Albania organised nationwide fundraising for monetary, food and material supplies and opened its mosques and madrasas as a place of shelter for earthquake victims.

== Grand Muftis (1923–present) ==
No.	Portrait	Name	Term in office	
1		Vehbi Dibra (1867–1937)	12 March 1923	1929
1		Vehbi Dibra (1867–1937)	5 or 6 years	
2		Behxhet Shapati (1875–1950)	3 August 1929	1942
2		Behxhet Shapati (1875–1950)	12 or 13 years	
3		Sherif Langu (1877–1956)	1942	1945
3		Sherif Langu (1877–1956)	2 or 3 years	
4		Musa H. Aliu (1892–1977)	1945	1954
4		Musa H. Aliu (1892–1977)	8 or 9 years	
5		Sulejman Myrtoj ( )	1954	1966
5		Sulejman Myrtoj ( )	11 or 12 years	
6		Esat Myftia (1911–1975)	1966	13 November 1967
6		Esat Myftia (1911–1975)	0 or 1 year	
7		Hafiz Sabri Koçi (1921–2004)	14 February 1991	17 March 2004
7		Hafiz Sabri Koçi (1921–2004)	12 years, 1 month and 3 days	
8		Selim Muça (1936–2016)	17 March 2004	8 March 2014
8		Selim Muça (1936–2016)	9 years, 11 months and 19 days	
9		Skënder Bruçaj (1976)	8 March 2014	2 March 2019
9		Skënder Bruçaj (1976)	4 years, 11 months and 22 days	
10		Bujar Spahiu (1976)	2 March 2019	Incumbent
10		Bujar Spahiu (1976)	7 years, 4 months and 24 days	

== See also ==
- Islam in Albania
- Islamic Community of Kosovo
