= Church of Saint Demetrius =

Church of Saint Demetrius or St. Demetrius' Church may refer to:

== Albania ==
- St. Demetrius' Church, Boboshticë (Kisha e Shën Mitrit, Boboshticë)
- St. Demetrius' Church, Drobonik (Kisha e Shën Mitrit, Debranik)
- St. Demetrius' Church, Poliçan (Kisha e Shën Mitrit, Poliçan)
- St. Demetrius' Monastery Church, Qeparo (Kisha e Manastirit të Shën Mitrit, Qeparo)
- St. Demetrius' Church, Tuminec (Kisha e Shën Mitrit, Bezmisht)

== Bulgaria ==
- Church of St Demetrius, Boboshevo
- Church of St Demetrius, Patalenitsa
- Church of St Demetrius of Thessaloniki, Veliko Tarnovo

== Romania ==
- Cathedral of Saint Demetrius, Craiova
- Saint Demetrius Church, Focșani

== Others ==
- Hagios Demetrios, a World Heritage Site in Thessaloniki, Greece
- Church of Saint Demetrius, Budapest, Hungary
- Church of Saint Demetrius in Kosovska Mitrovica, Kosovo
- St Demetrius Chapel, Għarb, Malta
- Cathedral of Saint Demetrius, Vladimir, Russia
- Cathedral Church of St Andrew and St Demetrius, Madrid, Spain
- St. Demetrios Greek Orthodox Church (Seattle), United States
- Church of Saint Demetrius, Constantinopel, destroyed orthodox church in Constantinopel
