= St. Athanasius' Church =

St. Athanasius' Church or variations may refer to:

== Albania ==
- St. Athanasius' Monastery Church, Leshnicë e Poshtme
- St. Athanasius Church, Moscopole
- St. Athanasius' Monastery Church, Erind

== Bulgaria ==
- Church of St Athanasius, Boboshevo
- Monastery of Saint Athanasius, Chirpan

== Greece ==
- Church of St. Athanasius of Mouzaki, Kastoria
- Church of St Athanasius, Thessaloniki

== Italy ==
- Sant'Atanasio, Rome
- Sant'Atanasio a Via Tiburtina, Rome

== United States ==
- St. Athanasius Episcopal Church and Parish House and the Church of the Holy Comforter, Burlington, North Carolina
- St. Athanasius Church (Bronx)
