= Velev =

Velev (masculine, Bulgarian: Велев) or Veleva (feminine, Bulgarian: Велева) is a Bulgarian surname. Notable people with the surname include:

- Emil Velev (born 1962), Bulgarian footballer and manager
- Milen Velev (born 1971), Bulgarian tennis player
- Milenko Velev, Bulgarian architect
- Stefan Velev (born 1989), Bulgarian footballer
- Vasil Velev (born 1984), Bulgarian footballer
- Vyacheslav Velyev (born 2000), Ukrainian footballer of Bulgarian descent
