= Church of the Holy Mother of God, Boboshevo =

Church in Kyustendil, Bulgaria

Coordinates: 42°09′08″N 23°00′00″E

The Church of the Holy Mother of God (Bulgarian: Църква Света Богородица) is a Bulgarian National Revival church in the town of Boboshevo, Kyustendil Province.

== Location, history, architectural and artistic features ==
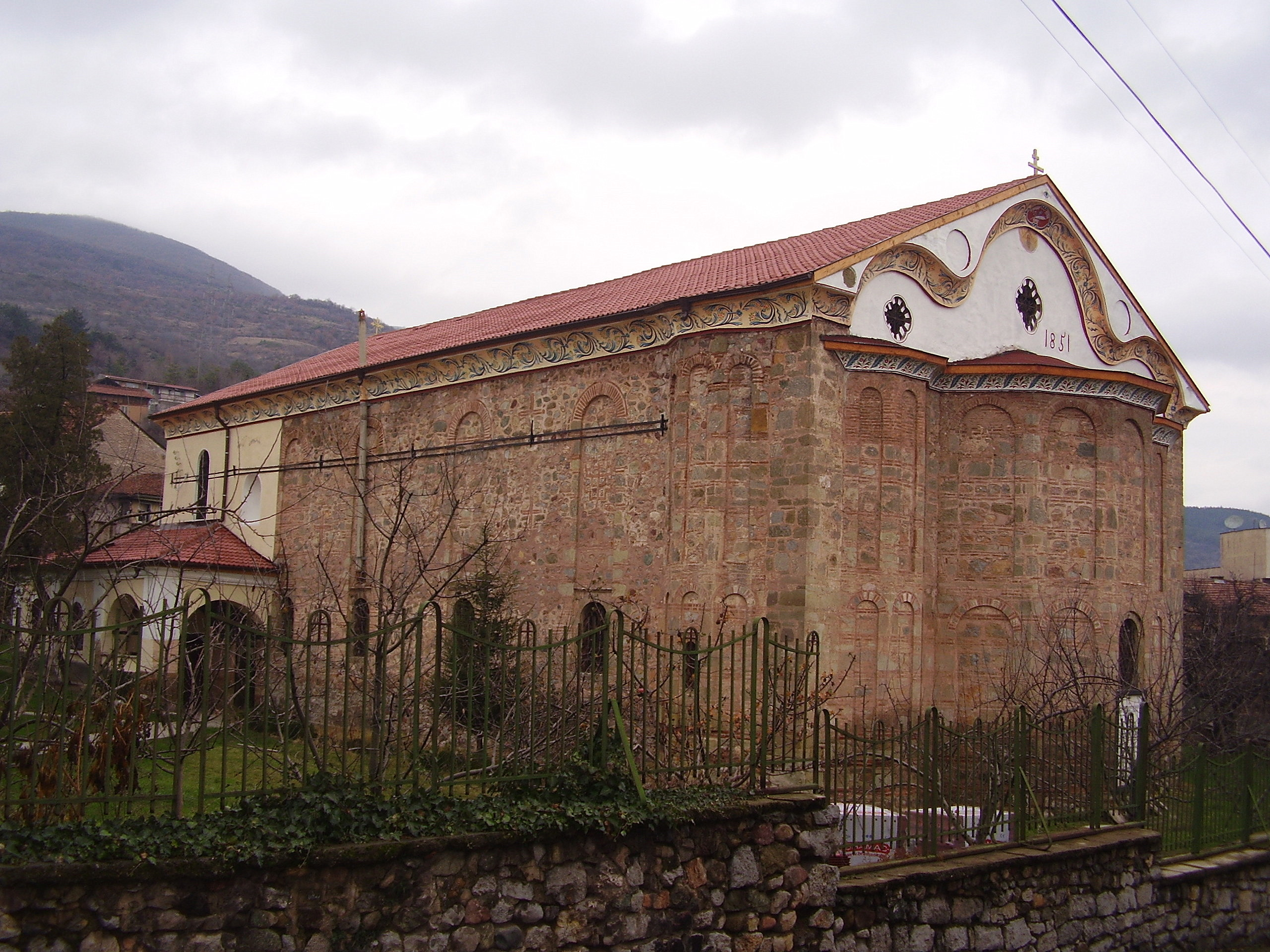
The Church of the Holy Mother of God in Boboshevo

The church is situated in the center of Boboshevo. It is considered among the most beautiful National Revival churches in the Kyustendil Province, western Bulgaria. It has an unusual architecture which resembles the Rila Monastery.

It is built by carved stone with brick layers and in the interior there are ten columns. It is a three nave basilica. The church is 24 m long, 8 m wide and 10 m high. The roof is covered with tiles. In the interior there is a second floor which forms the female compartment which can contain 150 people, while on the first floor the church can hold more than 650 worshipers. The floor was covered with large square bricks but in 1923 they were replaced with mosaics. The edifice has three large doors made of oak. From the west and south there used to be a covered narthex. Initially the belfry used to be part of the church building raising from the south-western part of the female compartment. On 2 March 1904 an earthquake destroyed the belfry and the western narthex. In 1907 another belfry was constructed in the southern part of the church yard.

The construction of the church began in the spring of 1851 and finished a decade later in 1862. According to contemporary accounts, the construction of a large church was needed because the existing churches which were small could not hold all people. It was built by Milenko Velev from the village of Blateshnitsa near the town of Radomir who constructed the southern wing of the Rila Monastery.

The naos, the altar and the gallery of the second floor were entirely painted. The painting of the large church was awarded to the famous National Revival painted Stanislav Dospevski who was assisted by his brothers Nikola and Zahari Dospevski. Many other painters from Samokov and Razlog including the local painter Georgi Veselinov – Zograf took part in the work. Part of the frescoes (1890–1898) were painted by Dimitar Sirleshtov and his apprentice Kostadin Hadzhi Popov.

The church was solemnly inaugurated on 29 October 1862 in the presence of the whole population, people from the nearby villages and representatives from Kyustendil, Dupnitsa, Samokov and Blagoevgrad.

The church is named after Holy Mary, the mother of Jesus Christ and wife of the carpenter Saint Joseph. She is also known as Saint Mary, Virgin Mary, Madonna and is the most celebrated Christian saint.

== Literature ==
- Кепов, Иван - Миналото и сегашно на Бобошево. 1935, 288 с., издава Бобошевска популярна банка, печатница Кехлибар, с.192–206;
- Заедно по свещените места на планината Осогово. Пътеводител, София, 2008 г., изд.РИМ - Кюстендил, печат.Дийор Принт ООД, с.108;
