= Georgi Veselinov – Zograf =

Georgi Veselinov - Zograf
- Born: 1843; Boboshevo, Ottoman Empire
- Died: 19 September 1886 (aged 42–43); Dupnitsa, Bulgaria
- Known for: Painter

Georgi Ivanov Veselinov - Zograf (Bulgarian: Георги Иванов Веселинов - Зограф; 1843 – 19 September 1886) was a Bulgarian National Revival painter, public figure and deputy in the II and III National Assembly.

== Biography ==
He was born in 1843 in Boboshevo in the family of Yuvancho Veselinov and Milena Vasilkyova. He graduated the school in his home town. In 1861 he went to Razlog where he studied icon painting from the painter Stefan Popstamatov who was an apprentice of Simeon Molerov. When he returned to Boboshevo he took part in the painting of the Church of the Holy Mother of God and became known as Georgi Zograf. In 1868 he painted the church in the village of Balanovo. In 1873 he painted the vaults in the southern side of the narthex in the Church of the Holy Mother of God.

After the crushing of the April Uprising he was suspected for being a rebel and arrested in Dupnitsa and then imprisoned in Sofia. After the Liberation of Bulgaria he was appointed in the Agricultural fund in Dupnitsa and remained in the position until his death. He became one of the leaders of the Liberal Party in the region of Dupnitsa and made many enemies among the rich russophiles in Dupnitsa. He was elected twice as a deputy in the II (10 December 1882 – 25 December 1883) and ІІІ (9 July 1884 – 11 July 1886) National Assembly. He was enlisted for the IV National Assembly but on 19 September 1886 he was assaulted and killed by the mob along with the other candidate of the Liberal Party Hr. Grancharov, the district head P. Dimitrov and the teacher from Boboshevo Papukchiev.

== Literature ==
- Кепов, Иван, „Миналото и сегашно на Бобошево“, издава Бобошевска популярна банка, печатница Кехлибар, 1935, с.255-259.
