= Church of Saint Theodore, Boboshevo =

Church in Kyustendil, Bulgaria

Coordinates: 42°09′47″N 22°59′32″E

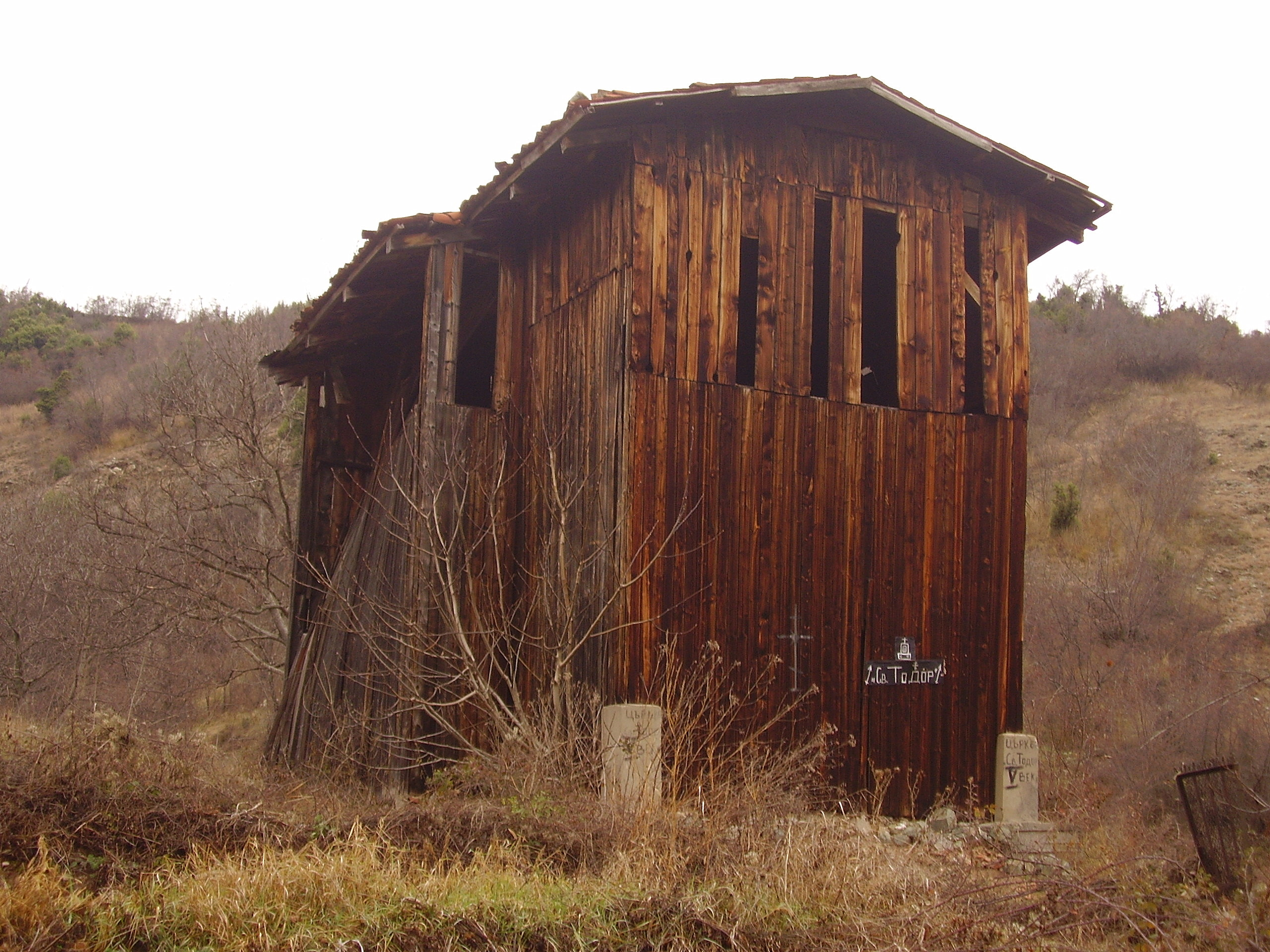
The wooden structure in which the church is wrapped

The Church of Saint Theodore (Bulgarian: Църква Свети Тодор) is a Medieval Bulgarian church near the town of Boboshevo, Kyustendil Province.

== Location, history, architectural and artistic features ==
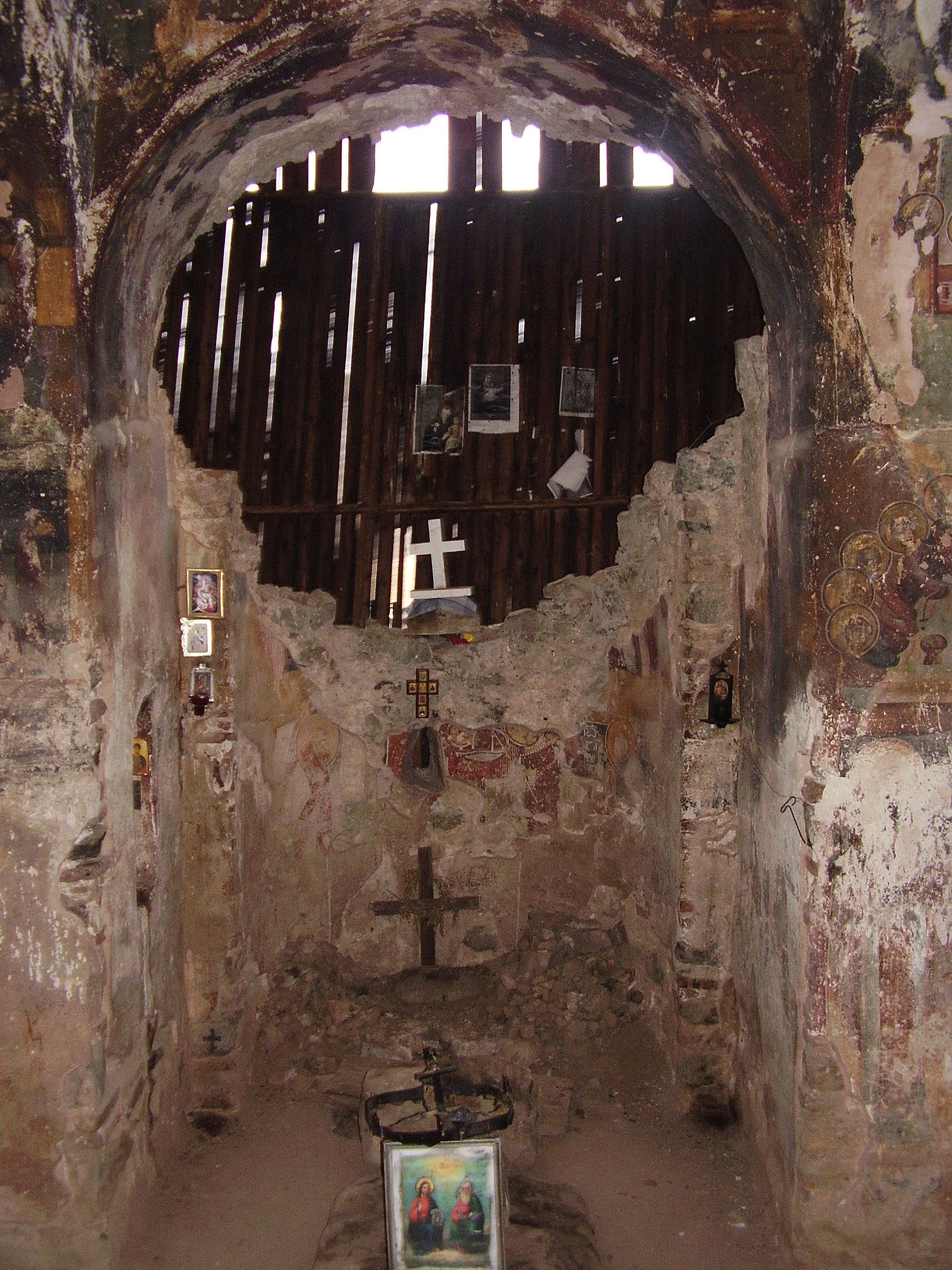
The Church of St Theodore

The church is situated at 2 km to the north of Boboshevo on a hill on the right bank of the Struma River in the locality of Selishte. It is a cross-domed church; its length is 7,40 m and the width is 6,21 m. The semi-round apse has a long and narrow window. The dome used to be on a cylinder and had four windows. The church was constructed with stones while the dome and the arcs were made of bricks. In the dome some of the brick layers plastered up creating an effective decoration. On the walls two layers of frescoes have been preserved. The frescoes from the earlier layer are destroyed and those from the second one are precious works of the Medieval Bulgarian painting. Partly preserved are scenes from the Last Supper, Washing of the Feet, Prayer in the Gestimen garden, Betrayal of Jesus by Judas and others. The scientists have not reached agreement on the dating of the church - V. Mikov refers it to the 13th-14th century, N. Mawrodinov to the 12th century and the D. Panayotova to the first quarter of the 11th century with the frescoes from the second layer to the first half of the 14th century. It is among Bulgaria's oldest churches of the so-called unrestricted cross type. The church is even more unusual after it was wrapped in a wooden structure in 1962 before its full restoration.

The church was declared an architectural-artistic monument of culture of national importance (DV, is.39/1972).

The church was named after Saint Theodore - either after Theodore of Amasea or Theodore Stratelates.

== Literature ==
- Миков, В. - Църквата "Св.Тодор" - Известия на Археологическия Институт (Mikov, V. - The Church St Todor - Notices of the Institute of Archaeology), V, 1928-1929 г., с.33;
- Мавродинов, Никола - Външната украса на старобългарските църкви - Известия на Археологическия Институт (Mavrodinov, Nikola - Outer decoration of the old Bulgarian churches - Notices of the Institute of Archaeology), VIIІ, 1934 г., с.61;
- Кепов, Иван - Миналото и сегашно на Бобошево. (Kepov, Ivan - The past and present of Boboshevo) 1935, 288 с., издава Бобошевска популярна банка, печатница Кехлибар, с. 188–191;
- Миятев, Кр. - Архитектурата в Средновековна България (Miyatev, Kr. - Architecture in Medieval Bulgaria), С. 1965, 250 с., с.190;
- Панайотова, Д. - Църквата Св.Тодор при Бобошево - Известия на Института за изобразителни изкуства (Panayotova, D. - The Church of St Todor near Boboshevo - Notices of the Institute of Fine Arts), VII, 1964 г., с.101 и сл.;
- Василиев, Асен - Проучвания на изобразителните изкуства из някои селища по долината на Струма. - Известия на Института за изобразителни изкуства (Vasilev, Asen - Studies of the fine arts in some settlements in the Struma valley - Notices of the Institute of Fine Arts), VII, 1964 г., с.154-155;
- Марди, В. - Бабикова - Научно мотивирано предложение за обявяване на църквата "Св.Тодор" при с.Бобошево, Кюстендилско за паметник на културата (Mardi, V. - Babikova - Scientifically motivated proposal for declaration of the Church of St Todor near the village of Boboshevo, Kyustendil region for a monument of culture). София, 1969 г., 12 с., Архив НИПК;
- Дремсизова-Нелчинова, Цв. и Слокоска, Л. - Археологически паметници от Кюстендилски окръг (Dremsizova-Nelchinova, Tsv. and Slokoska, L. - Archaeological monuments of the Kyustendil Province), София, 1978 г., с.13;
- Заедно по свещените места на планината Осогово. Пътеводител (Together in the holy places of the Osogovo mountain. Guidebook), София, 2008 г., изд.РИМ - Кюстендил, печат.Дийор Принт ООД, с.104-105;

== Gallery ==
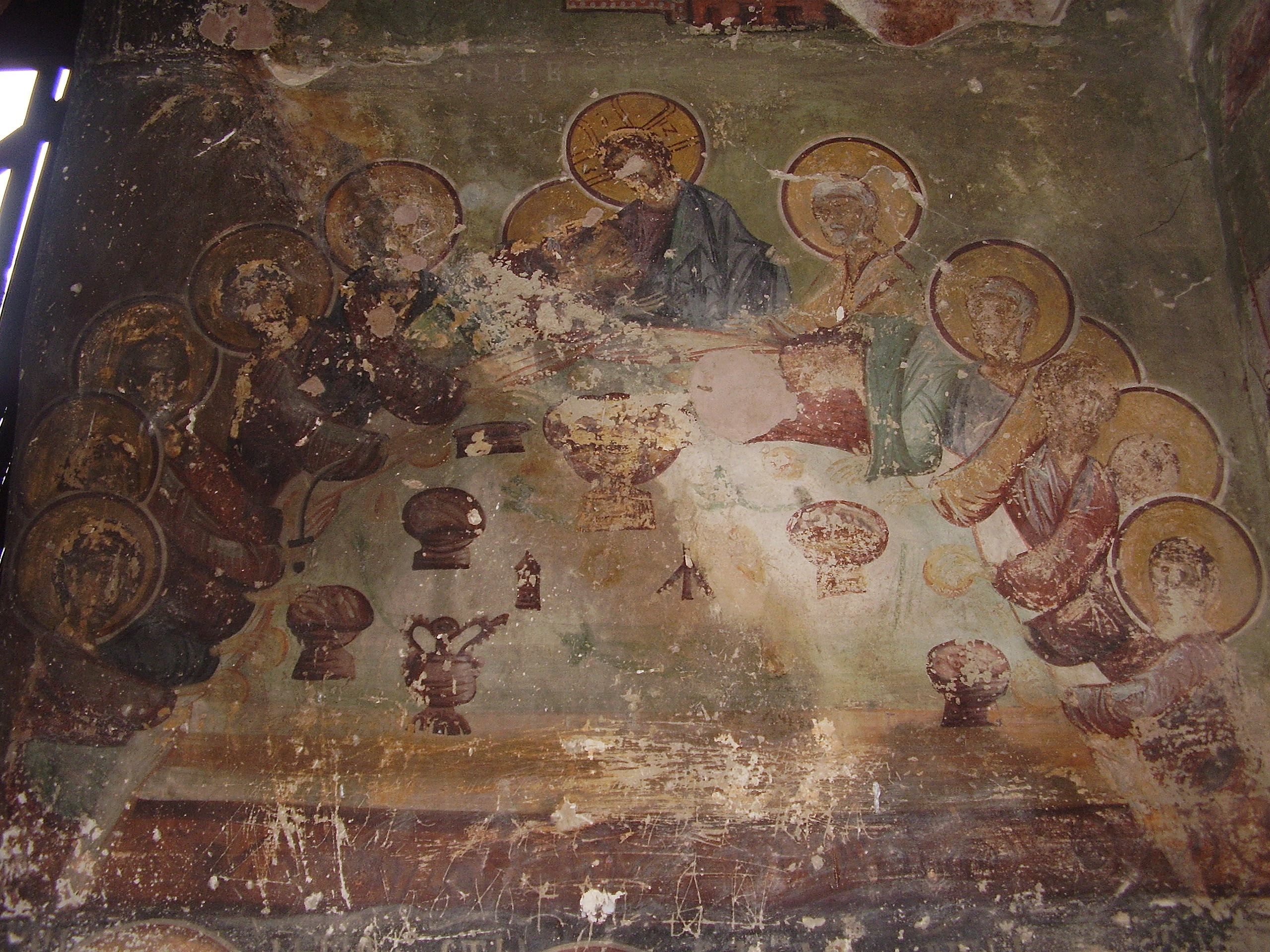

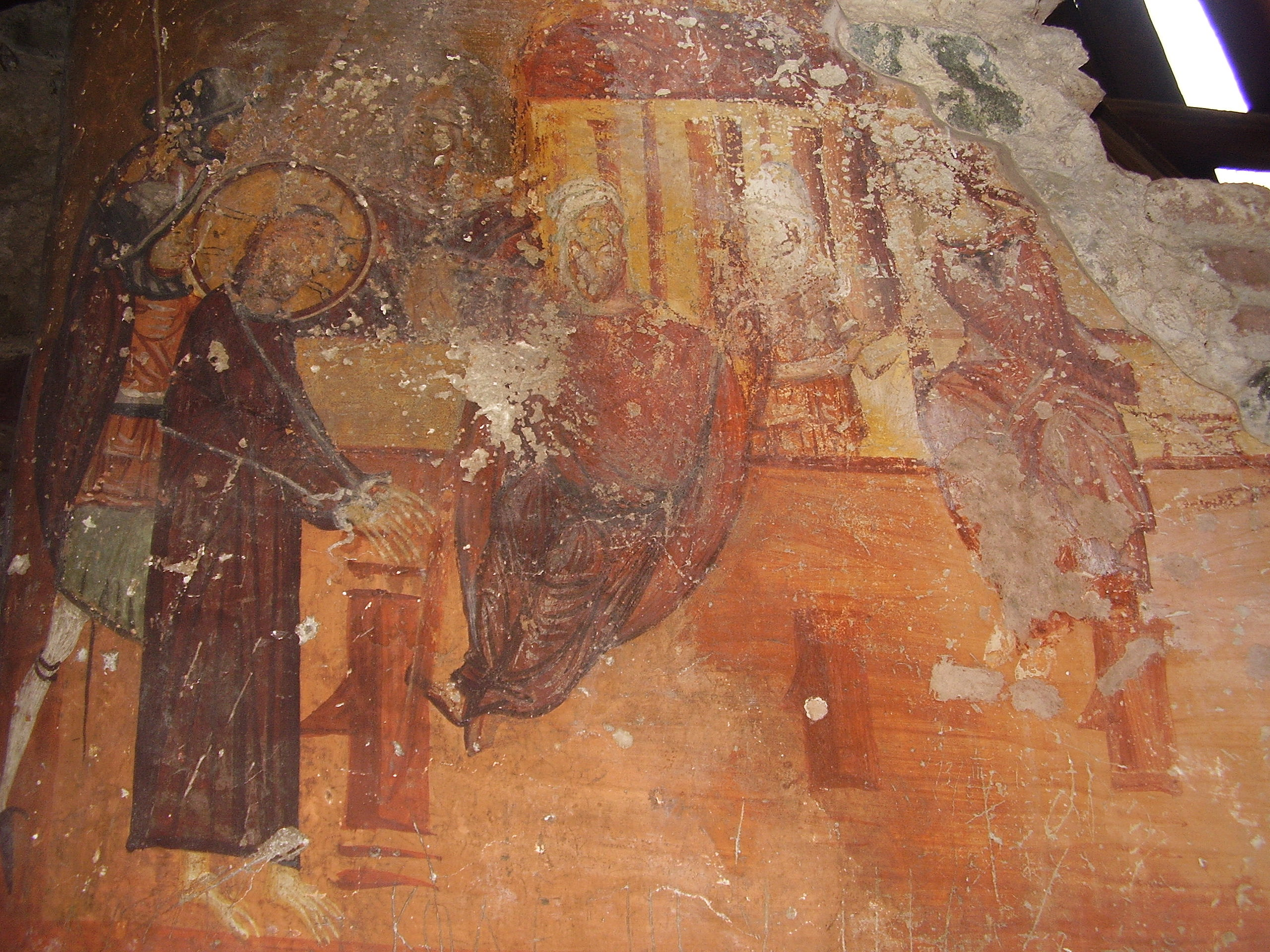

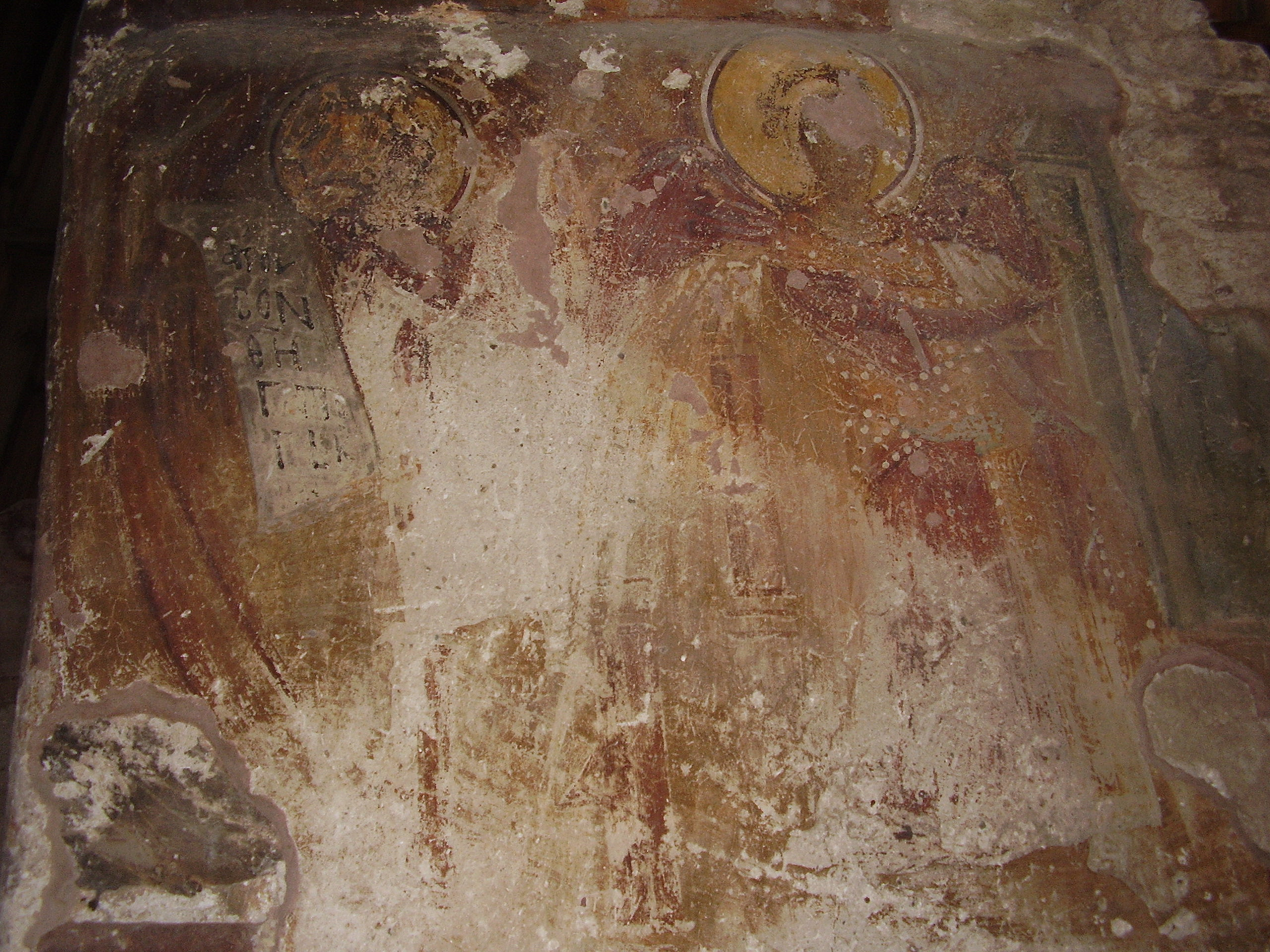

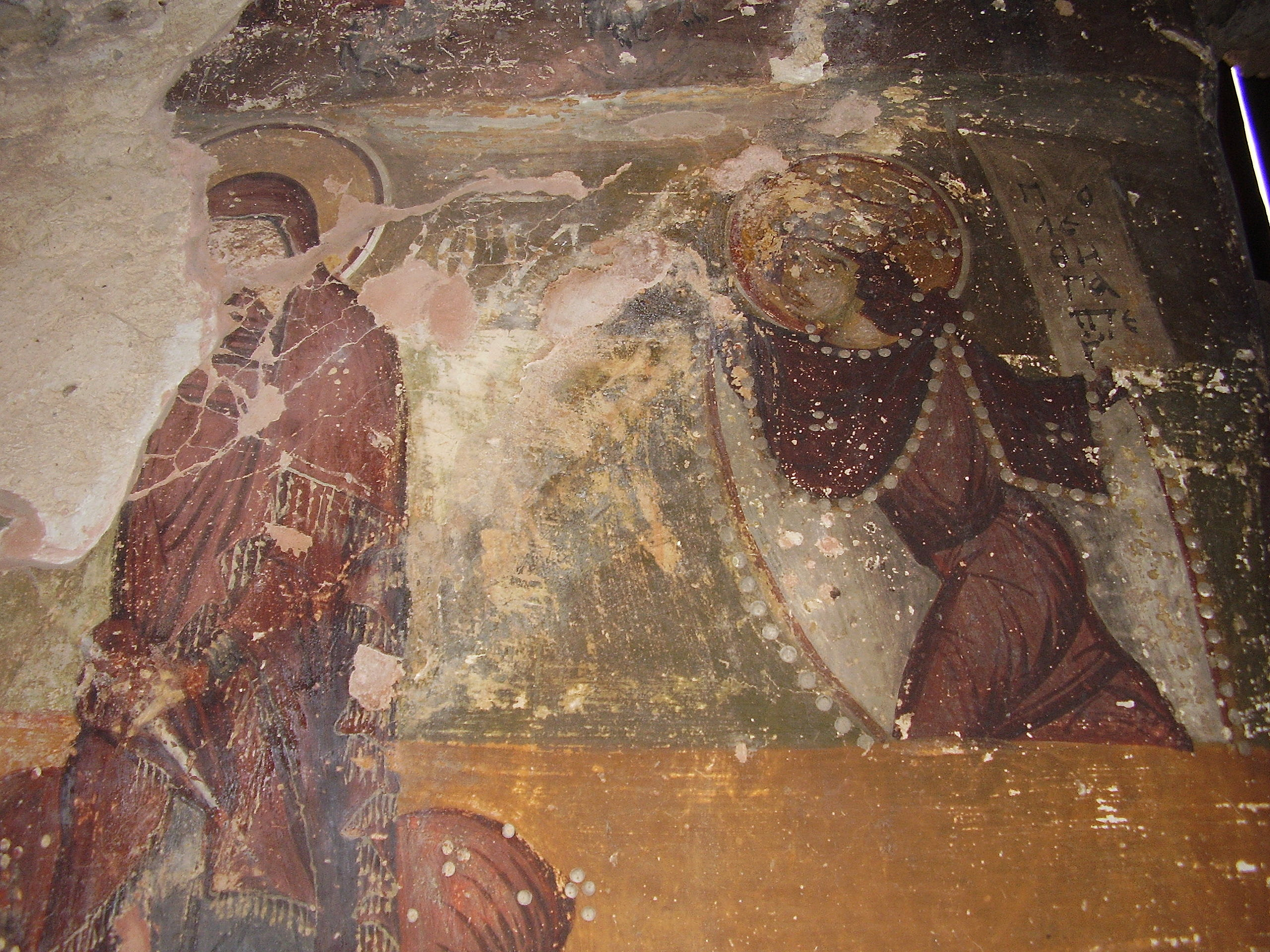
