= Church of St Elijah, Boboshevo =

Church in Kyustendil, Bulgaria

Coordinates: 42°09′07″N 23°00′32″E

The Church of St Elijah (Bulgarian: Църква Свети Илия) is a late Medieval Bulgarian church in the town of Boboshevo, Kyustendil Province.

== Location, history, architectural and artistic features ==
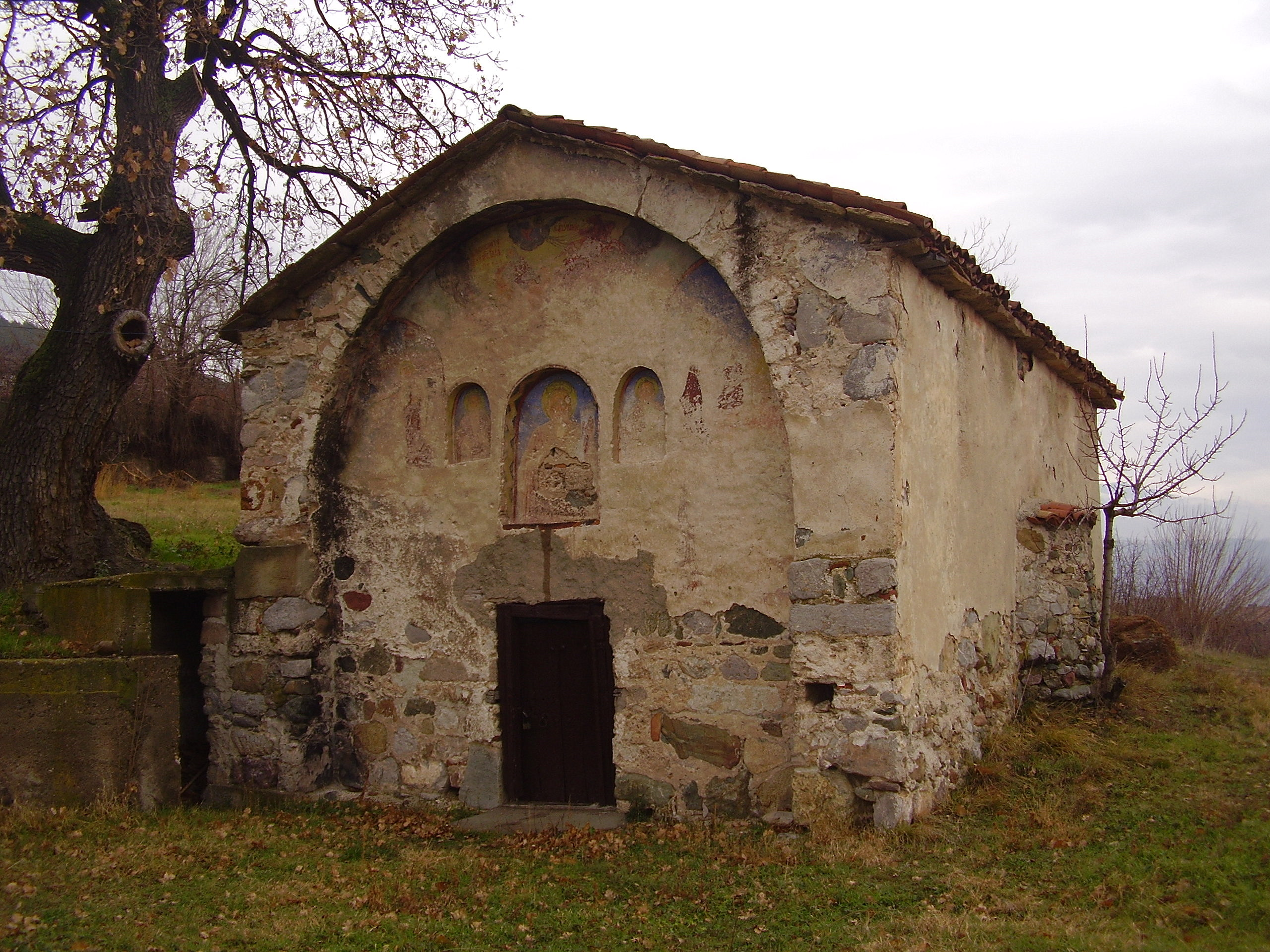
The church of St Elijah in Boboshevo

The church was constructed in 1687. It is located in the eastern part of Boboshevo, near the Byalata Prast locality. It is a small one nave and one apse church with a length of 7.20 m (23.6 ft) and width of 5.30 m (17.4 ft) without the apse. The eastern facade has an arched niche and the western three niches. The church was constructed of stones with plaster. Large part of the frescoes which used to cover the whole interior has been preserved. The earlier frescoes (on the vault and the upper sections walls) date from the 17th century, and the later from 1898 according to the ktitor inscription above the apse niche. The decorative system of the frescoes is characteristic for the one nave medieval churches in the Balkans. On the vault are depicted Christ and the prophets from the Old Testimony in two friezes, on the arms of the vault and on the walls there are scenes from the Gospels. Under them there is a layer of medallions with images of saints and to the bottom the used to be full-length portraits of saints and a baseboard which are now destroyed. The iconostasis dates from the 17th century and is almost fully preserved.

The church is an architectural monument of culture of local significance (DV is.77/1972) and an architectural-artistic monument of national importance (DV is.38/1972).

The church is named after Elijah (in Bulgarian Sveti Iliya).

== Literature ==
- Кепов, Иван - Миналото и сегашно на Бобошево. 1935, 288 с., с.191;
- Василиев, Асен - Проучвания на изобразителните изкуства из някои селища по долината на Струма. - Известия на Института за изобразителни изкуства, VII, 1964 г., с.155 - 157;
- Марди, В. - Бабикова - Научно мотивирано предложение за обявяване на църквата "Св.Илия" в с.Бобошево, Кюстендилско за паметник на културата. София, 1969 г., 20 с., Архив НИПК;
- Дремсизова-Нелчинова, Цв. и Слокоска, Л. - Археологически паметници от Кюстендилски окръг, София, 1978 г., с.14;
- Флорева, Елена - Църквата "Пророк Илия" в Бобошево, София, 1978 г., изд."Български художник", 165 стр.;
- Ангелов, Светозар - Църквата "Пророк Илия" в гр.Бобошево, Дупнишко. В : Църкви и манастири от Югозападна България през XV- XVII в., София, ЦСВП "Проф.Иван Дуйчев" към СУ"Св.Климент Охридски", 2007 г., с.41-2;
- Заедно по свещените места на планината Осогово. Пътеводител, София, 2008 г., изд.РИМ - Кюстендил, печат.Дийор Принт ООД, с.106;

== Gallery ==
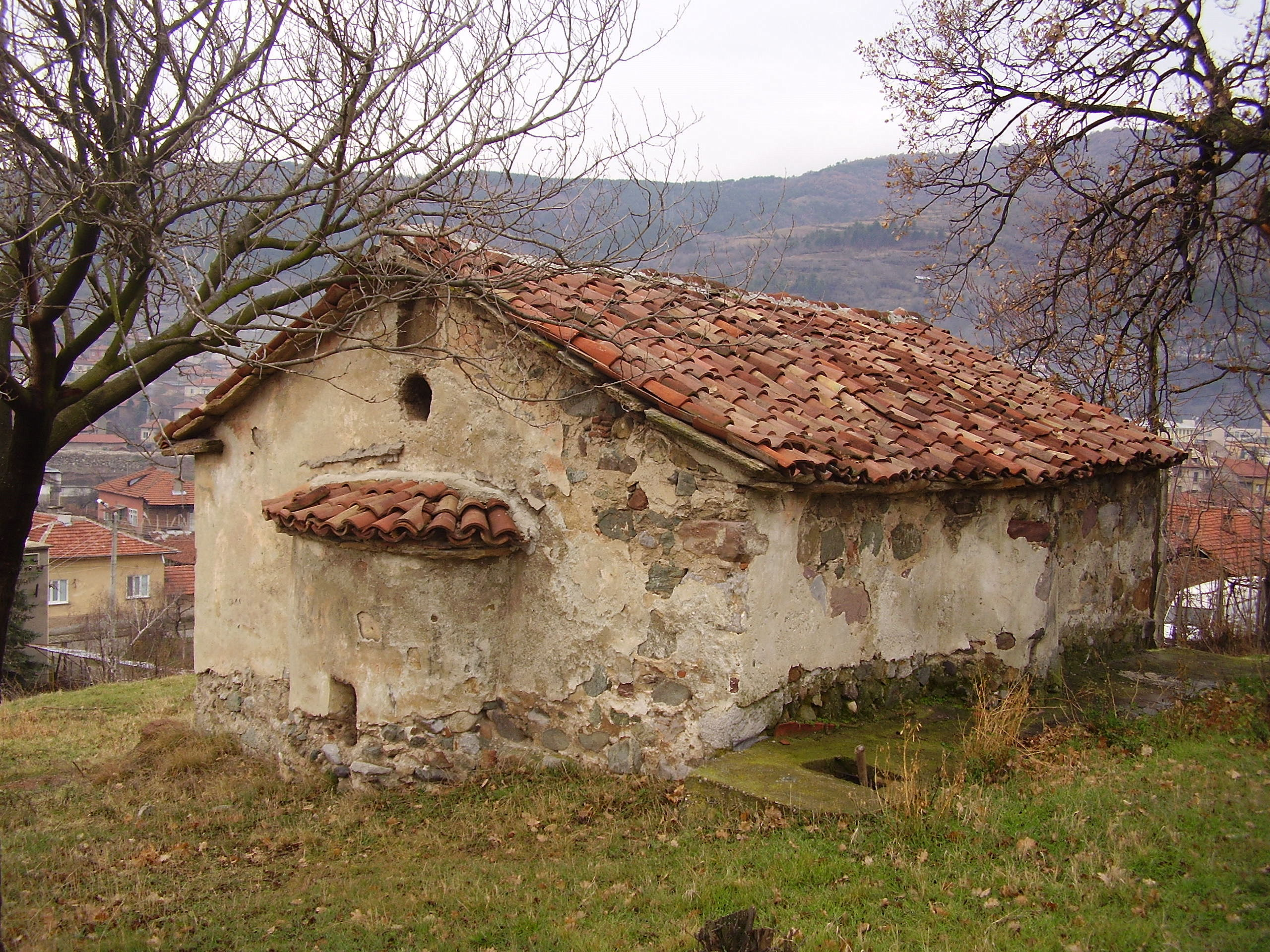

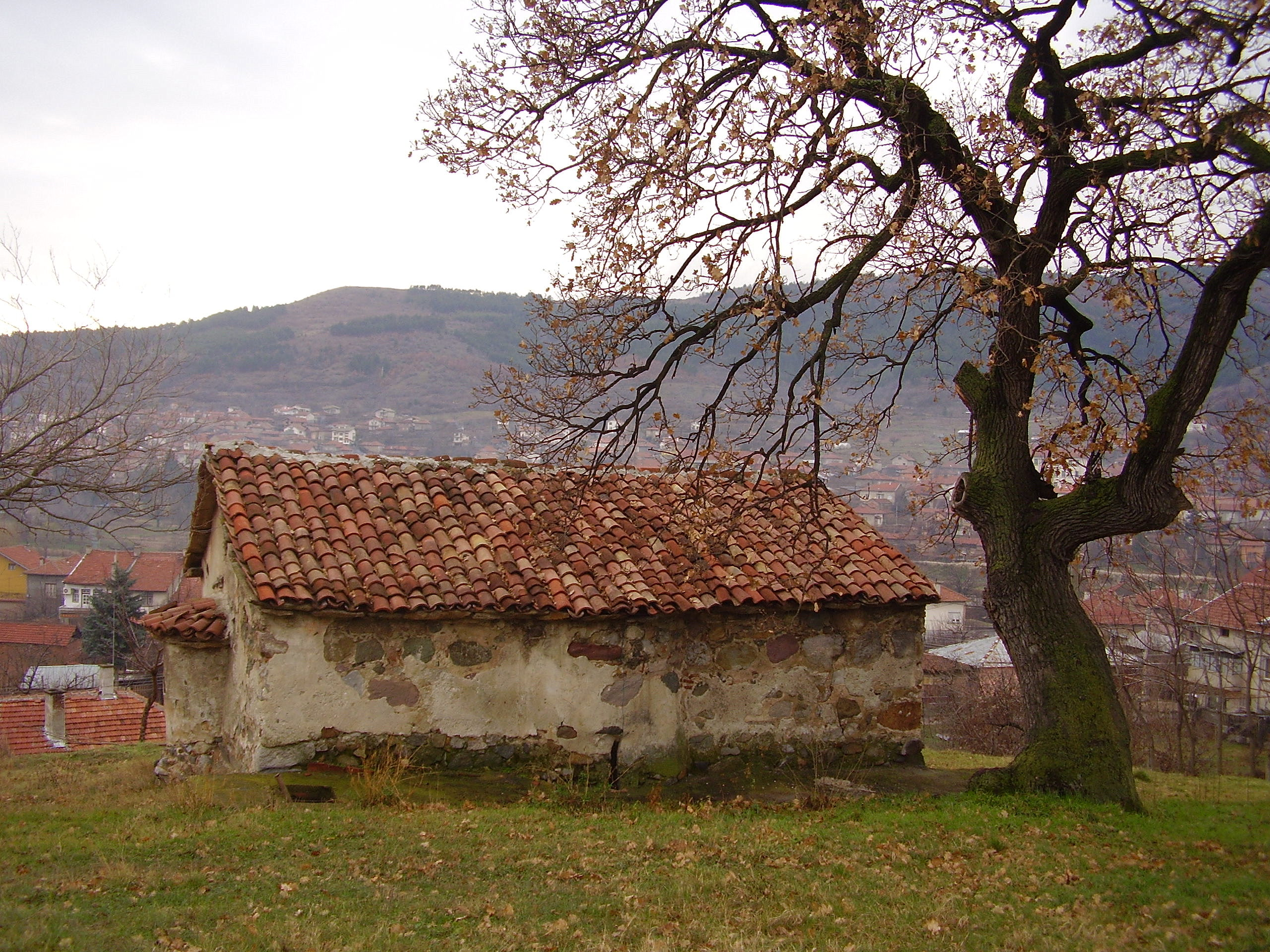

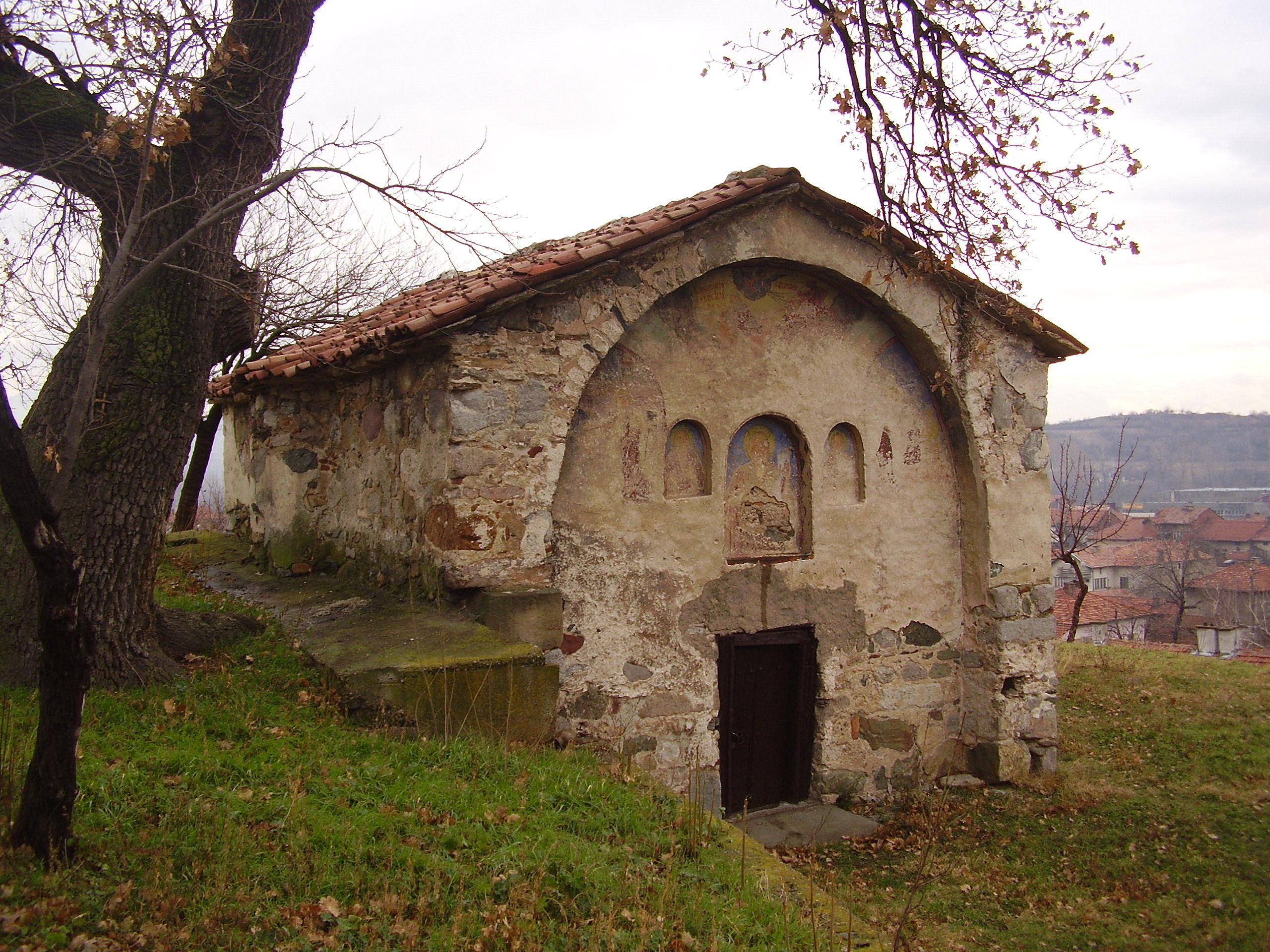

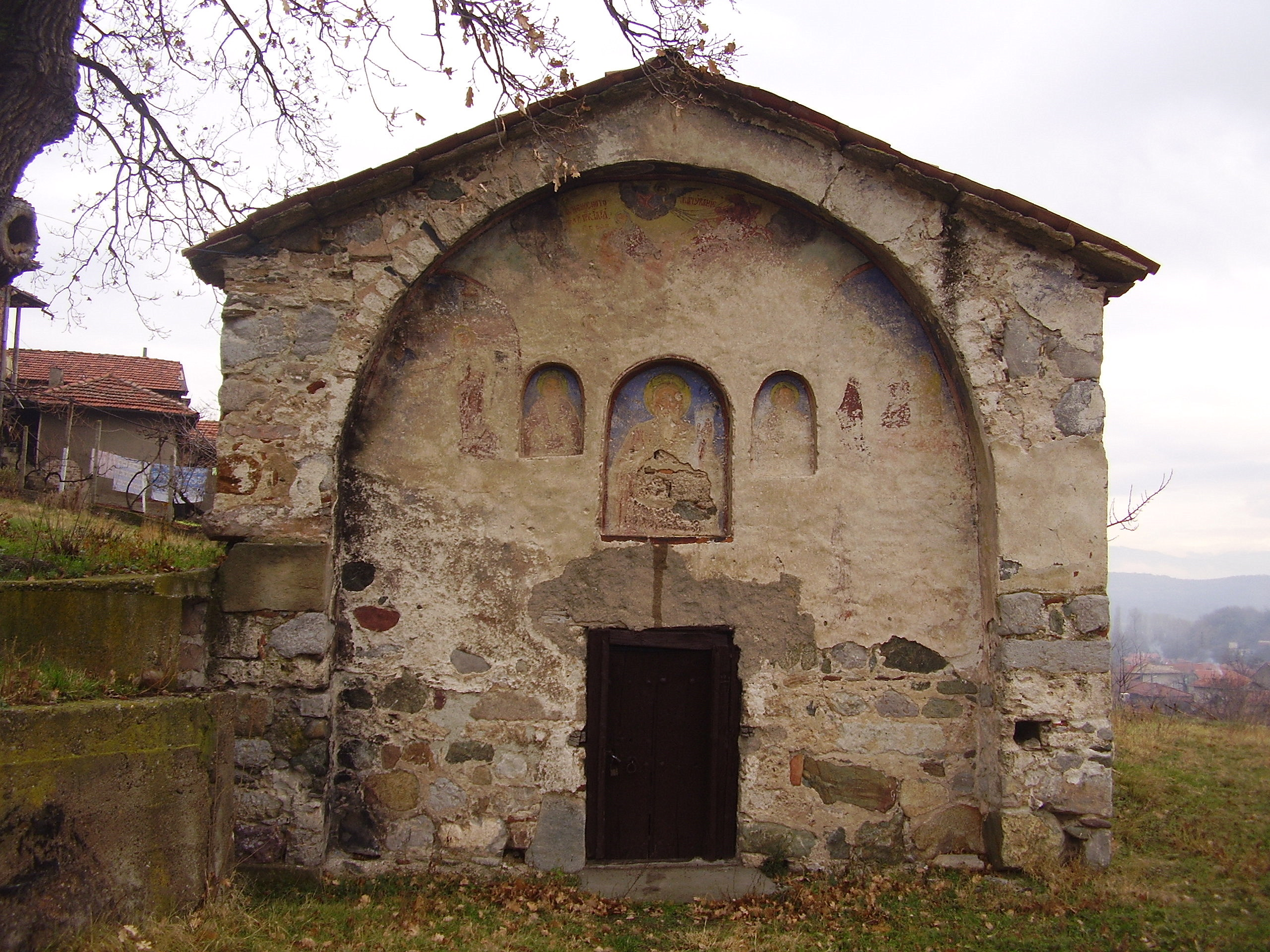
