= Church of St Demetrius, Boboshevo =

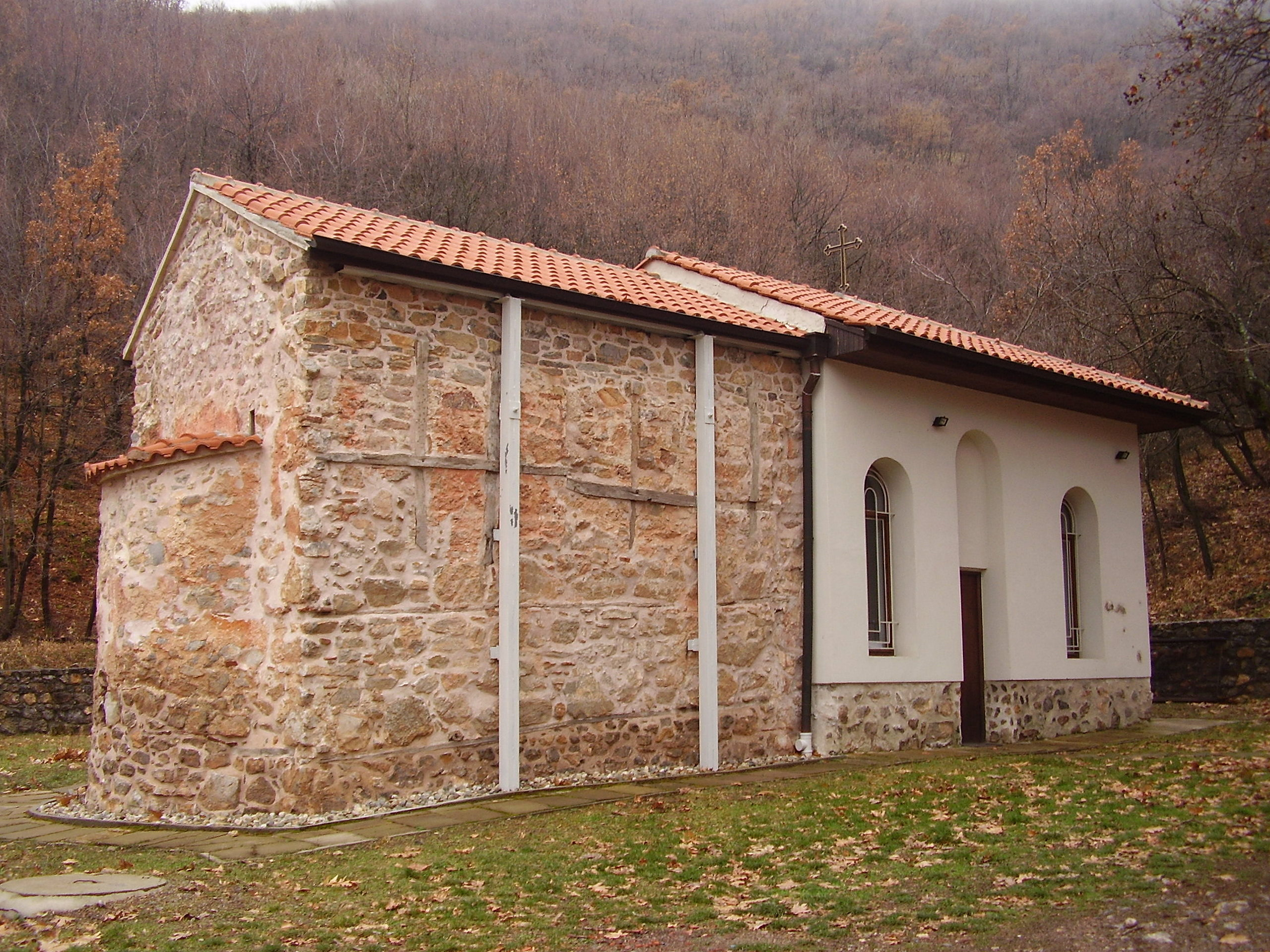
The monastery church of St Dimitar.

The Church of St Demetrius (Bulgarian: Църква Свети Димитър) is a Bulgarian church dating from the Late Middle Ages near the town of Boboshevo, Kyustendil Province.

== Location, history, architectural and artistic features ==
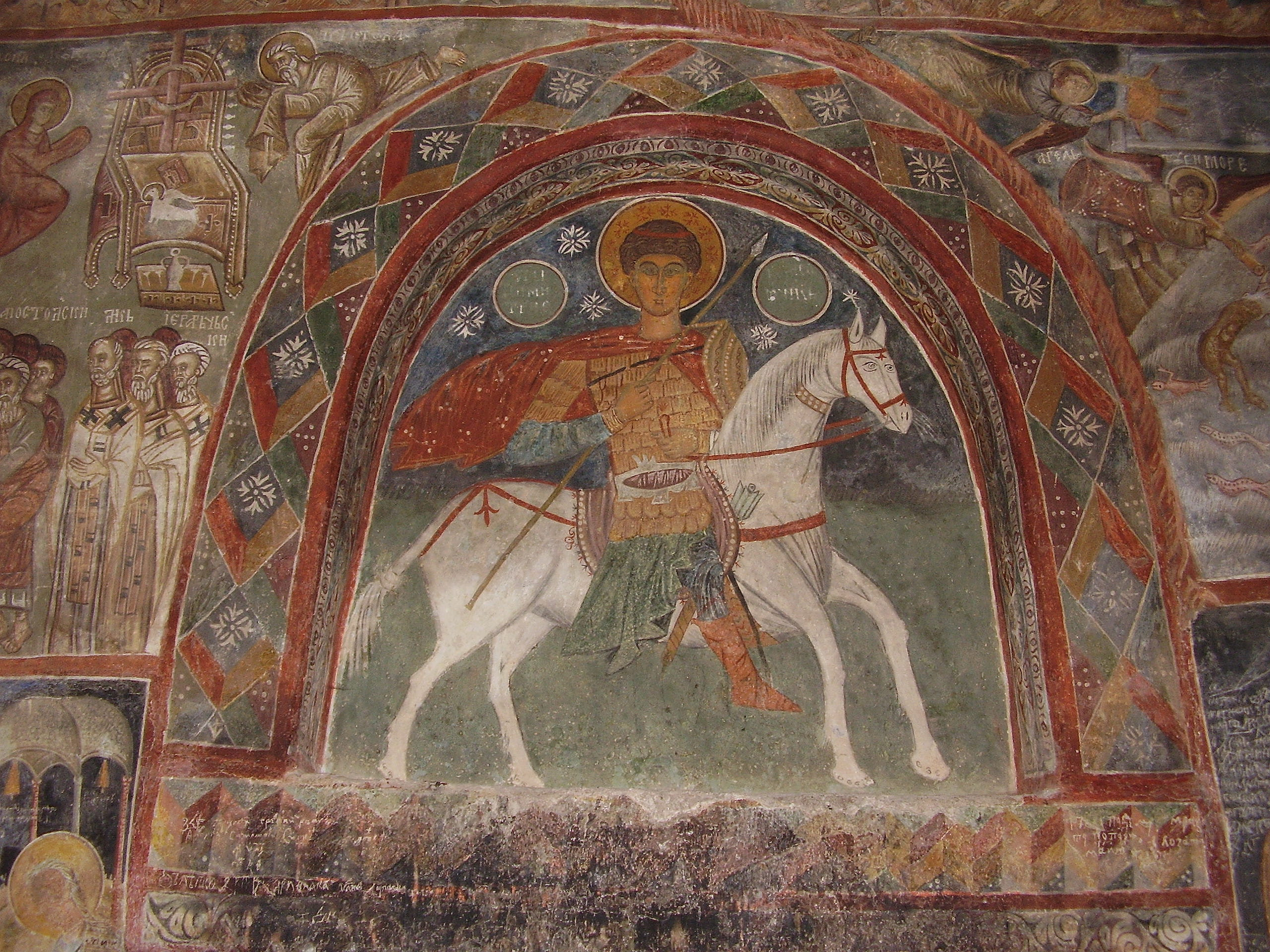
A fresco in the patron niche.

The church is situated at 4 km from the small town of Boboshevo. It is a small one-nave edifice with internal dimension of 4,15 m to 2,66 m and height of 5,50 m. It has a semi-round apse which is 1,38 m wide and 0,70 m deep. On the eastern side to the left of the apse there is a semi-round niche (0,45 x 0,52 x 0,37 m) and on the northern side - a rectangular one (0,20 x 0,20 x 0,25 m). The entrance is to the west and is 1,85 m high and 1,25 m wide. The vault is semi-cylindrical. A narthex was added in 1864 with entrance to the north and five arched windows. The floor of the naos is covered with stone plates.

The whole interior of the church with exception of the narthex is covered with frescoes which is traditional for that type of church. Several artistic traditions have been applied; the figures are dynamic, the characters are emotional and the faces - vivid. The shades are dark, saturated and harmonized. On the vault there are three medallions - one the central one is painted Christ with four angels. On its sides in the two smaller medallions are the images of the prophets - Moses, Aaron, Ezekiel and others. Under them are depicted two layers of scenes: upper layer which includes the big holidays - the Birth, Baptism, Crucifixion and others; and a lower layer with the Passion of Christ. On the northern and southern walls of the church under the Passion there is another frieze of medallions depicting the warrior saints, the three men in the Babylon furnace and others. In the bottom parts of the walls are depicted full-length portraits of saints. On the western wall is depicted the Assumption of Mary and under that scene on the two sides of the door are the images of the sainted rulers Constantine and Helen and Archangel Michael.

The church was built after 1481 and the frescoes were made after 1488 as seen by the inscription on the door of the naos.

The icons in the iconostasis of the church (dated from 1729) are kept in the crypt of the Alexander Nevsky Cathedral in Sofia, and part of the surviving manuscripts of the monastery are kept in Ecclesiastical Museum of History in the capital.

The church was declared an architectural-artistic monument of culture with national importance (DV, is.38/1972).

The church was part of the medieval monastery of St Demetrius. The monastery was established in the 10th century and its initial position was above the village of Skrino. The famous Bulgarian saint John of Rila became monk in that monastery. The monastery was destroyed after the Bulgarian-Ottoman Wars and the fall of the Second Empire. It was rebuilt during the reign of the Ottoman sultan Bayazid II (1481-1512) but not in its original position but to the south-east near Boboshevo. Throughout the following centuries the monastery was an important literary centre for the Bulgarian people. After the Liberation the monastery declined and became uninhabited, its control was first taken by the Municipality of Boboshevo and later by the local priests. Around 1930 the monastery included dwellings, kitchen, bakery, granary and other buildings. At that time the monastery owned 694 decares of land in the eastern slopes of the Ruen mountain which included forests, lawns, fields, orchards and vineyards. Only the church has been preserved today and has undergone a comprehensive restoration.

The church was named after Saint Demetrius of Thessaloniki - one of the most important Eastern Orthodox saints born in the 3rd century in the city of Solun.

== Literature ==
- Grabar, Andre - La peinture religieuse en Bulgarie (Религиозната живопис в България), изд.: Libraire orientaliste Paul Geuthner, Paris, 1928, 450 с., стр.306-332.
- Маринов, Димитър. - Руенски или Бобошевски манастир св.Димитър - "Народен страж", 1928 г., бр.17
- Кепов, Иван - Миналото и сегашно на Бобошево. 1935, 288 с., с.170 и сл.;
- Марди, В. - Бабикова - Научно мотивирано предложение за обявяване на църквата "Св.Димитър" за паметник на културата. София, 1969 г., 20 с. Архив НИПК;
- Дремсизова-Нелчинова, Цв. и Слокоска, Л. - Археологически паметници от Кюстендилски окръг, София, 1978 г., с.13;
- Енциклопедичен речник КЮСТЕНДИЛ А-Я, София, 1988 г., изд.БАН, с.588;
- Гергова, Ив. - Ранният български иконостас 16-18 в., София, 1993, с.24;
- Станева, Хр. - Реставрация на църквата "Св.Димитър" в Бобошево, В: Проблеми на изкуството. 2005, кн.3, с.37-46;
- Ангелов, Светозар - Бобошевският манастир "Св.Димитър", В : Църкви и манастири от Югозападна България през XV- XVІІ в., София, ЦСВП "Проф.Иван Дуйчев" към СУ"Св.Климент Охридски", 2007 г., с.31-33;
- Заедно по свещените места на планината Осогово. Пътеводител, София, 2008 г., изд.РИМ - Кюстендил, печат.Дийор Принт ООД, с.102-104;

== Gallery ==
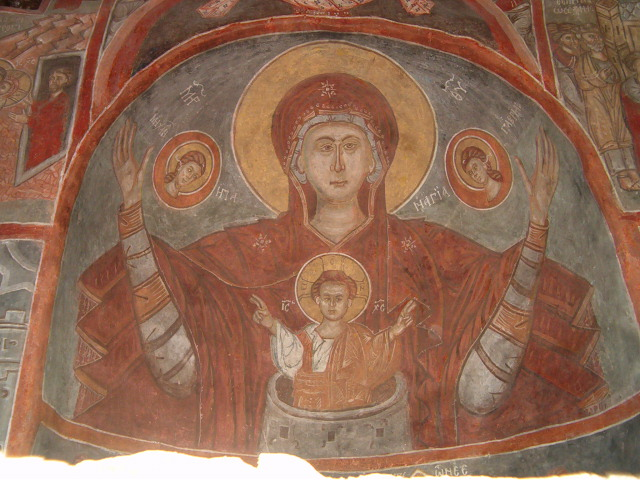
Virgin Mary - fresco

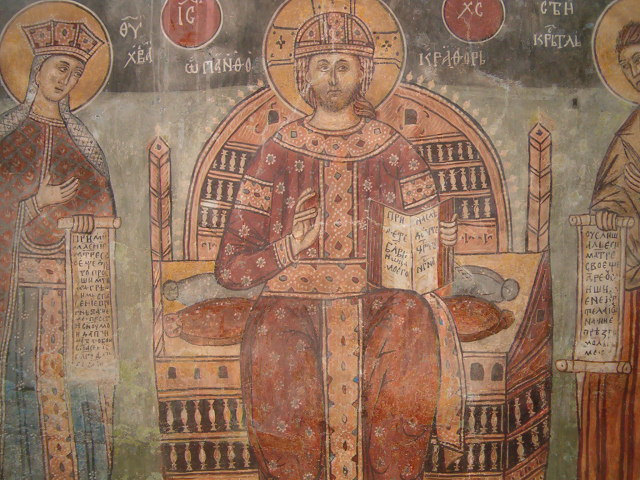
Christ Pantocrator - fresco

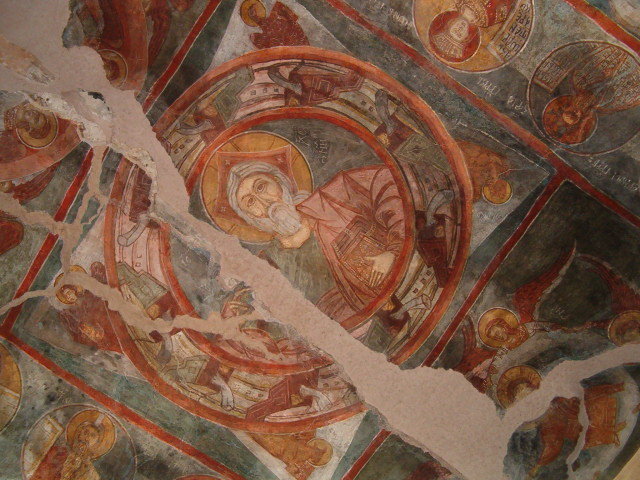
Christ - fresco

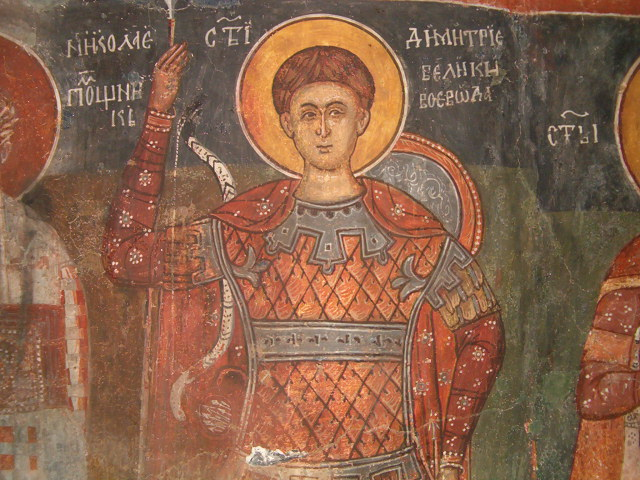
Saint Demetrius - fresco
