= Church of St Athanasius, Boboshevo =

Church in Kyustendil, Bulgaria

Coordinates: 42°9′12″N 22°59′50″E

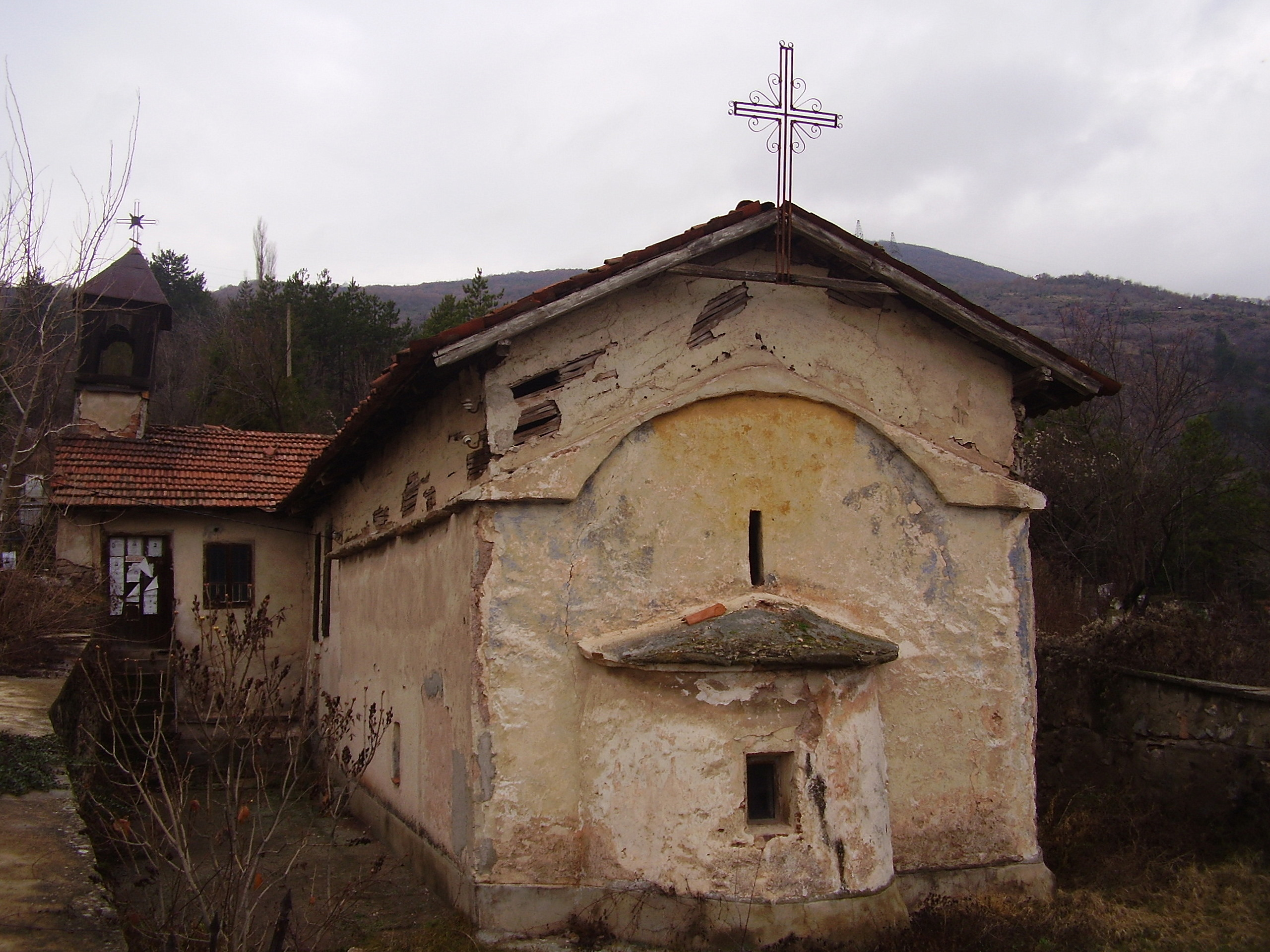
The Church of St Athanasius in Boboshevo

The Church of St Athanasius (Bulgarian: Църква Свети Атанасий) is a late Medieval Bulgarian church in the town of Boboshevo, Kyustendil Province.

== Location, history, architectural and artistic values ==
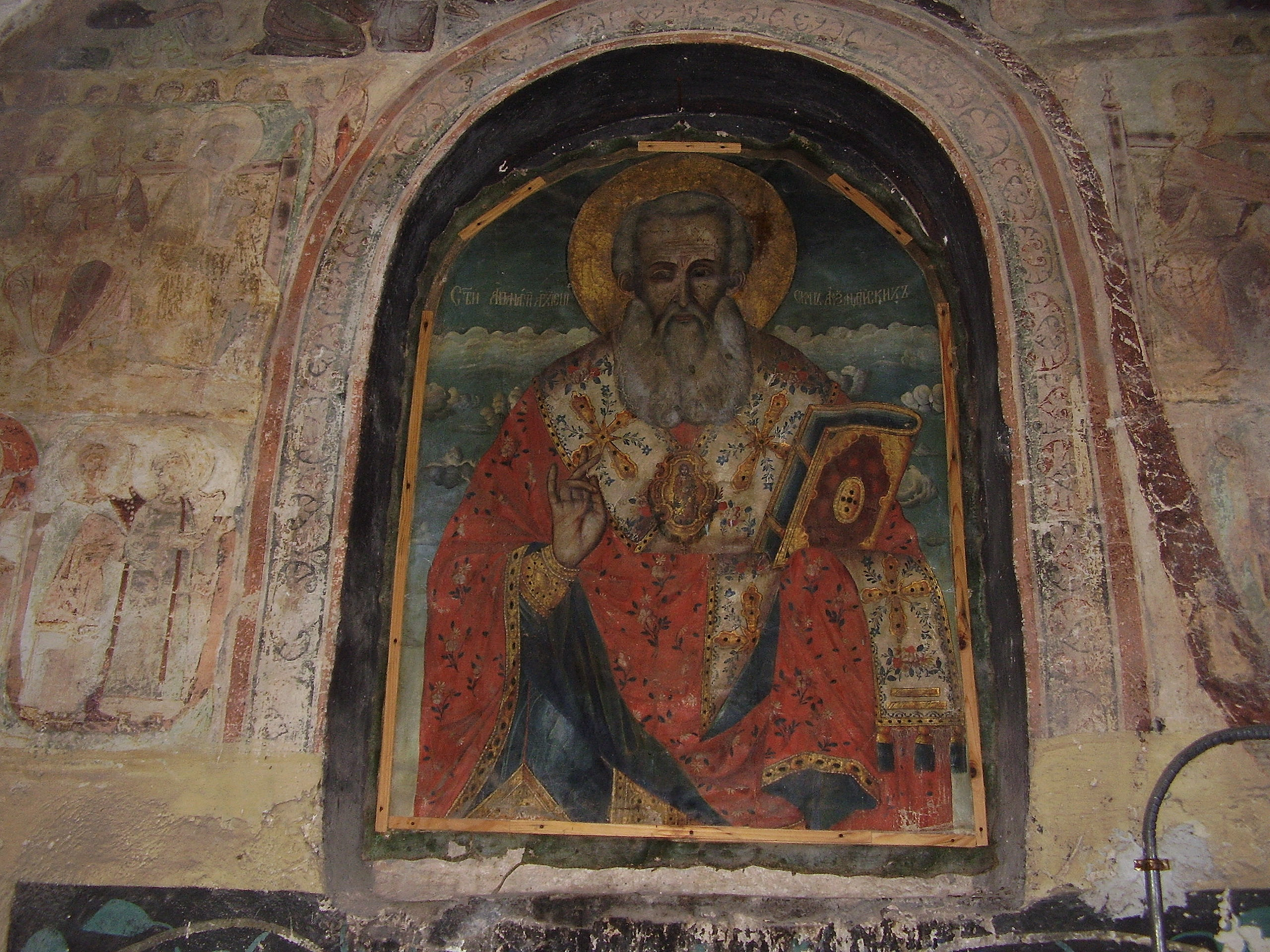
An icon of Saint Athanasius in the patron niche in the western facade of the church

The church is situated on a large platform in the cemetery in the small town of Boboshevo. It is a small one nave church with a semi-round apse. It is 8 m long and 5 m wide. There are two niches on the left and the right walls and another small semi-round niche on the northern niche. The church used to have a vault which was replaced with eaves during the reconstruction. A covered narthex was added in the 18th century and in 1926–1927 a new narthex with refectory was constructed. The walls of the church are 0.70 m thick and are made of stone. The church was fully painted from the inside and the western facade was painted from the outside as well according to the canon. According to the hardly readable ktitor inscriptions on the southern wall the church was constructed in 1590 or 1600. Up to 29 October 1862 it used to be the main church of the town. After the construction of the larger Church of St Bogoroditsa, St Athanasius was converted into a cemetery church.

The church is an architectural monument of culture of local significance (DV is.77/1972) and an architectural-artistic monument of national importance (DV is.38/1972).

The church was named after Athanasius of Alexandria also known as Saint Athanasius I the Great Patriarch of Alexandria. The church honours the saint on 18 January and 2 May.

== Literature ==
- Кепов, Иван - Миналото и сегашно на Бобошево. С., 1935, с. 191;
- Василиев, Асен - Проучвания на изобразителните изкуства из някои селища по долината на Струма. - Известия на Института за изобразителни изкуства, VII, 1964 г., с.157 и сл.;
- Марди, В. - Бабикова - Научно мотивирано предложение за обявяване на църквата "Св.Атанас" в с.Бобошево, Кюстендилско за паметник на културата. С., 1969, 23 с.;
- Дремсизова-Нелчинова, Цв., Л. Слокоска. Археологически паметници от Кюстендилски окръг. С., 1978, с. 13;
- Енциклопедичен речник Кюстендил А-Я. С., 1988, с. 587.
- Матуски, В. Иконографската програма на храма „Св. Атанасий Александрйски" в гр. Бобошево и някои особености в иконографията му. - В: Любен Прашков - реставратор и изкуствовед. Материали от научна конференция посветена на 70 год. на проф. Л. Прашков, 14-15 дек. 2001, ВТУ. С. 2006, с. 291-300;
- Матуски, В. За три храма по долината на река Струма. - В: Проф. д.и.н. Станчо Ваклинов и средновековната българска култура, Велико Търново, 2005, с. 452-458;
- Матуски, В. Стенописни надписи от бобошевския храм „Св. Атанасий Александрийски" в контекста на неговата иконография. — В: Културните текстове на миналото, носители, символи и идеи. Т. IV. С., 2005, с. 60-63;
- Ангелов, Светозар - Църквата "Св.Атанасий" в Бобошево - проучвания и проблеми. - Известия на Историческия музей - Кюстендил, XIV, 2007, с. 123-140;
- Ангелов, Светозар - Църквата "Св.Атанасий" в Бобошево, В : Църкви и манастири от Югозападна България през XV- XVII в., София, ЦСВП "Проф.Иван Дуйчев" към СУ"Св.Климент Охридски", 2007 г., с.38-40;
- Заедно по свещените места на планината Осогово. Пътеводител. С., 2008, с. 108.

== Gallery ==
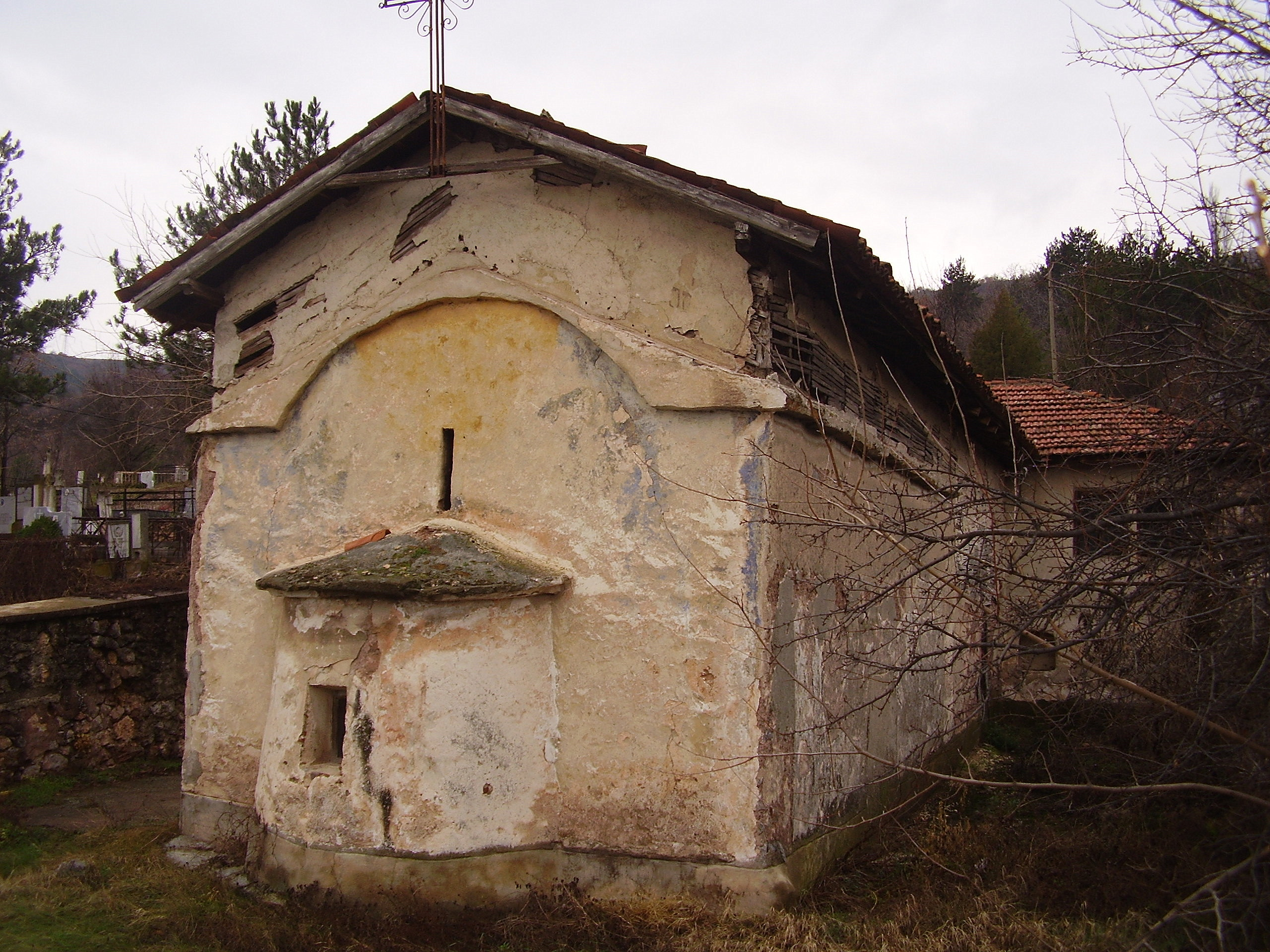

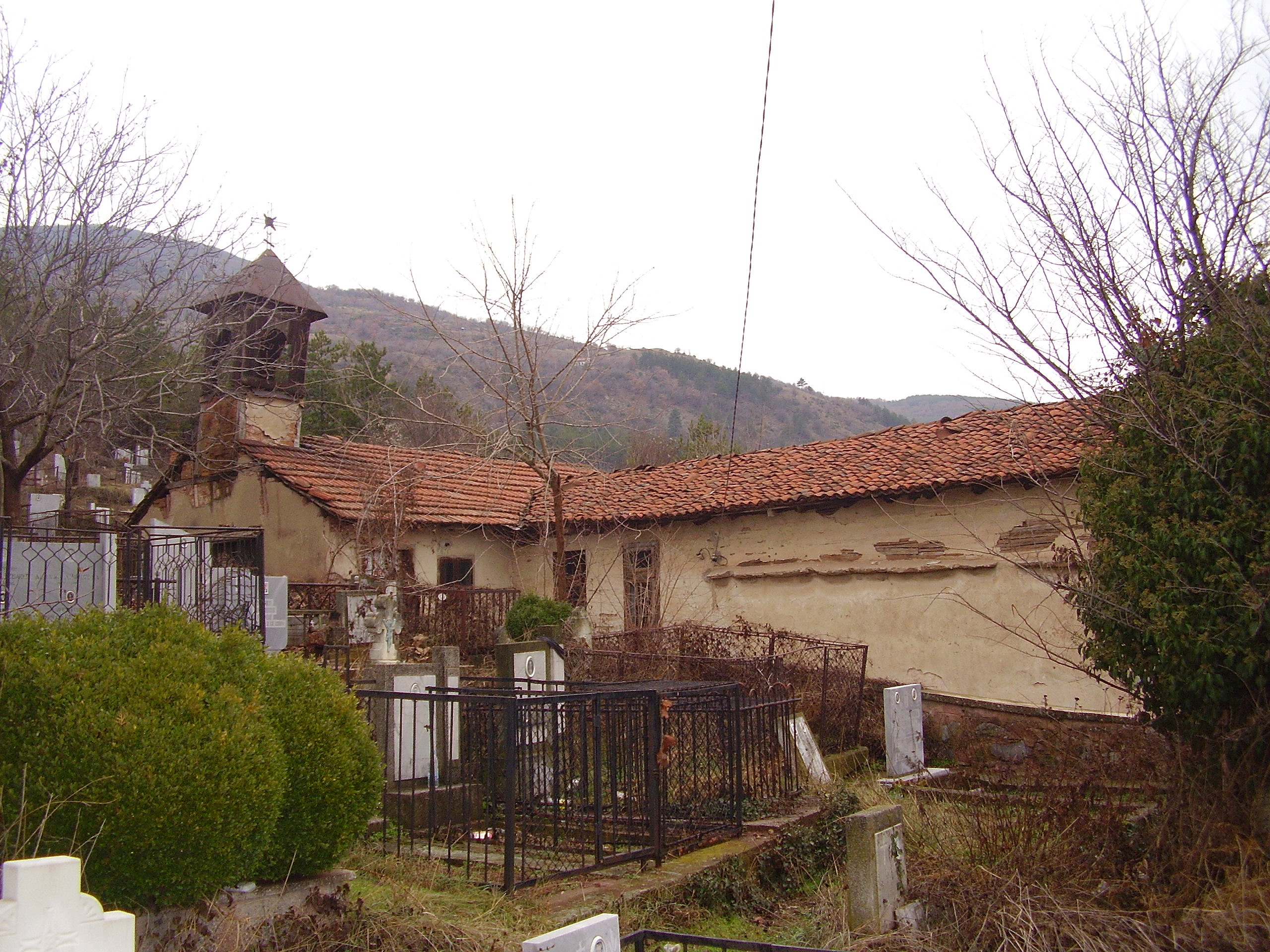

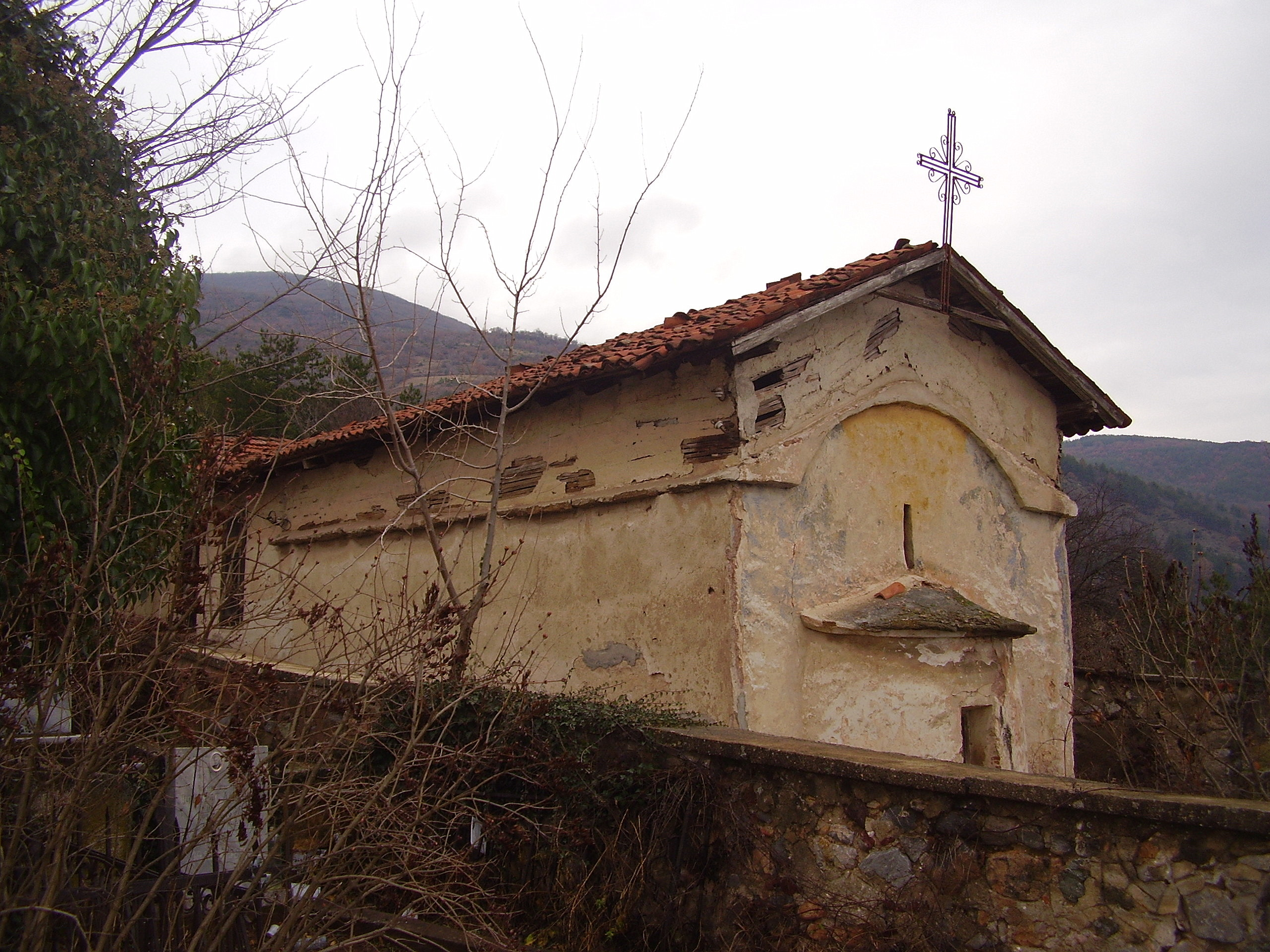

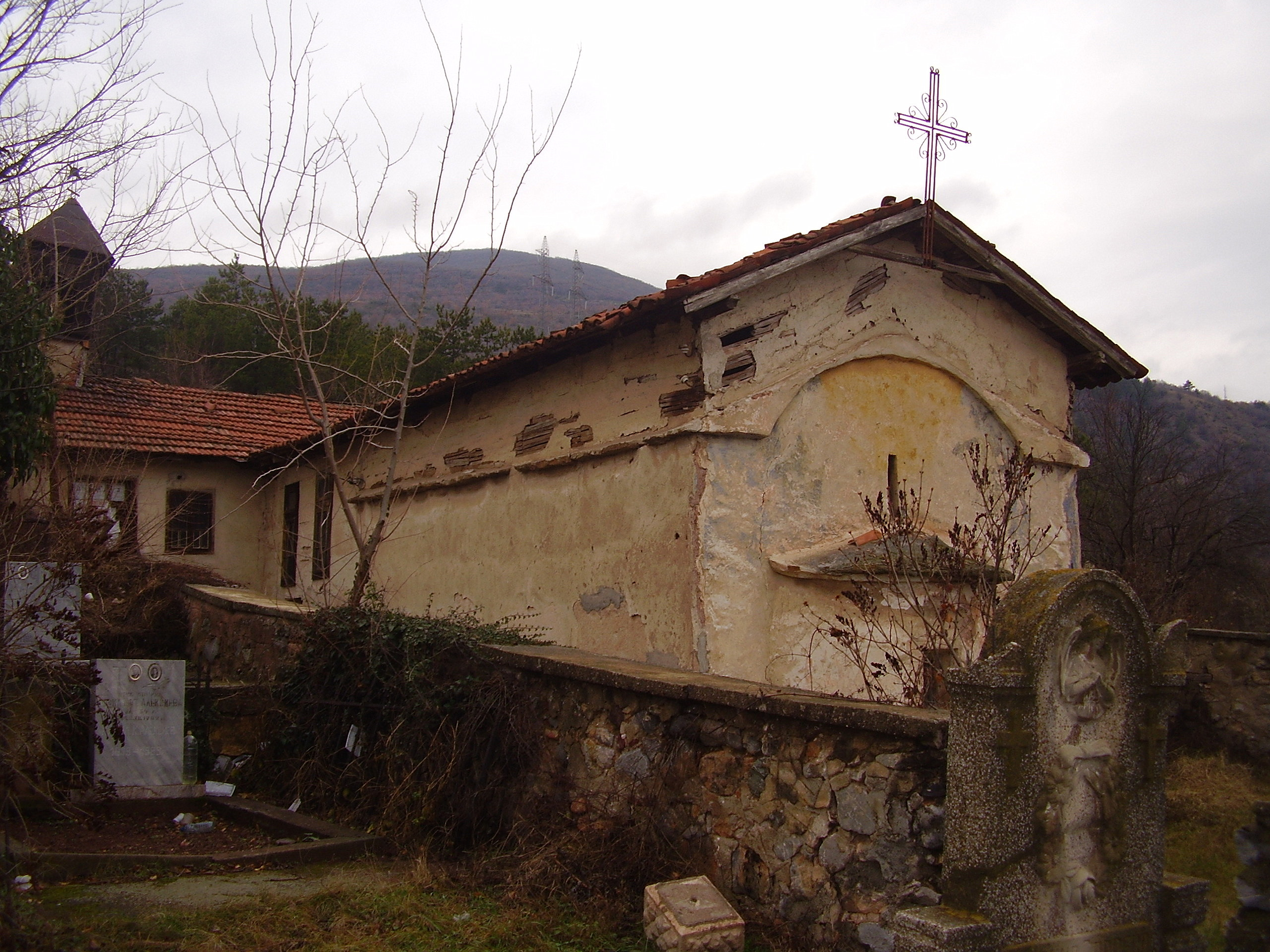
