= Church of Saint Demetrius in Mitrovica, Kosovo =

Serbian Orthodox church in Mitrovica, Kosovo

Church of St. Demetrius
- Црква Светог Димитрија; Kisha e Shën Dhimitrit
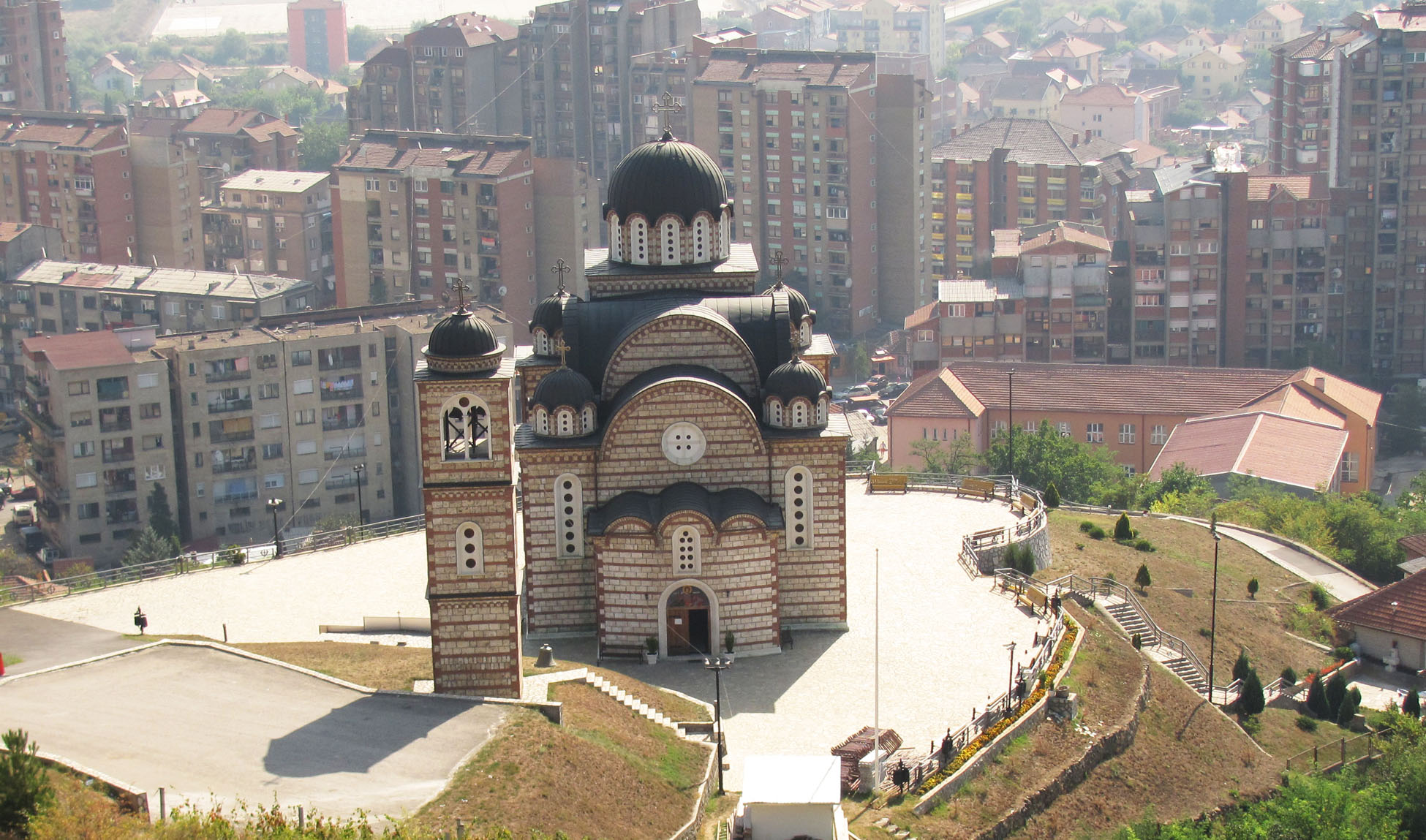
- Church of St. Demetrius
- 42°53′44″N 20°51′45″E
- Location: Mitrovica
- Country: Kosovo
- Denomination: Serbian Orthodox

History
- Status: Church
- Dedication: Demetrius of Thessaloniki

Architecture
- Functional status: Active
- Completed: 2005

The Church of St. Demetrius (Serbian Cyrillic: Црква Светог Димитрија, romanized: Crkva Svetog Dimitrija; Albanian: Kisha e Shën Dhimitrit) is the church of the Serbian Orthodox Church, owned by the Rasko-Prizren diocese, in the city of Mitrovica, Kosovo.

After NATO bombing of Yugoslavia, Mitrovica was divided into northern and southern parts. Due to the separation, the Church of St. Sava, located in the southern, Albanian part of the city, became inaccessible to the Serbs who migrated to the northern part of the city. There was a need to build a new temple, the construction of which began in November 2001. The place for the construction of a new temple is carefully selected and dominant; the temple is visible from any part of the city. The construction of the church was completed in November 2005, the consecration ceremony was held on St. Demetrius Day in the same year.

== Church architecture ==
The church, dedicated to Demetrius of Thessaloniki, is a one-nave seven-domed structure with one main central dome and four smaller domes between the shoulders of the inscribed cross, with two more smaller domes above the proskomidia and deaconesses and a separate tower bell tower in the west. The apse of the altar space is semicircular both outside and inside. The nave is reduced by three semicircular arches, the narthex by two smaller domes with an octagonal vestibule above the chapels, and in the central part by a semi-arched vault, and the nave by a vaulted arch resting on the walls of the facade and two round arches.

The Church of St. Demetrius has three doors. The main portal is on the west side. Two other side portals were installed on the north and south sides of the church. Along with the Banjska Monastery, the church is the religious center of North Kosovo.
