= Saint Demetrius Church, Focșani =

Heritage site in Vrancea County, Romania

Coordinates: 45°41′52″N 27°11′07″E

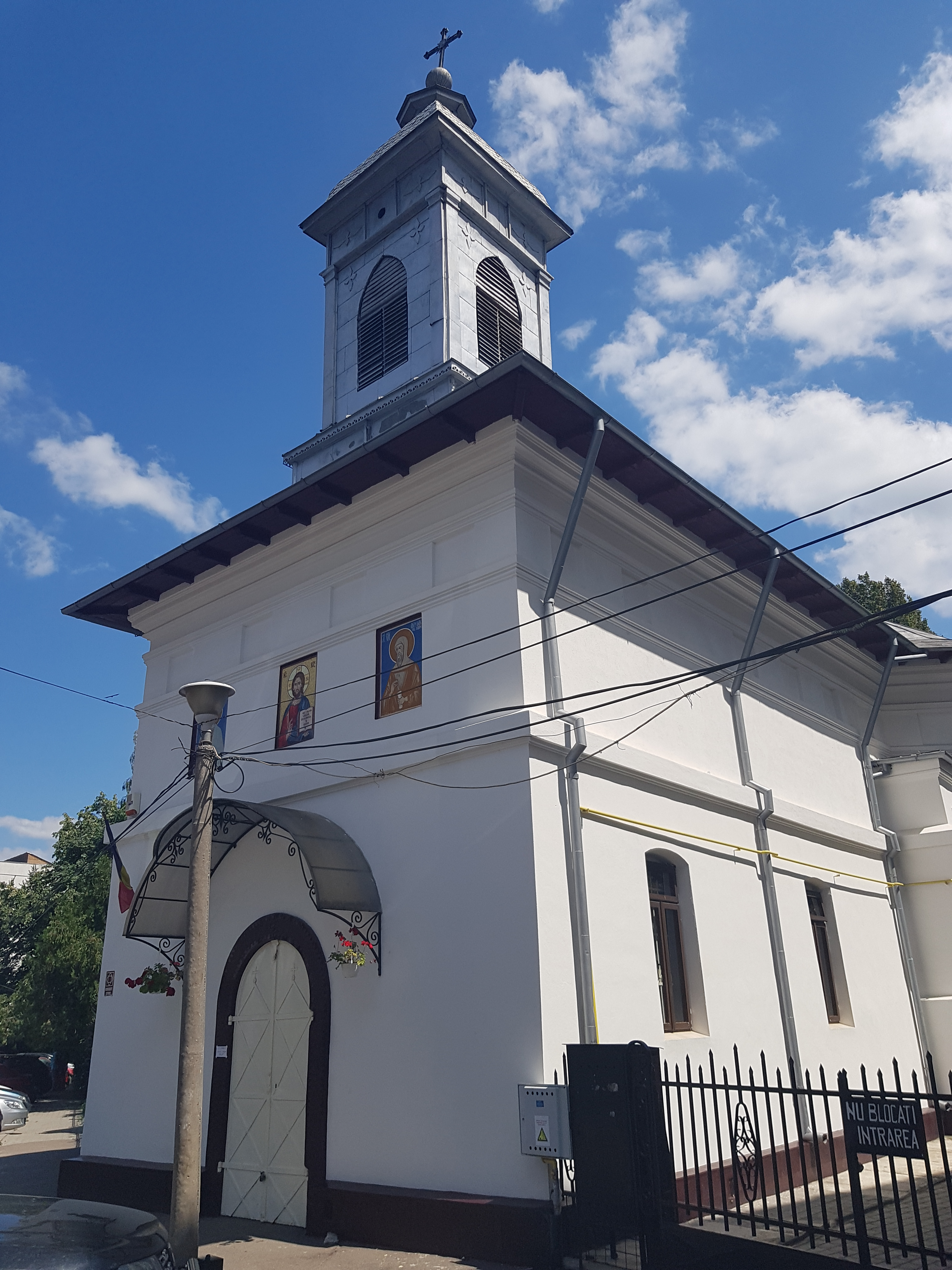
Saint Demetrius Church

Saint Demetrius Church (Romanian: Biserica Sfântul Dumitru) is a Romanian Orthodox church located at 4 Eroilor Street in Focșani, Romania. It is dedicated to Saint Demetrius of Thessaloniki, as well as to Anthony the Great.

The church was built on a plot of land donated by two brothers in 1692. First built in wood in 1696, it was rebuilt as a masonry structure in trefoil shape in 1709. The building is characteristic of the nascent Phanariot era, during which small-scale ktetors would donate for their spiritual and social benefit. A Captain Vicol financed construction.

When the church was placed under the supervision of the Agapia Monastery, the furious inhabitants of Focșani pillaged it. Tensions abated after the monastery leadership made several attempts to restore calm. Subsequently, in 1820, Veniamin Costache, the Metropolitan of Moldavia, took on the role of mediator between town and monastery.

By 1921, the church had degraded into a ruinous state, such that the city hall was considering demolition. Although saved from that fate following an appeal by parishioners, it was not until 1936 that a partial renovation took place, with further work in 1942 and 1968–1969. It came to be known as the Power Plant Church (Sfântul Dumitru - Uzină) due to the proximity of an electric station, demolished in 1978. The dedication to Saint Anthony was added in 1988, at the end of a six-year restoration.

The cross-shaped church is divided into a porch, narthex, nave and altar. The building material is masonry and limestone mortar. The porch features a closed balcony with carved wood. The neoclassical facades are horizontally separated by a sharply highlighted row of plaster. The upper register is decorated with square niches. The spire sits on the porch.

The church and is listed as a historic monument by Romania's Ministry of Culture and Religious Affairs.
