= St. Demetrius' Church, Poliçan =

Cultural monument in Albania

St. Demetrius' Church
- Kisha e Shën Mitrit (Albanian)
- Location: Poliçan

Cultural Monument of Albania

St. Demetrius' Church (Albanian: Kisha e Shën Mitrit) is a church in Poliçan, Berat County, Albania. It became a Cultural Monument of Albania in 1977.
