= St. Athanasius' Monastery Church, Erind =

16th-century monastery in Albania

St. Athanasius Monastery (Albanian: Kisha e Shën Thanasit) in Erind, a village in the Lunxhër municipality, Gjirokastër County, Albania, is a 16th-century monastery. It is not part of the List of Religious Cultural Monuments of Albania.

== History ==
The monastery was built in the 16th century, and in 1911 had an annual revenue of 40 Ottoman liras. Frederik Stamati, director of the Laboratory of Conservation in the Institute of Popular Culture, said in 2016 that the church is now in a miserable condition and public funds are needed for its restoration before the building collapses.
