= St. Demetrius' Church, Drobonik =

Cultural monument in Albania

Coordinates: 40.707°N 19.946°E

St. Demetrius' Church
- Kisha e Shën Mitrit (Albanian)
- Interactive map of St. Demetrius' Church
- Location: Drobonik

Cultural Monument of Albania

St. Demetrius' Church (Albanian: Kisha e Shën Mitrit) is a church in Drobonik, Berat County, Albania. It became a Cultural Monument of Albania in 1970.
