= Milenko Velev =

Bulgarian architect

Milenko Stefanov Velev (Bulgarian: Миленко Стефанов Велев), known as Master Milenko and Milenko Radomirets was a builder and architect from the time of the Bulgarian Renaissance.

== Biography ==
The master was born in the end of the 18th century in Blateshnitsa, Radomir district in Bulgaria. In 1859 he signed a letter, addressed to the Zograf Monastery as Milenko Blateshnitski. He is a renowned builder in Mount Athos and in Southwest Bulgaria as well.

He builds mainly churches and residential buildings, but he has been also charged with state building projects. One of those was the bridge on Struma river near the city of Boboshevo. Among his works are the churches “St. Nikolas” in Balanovo (1844), “St. Nikolas” in Dupnitsa (1844), “St. Petka” in Tran (1853), “St. Mary” in Boboshevo (1853), “St. Elijah” in Granitsa (1857). In the last village he has built the famous “Granitski House” - a residential fortified tower.

The most notorious of his works is the south wing of the Rila Monastery (1847–1848). It is a beautiful building with two-storey monastic cells, solved in an interesting manner. There are situated the refectory, the abbotry, the hospital, the book depository (skevofilakija) and the library.

The churches, constructed by Master Milenko were built with a mixed stone and bricks work. They own rich facade plastic decoration, containing blind arcades and three-coloured arch-like pediments. All of them are in perfect geometrical proportions and details. They are among the most beautiful buildings in the Bulgarian Renaissance church architecture.

There is no information of master Milenko's fate after 1859.
