= Boboshevo =

Town in Kyustendil, Bulgaria

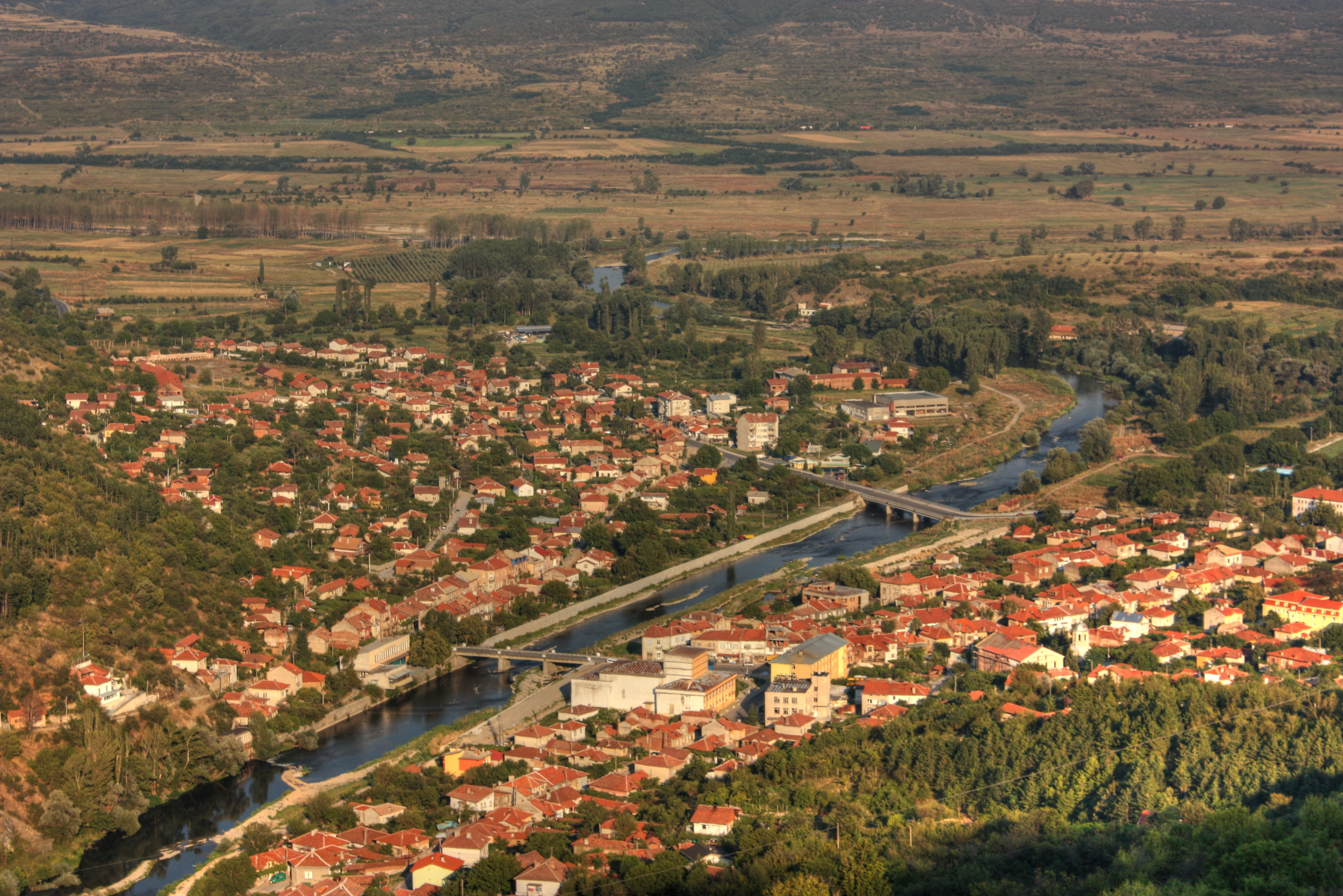
- Bird's eye overview of Boboshevo

- Location of Boboshevo
- Coordinates: 42°9′N 23°1′E
- Country: Bulgaria
- Provinces (Oblast): Kyustendil

Government
  - Mayor: Krum Marinov
- Elevation: 386 m (1,266 ft)

Population (15.12.2004)
  - Total: 1,495
- Time zone: UTC+2 (EET)
  - Summer (DST): UTC+3 (EEST)
- Postal Code: 2660
- Area code: 07046

Boboshevo (Bulgarian: Бобошево [ˈbɔboʃɛvo]) is a town in Western Bulgaria. It is located in Kyustendil Province and is close to the towns of Kocherinovo and Rila.

The town of Boboshevo is situated about 75 km (47 mi) to the south of Sofia and 65 km (40 mi) from Bulgaria's prime skiing destination, Bansko. It is approximately 4 km away from Boboshevo is the main road that connects Sofia with the Greek border.

Boboshevo lies in the lowest part of the southwestern ridge of the Rila Mountains, in the fertile valley of the Struma River (where it meets with the German River). Thanks to its favourable location and mild climate, the area of Boboshevo has been populated since antiquity.

The Boboshevo region is known also as the 'Bulgarian Jerusalem' along with the region of Ohrid due to its role of a cultural centre during the 15th to the 17th century. The region is rich in churches and monasteries, most of which date back to that period.

The most famous of these is the St Dimitar Monastery, which lies in the lower eastern part of the Ruen Mountain. It is an extremely precious representative of medieval architecture, possessing the highest value — a monument of national importance — according to the Bulgarian criteria of listing. The church (as it now stands) was constructed during the last quarter of the 15th century. It has one nave, one round apse, and is covered by a semi-spheric vault. The wall paintings cover both the walls and the ceiling entirely, as well as the western façade. They are dated to 1488 and are extremely valuable, which goes beyond national cultural boundaries and provokes the interest of many Balkan researchers, tourists and pilgrims.

St Dimitar is one of the oldest monasteries in Bulgaria having existed since the First Bulgarian Empire, around the 10th century. After being destroyed during the Ottoman invasion in Bulgaria in the late 14th century, it was reconstructed in 1488.

The monastery is not only significant because of its age. It is treasured also because one of Bulgaria's greatest heroes and the country's patron saint, St Ivan Rilski, got his start there. St. Dimitar hosted St Ivan Rilski during his early years of monkhood, before he moved to live as a hermit in a nearby cave and then founded the famous Rila monastery.

In 2002–2003, another monastery was built in the region. It is located in the neighbourhood of the village Skrino and is named after St Ivan Rilski for his being born in the same village. A steep path starts from the monastery and leads up in the mountains to the cave where St Ivan Rilski used to live.

Located nearby in the neighbourhood of the Slatino village, an Eneolithic settlement with valuable objects of the early 5th millennium BC was uncovered during excavations. In addition to more than 500 ceramic objects, qualified as true masterpieces of fine art, there is a unique finding of an oven model with a lunar calendar painted on its bottom. The calendar is the oldest of its kind found anywhere in Europe.

Today, Boboshevo is a quiet little town with houses, a few coffee shops and bars.

== Population ==
Historical population

Year	Pop.	±%
2004	1,407	—
2005	1,404	−0.2%
2006	1,394	−0.7%
2007	1,366	−2.0%

Year	Pop.	±%
2008	1,336	−2.2%
2009	1,310	−1.9%
2010	1,291	−1.5%
2011	1,224	−5.2%

From the year 1962 on: No double counting—residents of multiple communes (e.g. students and military personnel) are counted only once.

== Landmarks ==
- Church of St Theodore
- Church of St Demetrius
- Church of St Elijah
- Church of St Athanasius
- Church of the Holy Mother of God
- Ruen Monastery

== Gallery ==
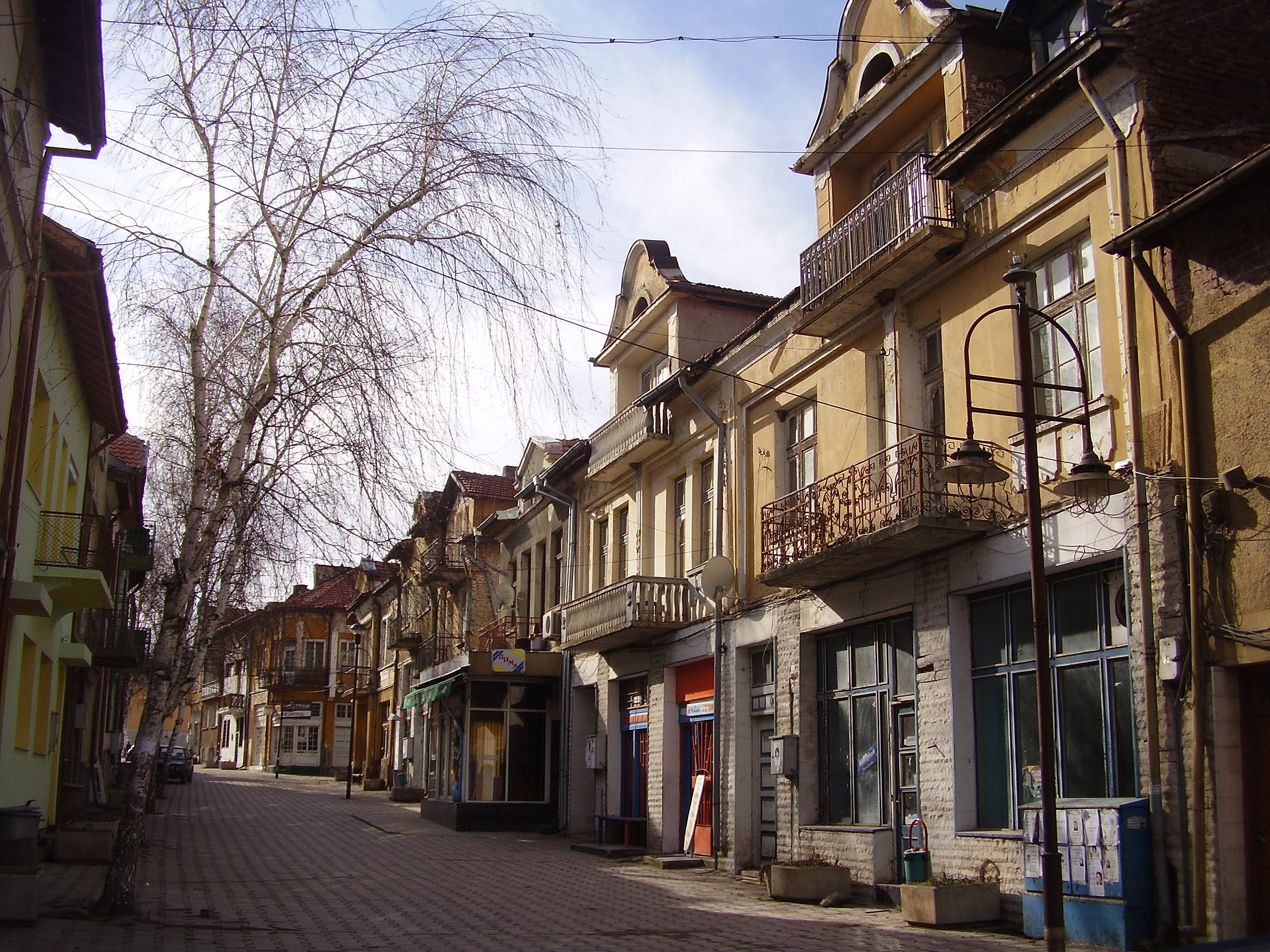
Boboshevo's trade street

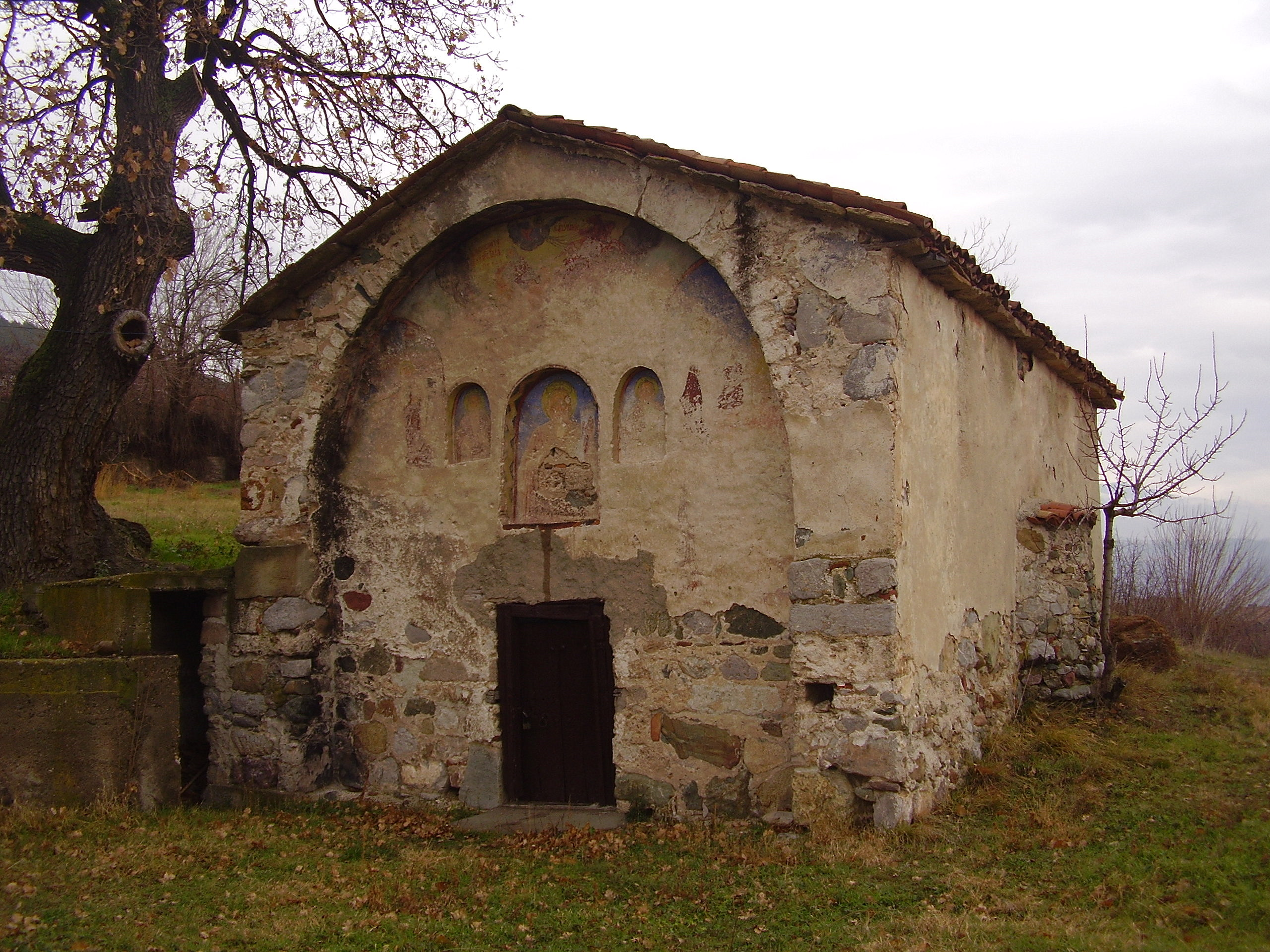
Church of St Elijah

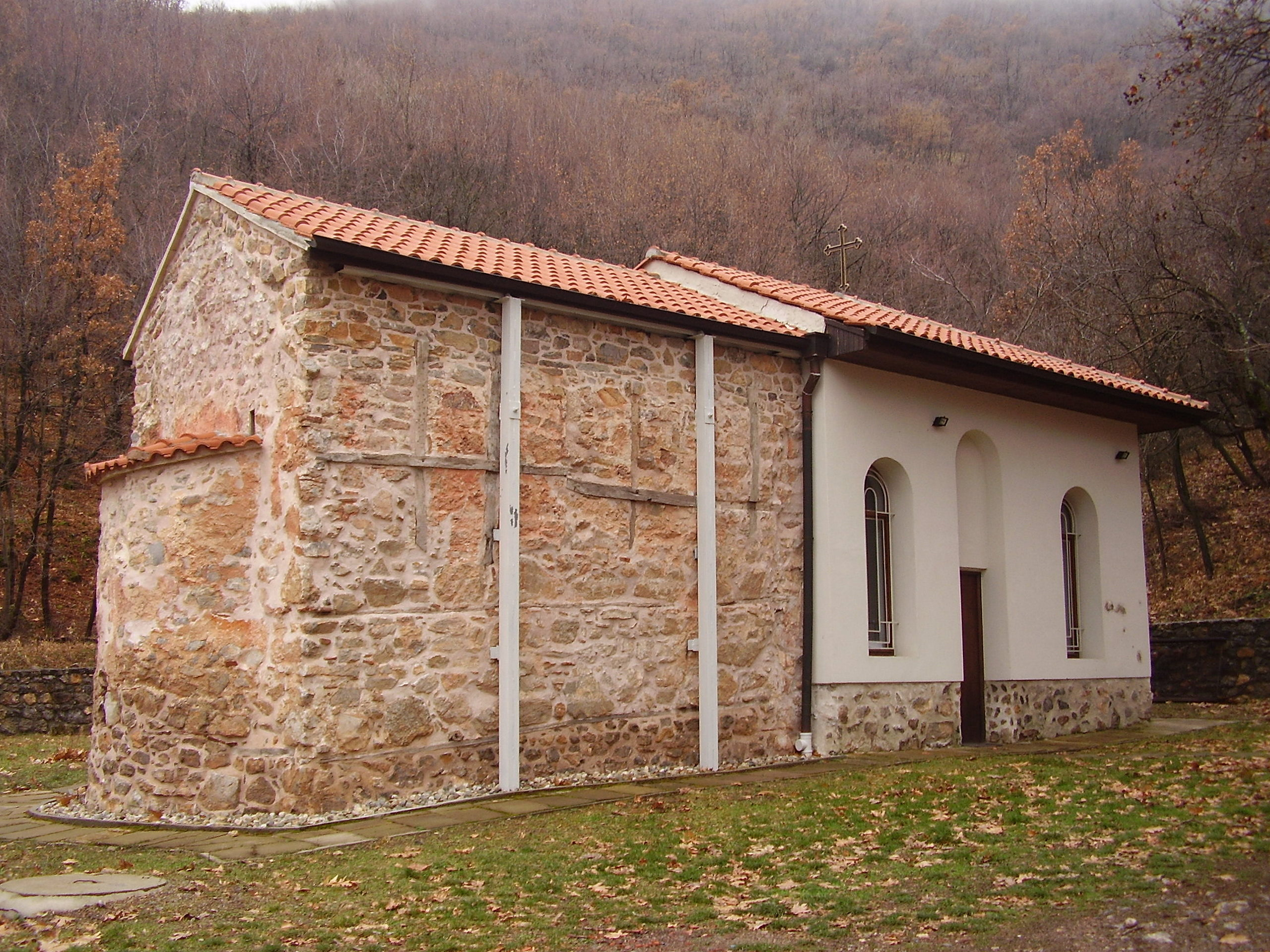
Church of St Demetrius

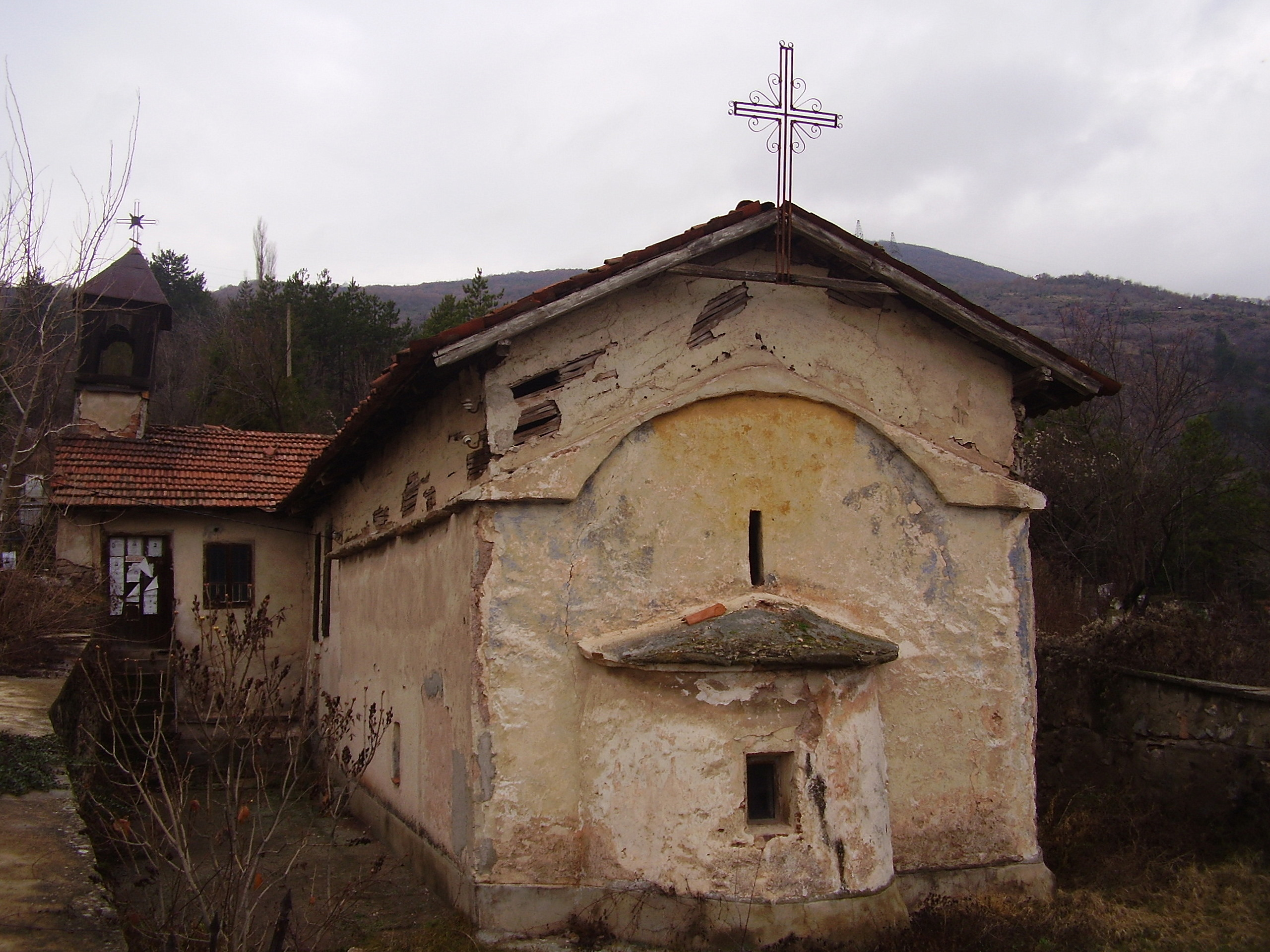
Church of St Athanasius
