= Vukovo =

Vukovo Вуково
- Village
- Location within Bulgaria
- Coordinates: 42°11′42″N 22°58′26″E
- Country: Bulgaria
- Province: Kyustendil Province
- Municipality: Boboshevo

Government
  - Mayor: Milcho Orozov (BSP)

Area
  - Total: 18.441 km^{2} (7.120 sq mi)
- Elevation: 518 m (1,699 ft)

Population (2013)
  - Total: 58
- Time zone: UTC+2 (EET)
  - Summer (DST): UTC+3 (EEST)
- Postal Code: 2661

Vukovo (Bulgarian: Вуково) is a village in the Boboshevo Municipality, Kyustendil Province, western Bulgaria. As of 2013 it has 58 inhabitants.

== Geography ==
The village is located in western Bulgaria to the south-east of the city of Kyustendil. It is situated in a mountainous region near the Struma River. The village is located at 5 km from the municipal center Boboshevo, 25 km from the capital of the province Kyustendil, 61 km from the national capital Sofia and 22 km from the city of Blagoevgrad.

== Population ==
- 2007 – 82
- 2008 – 73
- 2013 – 58

== History ==
There are no records for the establishment of the village but it is considered one of the oldest settlements in the municipality because of the discovered archaeological remains in the surroundings of Vukovo - an antique settlement, necropolis and a fortress from the Late Antiquity.

After the democratic changes in 1989 the population sharply decreased as a result of migrationin, especially since the beginning of the 21st century. The perspectives for the villages are in the fields of agriculture (grapes, orchards), as well as rural, culture and church tourism.

== Historic landmarks ==
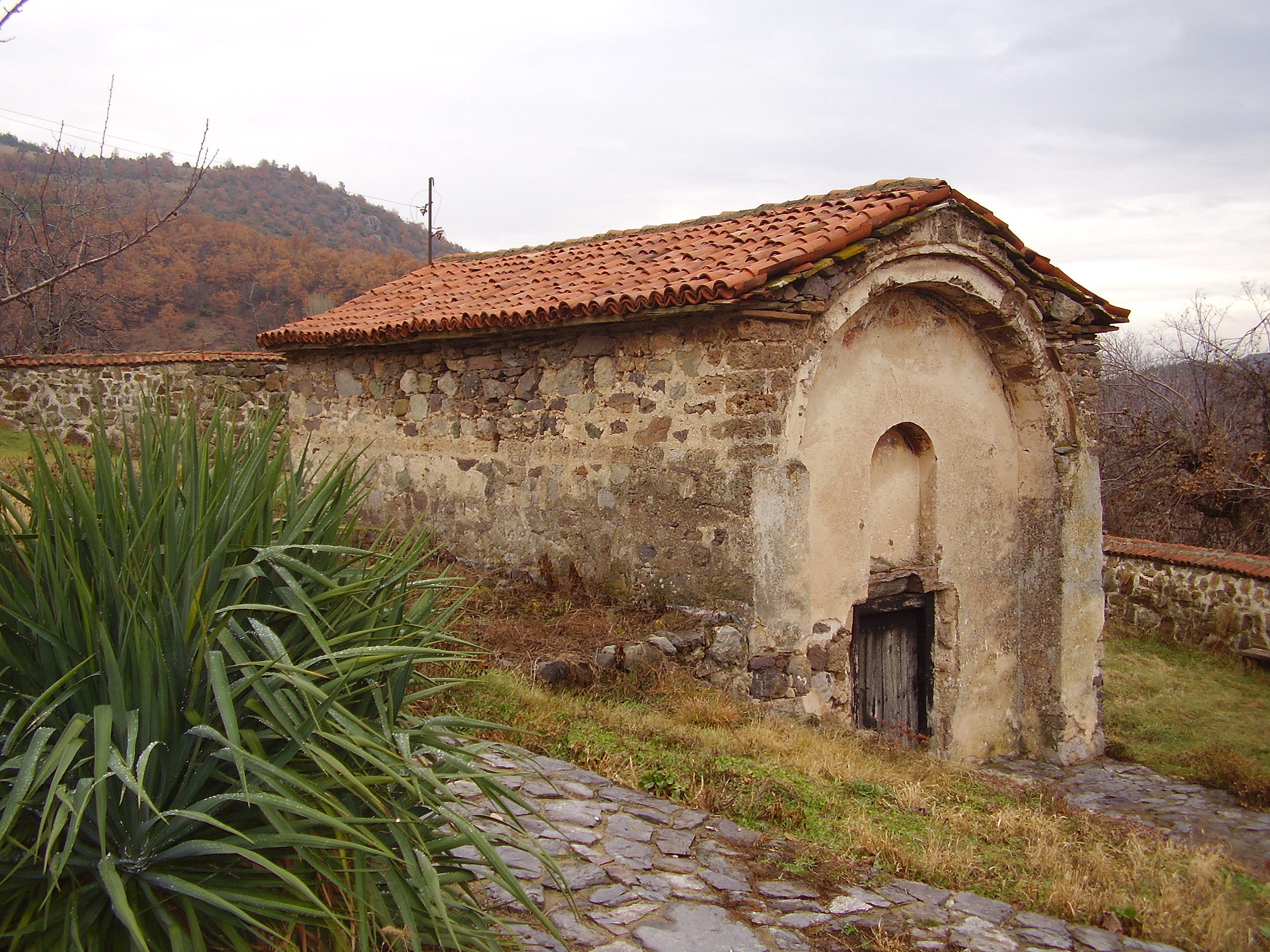
The Church St Petka in Vukovo.

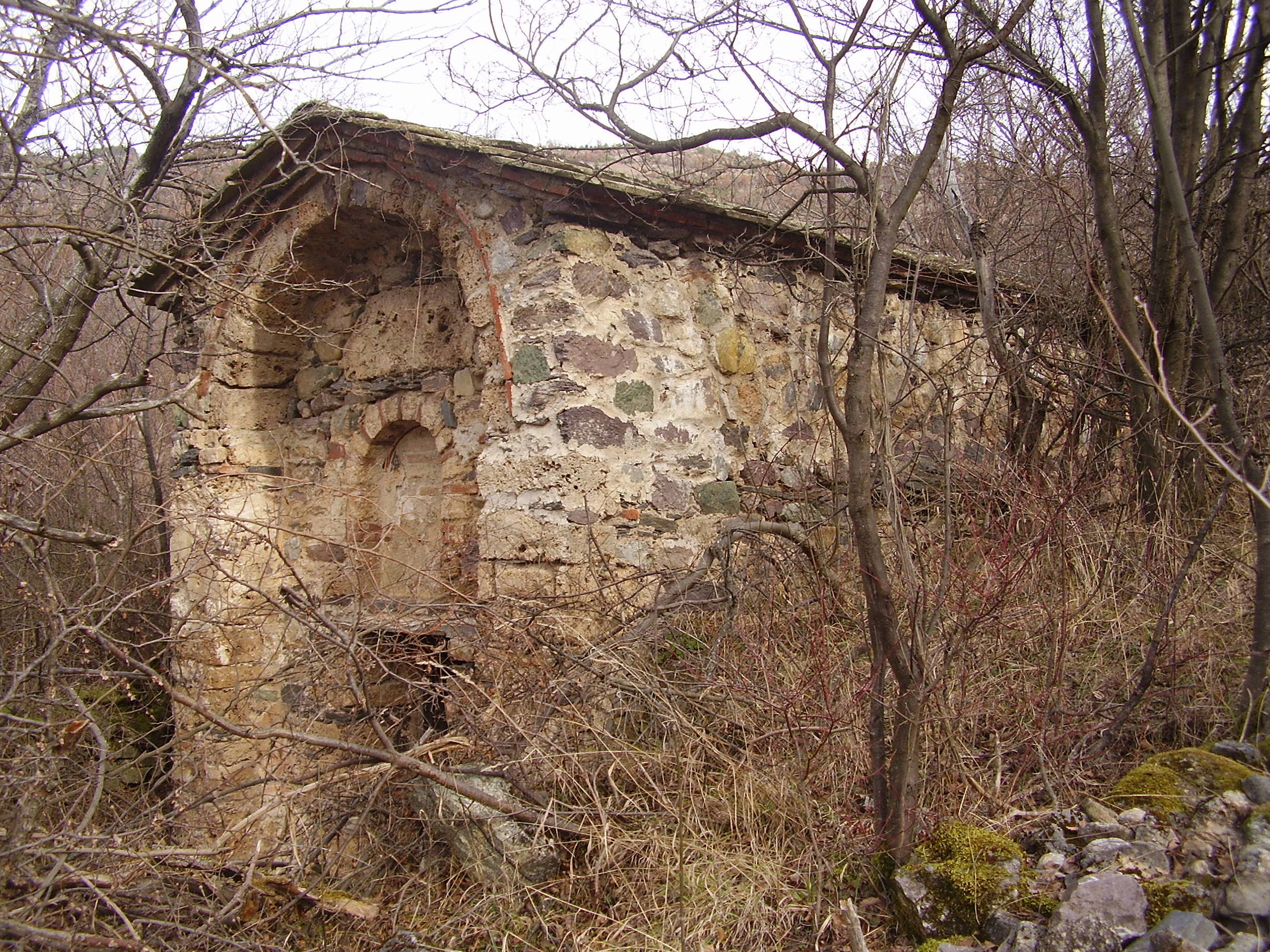
The Church St Nicholas in Vukovo.

- Fortress dated from the Late Antiquity. Located at 1,5 km to the south-west of the village in the Gradishteto locality on a height known as Chukata. Around the height there are remains of the foundations of the fortress walls built of stone and plaster. The walls surround an area of 3 decares.
- Church of St Petka. It is located in the eastern part of Vukovo. It is one nave and one apse church without narthex with wall piers which form a small arc on the western facade. Its dimensions are 8,10 x 4,34 m. The vault is semi-cylindrical. The semi-round apse has a small narrow window. It was built of stones and white plaster. The whole interior as well as the western external wall are painted. The frescoes in the church are relatively well preserved and are an important source for the development of the late medieval painting in Bulgaria and the Balkans. The church was constructed in the 16th century. The frescoes were painted in 1598 as seen from the inscription in the western side of the naos. It is an architectural and artistic monument of culture with national importance.
- Church of St Nicholas. It is situated at 2 km to the south of the village in a deep and hardly accessed dingle. It is a small one nave and one apse church without narthex and with a shallow arc on the western facade. Its dimensions are 4,43 x 2,75 m. The vault is semi-cylindrical. It was built of stones and white plaster. The roof is covered with stone plates. The church is half-dig in the ground. The whole interior and the arc on the western facade are painted but only fragments of the frescoes have remained. The church was constructed and painted in the 16th century. It is a monument of culture.

== Literature ==
- Дремсизова-Нелчинова, Цв. и Слокоска, Л. - Археологически паметници от Кюстендилски окръг, София, 1978 г., с.14.
- Танев, Стоян - Невестино, 2004 г.
