= Church of St Petka, Vukovo =

Coordinates: 42°11′25″N 22°58′06″E

The Church of St Petka (Bulgarian: Църква Света Петка) is a late Medieval Bulgarian church in the village of Vukovo, Kyustendil Province.

== Location, history, architectural and artistic features ==
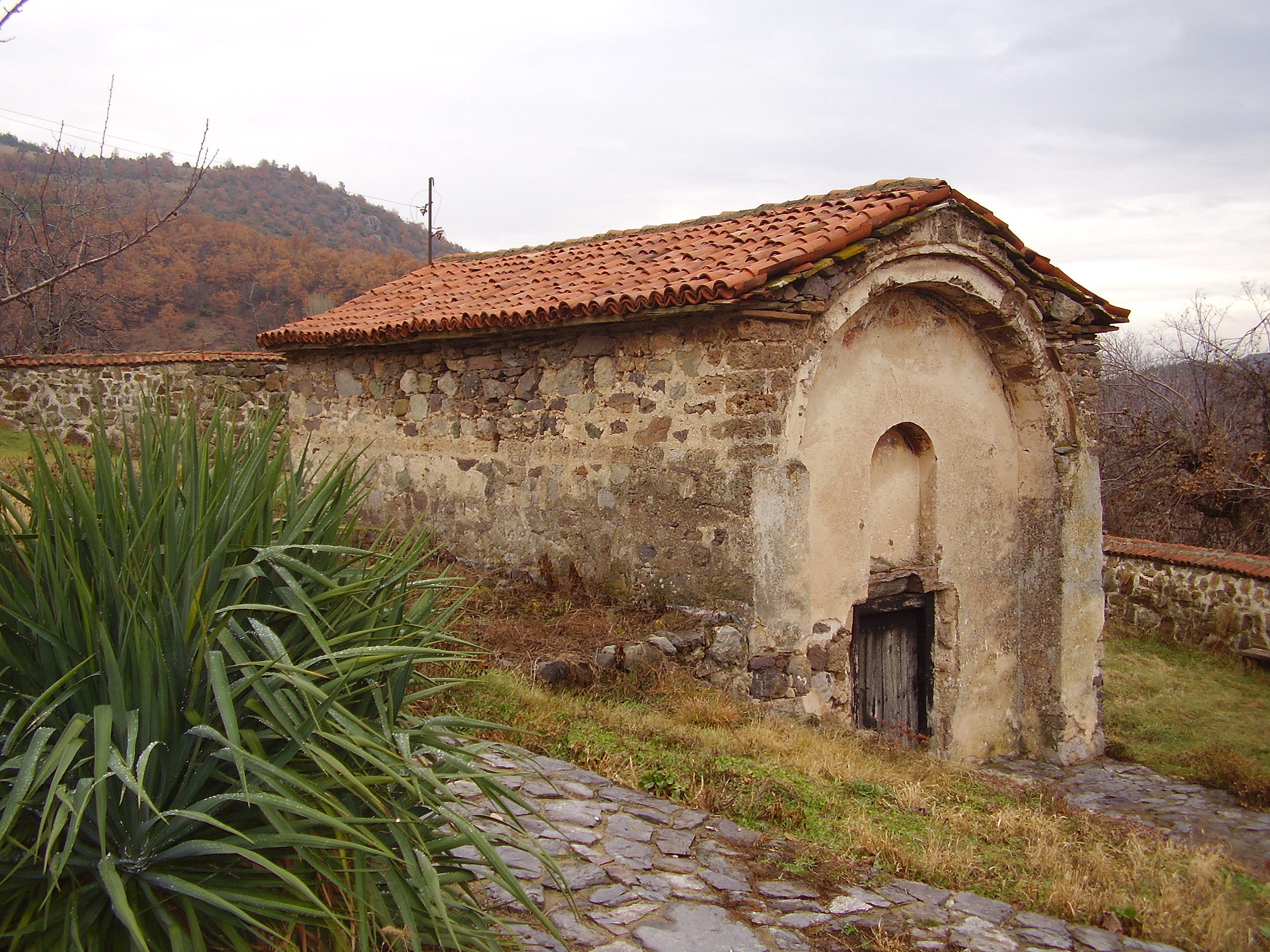
The Church of St Petka in Vukovo.

The church is situated on the left bank of the Struma River in the eastern part of the village of Vukovo, municipality of Boboshevo.

The church has one nave and one apse without a narthex, and with pilasters forming a shallow arch on the western facade. Its dimensions are 8.10 m × 4.34 m (26.6 ft × 14.2 ft). The vault is semi-cylindrical. The semicircular apse has a small, narrow window. It was built of stones and white plaster. The whole interior as well as the western external wall are painted. The frescoes in the church are relatively well preserved and are an important testimony to the development of late medieval painting in Bulgaria and the Balkans. The church was constructed in the 16th century.

The frescoes were painted in 1598, as noted in the ktitor inscription in the western side of the nave, and were paid for through donations from wealthy villagers. The frescoes feature traditional medallions with depictions of Jesus Christ on the vault, friezes of medallions with saints and prophets and full-length portraits of saints under the arcade. Among the images of saints and martyrs is one of the oldest known depictions of Saint Sava and depictions of the sainted Pope Sylvester I and St Boniface, who are popular in Catholic art. There are a number of details with influence from Italian art – the moustaches of some of the soldiers, faces in profile in the Betrayal of Judas, the knight's banner on the lance of the centurion St. Longinus in the Crucifixion and others. With its new ideas and skilfully painted frescoes, the church is among the most valuable monuments from that period in the Balkans.

The church is an architectural monument of culture (DV, is.77/1972) and an artistic monument of culture with national importance (DV, is.100/1969).

The church is named after Saint Paraskeva or Petka of Bulgaria who lived in the 10th century. From 1238 her relics were kept in the capital of the Bulgarian Empire, Tarnovo, but after the fall of the country under Ottoman domination, the relics were finally moved to Iaşi in modern Romania in 1641.

== Gallery ==
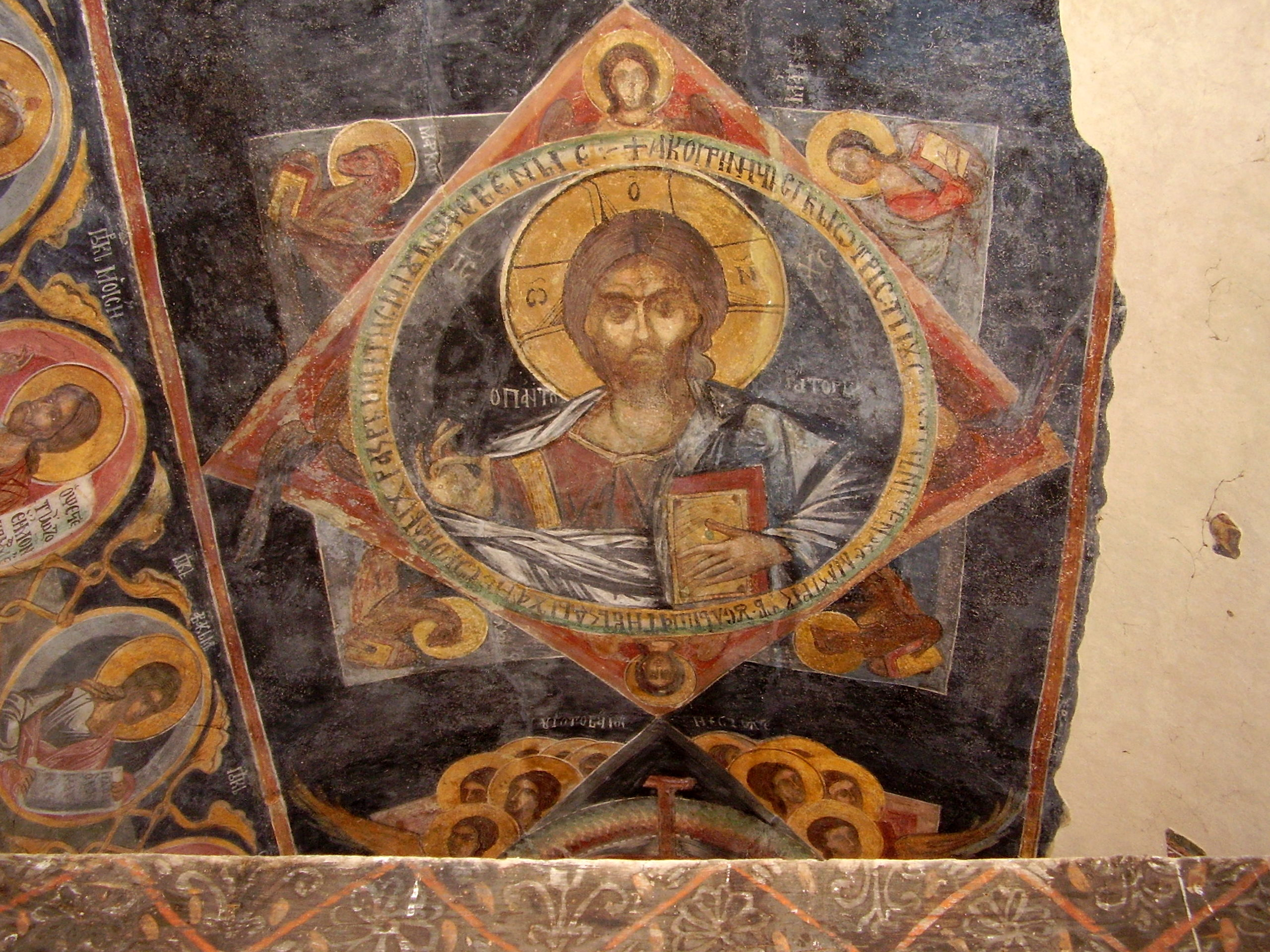

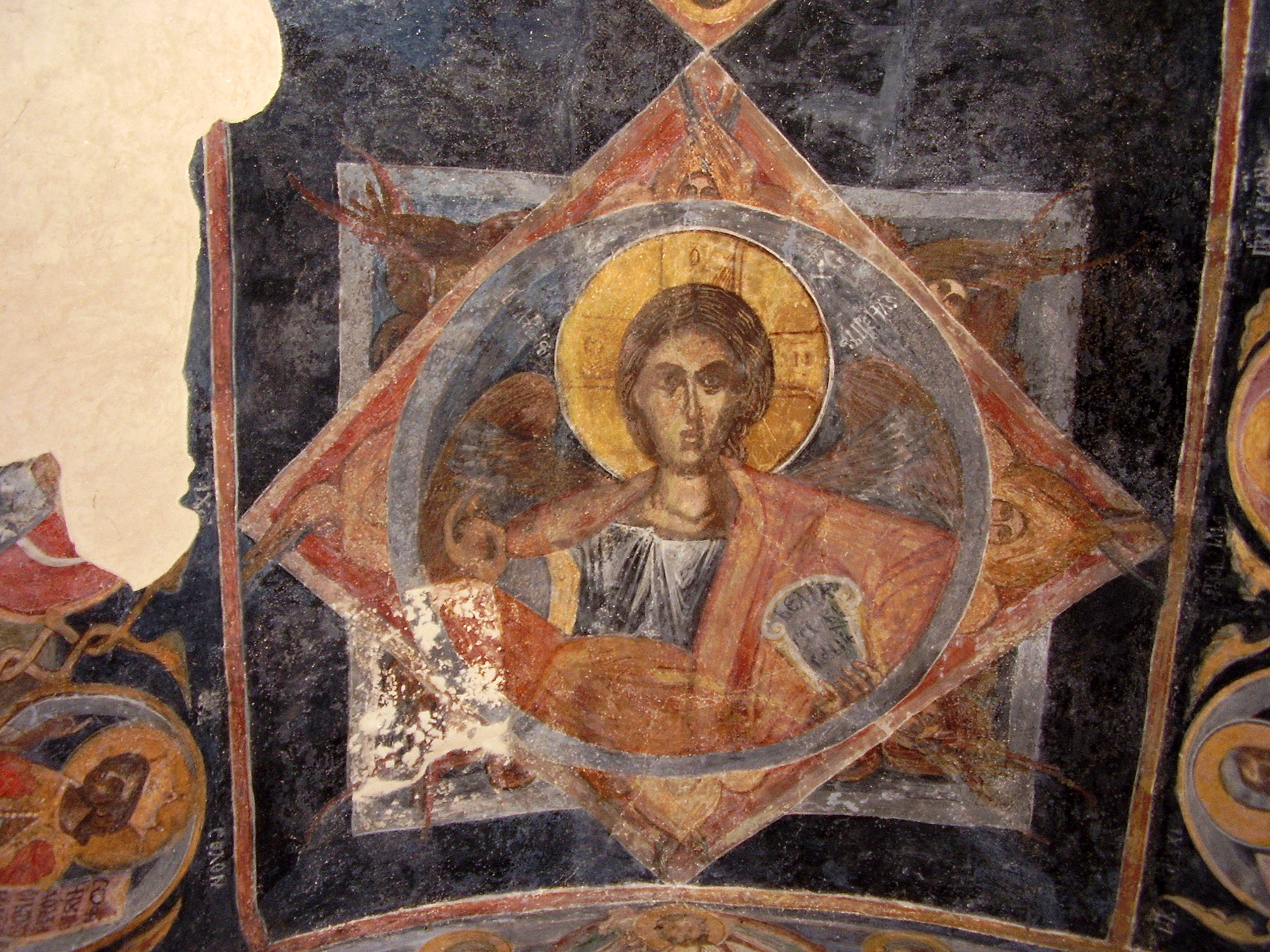

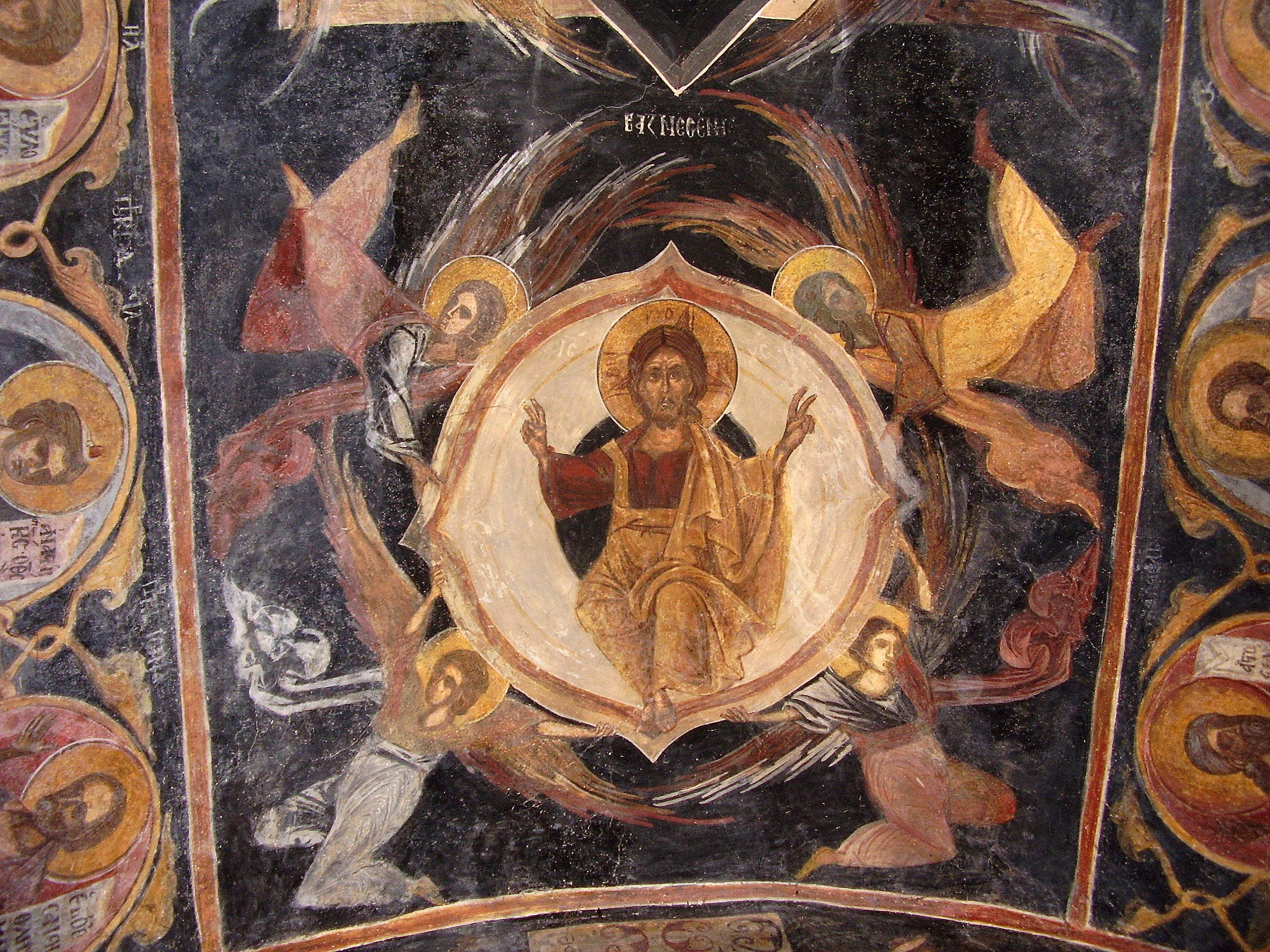

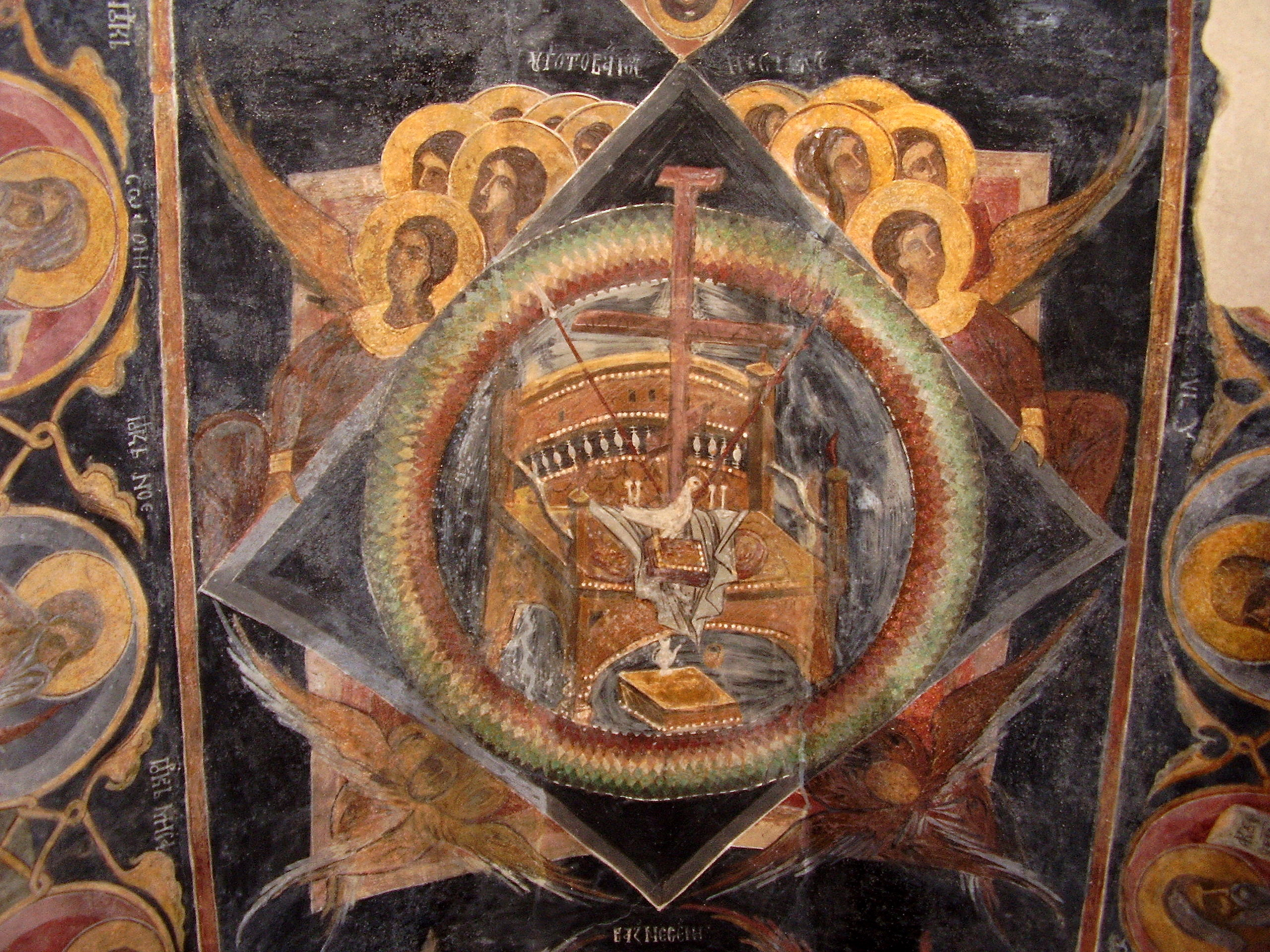

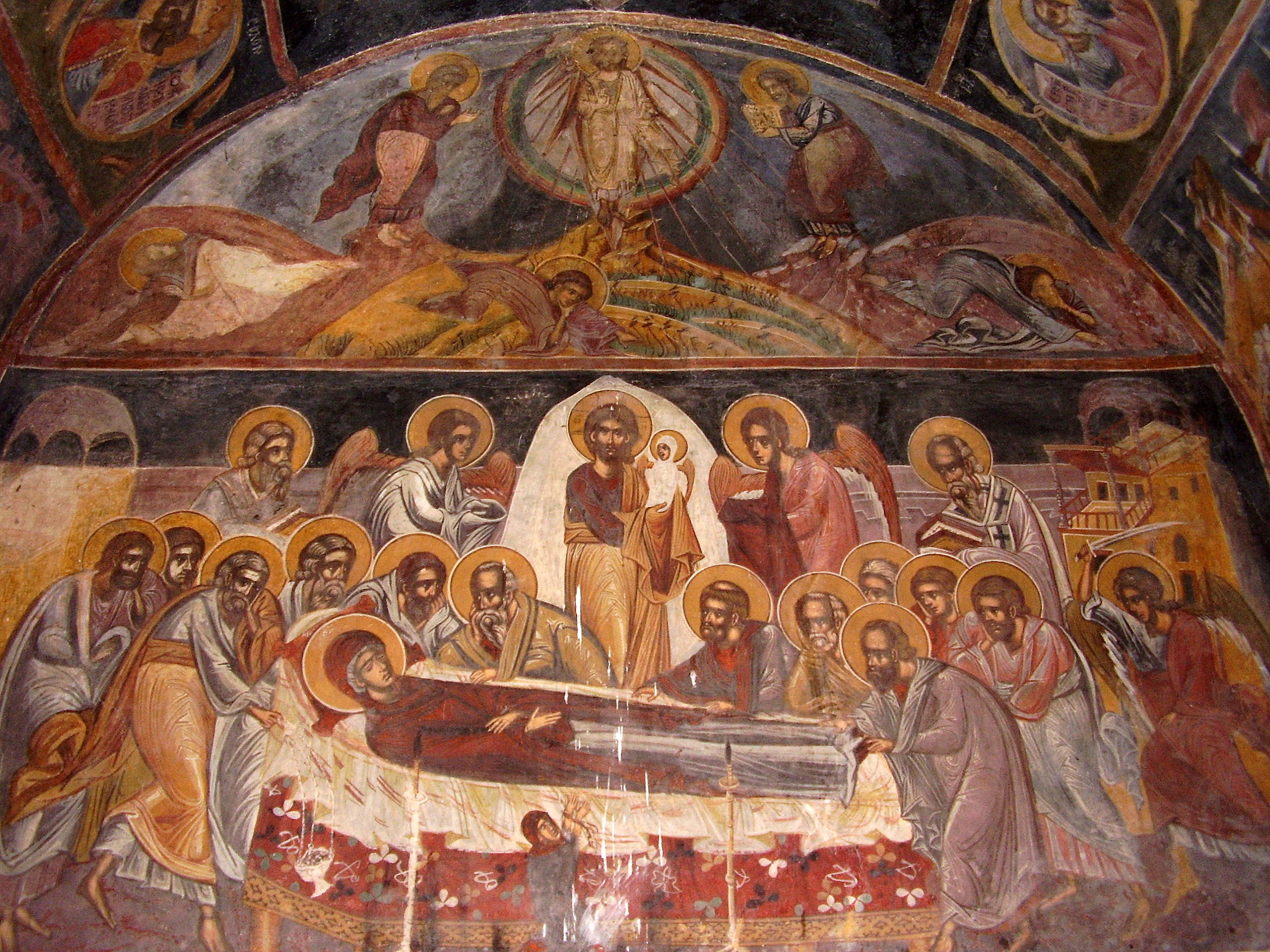

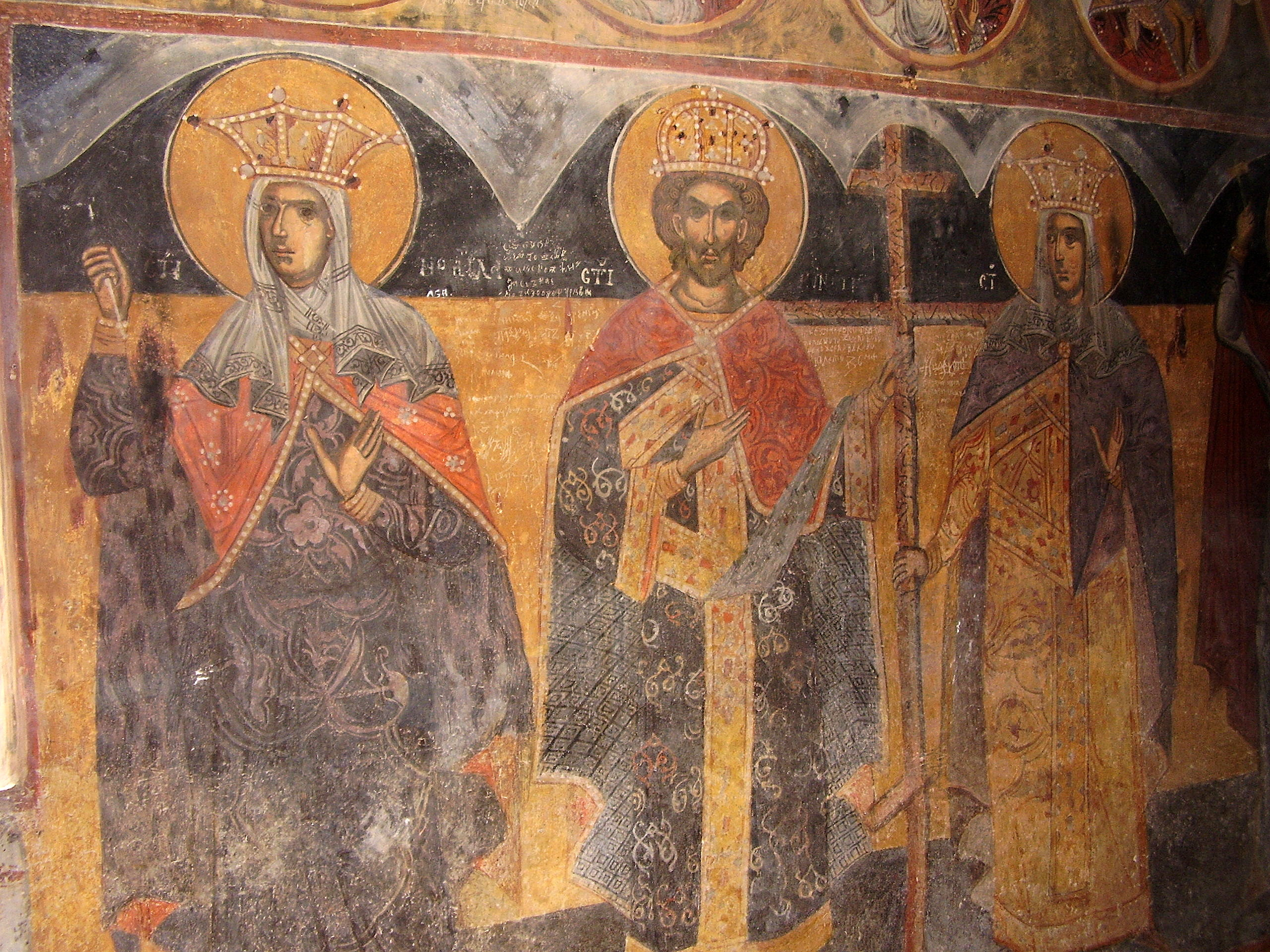

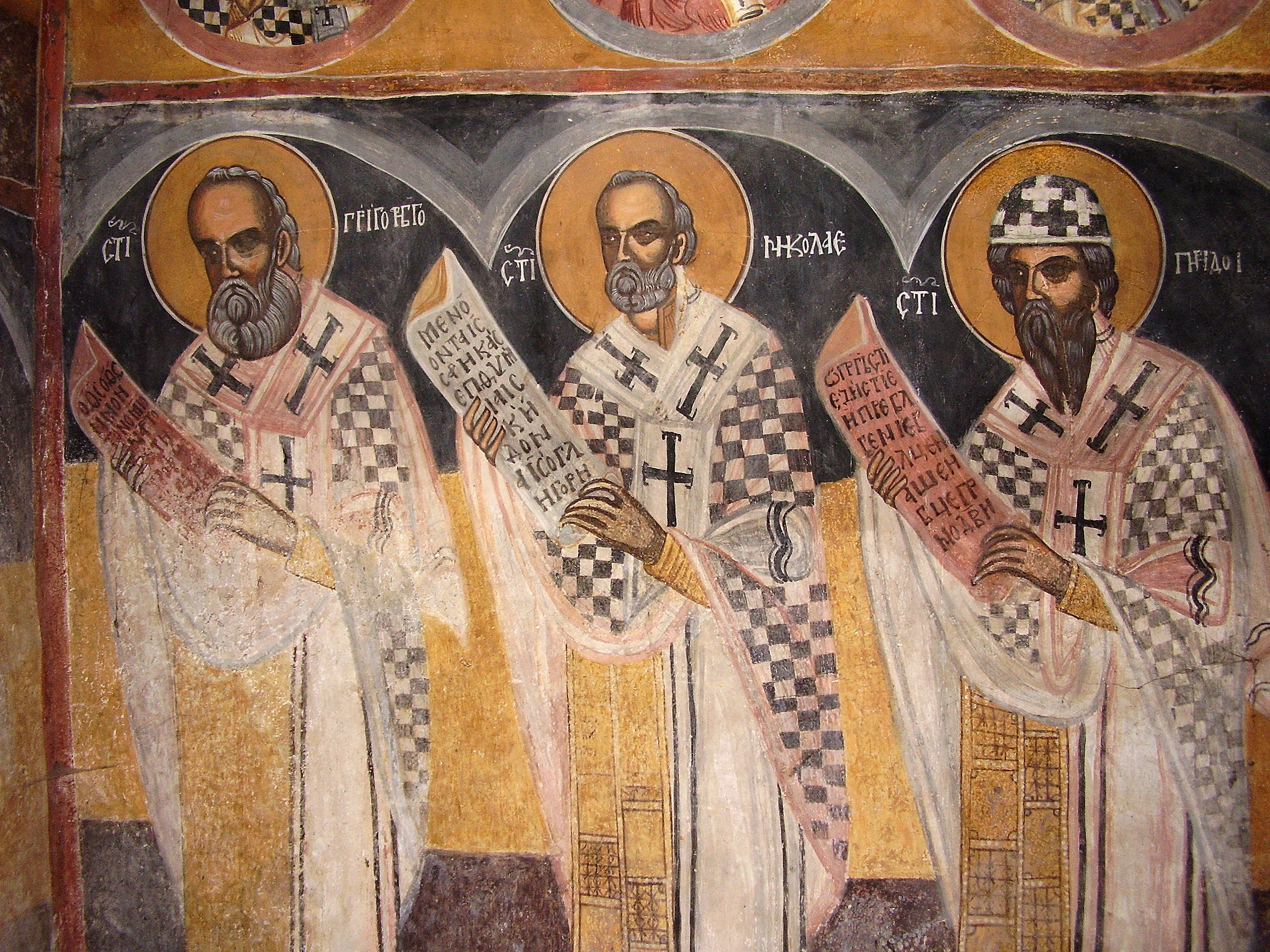

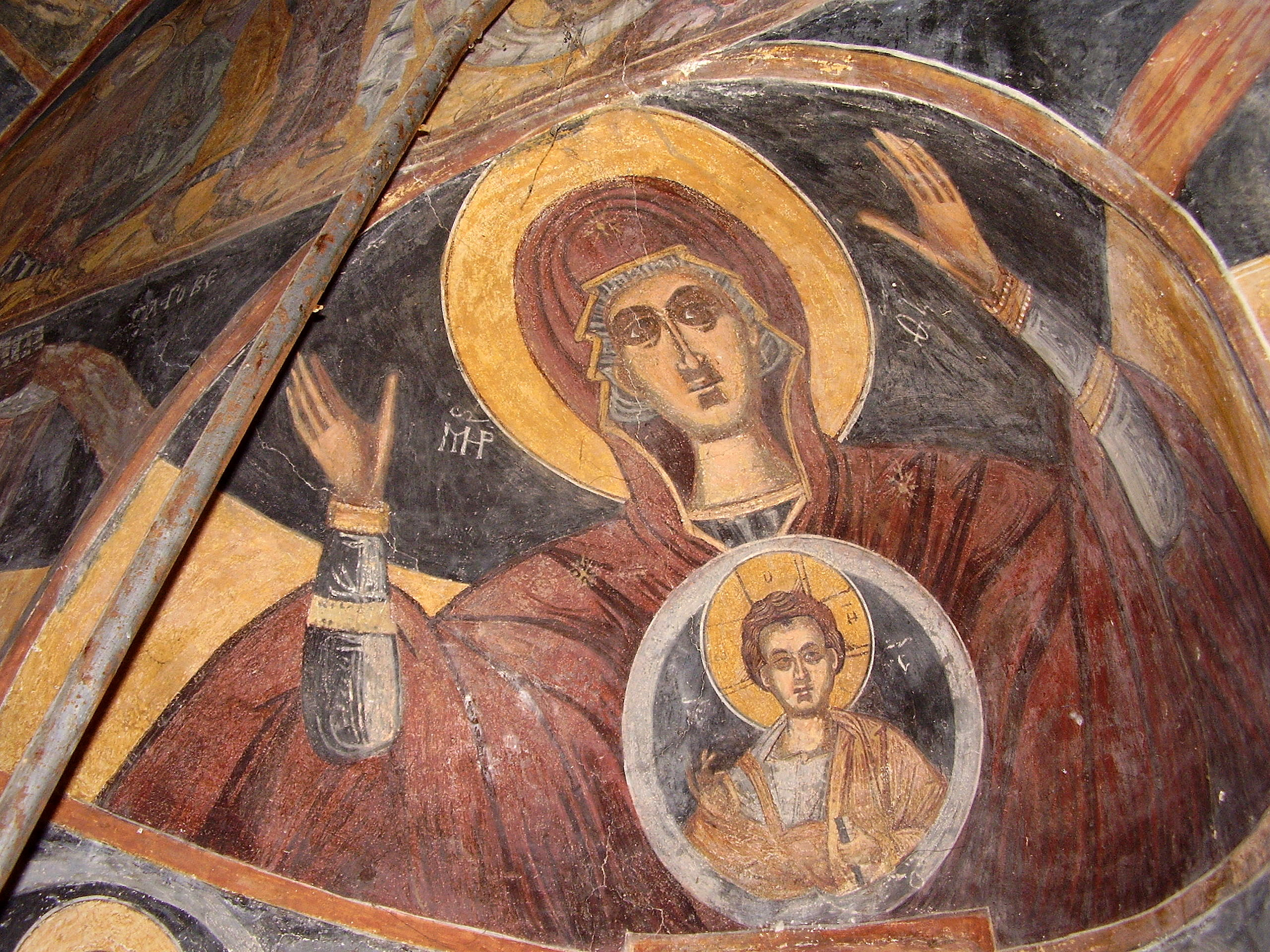

== Literature ==
- Grabar, Andre (1928). La peinture religieuse en Bulgarie (in French). Paris: Geuthner. OCLC 410730345.
- Протич, А. (1930). Денационализиране и възраждане на нашето изкуство от 1393 до 1879 г. (in Bulgarian). Сборник България 1000 г. С. pp. 198, 384, 397.
- Мавродинов, Никола (1957). Изкуството на Българското Възраждане (in Bulgarian). Sofia: Наука и изкуство. pp. 262 ff. OCLC 490316324.
- Божков, А. (1964). За някои забравени паметници на българската монументална живопис от XVІ век. (in Bulgarian). Vol. 9–10. pp. 47 ff.
- Василиев, Асен (1964). Проучвания на изобразителните изкуства из някои селища по долината на Струма. Известия на Института за изобразителни изкуства (in Bulgarian). VII: 151 ff.
- Панайотова, Д (1965). Църквата "Св.Петка" при с.Вуково. Известия на Института за изобразителни изкуства (in Bulgarian). VIIІ: 221–257.
- Марди, В. (1968). Бабикова - Научно мотивирано предложение за обявяване на църквата "Св.Петка" в с.Вуково, Кюстендилско за паметник на културата (in Bulgarian). Sofia: Архив НИПК.
- Дремсизова-Нелчинова, Цв; Слокоска, Л. (1978). Археологически паметници от Кюстендилски окръг (in Bulgarian). Sofia: Septemvri. p. 14. OCLC 407000884.
- Флорева, Елена (1987). Средновековни стенописи Вуково (1598) (in Bulgarian). Sofia. OCLC 762369000.
- Енциклопедичен речник КЮСТЕНДИЛ А-Я. С. (in Bulgarian). Sofia: Българска академия на науките. 1988. OCLC 402652353.
- Стефанов, Павел (1989). Фрескови надписи и графити във Вуково (1598) (in Bulgarian). Vol. 1. Palaeobulgarica/Старобългаристика. pp. 67–80.
- Минчева, Калина (2007). "Църквата "Св.Петка" в с.Вуково". В: Църкви и манастири от Югозападна България през XV-XVII в. (in Bulgarian). Sofia: ЦСВП "Проф.Иван Дуйчев" към СУ "Св.Климент Охридски". pp. 35–37.
- Заедно по свещените места на планината Осогово. Пътеводител. (in Bulgarian). Sofia. 2008. p. 106.
- Минчева, Калина (2010). Манастири и манастирска мрежа в Кюстендилския санджак през XV-XVII век. (in Bulgarian). Sofia: Вакон. (Studia Slavico-Byzantina et Mediaevalia Europensia, X).
