= Church of St Nicholas, Vukovo =

Coordinates: 42°11′22″N 22°58′40″E

The Church of St Nicholas (Bulgarian: Църква Свети Николай) is a late Medieval Bulgarian church near the village of Vukovo, Kyustendil Province.

== Location, history, architectural and artistic features ==
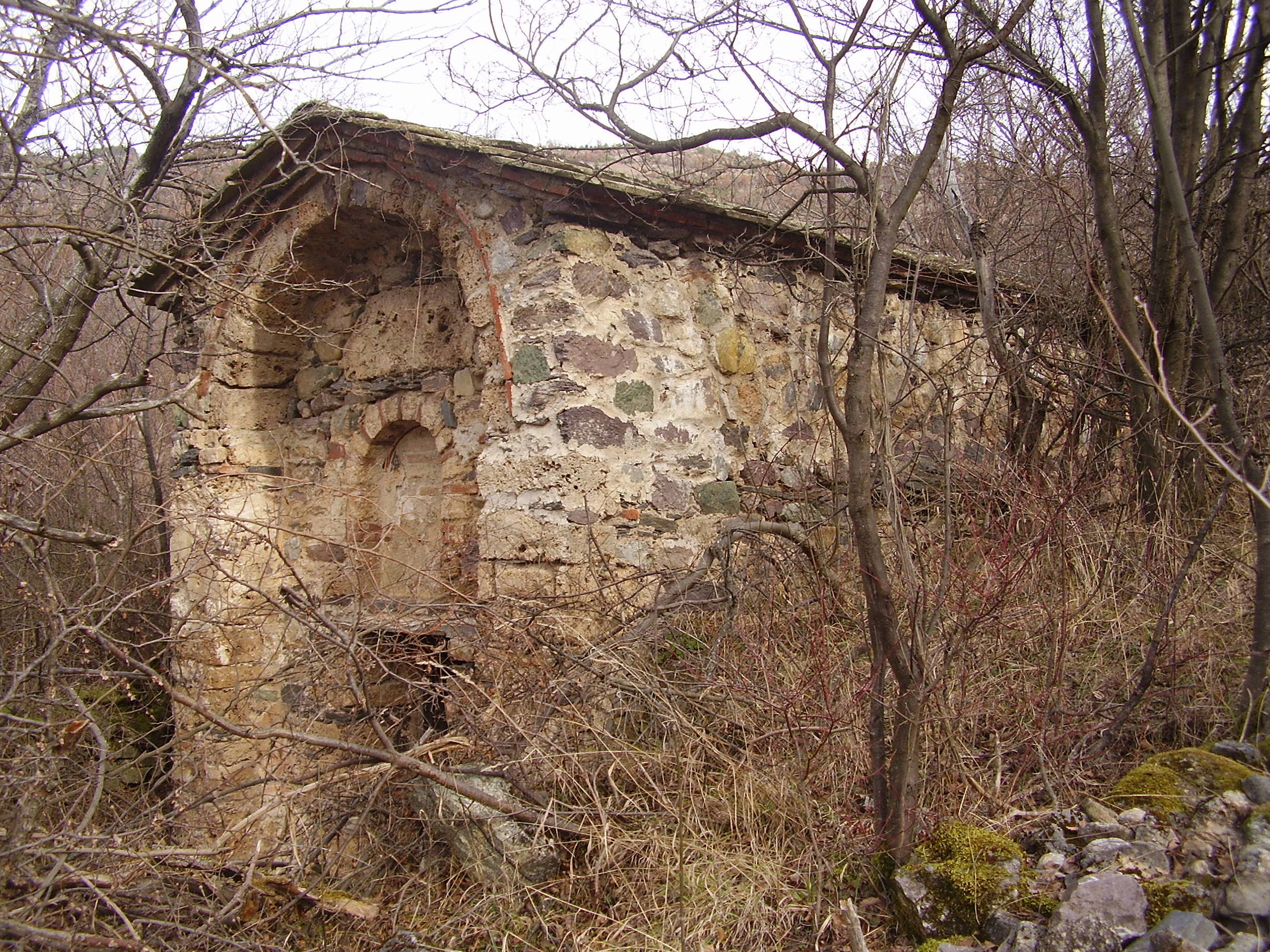
St Nicholas Church in Vukovo.

The church is situated at 2 km to the south of Vukovo, municipality of Boboshevo, in a deep and hardly accessed dingle. It is a small one nave and one apse church without narthex and with a shallow arc on the western facade. Its dimensions are 4,43 x 2,75 m. The vault is semi-cylindrical. It was built of stones and white plaster. The roof is covered with stone plates. The church is half-dig in the ground. The whole interior and the arc on the western facade are painted but only fragments of the frescoes have remained. The church was constructed and painted in the 16th century.

The church is an architectural monument of culture of local significance (DV, is.77/1968) and artistic monument of culture with national importance (DV, is.100/1969).

It is named after Saint Nicholas of Myra. The day of the saint is celebrated on 6 December.

== Literature ==
- Василиев, Асен - Проучвания на изобразителните изкуства из някои селища по долината на Струма. - Известия на Института за изобразителни изкуства, VII, 1964 г., с.153;
- Дремсизова-Нелчинова, Цв. и Слокоска, Л. - Археологически паметници от Кюстендилски окръг, София, 1978 г., с.14;
- Заедно по свещените места на планината Осогово. Пътеводител, София, 2008 г., изд.РИМ - Кюстендил, печат.Дийор Принт ООД, с.110;

== Gallery ==
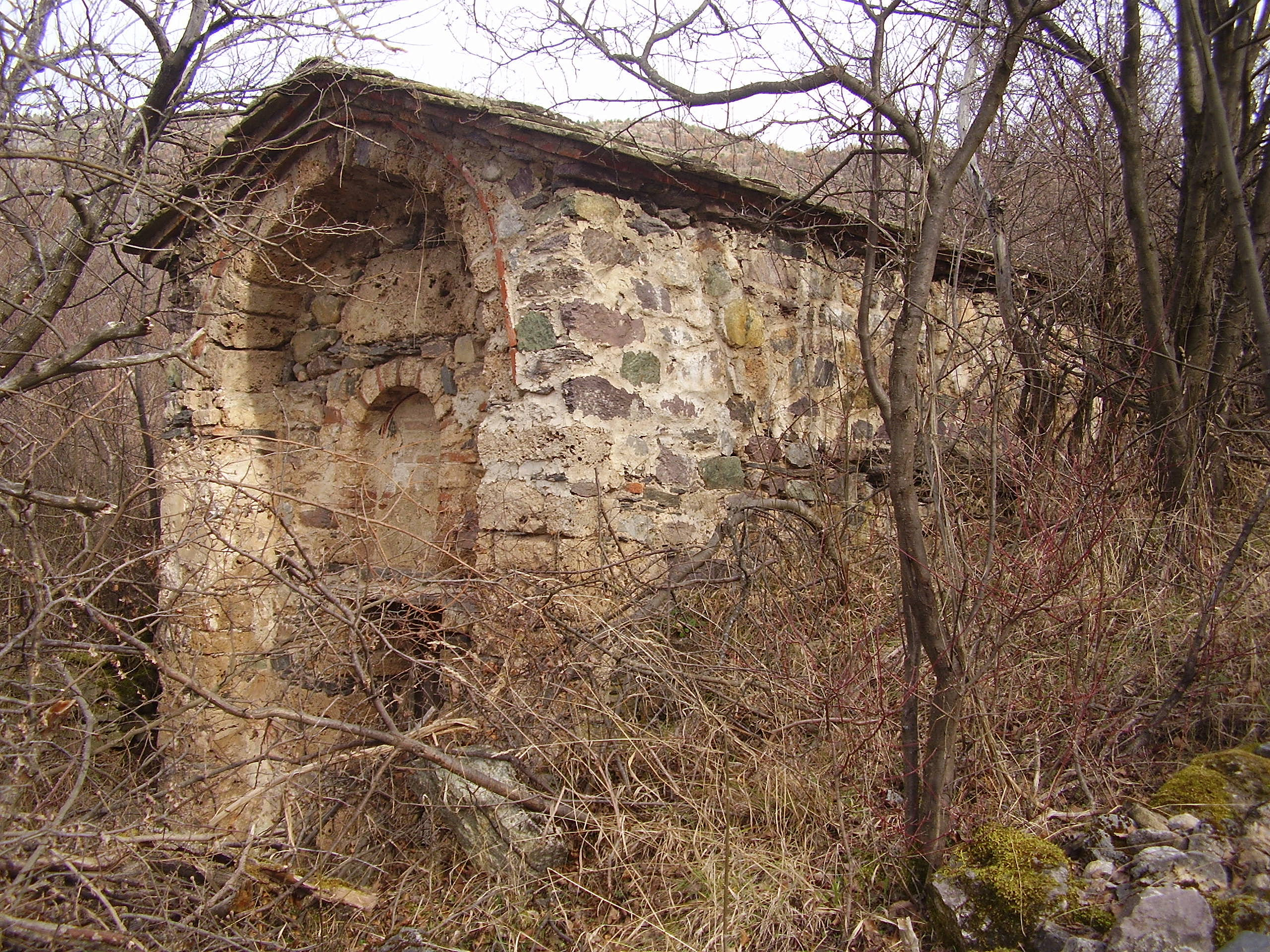

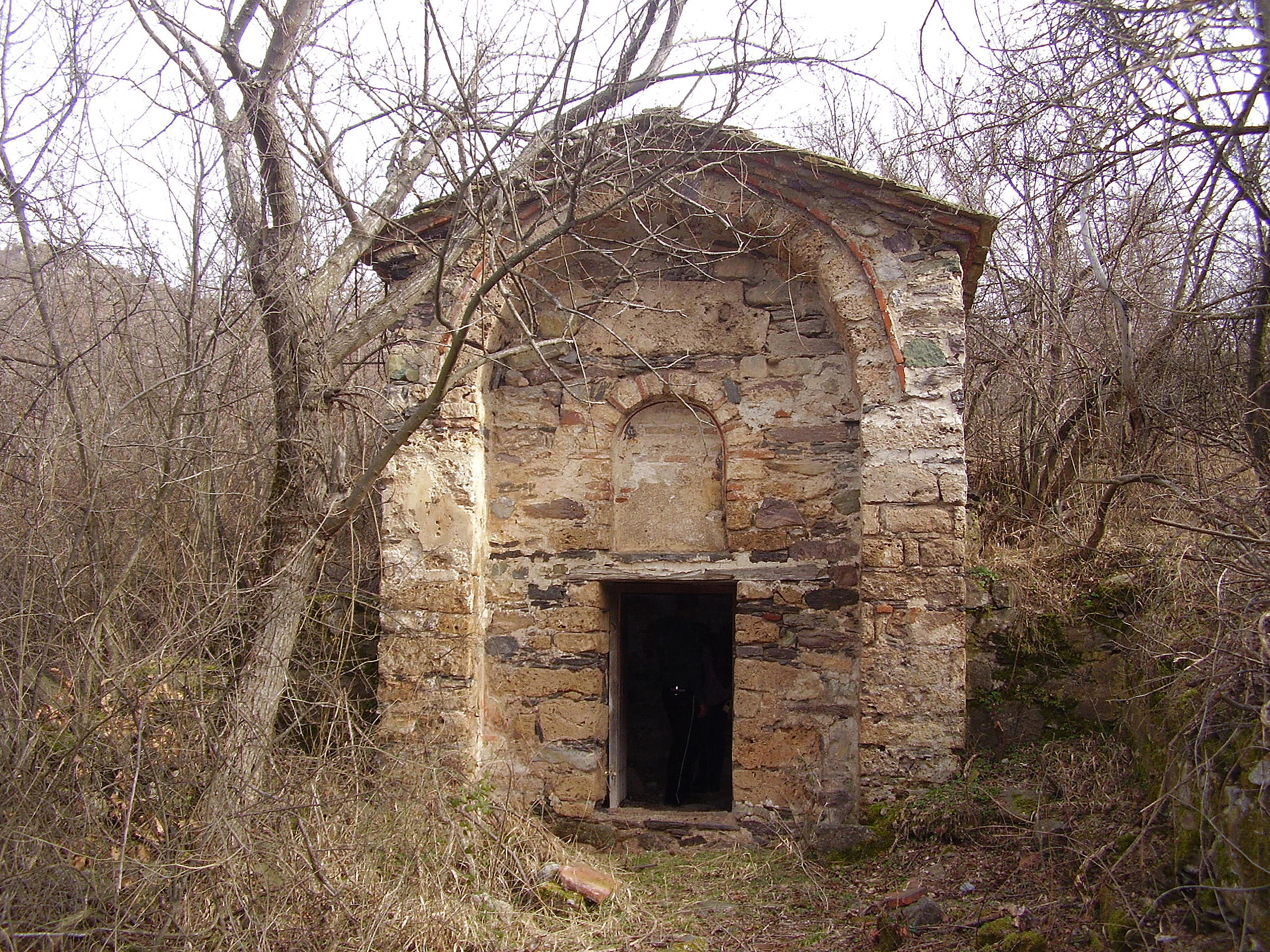

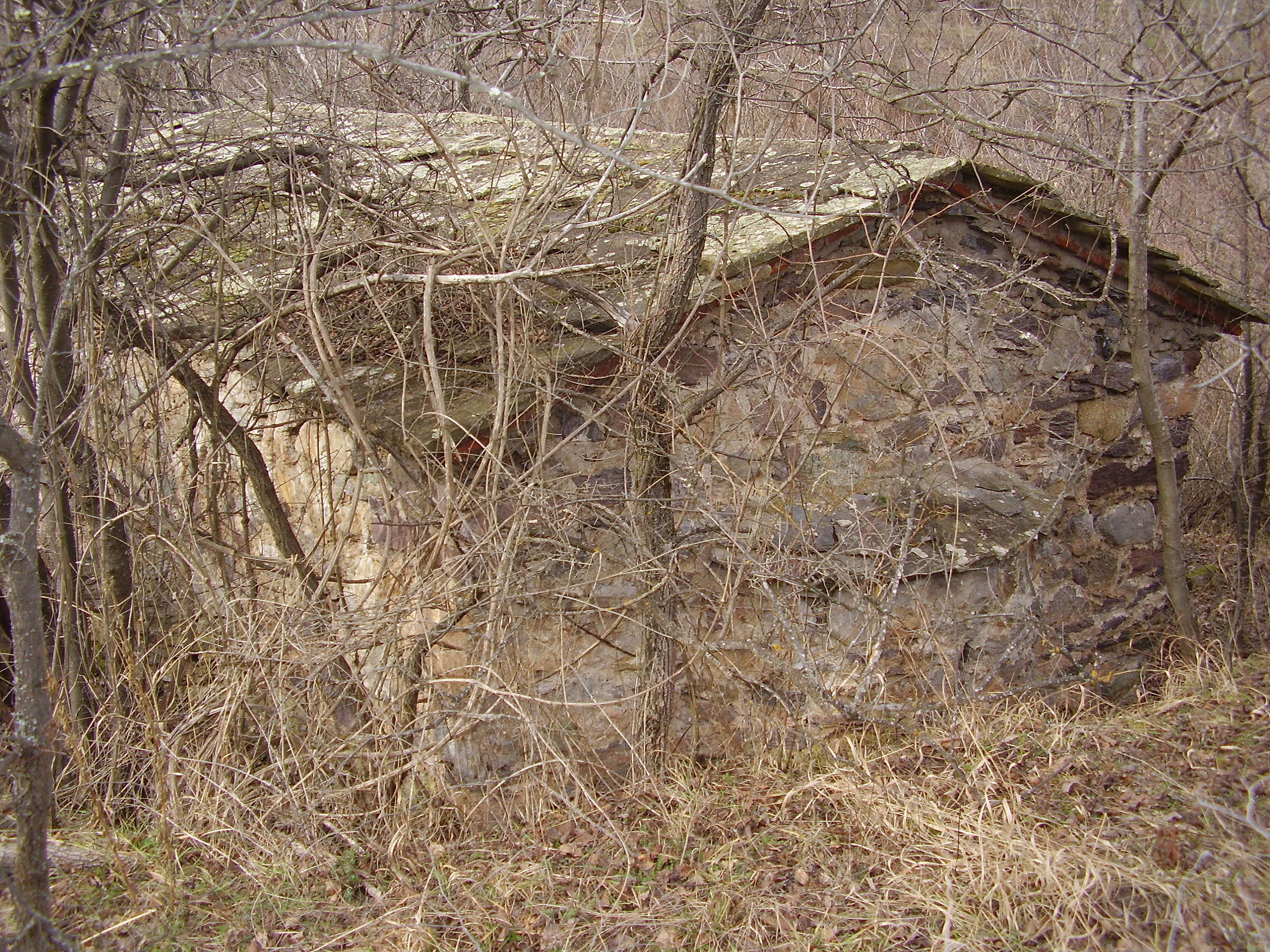

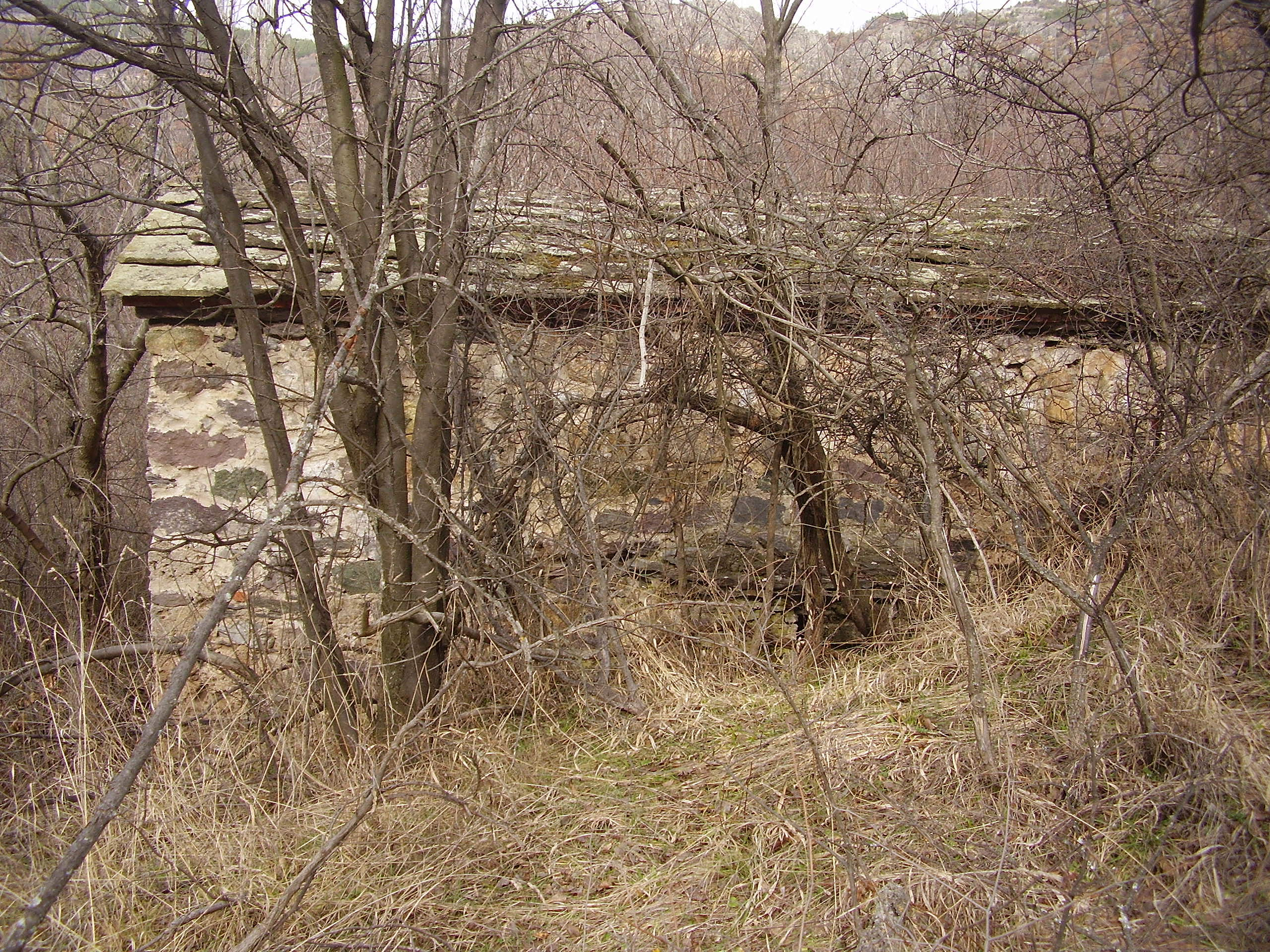

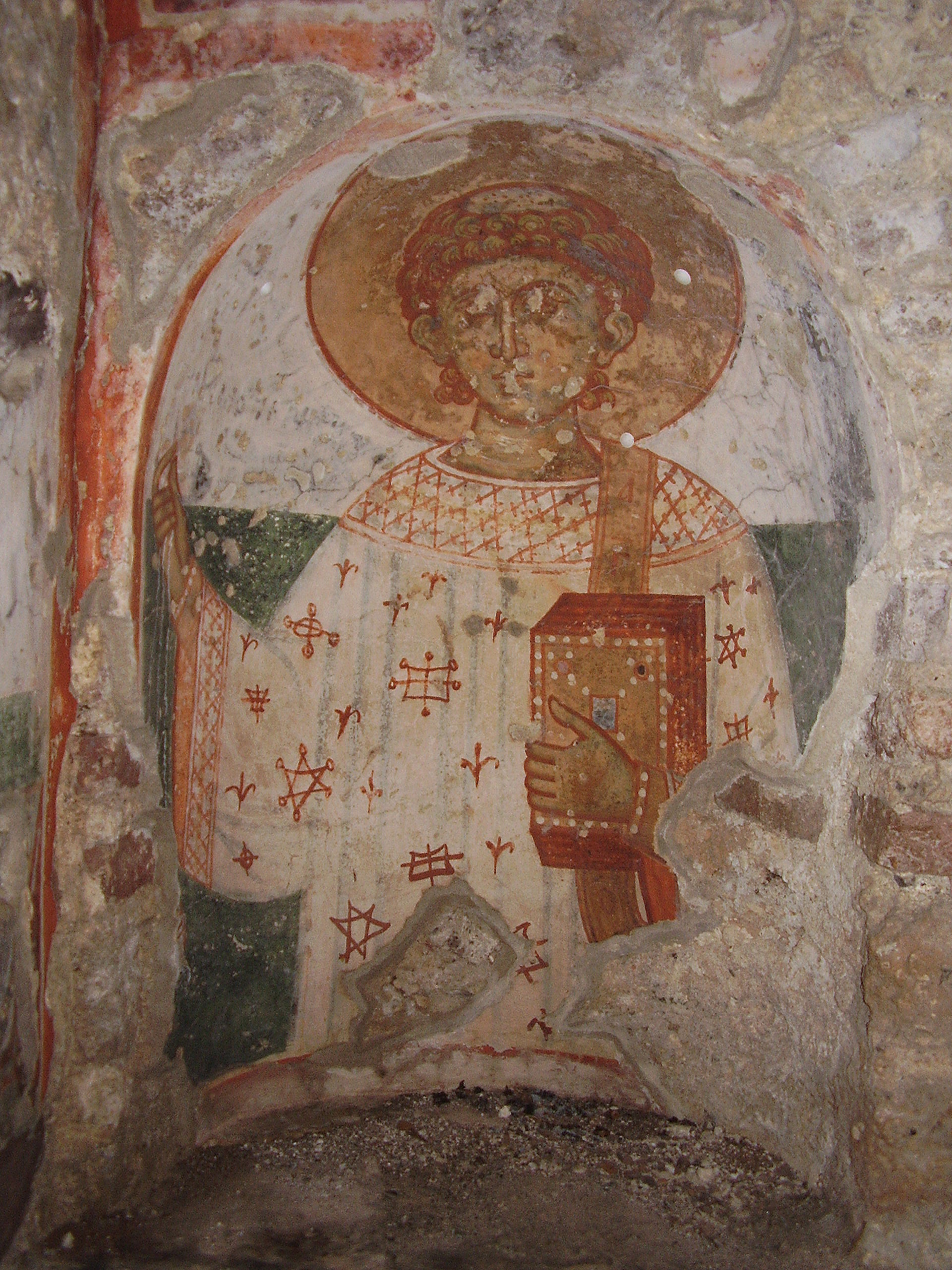

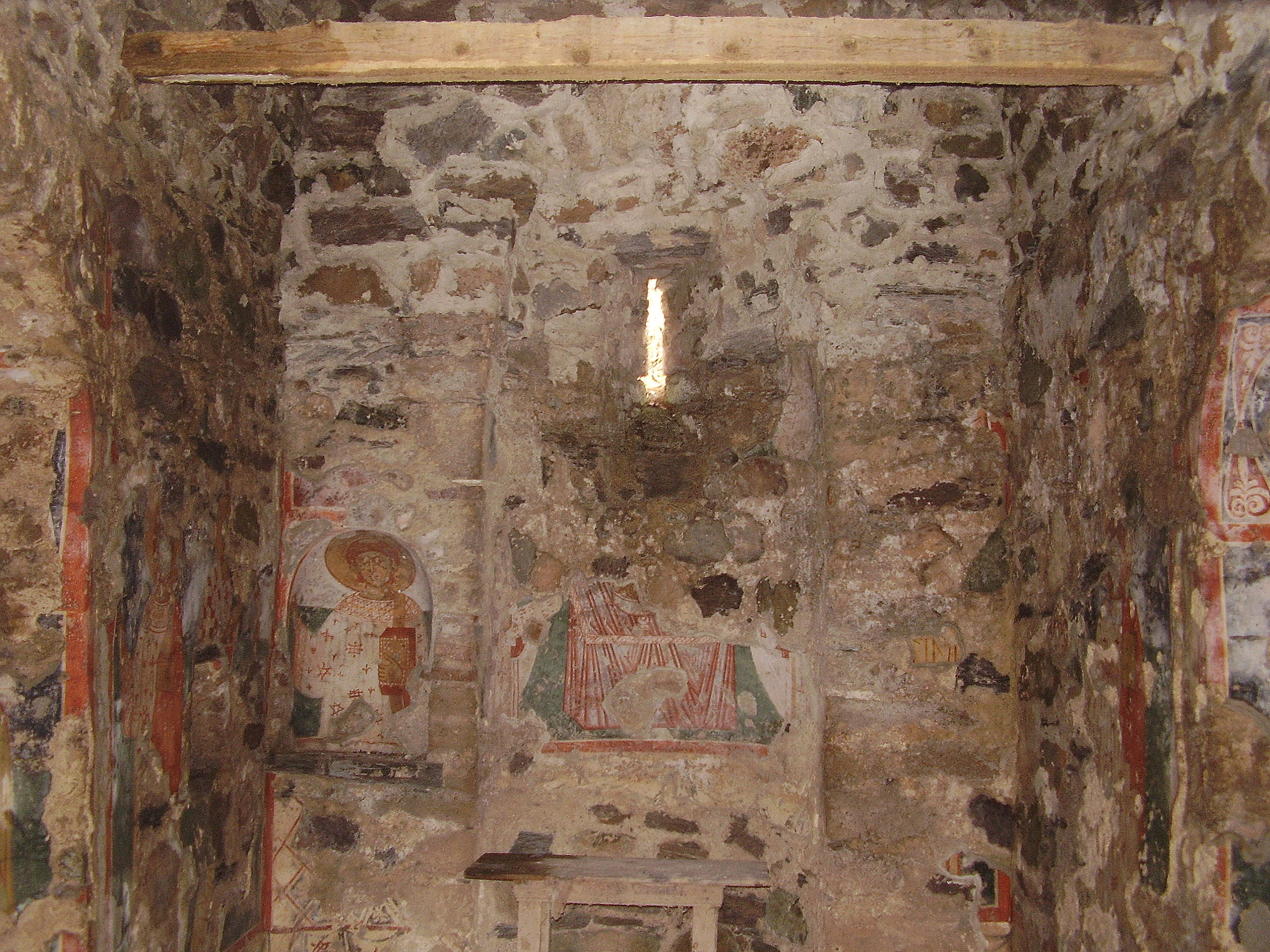

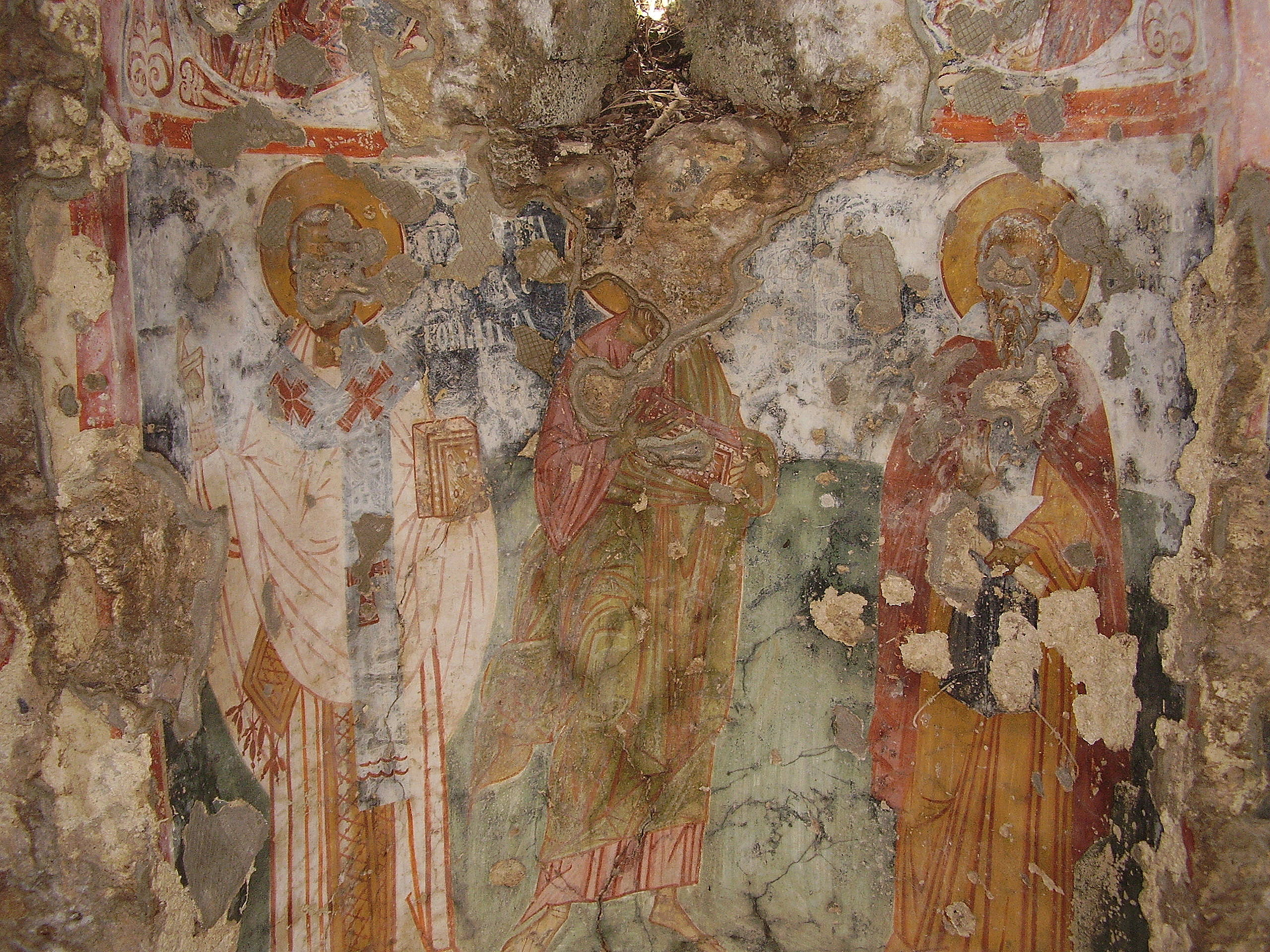

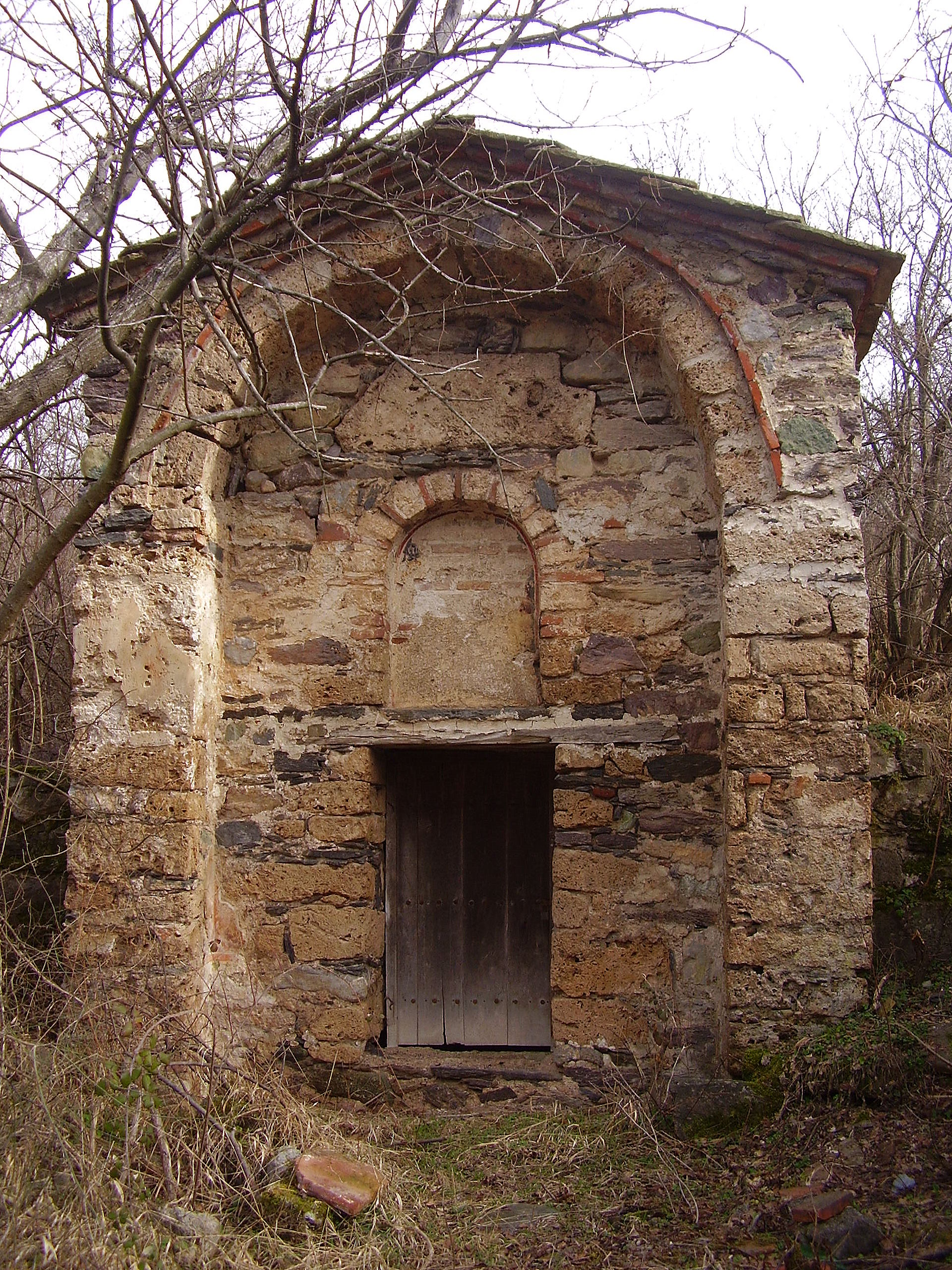
