= Albanian Ionian Sea Coast =

Albanian coastline of the north-eastern Ionian Sea

- Coast
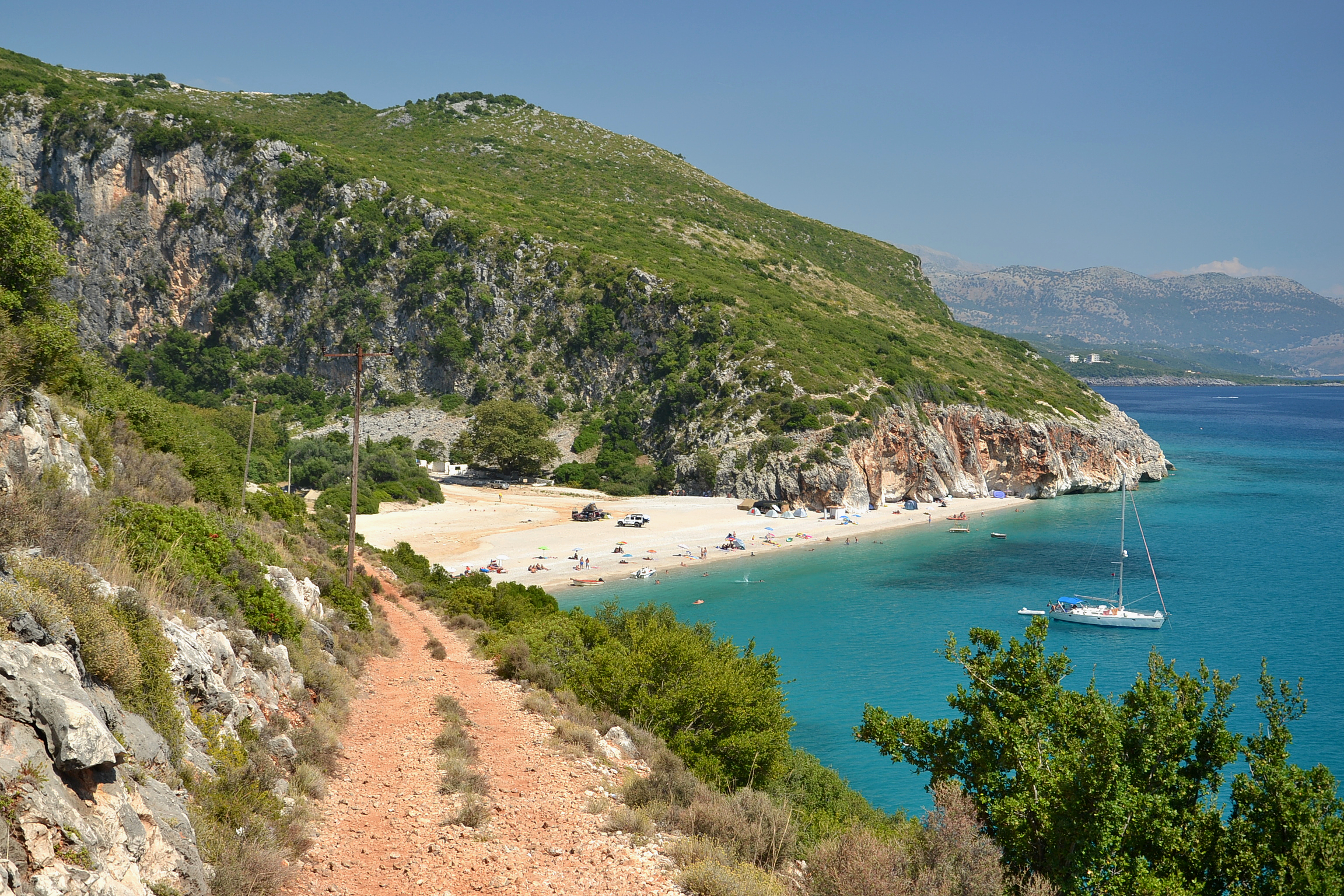
- The bay and canyon of Gjipe

- Location within Albania Location within Europe
- Coordinates: 39°44′50″N 19°58′51″E
- Location: Ionian Sea in Albania; Balkan Peninsula

Dimensions
  - Length: 446 kilometres (277 mi)

The Albanian Ionian Sea Coast (Albanian pronunciation: [brɛˈɡdɛ:ti jˈɔn] — Albanian: Bregdeti Jon) is a coastline of the north-eastern Ionian Sea, that encompasses the south-western border of the Republic of Albania, stretching from the southern half of Karaburun Peninsula, across the historical region of Labëria, the city of Sarandë, the mountains of the Ceraunians, and the Albanian Riviera, to the Lake of Butrint, where the Strait of Corfu separates the country from Greece.

Albania is located in Southern and South-eastern Europe in the western section of the Balkan Peninsula. It borders on Montenegro to the north-west, Kosovo to the north-east, North Macedonia to the east, Greece to the south, and the Mediterranean Sea to the west. The coastline occupies a total length of 446 kilometres (277 mi) and explicitly marked by a mountainous landscape supplied with deep bays, numerous islands, high cliffs, rocky and sandy coasts and unique marine life.

The Ionian Sea is an arm of the Mediterranean Sea positioned south of the Adriatic Sea, which extend from Sicily up to the Strait of Otranto between Salento and Bay of Vlorë. It is surrounded by Italy in the west, and Greece and Albania in the east. Though considered by ancient authors to be part of the Adriatic Sea, the Ionian Sea is at present seen as a separate body of water.

Traditionally, the region has represented the most valuable tourist resource for the country, especially due to the unspoiled natural and cultural beauty expressed in the region's architecture, cuisine and tradition. Its most considerable attraction is the ancient city of Butrint, that is listed as a UNESCO World Heritage Site, because it provides valuable remains of ancient civilizations.

The region is populated by more than 50,000 people with the largest city being the seaport city of Sarandë, one of the most appreciated tourist destinations in the Ionian Sea. Sarandë is served by Port of Sarandë, one of the largest of the country, which has become a notable sailing and cruise port. The region is very scenic, with wild coastlines, mountains and a very substantial proportion of native forest. Some of the most prominent beaches along the coastline are Dhërmi, Himara, Qeparo, Borsh, Lukovë, Vuno and Ksamil.

The Albanian Ionian Sea Coast is known for its diverse landscapes, unique traditions, and its influence on Albanian culture. It is regarded as the birthplace of the Albanian iso-polyphony which was recognised as a Masterpiece of the Oral and Intangible Heritage of Humanity.

== Environment ==
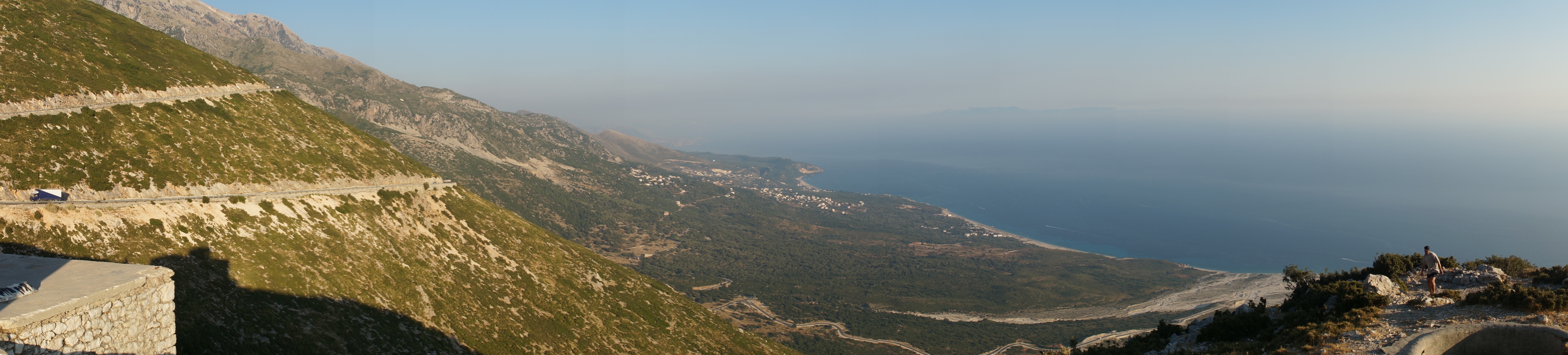
The Albanian Riviera as seen from the Llogara Pass at the Ceraunians within the Llogara National Park.

=== Geography ===
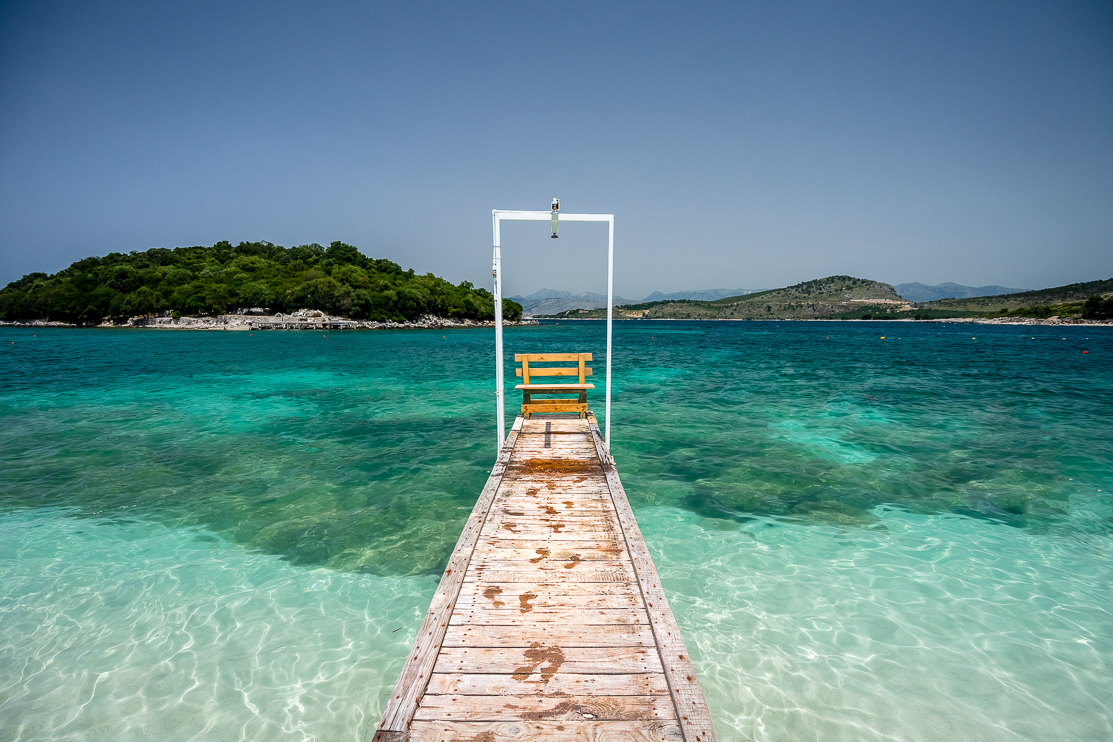
The crystal clear waters of Ksamil in the south of the coastline.

Albania is located in the southwest of the Balkan Peninsula and bordered by Montenegro to the northwest, Kosovo to the northeast, the North Macedonia to the east, and Greece to the south and southeast. Most of the country is rugged and mountainous with the Albanian Alps located in the north, the Korab Mountains in the east, the Ceraunian Mountains in the south and the Skanderbeg Mountains in the center.

Being positioned in the Northern Mediterranean Sea, the country's coast touches both, the Adriatic Sea and Ionian Sea, forming the renowned Albanian Riviera. In contrast to the mountainous terrain of the country, the western lowlands consists mostly of coastal lowlands and plains. The Albanian Ionian Sea Coast is known for its rugged natural beauty, with rocky highlands and a great marine life, while the Albanian Adriatic Sea Coast consist of sandy beaches and shallow coastal waters.

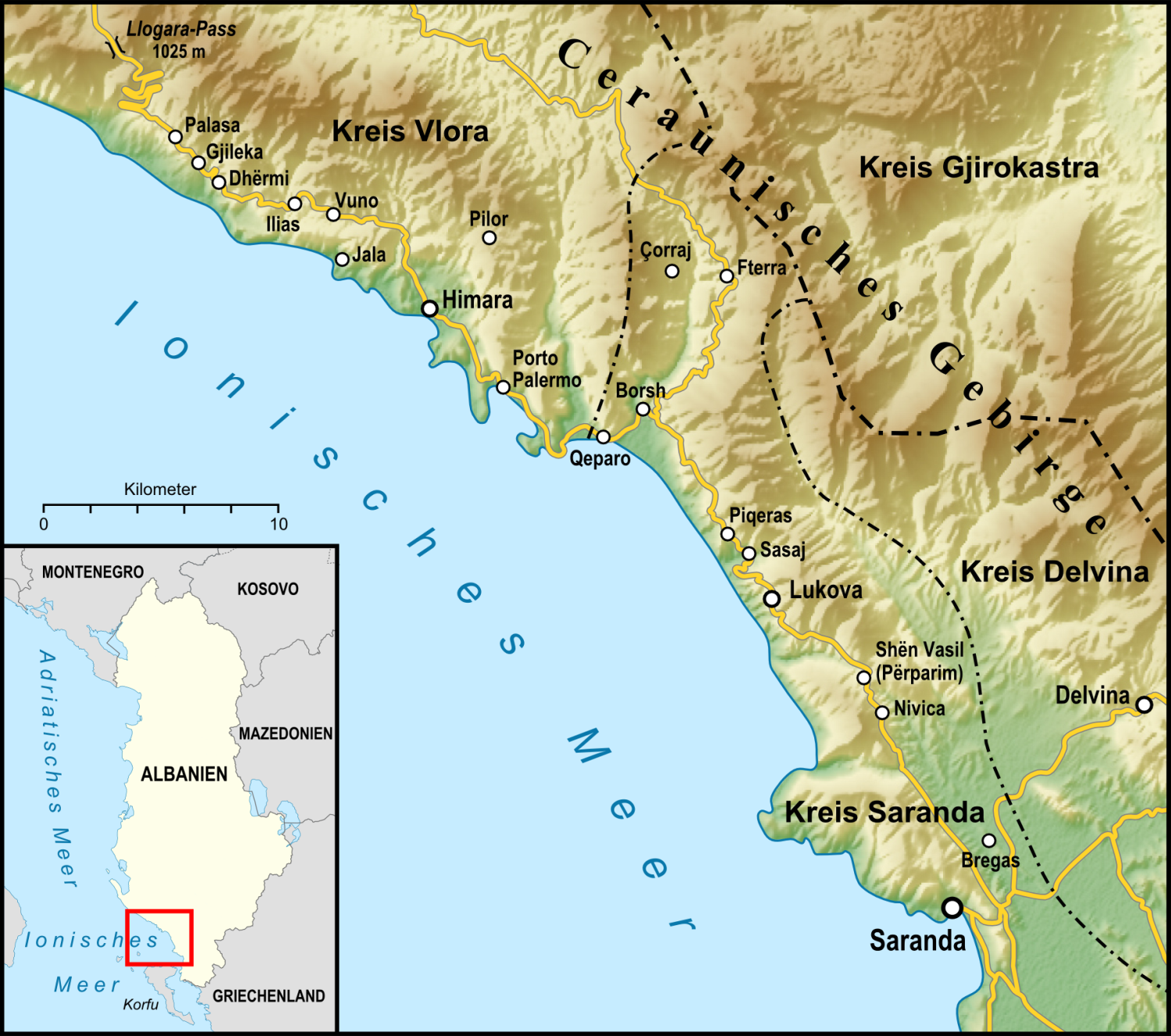
Topographical map of the Albanian Riviera.

The coastline covers an extensive part of the Ceraunian Mountains, which extends parallel immediately along the Ionian Sea, starting at Sarandë, running for over 100 kilometers in a southeast–northwest direction along the Albanian Riviera, to Orikum. The mountainous interior is fragmented into several massifs often reaching 2,000 metres above the Adriatic. This unique mountainous structure reaches its highest point at Maja e Çikës, and is full of wide and steep terraces that slope down towards the sea. The extreme southern region has a flat and shallow character with the presence of Lake Butrint that was formed during the quaternary period.

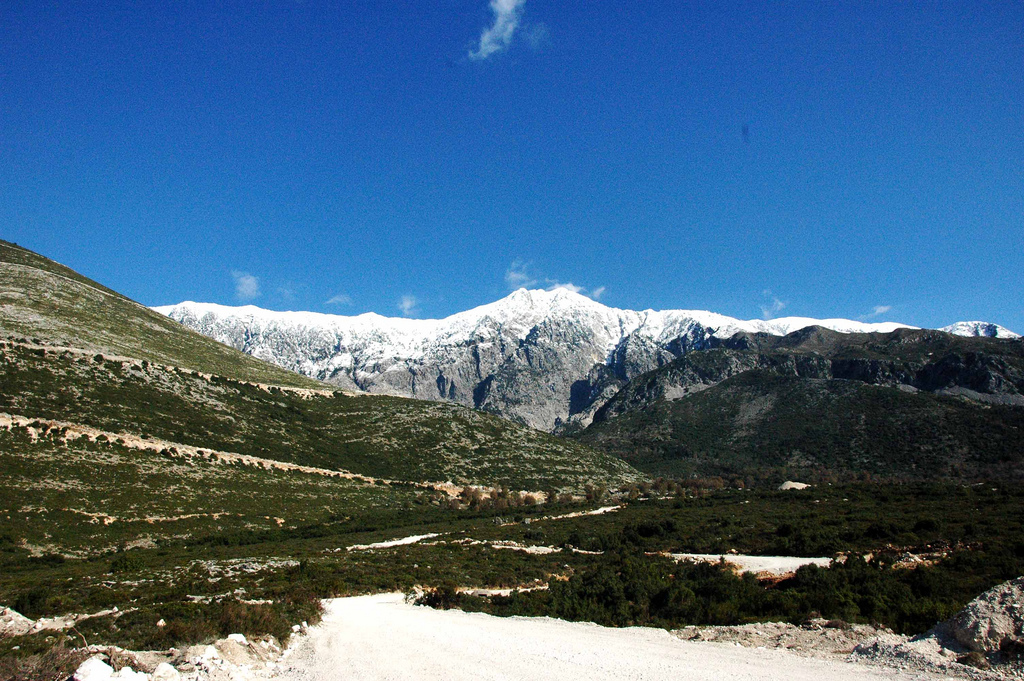
Maja e Çikës inside the Ceraunian Mountains as seen from the beach of Dhërmi.

In terms of geology, the major structural characteristic of the coastline is the presence of numerous carbonate anticlines for example in Karaburun and Sarandë. The core of these structures, which are mostly not visible at the surface, are constructed of Permian–Triassic evaporates, that were formed about 252 million years ago. The coastline is abundant in dolomites from the triassic period, the carbonate rocks follows with limestone from the jurassic period and bituminous schists, cretaceous porcelain and phosphate limestone.

The coastline is dominated by several long straight and rocky beaches, the most famous of which is the inaccurately named 5 kilometre long stretch of Borsh Beach in the Albanian Riviera's center. The slightly shorter Dhërmi and Himara Beaches lies further north. Nonetheless, the coastline is rugged and is dotted with bays and peninsulas such as Porto Palermo in the center. Sarandë is the largest city in the region and has wide beaches and a sheltered harbour.

The climate of the coastline is considerably influenced by the sea and mountains. Under the Köppen climate classification, the coastline experiences mostly a moderately hot and sunny mediterranean climate under influences of the continental climate. The mediterranean climate is typical of the coastal areas with considerable differences in temperature and rainfall between the seasons. The mountainous areas have a typical mountainous climate with frequent snow during winter.

=== Biodiversity ===
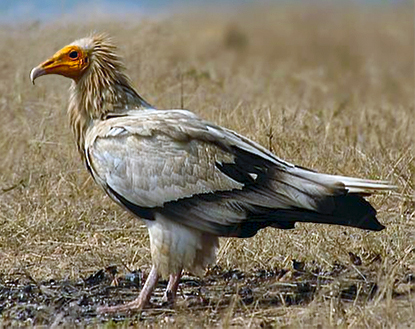
The egyptian vulture thrives in the traditional rural landscapes of the coastline.

The diversity, in terms of topography, geology, hydrology and climatic conditions, determined the broad variety of life in the region. The coastline features contrasting habitats and ecosystems impacted by various environmental factors, many of which are with conservation of national significance. In terms of phytogeography, the Albanian Ionian Sea Coast belongs to the illyrian province of the circumboreal region within the boreal kingdom. It falls completely within the illyrian deciduous forests terrestrial ecoregion of the Palearctic Mediterranean forests, woodlands, and scrub biome.

The vegetation is predominantly represented by evergreen and deciduous shrubs associated with the Mediterranean Sea. The woodlands, close to freshwater habitats, are represented by the alluvial, mixed and conifer forests but also coastal woods. The forests, at loftier elevations, contain various pine, oak, beech and fir species such as black pine, silver fir, ash trees and the mount tabor oak, which is exceptionally rare and classified as endangered. The seagrasses are dominated by posidonia oceanica, halophila stipulacea and cymodocea nodosa that are mostly to be found in the shallow waters which, however, can extend to more than 30 metres in the depth.

The fauna is incredibly rich and diverse, with many endemic, rare and threatened species. Because of their size and untouched landscapes, the inaccessible caves, scattered along the coastline, provide habitats for resting shelters for the critically endangered mediterranean monk seal. Karaburun and Butrint are frequently visited by the world's rarest pinniped. The forests are inhabited by the beech marten, red fox, wild boar, golden jackal, hare and eurasian otter, while the grey wolf is only present in winter.

Whales and dolphins are frequent guests in the offshore waters of the coastline, though the most common are cuvier's beaked whale, sperm whale, short-beaked common dolphin, striped dolphin, while the common bottlenose dolphin may be observed all around the coast of Albania. Three primary species of sea turtles have been discovered such as the loggerhead sea, green sea and leatherback sea turtle.

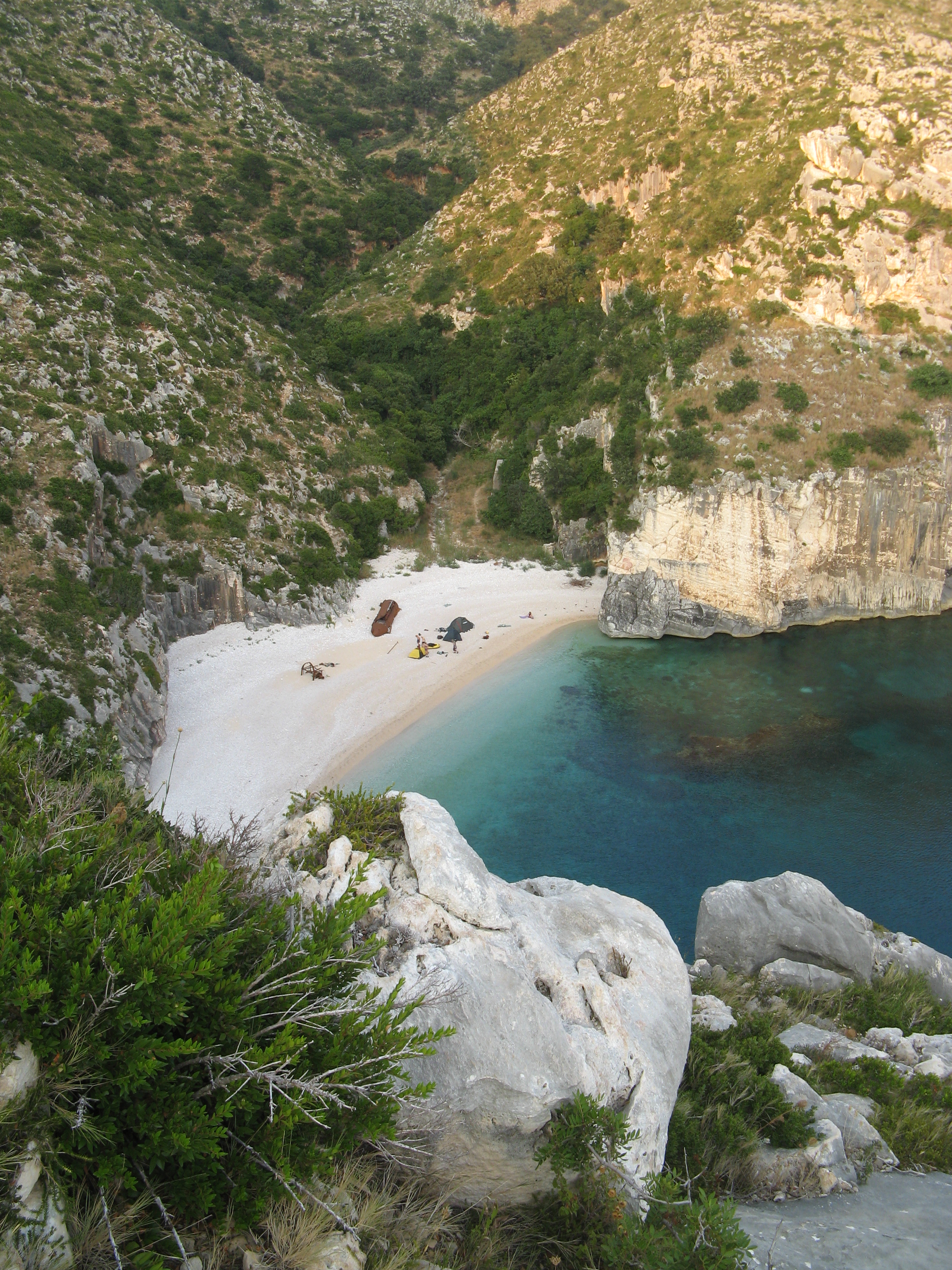
The bays along the coastline provide habitats for many important species, among them three types of endangered sea turtles.

Although not very large in size, the coastline is home to numerous species of birds that vary from nesting to breeding birds, and migrating to wintering birds. At the minimum 246 species of birds have been reported only in Butrint National Park. The rugged slopes and vertical sea cliffs provides excellent breeding conditions for the endangered egyptian vulture and golden eagle. The short-toed snake eagle is frequently to be found in open habitats with scattered trees, meadows, forest and rocky slopes.

Protected areas provide a vast array of social, environmental and economic benefits to people and communities worldwide, containing outstanding areas of biodiversity, essential and cultural significance. The region contains areas of great ecological importance and there are a number of designations of parks and protected areas in the coastline that reflect the great value and importance of the region.

The Karaburun-Sazan Marine Park is the most extensive national park in the region, encompassing the borderline of Karaburun Peninsula and Sazan Island in the north. Its terrain is dominated by a variety of landscape formations and most notable by the mountains of the peninsula which belongs to the Ceraunian Mountains. It is host to a diverse marine and terrestrial life attracting thousands of tourists all year around.

Butrint National Park is slightly smaller and is located in the extreme south of the country close to the border between Albania and Greece. The surroundings of Butrint are not only home to numerous globally threatened species, but offers also a rich cultural history. It comprises an extraordinary diversity of habitats, ecosystems and wildlife. Although Lake Butrint was further recognised as a wetland of international importance by designation under the Ramsar Convention.

The Llogara National Park is located in the Vlorë District and the third largest national park in the region. The park's natural environment is a vast one of exceptional beauty and unique biodiversity. Maja e Çikës, part of the Ceraunian Mountains, is located at the center of the park and is surrounded by dense forest which provide an exceptional view of nature and sea, bird watching, various peaks and animals. The park is covered with limestone and mountainous terrains providing various geological features.

== Economy ==
=== Tourism ===
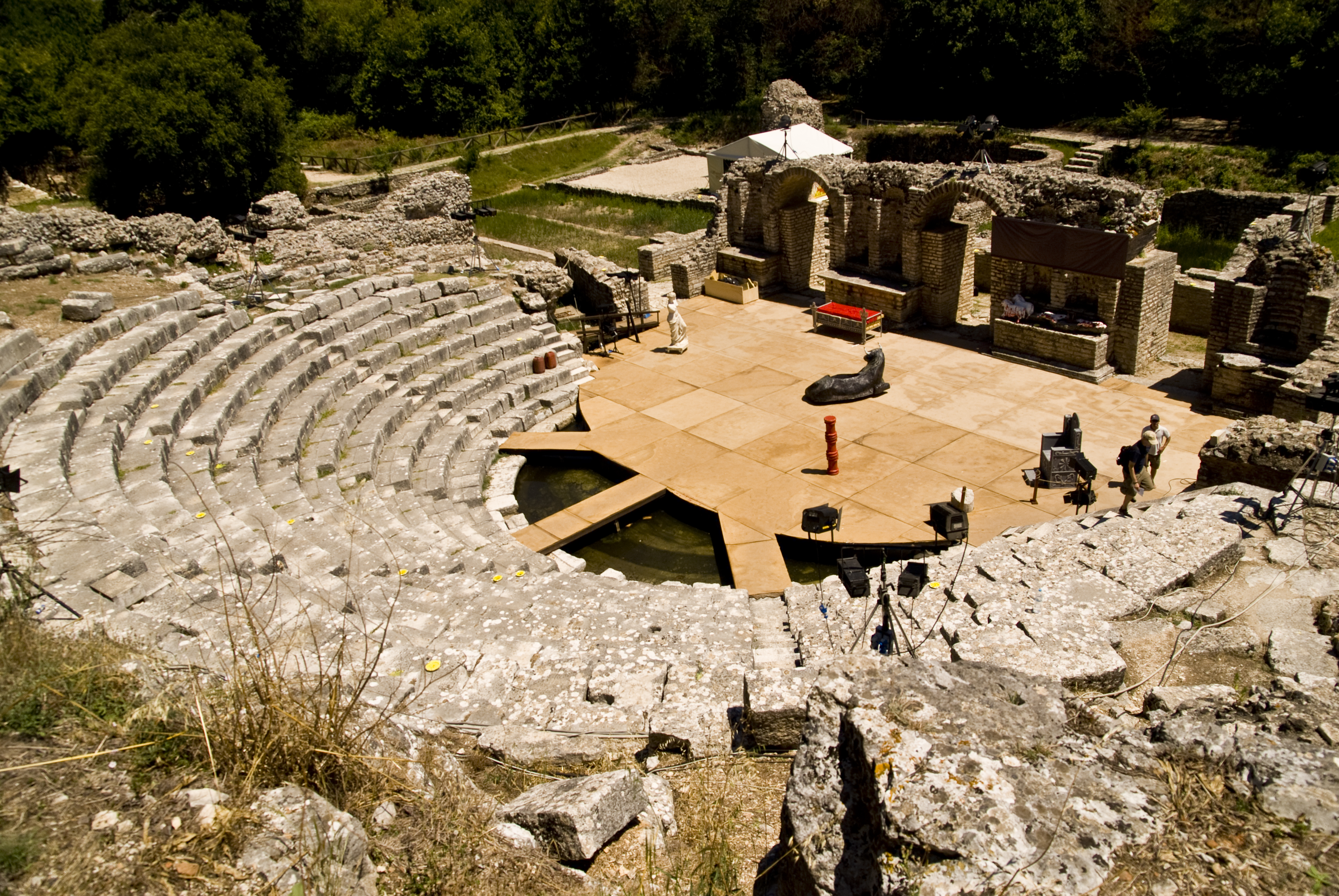
Butrint is one of the most important archaeological sites in Albania.

Tourism is considered one of the largest industries in the economy of Albania. It has significantly increased since the fall of communism in the country. The country has a rich historical and cultural heritage and natural beauty varying from clear turquoise waters fringed by sandy and rocky beaches to contrasting mountainous interior.

The Albanian Ionian Sea Coast has a broad cultural and architectural heritage, expressed in the region's churches, monasteries, mosques, citadels and castles found in the main cities and also in smaller villages scattered alongside the region. The warm climate, landscape scenery, local cuisine, vast history and the diverse architecture attract tourists from Albania and other countries.

The tourist season peaks in the summer months, although people visit the region all year round. The Albanian Riviera has been repeatedly recognized as the country's best and popular coast by several prestigious papers and organizations for its natural beauties. The Port of Sarandë is port for a wide variety of cruise lines offering trips to exciting destinations around the coast. The majority of cruise lines anchoring at the port includes ships from MSC, Holland America, P&O, Oceania, Regent Seven Seas and so on.

== See also ==
- Ionian Sea
- Geography of Albania
- Biodiversity of Albania
- Important Bird Areas in Albania
- Albanian Adriatic Sea Coast
