= Maja e Qorres =

Mountain in Albania

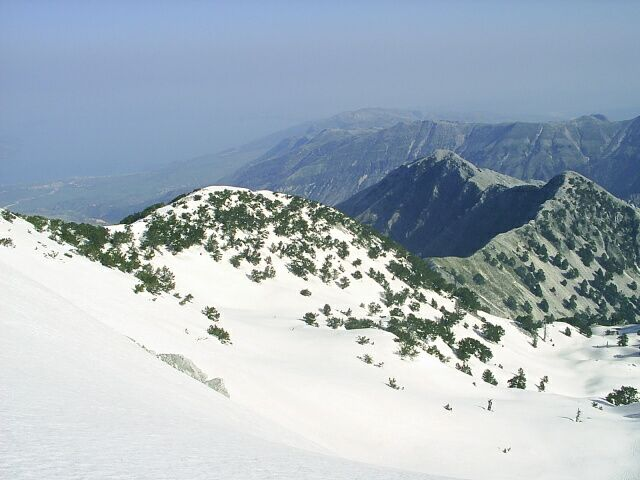

Highest point
- Elevation: 2,018 m (6,621 ft)
- Prominence: 231 m (758 ft)
- Isolation: 3.27 km (2.03 mi)
- Coordinates: 40°12′56″N 19°36′25″E

Naming
- English translation: Blind's Peak

Geography
- Location within Albania
- Country: Albania
- Region: Southern Mountain Region
- Municipality: Himarë
- Parent range: Ceraunian Mountains

Geology
- Rock age: Mesozoic
- Mountain type: summit
- Rock type(s): limestone, dolomite

Maja e Qorres (lit. 'Blind's Peak') is a summit in southwestern Albania, part of the Ceraunian Mountains range, along the Ionian coast. Rising to an elevation of 2,018 m (6,621 ft) above sea level, it is the second-highest point of the Çikë massif.

== Geography ==
Maja e Qorres constitutes one of the summits of the Çikë mountain mass, extending from the valley of Shushicë river in the north, toward Dukat and Llogara Pass in the south.

Situated near the high ridge crest overlooking Llogara, it dominates the skyline above the coastal villages of Palasë, Dhërmi and Vuno.

== Geology ==
The summit is composed predominantly of Mesozoic carbonate rocks, particularly limestone and dolomite, characteristic of the Ionian tectonic zone.

Its relief represents a large anticline, shaped by complex tectonic folding and faulting, which has been further dissected by erosional processes, including frost weathering and karstification.

As in much of the massif, surface water is scarce due to the permeable nature of the carbonate formations.

The upper slopes are largely barren and treeless, while lower elevations support Mediterranean and subalpine vegetation, such as shrublands and seasonal pastures.

== Climbing route ==
The trail begins at Llogara Pass, following the path through a dense pine forest. One route continues straight along the ridge, climbing directly to the summit. An alternative option is to turn right and follow a traversing ascent that gradually leads to Qorre Pass (1,850 m). From there, the final ascent consists of a short but steady climb of less than 200 meters.

The hike covers a distance of approximately 8.9 kilometers, with a total elevation gain of 1,015 meters and typically requires about three hours to complete.

== See also ==
- List of mountains in Albania
