= Geography of Albania =

- Continent: Europe
- Region: Mediterranean Sea; Southeastern Europe
- Area
  - Total: 28,748 km^{2} (11,100 sq mi)
  - Land: 97.7%
  - Water: 2.3%
- Coastline: 476 km (296 mi)
- Borders: Greece 212 km (132 mi); Montenegro 186 km (116 mi); North Macedonia 181 km (112 mi); Kosovo 112 km (70 mi)
- Highest point: Mount Korab; 2,764 m (9,068 ft)
- Lowest point: Adriatic Sea; 0 m (0 ft)
- Longest river: River of Drin; 335 km (208 mi)
- Largest lake: Lake of Shkodër; 530 km^{2} (200 sq mi)

Albania is a country in southeastern Europe that lies along the Adriatic and Ionian Seas, with a coastline spanning approximately 476 km (296 mi). Situated on the Balkan Peninsula, it is one of the most mountainous countries in Europe. It is bounded by Montenegro to the northwest, Kosovo to the northeast, North Macedonia to the east and Greece to the southeast and south.

Most of Albania rises into mountains and hills, tending to run the length of the country from north to south, as for instance the Albanian Alps in the north, the Sharr Mountains in the northeast, the Skanderbeg Mountains in the center, the Korab Mountains in the east, the Pindus Mountains in the southeast, and the Ceraunian Mountains in the southwest. Plains and plateaus extend in the west along the Albanian Adriatic and Ionian Sea Coast.

Some of the most considerable and oldest bodies of freshwater of Europe can be found in Albania. The second largest lake of Southern Europe, the Lake of Shkodër, is located in the northwest surrounded by the Albanian Alps and the Adriatic Sea. And one of the oldest continuously existing lakes in the world, the Lake of Ohrid, lies in the southeast, while the highest tectonic lakes of the Balkan Peninsula, the Large and Small Lake of Prespa, are well hidden among high mountains in the southeast.

Rivers originate in the east of Albania and loop towards the west into the sea. They are encompassed by the drainage basins of the Adriatic, Aegean and Black Sea. The longest river in the country, measured from its mouth to its source, is the Drin that starts at the confluence of its two headwaters, the Black and White Drin, though also notable is the Vjosë, one of the last intact large river systems in Europe.

For a small country, Albania is characterized for its biological diversity and abundance of contrasting ecosystems and habitats, defined in an area of 28,748 square kilometres (11,100 sq mi). This great diversity derives from Albania's geographic location on the Mediterranean Sea, with typical climatic conditions, varied topography, as well as the wealth of terrestrial and marine ecosystems providing a variety of habitats, each with its own typical flora and fauna.

There are 799 Albanian protected areas covering a surface of 5,216.96 square kilometres (2,014.28 sq mi). These include two strict nature reserves, 12 national parks, one marine park, eight archaeological parks, 750 natural monuments, 22 habitat/species management areas, five protected landscapes, four protected landscapes, four managed resources areas, and four ramsar wetlands. The national parks cover a surface area of 210,668.48 hectares (2,106.6848 km^{2}) or roughly 13.65% of the overall territory.

== Borders ==
A total surface area of 28.748 square kilometres (11,100 sq mi), the country is located in the southeastern part of the Adriatic and the northeastern part of the Ionian Sea, both located within the Mediterranean Sea. It has a length of borders of about 1,094 kilometres (680 mi), 657 kilometres (408 mi) of which are taken by terrestrial borders, 316 kilometres (196 mi) of shore borders, 48 kilometres (30 mi) river borders and 73 kilometres (45 mi) of lake borders. Inland water surface is 1,350 square kilometres (520 sq mi), composed by natural lakes 325 square kilometres (125 sq mi), coastal lagoons 130 square kilometres (50 sq mi), artificial lakes 174 square kilometres (67 sq mi) and rivers 721 kilometres (448 mi).

The countries of Montenegro (173 kilometres (107 mi)) and the disputed territory of Kosovo (114 kilometres (71 mi)) border the country in the north and northeast, respectively, though Serbia claims the border but has not exercised its jurisdiction since 1999. A significant portion of this border connects high points and follows mountain ridges through the largely inaccessible Albanian Alps. The eastern border is shared with North Macedonia, which stretches 151 kilometres (94 mi). This border is located at the tripoint between Albania, Kosovo, and North Macedonia passing through the Sharr and Korab Mountains and continues until it reaches Lake Ohrid and Lake Prespa. The southern and southeastern border with Greece is 282 kilometres (175 mi) long. The border is located at the tripoint border between Albania, North Macedonia, and Greece running across the Large and Small Lake Prespa until it reaches the Ionian Sea at the Strait of Corfu.

== Physical geography ==
=== Topography ===
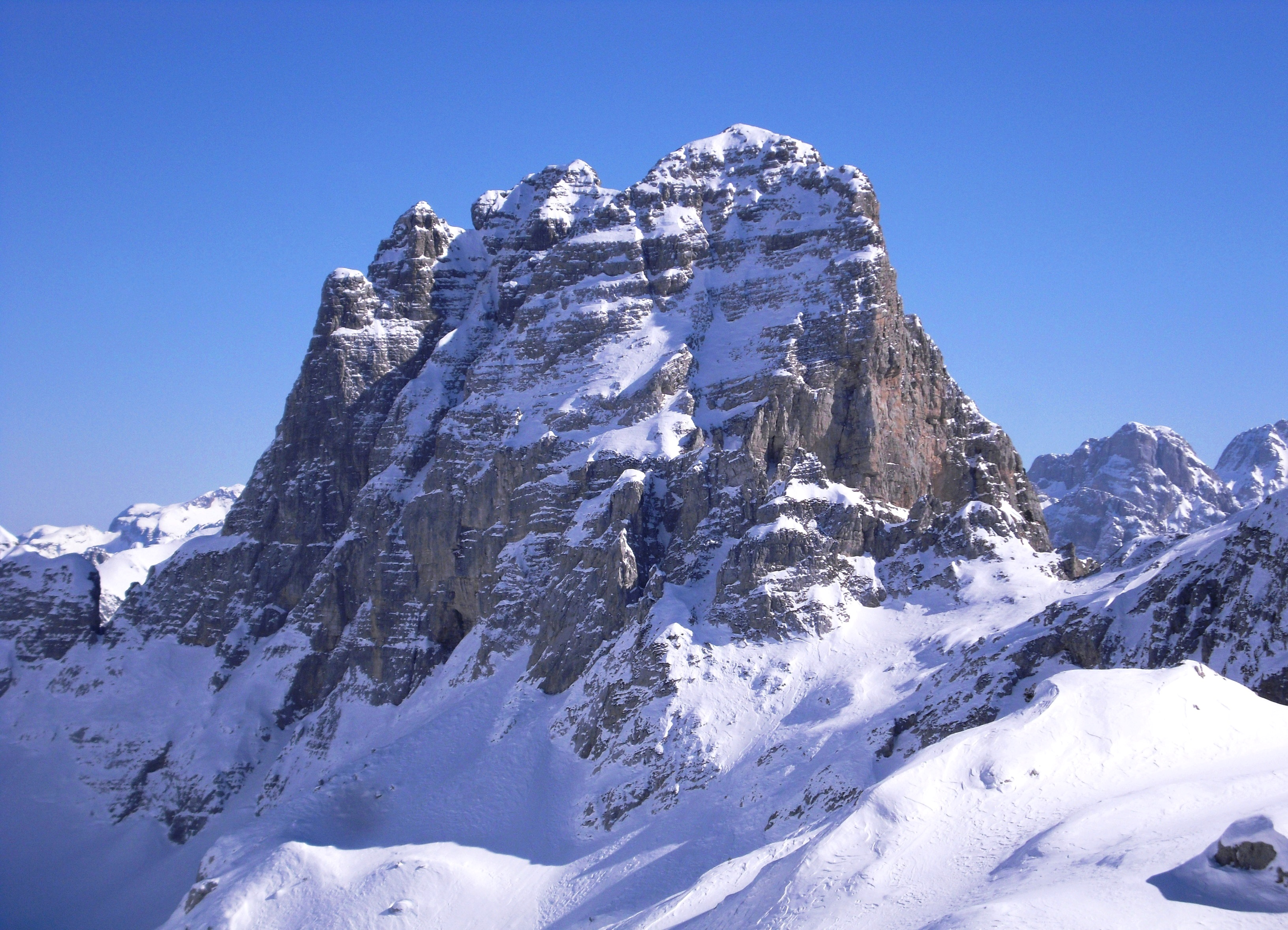
Maja e Thatë within the Albanian Alps in the north

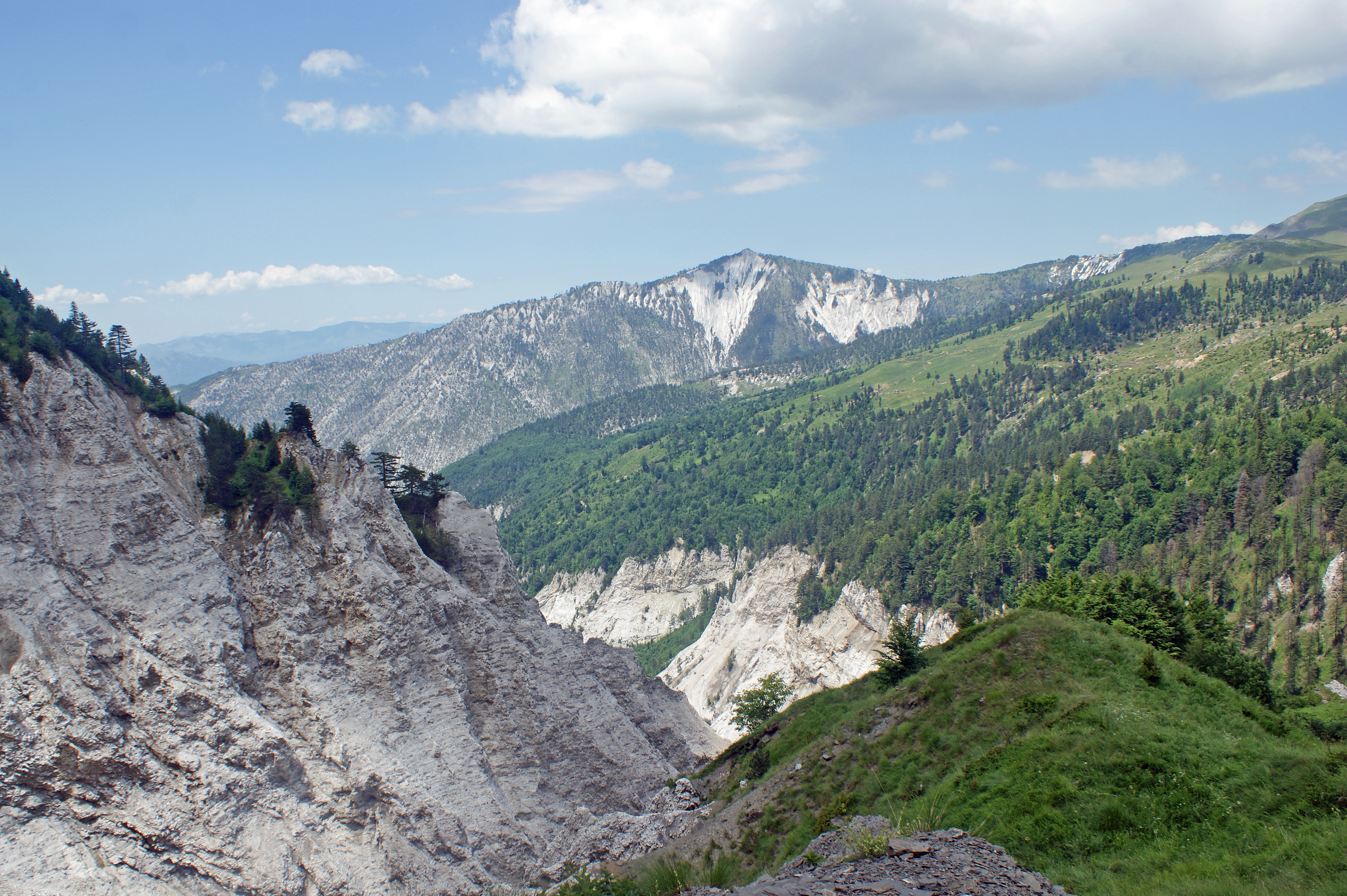
Mali i Bardhë within the Korab Mountains in the east

The most significant feature of Albania is possibly its relief, with numerous successive mountain ranges and its average altitude, more than 700 metres above sea level. Much of the mountains lie to the north, east and south of the western lowlands in the northern, eastern and southern mountain ranges.

The Albanian Alps extend over 90 kilometres through the north of Albania, traversing an area of 2,000 square kilometres. These mountains represent an extension of the Dinaric Alps and no wider than 40 kilometres. They are deeply fragmented and often inaccessible. It holds the Maja Jezercë, which is the highest point of the Dinarides and simultaneously the second highest point of Albania.

The Korab Mountains dominate the east of the country and expand 40 kilometres along the eastern border of the country, where peaks can clearly reach 2,500 metres. The mountains offer the country's most prominent peak at Mount Korab, which is fragmented by many deep structural depressions. Another distinguishing feature remains the evidence of the last ice age in form of glacial lakes at relatively low altitudes.

One of the most remarkable features about the south of Albania is the presence of the Ceraunian Mountains that cut across the landscape for nearly 100 kilometres. Thousand meter high mountains fall vertically into the Mediterranean Sea constituting at least the first barrier to communication between the sea and the country's southern inland.

=== Hydrography ===
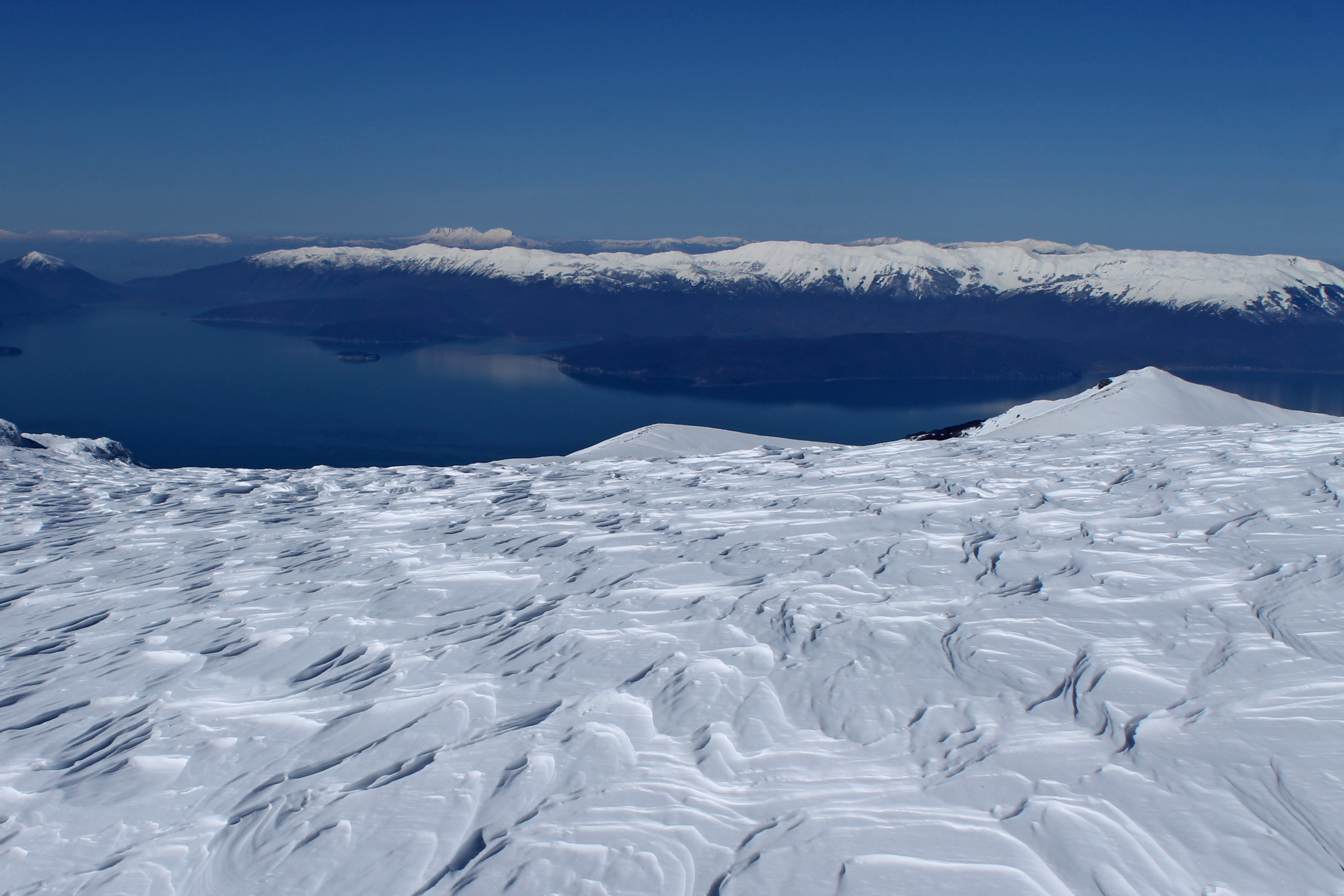
Lake of Prespa in the southeast

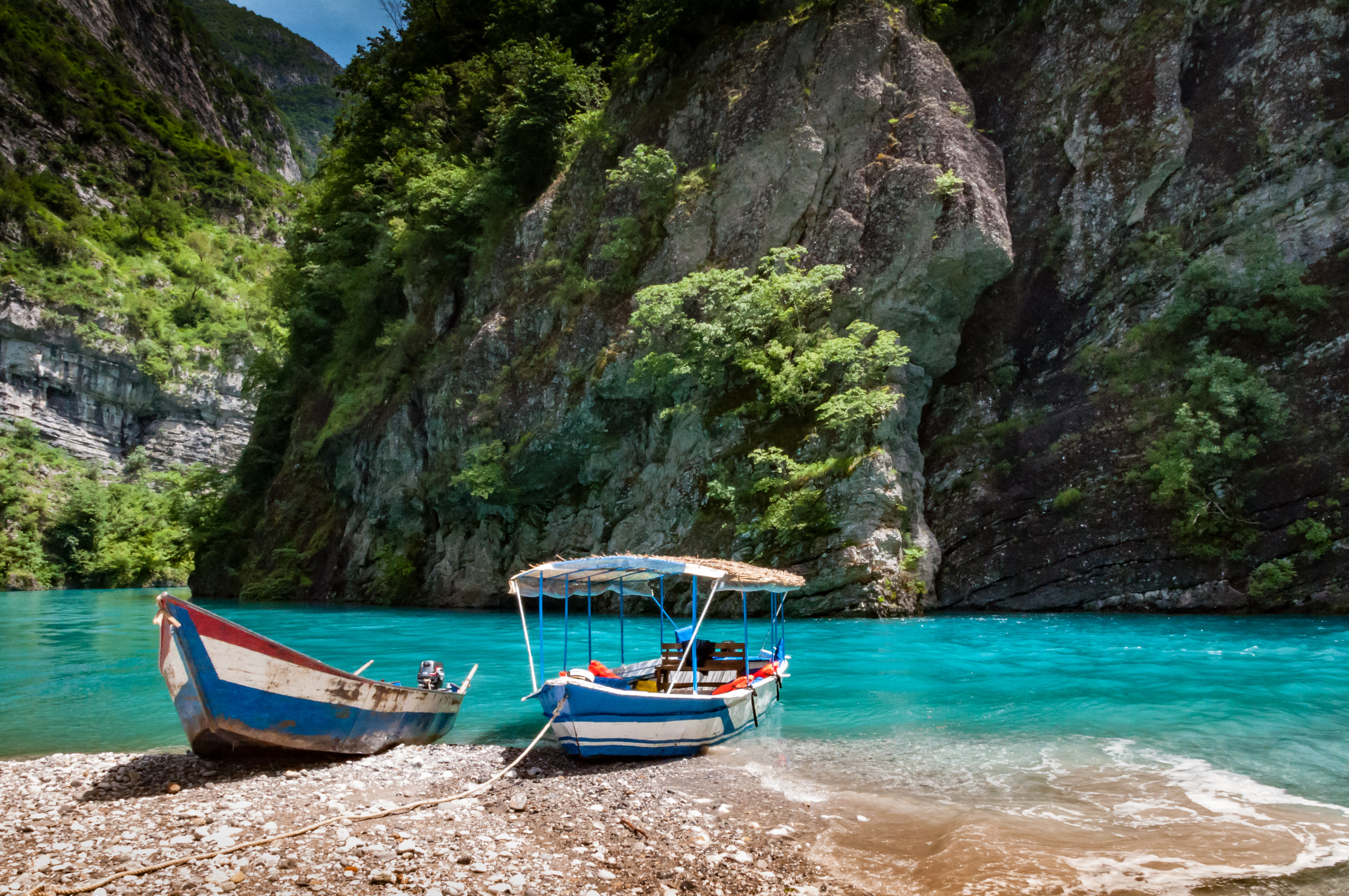
Lake of Koman in the northeast

The country has a dense network of rivers and streams characterized by a high flow rate. They belong to the drainage basins of the Adriatic, Aegean and Black Sea. They mostly rise in the mountainous eastern half of the country and have their mouths in the west along the coasts. They are sustained from snowmelt of the snow-capped mountains or from the abundant precipitation that falls at loftier elevations.

Eight notable rivers, along with their numerous tributaries, make up the river system of the country. The longest river is the Drin, which flows for 285 kilometres (177 mi) within the country. Its catchment area is one of the most biodiverse places in Europe and encompasses the lakes of Shkodër, Ohrid and Prespa. Of particular concern represent the river of Vjosa as it is considered as the last remaining wild river in Europe. The country's other rivers are Fan, Ishëm, Erzen, Mat, Seman and Shkumbin.

With more than 250 lakes, the country is home to two of the largest lakes in Southern Europe and one of the oldest in the World. The lakes of the country are predominantly of karstic or glacial origin. The largest lake in Southern Europe is the Lake of Shkodër geographically located in the north, shared with Montenegro. One of the most ancient lakes in the world is the Lake of Ohrid located in the southeast, shared with North Macedonia. The highest positioned lakes in Southern Europe are the Large and Small Lake of Prespa in the southeast, shared with North Macedonia and Greece.

The country is also home to many lagoons of varied shape, size and structure. They are primarily positioned along the coast in the west of the country and also in the southeast. They contribute to the overall productivity of the coastal waters by supporting a variety of habitats and ecosystems. The largest lagoon in the country is the Lagoon of Karavasta located between the mouth of Shkumbin and Seman. Another significant lagoons are the lagoons of Patoku, Narta, Kunë-Vain and Butrint.

== Biodiversity ==
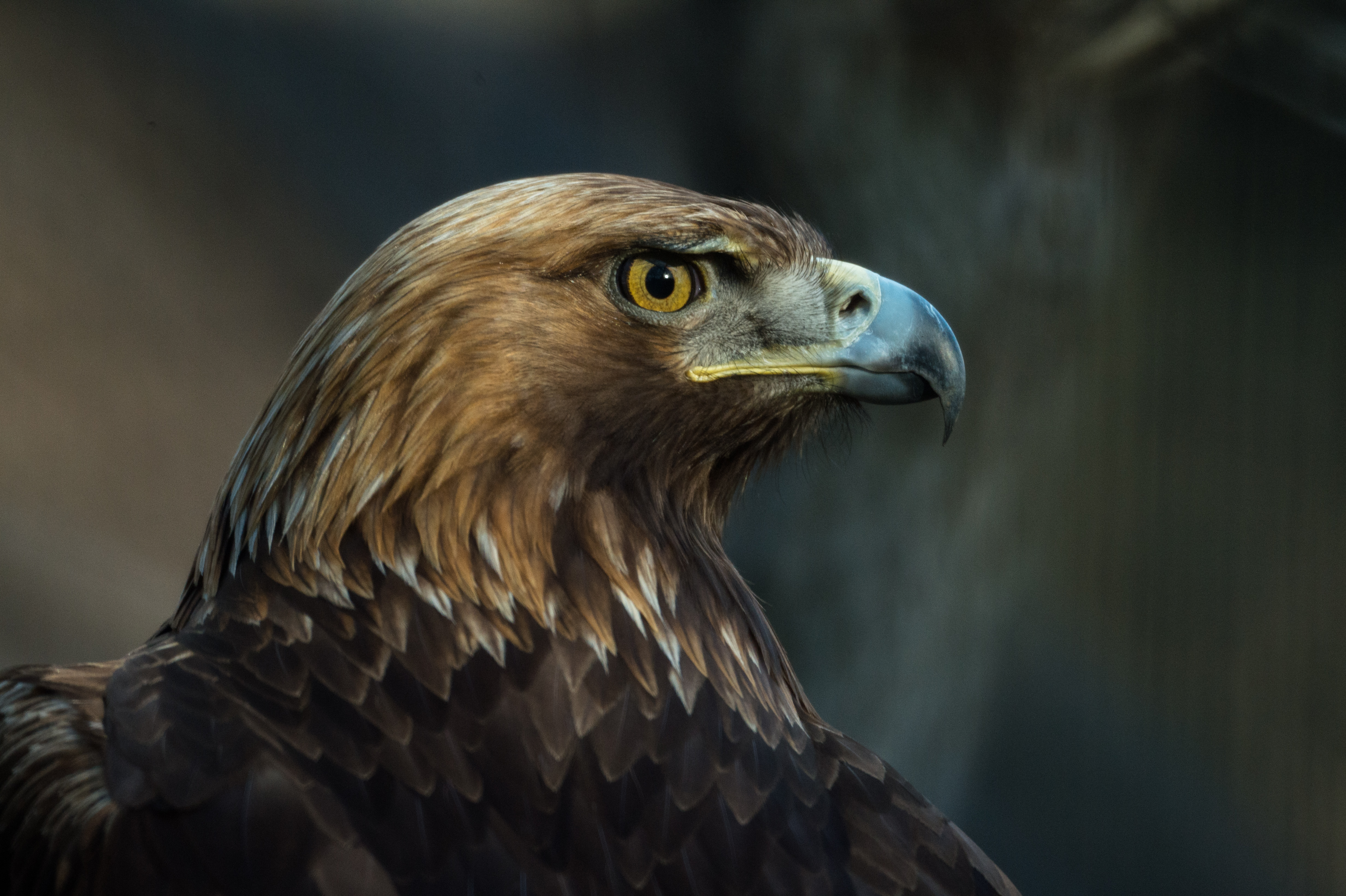
The golden eagle is the national symbol of Albania.

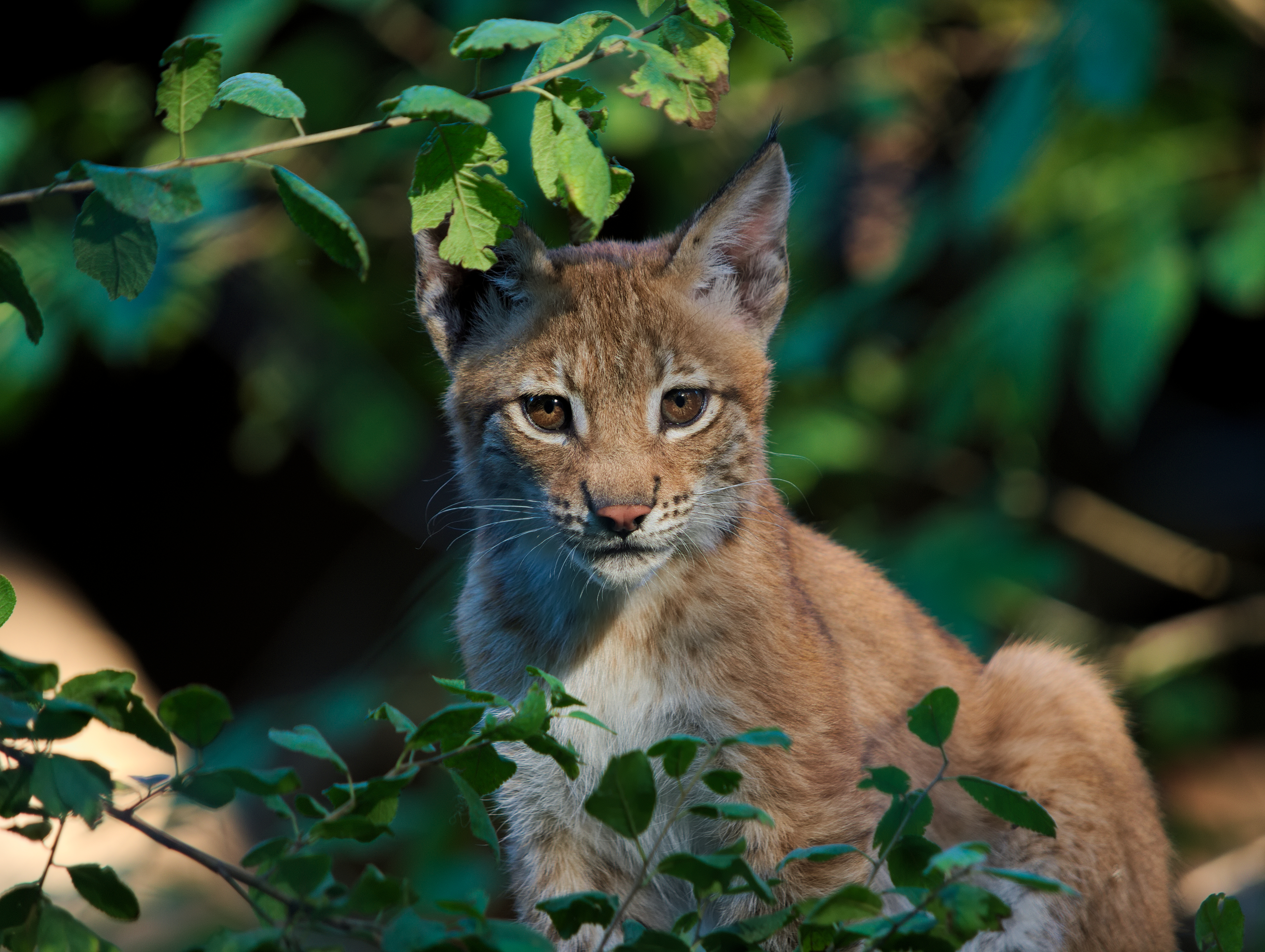
The Balkan lynx lives only in Albania and Macedonia.

The proximity to the Mediterranean Sea and the convergence of exceptional climatic, geological and hydrological conditions, have contributed for the development of a diverse biodiversity, making Albania one of the biodiversity hotspots of Europe.

In terms of phytogeography, the land area of Albania extends within the Boreal Kingdom, specifically within the Illyrian province of the Circumboreal Region. Its territory can be subdivided into four terrestrial ecoregions of the Palearctic realm – the Illyrian, Balkan, Pindus and Dinaric forests.

In Albania forest cover is around 29.% of the total land area, equivalent to 788,900 hectares (ha) of forest in 2020, up from 788,800 hectares (ha) in 1990. Of the naturally regenerating forest 11% was reported to be primary forest (consisting of native tree species with no clearly visible indications of human activity) and around 0% of the forest area was found within protected areas. For the year 2015, 97% of the forest area was reported to be under public ownership, 3% private ownership and 0% with ownership listed as other or unknown.

The northern edge of the country has an affinity for those of Continental Europe, while those of the southern edge refer to the affinity with that of the Mediterranean Basin. They are substantial because they provide shelter for a vast array of rare and endangered species of animals, among others the brown bear, Balkan lynx, grey wolf, golden jackal, Egyptian vulture and golden eagle. Albania had a 2018 Forest Landscape Integrity Index mean score of 6.77/10, ranking it 64th globally out of 172 countries.

The Mediterranean monk seal, short-beaked common dolphin and common bottlenose dolphin can frequently be seen in the coastal waters of the country. Outstanding is the presence of the Dalmatian pelican, the rarest pelican in the world. The biodiversity of Albania is conserved in its protected areas, which provide protection to hundreds of threatened and endangered species.

=== Protected areas ===
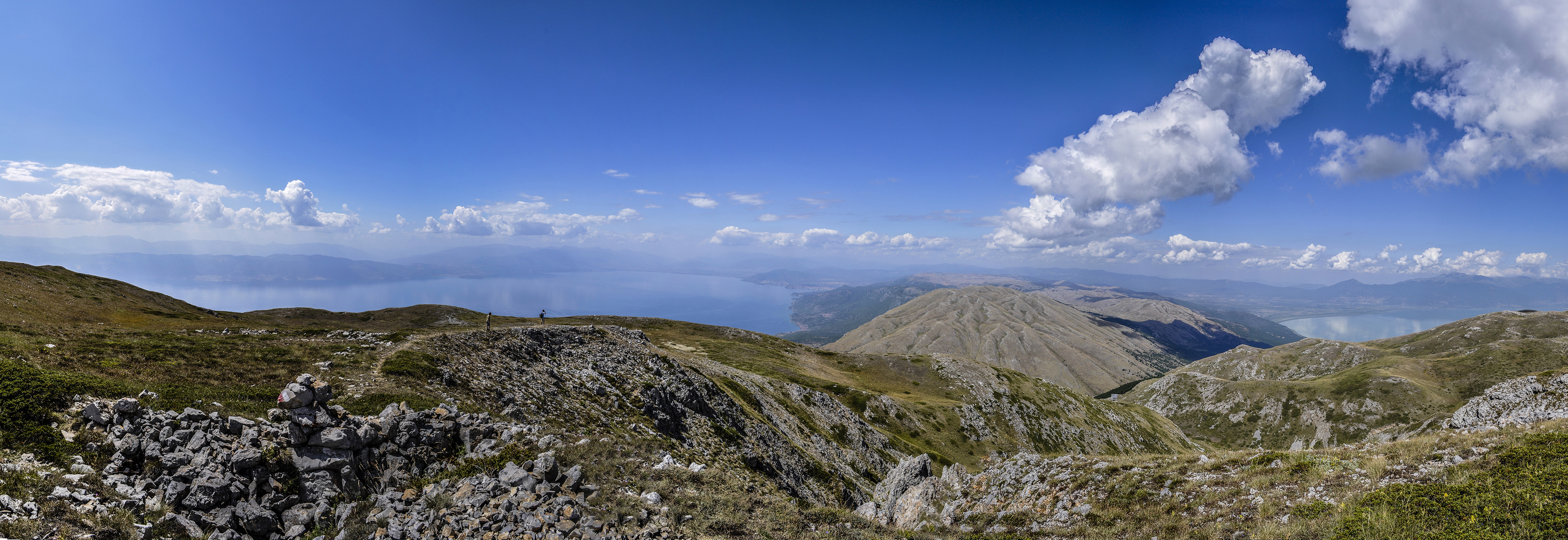
The Ohrid-Prespa Biosphere Reserve in southeastern Albania and southwestern North Macedonia

Numerous parts of Albania are protected in accordance with a number of national and international designations due to their natural, historical or cultural value. Protected areas belong to the most principal instruments of conservation which in turn contributes effectively to the maintenance of species, habitats and ecosystems.

The country has currently twelve designated national parks, whereby one is specified as a marine park. Ranging from the Adriatic Sea and the Ionian Sea to the Albanian Alps and the Ceraunian Mountains, they possess landscapes constituting habitats to thousands of plant and animal species. Butrint, Divjakë-Karavasta, Karaburun-Sazan, Llogara, Prespa, Shebenik-Jabllanicë, and Alps of Albania are among the most popular national parks of the country.

== Climate ==
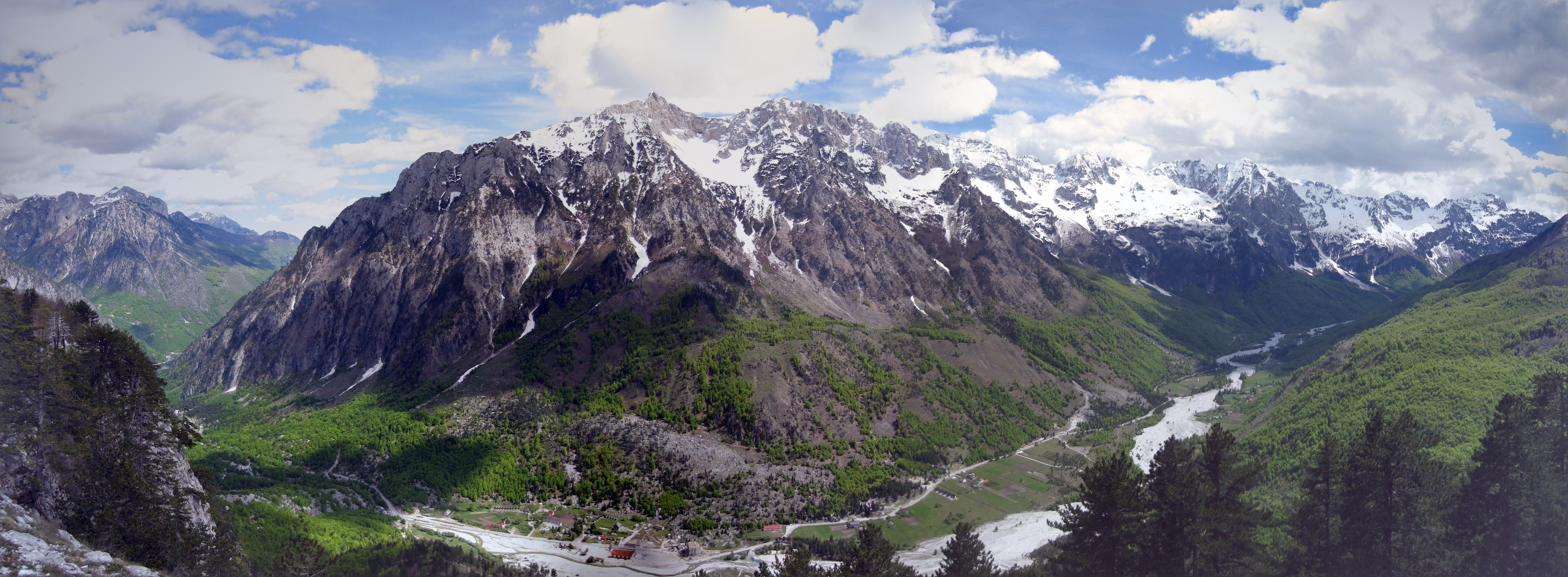
The Valley of Valbonë within the Albanian Alps during autumn

Albania has a combination of a mediterranean climate and a continental climate, with four distinct seasons. The climatic conditions are highly variable and modified locally by altitude and latitude. Its climate is strongly influenced by the Mediterranean Sea in the west, and the mountains that raise in every corner around the country.

Its diverse regions have a remarkable range of microclimates, with the weather system on the coasts contrasting with that prevailing in the interior. Moreover, the weather varies from the north and towards the south and the west to the east. Albania occupies the climate ranges from temperate climate on the coasts to continental climate in the interior. The warmest areas of the country are at the coasts, which are characterized by a Mediterranean climate (Csa, Csb and Cfa) as defined by the Köppen climate classification. The highlands experiences an Oceanic climate. Winters in Albania are characteristically mild and wet while summers are warm and dry. The northern areas of country such as the Albanian Alps experiences a subarctic climate with frequently very cold winters, and short, mild summers.

The lowlands of Albania have mild winters, averaging about 7 °C (45 °F). The summer temperatures average 32 °C (90 °F), however, humidity is low. In the southern lowlands, specifically the areas on the Ionian sea, temperatures average about 5 °C (41 °F) in the winter and 30 °C (86 °F) during the summer.

== Physiographic regions ==
The country is divided into four physiographic regions, the Northern Mountain Range, Central Mountain Range, Southern Mountain Range and Western Lowlands with two subdivisions corresponding roughly to the Albanian Adriatic and Ionian Sea Coast.

=== Western Lowlands ===
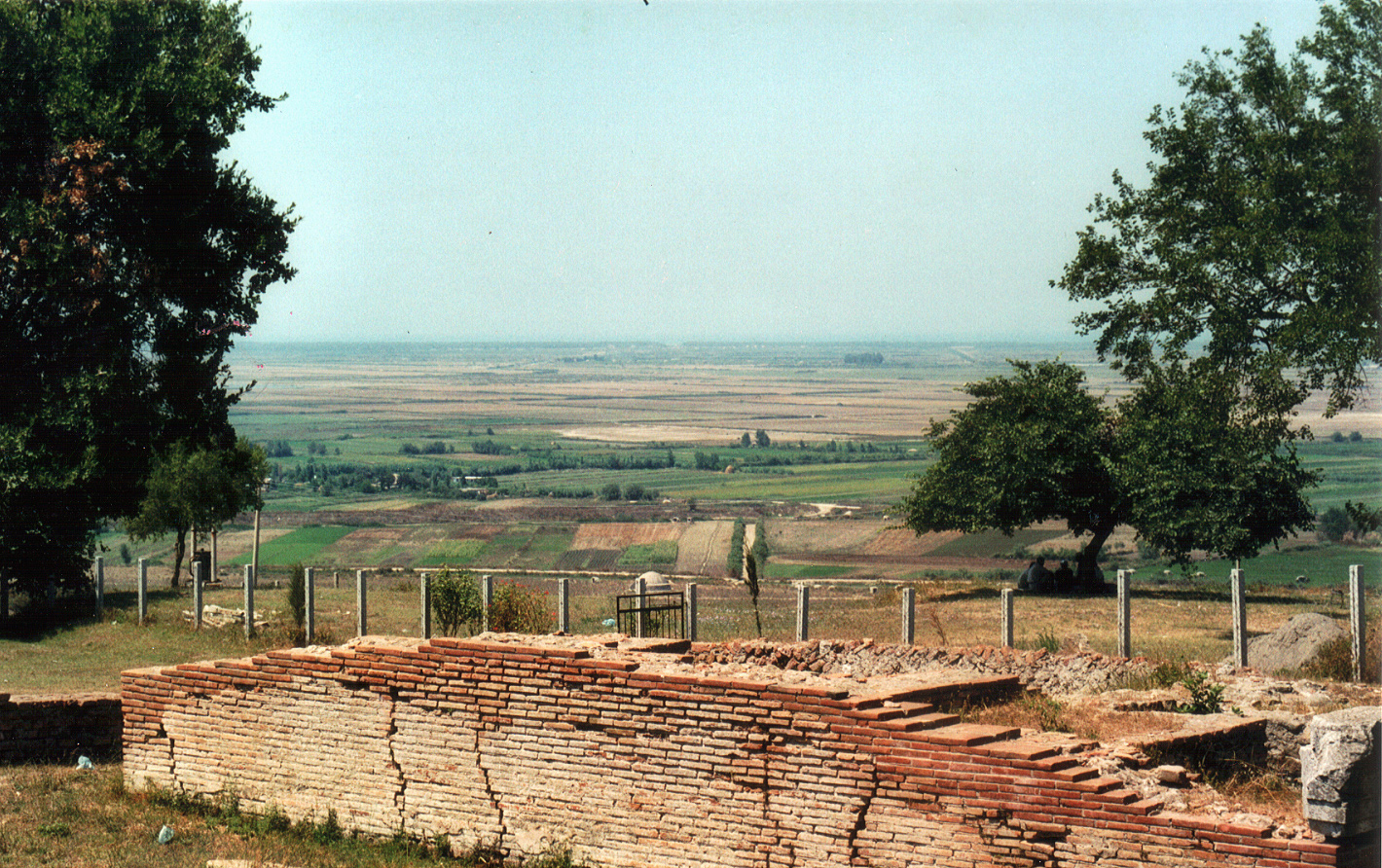
The Myzeqe plain, seen from the ancient city of Apollonia

Except for its sea coast in the west, the western lowlands are ringed by a great arc-shaped line of mountains spreading in the north, east and south. The predominantly flat and regular landscape is morphologically characterized by the sea and rivers, in terms of topography and soil, and also in its climate and biodiversity. The region experiences mild and short winters, with low rainfalls, and long hot and dry summers. It is mostly dominated by the extensive Myzeqe plain, a large alluvial plain traversed by three main rivers, the Shkumbin, Seman and Vjosë.

The Albanian Adriatic Sea Coast stretches from the mouth of the river Buna near the Lake of Shkodër in the north, across the Gulf of Drin, to the Bay of Vlorë in the south. The two largest coastal cities Durrës and Vlorë are located in the northern and the southern part of the region, respectively. The total length of the coastline is approximately 274 kilometres (170 mi), mostly of which are taken up by sandy beaches, wetlands and alluvial deposits, occurred by quaternary sediments of the main rivers of the country.

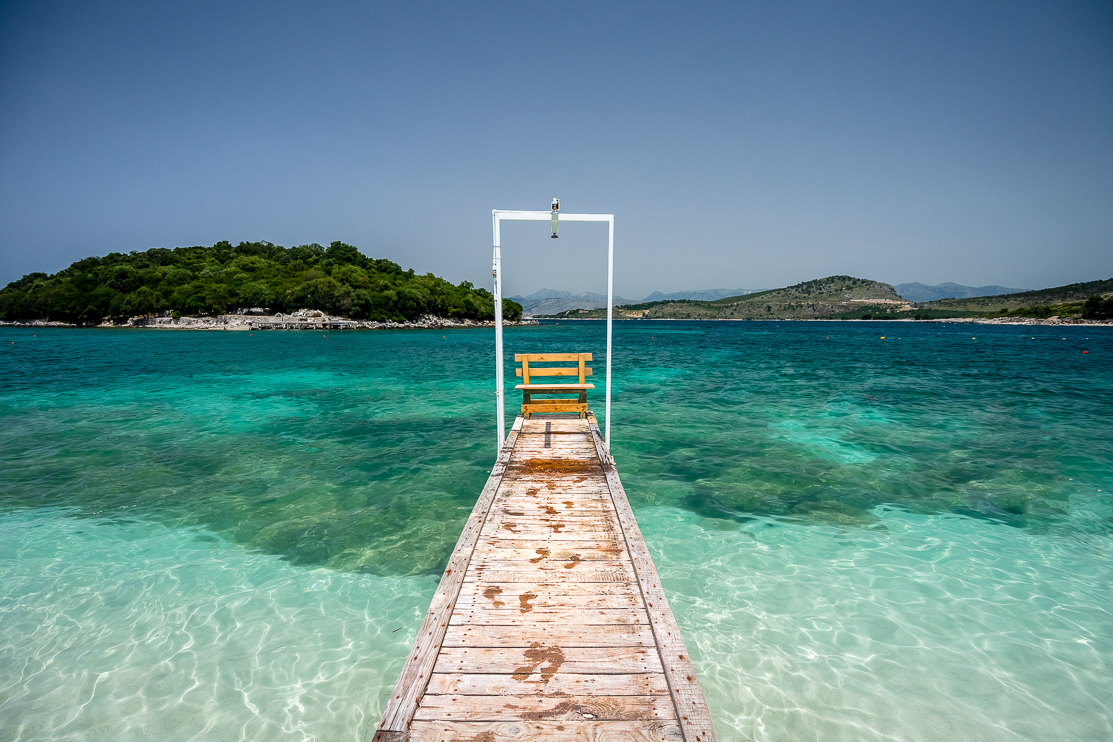
The waters of Ksamil in the extreme south of the Albanian Ionian Sea Coast

The coastline is lined with different habitats and ecosystems, providing optimal conditions for a rich biodiversity. Of particular importance is the presence of numerous lagoons and ponds, representing one of the wealthiest scenery of the country, in terms of biology. Likely, the lagoons of Karavasta and Narta, in the immediate proximity to the sea, are among the most important ones in the Mediterranean Sea.

While the Adriatic coast is relatively low, the Ionian coast is, with few exceptions, rugged and mountainous. The Albanian Ionian Sea Coast stretches from the Peninsula of Karaburun in the north, through the Albanian Riviera, to the Straits of Corfu in the south. The largest coastal city Sarandë is located in the southern part of the region, while smaller villages include Borsh, Dhermi, Himara, Qeparo, Piqeras, and Lukovë. The total length of the coastline is approximately 172 kilometres (107 mi).

The most characteristic features of the coastline are the Ceraunian Mountains, which extend nearly 100 kilometres (62 mi) along the Albanian Riviera roughly in a southeast–northwest direction. The region is particular fertile and known for its citrus fruits and viticulture, that has a long and special tradition in the region. The coastline is abundant in dolomite from the triassic period, the carbonate rocks follows with limestone from the jurassic period and bituminous schists, cretaceous porcelain and phosphate limestone.

=== Northern Mountain Range ===
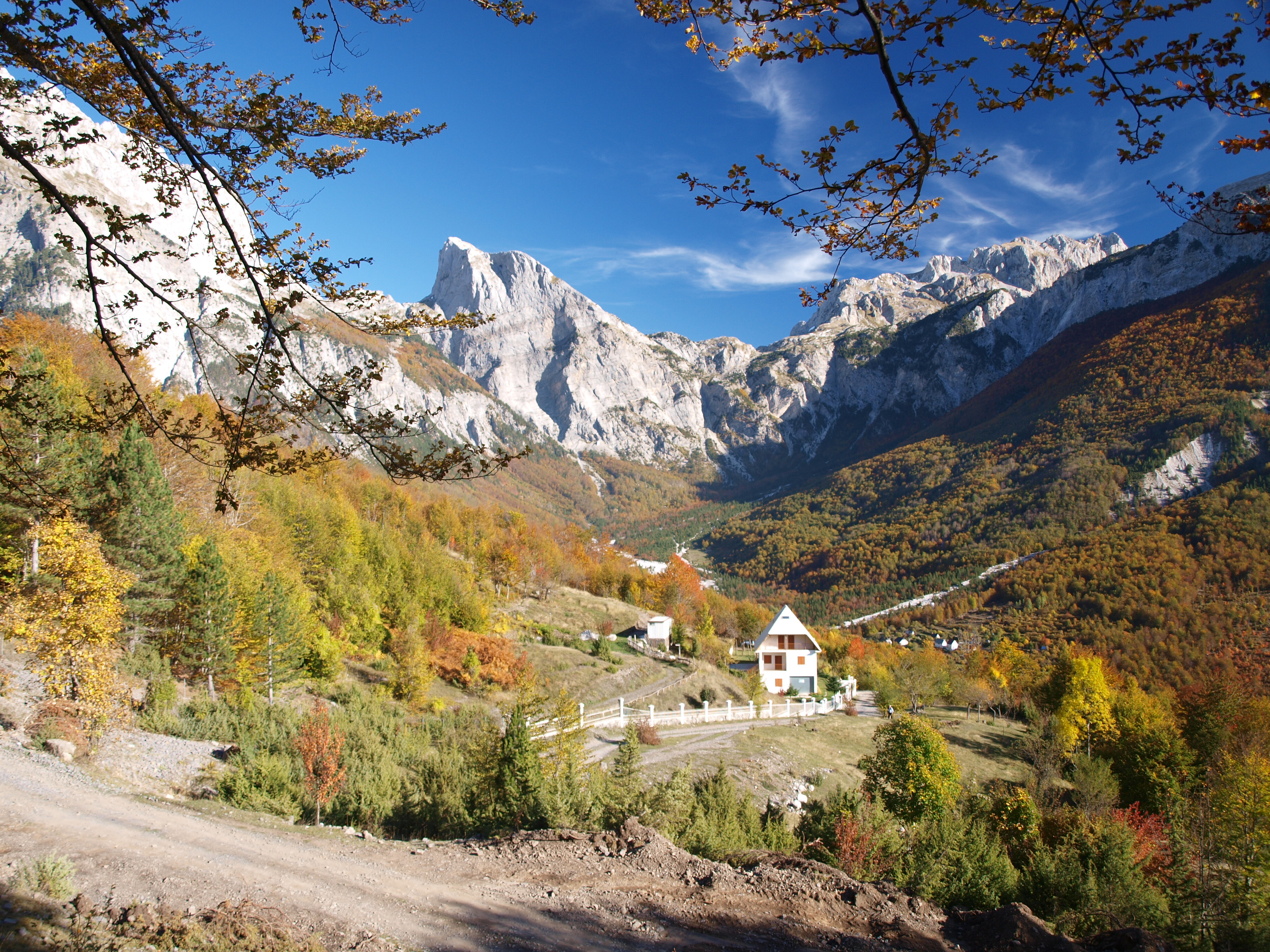
The valley of Shala, seen from the village of Theth

The northern mountain range is the most mountainous region in the country and its physical geography and shape is distinguished by the convergence of two distinct geological regions, the Albanian Alps and Mirdita Highlands. A dominant feature of the region's landscape is the presence of several u-shaped valleys, such as the Valley of Valbonë, formed by the process of glaciation.

The Albanian Alps are the southernmost extension of the Dinaric Alps and simultaneously the highest and most imposing mountains of the country. Despite the fact that the ice ages had relatively little geological influence on the alps, the southernmost glaciers of Europe were recently discovered on the alps.

The Albanian Alps are home to many important rivers of Western Balkans. The main drainage basins of the Alps are those of the Drin and Danube Rivers. Rivers on the Alps fall roughly into two categories, those that flow into the Lim and those that enter the White Drin and meet the Black Drin downstream at the Drin confluence. However, Drin dominates, draining most of the Alps with its tributaries and when measured from the source of the White Drin to the mouth of the Drin near Lezhë. But not all of the Drin flows near or parallel to the Alps. One Drin tributary is the Valbona River, which drains into the Adriatic Sea, and its eastern tributary the Gashi River.

=== Central Mountain Range ===
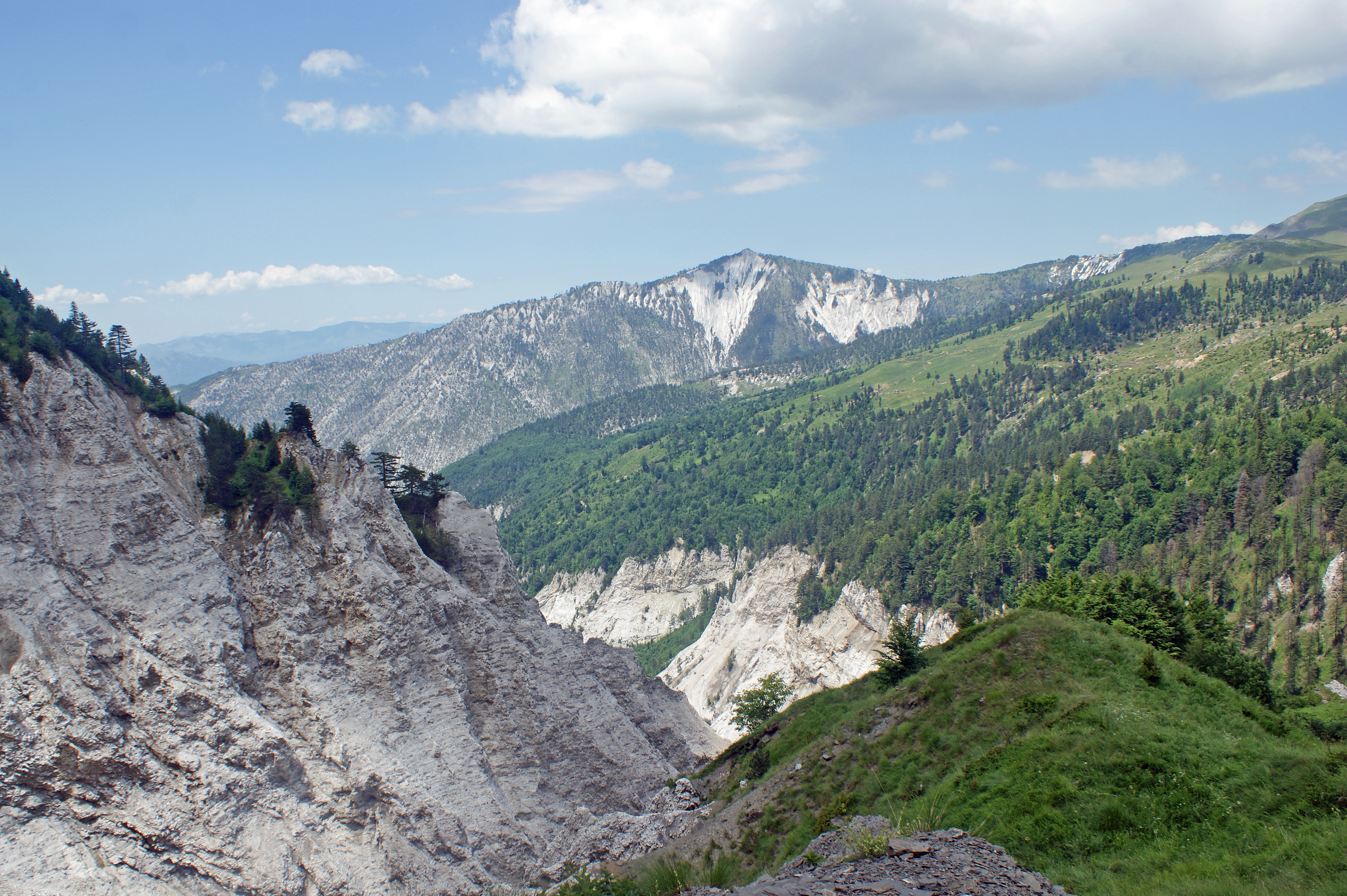
A typical landscape within the Mali i Bardhë

The terrain of the central mountain range is predominantly mountainous and extremely fragmented carved into its present shape by the glaciers of the last ice age. The region is dominated by three mountain ranges, each running from north-northeast to south-southwest, roughly parallel to the eastern border of Albania.

The Korab Mountains are certainly the most striking feature of the physical geography of the region. They hold the highest mountain of the country, the Mount Korab. The mountains extends over 40 kilometres and covers an area of 560 square kilometres. Between the valleys of Shkumbin and Devoll rise the mountains that constitute to the Valamara Mountains, while farther north stretches the connected mountain massifs of Shebenik and Jabllanicë.

The vast majority of the region's natural lakes are located in the southern half of the region and most of them are the product of a long contiguous history. The Lake of Ohrid lie adjacent to the border shared with North Macedonia. It is one of the oldest continuously existing lakes in the world with a unique biodiversity. Further south, well hidden among high mountains, extend the Lake of Prespa that is linked by a small channel with a sluice that separates the two lakes.

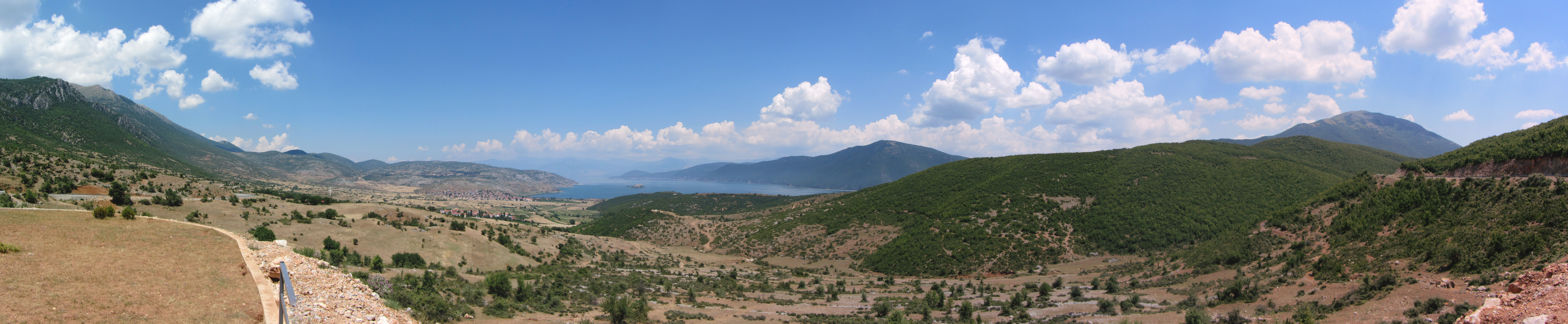
The Lake of Prespa part of the Prespa National Park and Ohrid-Prespa Transboundary Biosphere Reserve positioned in the southeastern edge of Albania.

=== Southern Mountain Range ===
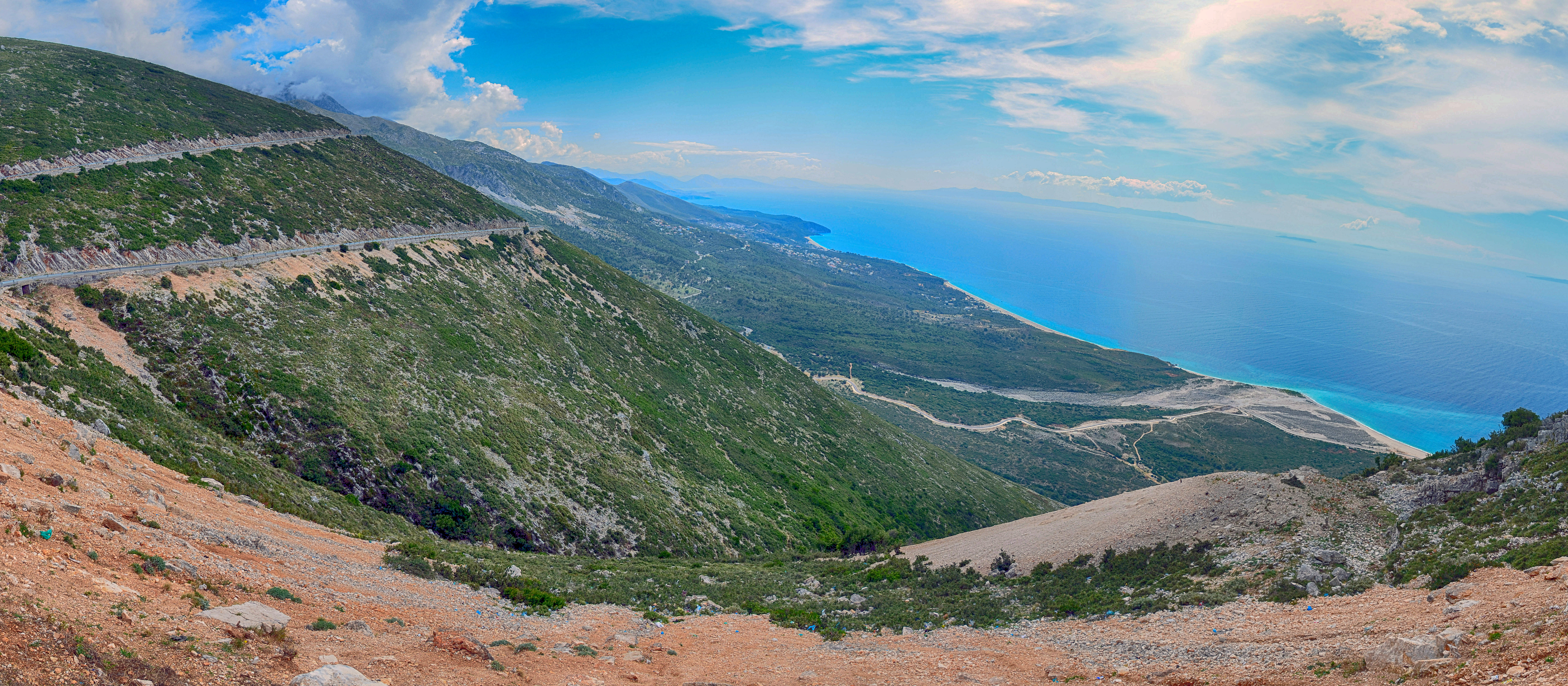
A view of the Albanian Riviera, from the Llogara National Park

The Ceraunian Mountains, a coastal mountain range in southwestern Albania, stretches about 100 kilometres (62 mi) besides the Ionian Sea from Sarandë in south-east-northwest direction along the Albanian Riviera to Orikum. The relief is varied, with many mountain passes, canyons, gorges, hills and other landforms. The mountains are characterized by housing Black pines, Bulgarian firs, Bosnian pines and Ash trees. The mountain chain is home to many large mammals, including brown bears, grey wolves, lynx, golden eagles and others. The highest point on the chain is Maja e Çikës, that rises to an elevation of 2,045 metres (6,709 ft) above the Adriatic. From the peak, there is a view of the Albanian Riviera, the northern Ionian Islands as well as the Italian coast of Apulia and Otranto. The section has wide and long beaches, with a number of bays and headlands.

Stretching until the Llogara Pass at 1,027 metres (3,369 ft), the mountain chain gets separated into the Ceraunians in the west and the Akroceraunians (or Reza e Kanalit) in the east within the Karaburun Peninsula. The villages of Palasë, Dhërmi, Vuno, Himarë, Qeparo, Borsh, Pilur, Kudhës and Ilias are located on the Ceraunian range. The Llogara National Park covers an area of 10,100 square metres (109,000 sq ft).

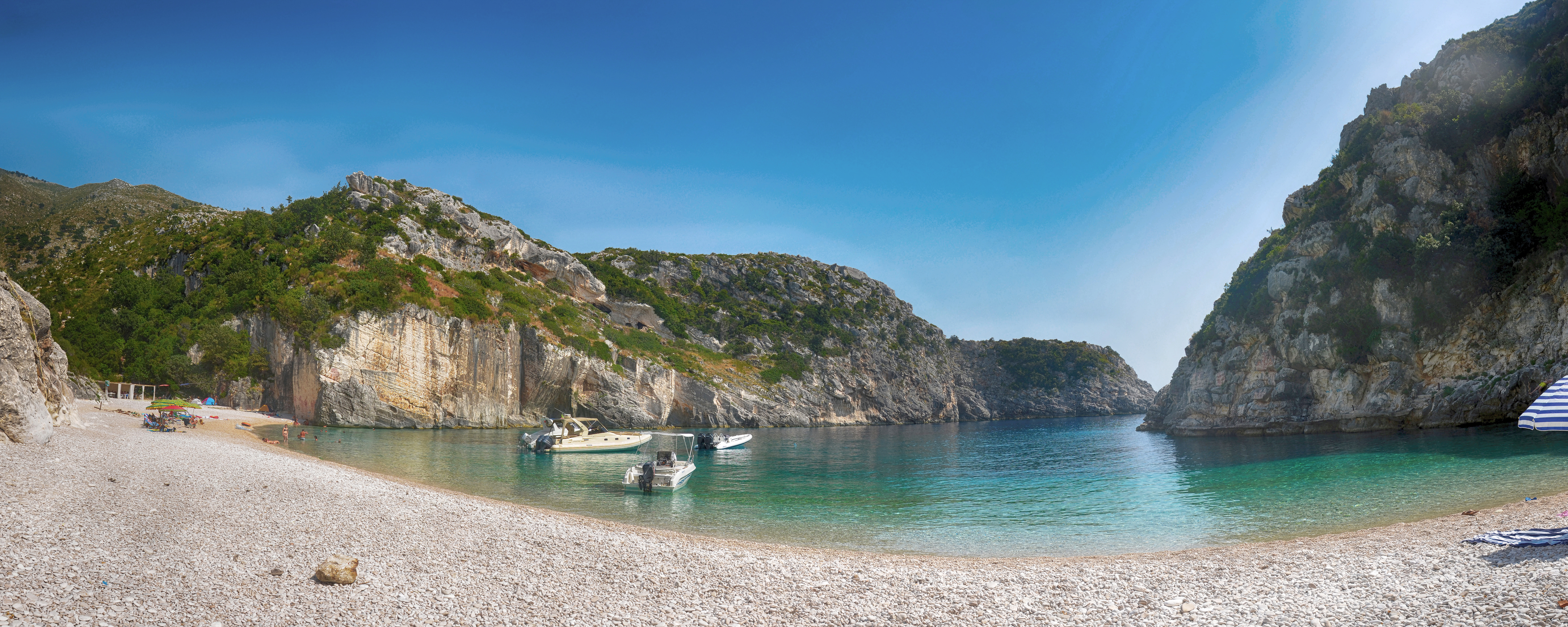
A scenic view of Gjiri i Gramës

The Karaburun Peninsula is situated at the eastern side of Strait of Otranto, where the Adriatic Sea meets the Ionian Sea. Its area is 62 square kilometres (24 sq mi), having a length of 16 kilometres (9.9 mi), and a width of only 5 kilometres (3.1 mi). The Mesokanali is the narrow channel, that separates the peninsula from the Sazan Island. Geologically, it is made up of carbonic limestone, dating back to the Mesozoic period, while in the northwestern it is composed of terrigenous sediment. Furthermore, these formations have been continuously under the effect of Karst and are exploited as marble. The relief of the peninsula comprises a number of hills with an average altitude of about 800 metres (2,600 ft) above the Adriatic. The highest summits are Maja e Ilqës 733 metres (2,405 ft), Maja e Flamurit 826 metres (2,710 ft) and Maja Çadëri 839 metres (2,753 ft).

The coastal landscape is characterized by a rough relief, that dips vertically into the Ionian Sea, it features several solitary peaks, large canyons, bays, caves and gulfs. Examples of typical landforms include Gjipe Canyon, Gjiri i Arushës, Gjiri i Dafinës, Gjiri i Gramës and so on. The geological evolution has formed also capes such as Haxhi Aliu, Galloveci and Kepi i Gjuhëzës, and other of 20 caves along the entire shoreline. The climate is Mediterranean, having hot summers and generally warm to cool, dry winters. Due to its climatic, hydrological and geological conditions, the area is characterized by its unique flora and fauna. Most of the territory consists of forests and is relatively well preserved, it includes many types of trees, such as Mediterranean oak, Manna ash, Kermes oak, and Field maple.

== See also ==
- Environment of Albania
- Climate of Albania
- Biodiversity of Albania
