= Llogara National Park =

National park and a tourist attraction in Albania

Llogora National Park
- Parku Kombëtar i Llogarasë
- IUCN category II (national park)
- Official logo

- Location within Albania Location within Europe
- Location: Vlorë County
- Nearest town: Orikum
- Coordinates: 40.2145°N 19.5809°E
- Area: 1,769.20 hectares (17.6920 km^{2})
- Designated: 21 November 1966
- Governing body: National Agency of Protected Areas

Llogara National Park (Albanian: Parku Kombëtar i Llogarasë/Llogorasë) is a national park centered on the Ceraunian Mountains along the Albanian Riviera in southwestern Albania, spanning a surface area of 1,769 ha (17.69 km^{2}). The park's terrain includes large alpine meadows, vertical rock faces, precipices and dense forests. Most area of the park is covered by forests and was established in 1966 to protect several ecosystems and biodiversity of national importance. The International Union for Conservation of Nature (IUCN) has listed the park as Category II. The region has been recognised as an important Bird and Plant Area, supporting significant number of species.

The park features outstanding diversity with the landscape ranging from the alpine peaks of the Ceraunian Mountains covered with snow in winter to the sunny Albanian Ionian Sea Coast in summer. At 1,027 m (3,369 ft), the Llogara Pass provides a striking scenery, with tall mountains overlooking the Albanian Riviera and several islands in the sea. The region experiences a mediterranean climate. This means that the summers are hot and the winters generally dry to warm to cool. Despite the vicinity to the mediterranean climatic region, an alpine climate prevails at the Maja e Çikës. Geomorphologically, carbonate rocks occupy most of the area, while the mountains are composed of limestones and dolomites.

Phytogeographically, the park falls within the Illyrian deciduous forests terrestrial ecoregion of the Palearctic Mediterranean forests, woodlands, and scrub biome. Its flora is diverse and characterised with high endemism, due to the combination of southern geographic latitude and high altitude variation. The forests are composed of diverse deciduous and coniferous species among other by bosnian pine, black pine, bulgarian fir, silver fir, ash trees, kermes oak and other species. Air currents that flow through the area have caused trees to bend in many interesting shapes, such as the Pisha e Flamurit. The vertebrate fauna consists of a wide range of species. Among the species of highest conservation value are the griffon vulture, golden eagle, rock partridge, fallow deer, roe deer, european wildcat, chamois, red squirrel, otter, wolf and red fox.

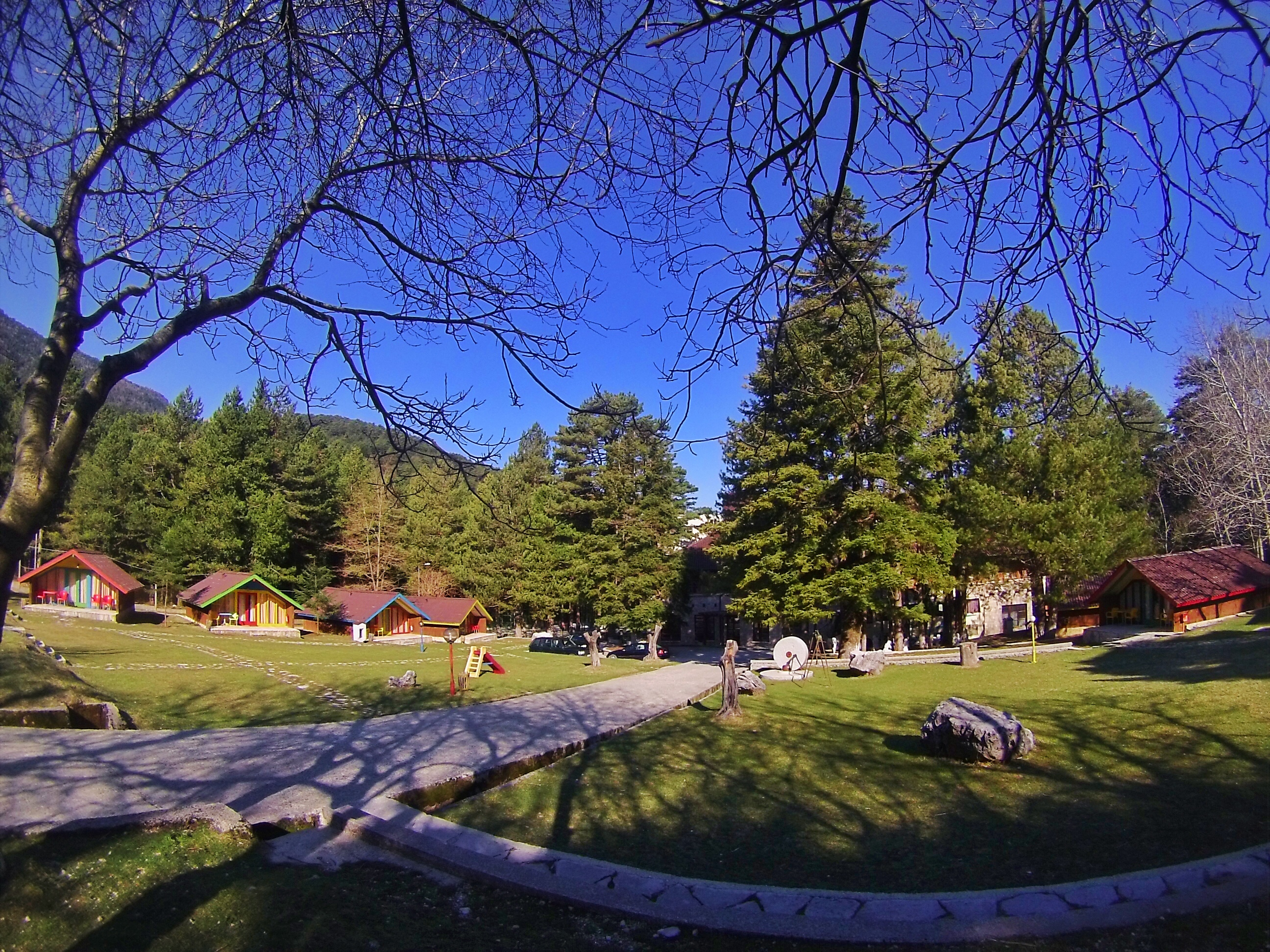
Tourist village in Llogara

Tourism is the most important sector in the park and has the largest potential to be a source for sustainable income. Along the National Road 8 there are several restaurants, hotels, and a small wooden cabin complex. The area of the park and the surrounding mountains are used mainly for hiking and tracking tours. A paragliding site serving annually as the 9th FAI World Paragliding Accuracy Championship venue is located south of the park. Along the twisting road are several local vendors of honey and mountain tea. Caesar's Pass, named after Julius Caesar who marched down near the area in pursuit of Pompey, is also located nearby the Llogara Pass.

== Environment ==
=== Geography ===
The Llogara National Park is strategically located within the Ceraunian Mountains, southeast of Orikum. It lies mostly between latitudes 40° and 12° N and longitudes 19° and 34° E. The park comprises 1,010 ha (10.1 km^{2}) in Vlorë County in southwestern Albania along the Ionian Sea. The park's elevation vary between 200 m (660 ft) up to 2,020 m (6,630 ft) above the Adriatic. Due to the close proximity to the Mediterranean Sea, the sea has a significant effect on the climate of the region. The park enjoys a mediterranean climate with subtropical influences, with moderate rainy and dry winters and warm to hot summers. Its mean monthly temperature ranges between 12 °C (54 °F) in January and 32 °C (90 °F) in July. The mean annual precipitation ranges between 1,000 millimetres (39 inches) and 1,200 millimetres (47 inches) depending on geographic region and prevailing climate type.

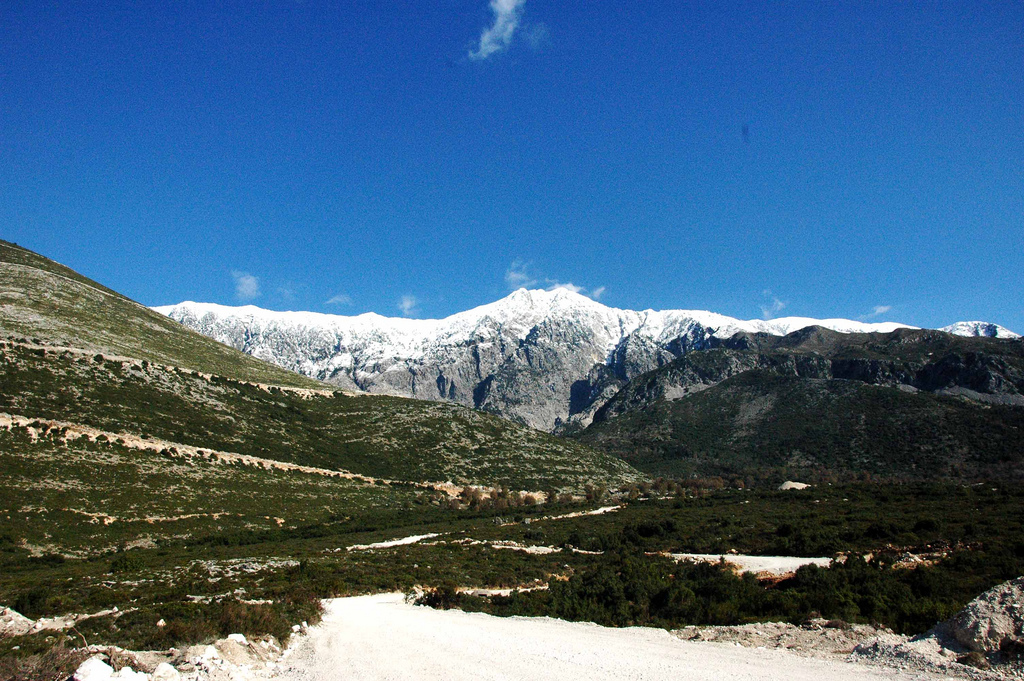
Maja e Çikës as seen from the beach of the village of Dhërmi.

Llogara, a mountain pass that rises to an elevation of 1,027 m (3,369 ft) between Maja e Çikës and Maja e Gjipalit, is the watershed between the Adriatic Sea in the north and the Ionian Sea in the south. The pass lies on a tectonic uplift line of two tectonic zones that of Sazan on the southwest and that of Jonike on the northeast. It leads the Dukat Valley to the southern end of Vlora Bay close to Orikum. To the south, the pass is very rugged and steep, falling down into the Ionian Sea, whose coast is only three kilometers away, but more than 1,000 m (3,300 ft) below. Moreover, to the south the pass opens and offers impressive views over the Albanian Riviera, that of Sazani on the southwest and that of Jonike on the northeast.

Geologically, like most of the mountains in the region, Llogara is made up of carbonic and flysch deposits from the Mesozoic and Paleozoic period. Rising on the Ceraunian Mountains, the pass separates the mountain chain into two chains, with Reza e Kanalit, also known as the Akroceraunian Mountains, encompassing the western portion within the Karaburun Peninsula. The highest peaks of the Ceraunian Mountains are Maja e Çikës standing at 2,045 m (6,709 ft) and Maja e Qorres standing at 2,018 m (6,621 ft) descending towards the Llogara Pass. Reza e Kanalit is about 24 km (15 mi) long and about 4–7 km (2.5–4.3 mi) wide.

=== Biodiversity ===
Like most of the Albanian coast along the Adriatic and Ionian Sea, Llogara belongs to one of the most significant areas of the country, specifically due to climatic conditions and on the other hand due to the topography of this area. Moreover, the park is heavily forested, mainly with pine, oak and fir trees growing on limestone and dolomite.

== See also ==
- Geography of Albania
- Protected areas of Albania
- Llogara Pass
- Llogara Tragedy
