= Canyon of Gjipe =

Canyon in Albania and tourist attraction

- IUCN category V (protected landscape/seascape)
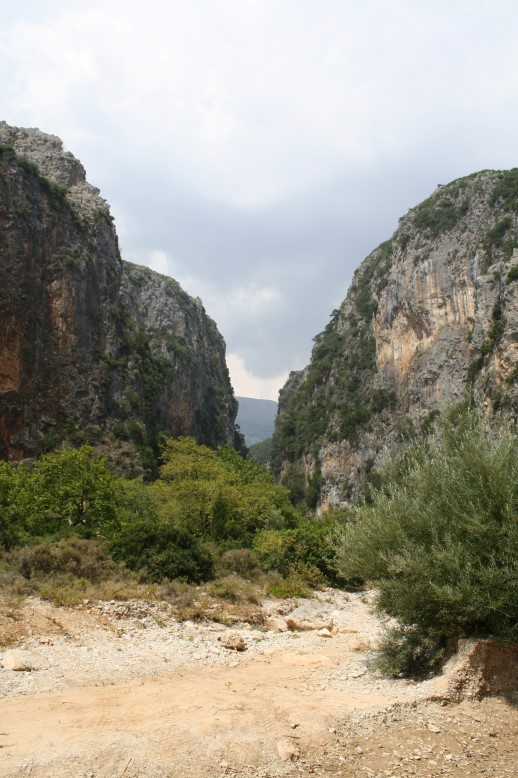
- Canyon of Gjipe

- Location within Albania Location within Europe
- Location: Vlorë County
- Nearest city: Himara, Vlorë
- Coordinates: 40°8′37″N 19°40′13″E
- Area: 1,200 hectares (12 km^{2})
- Designation: Protected Landscape Area

The Canyon of Gjipe (Albanian: Kanioni i Gjipesë) is a bay and calcareous canyon located between Dhërmi and Vuno carved by the Ionian Sea in Vlorë County, Albania. The canyon occupies a length of 800 metres (2,600 ft), and a width that can varies between 10 metres (33 ft) and 20 metres (66 ft). It represents a narrow strait, created by the activity of the brook flowing through its narrow pass. There are numerous rock formations along the canyon, including a number of caves.

Located at the transition zone of the Adriatic Sea and Ionian Sea, the scenery is among the most visited attractions along the Albanian Riviera. Nonetheless, the canyon has been further recognised as an Important Plant Area of international importance by Plantlife, because it supports a number of rare and endemic species.

In terms of phytogeography, the canyon belongs to the Illyrian province of the circumboreal region within the boreal Kingdom. It falls completely within the Illyrian deciduous forests terrestrial ecoregion of the Palearctic Mediterranean forests, woodlands, and scrub biome. Among vegetation elements, the presence is extremely significant of the carob and olive, which has been produced since antiquity throughout the country.

The specific landscape right beside the sea and the particular climate have favored the development of a vast array of faunal species that demonstrates an eminent quality. The canyon contains shallow coastal waters which provide sufficient habitat for the loggerhead sea turtle, the most familiar turtle in the Mediterranean Sea. Dolphins are not really that uncommon in the region. Three species of dolphins have been identified within its waters amongst them the cuvier's beaked whale, common bottlenose dolphin and short-beaked common dolphin.

== See also ==
- List of rock formations in Albania
- Geography of Albania
- Protected areas of Albania
- Albanian Ionian Sea Coast
