= Ceraunian Mountains =

Mountain range in Albania

- Malet e Vetëtimës
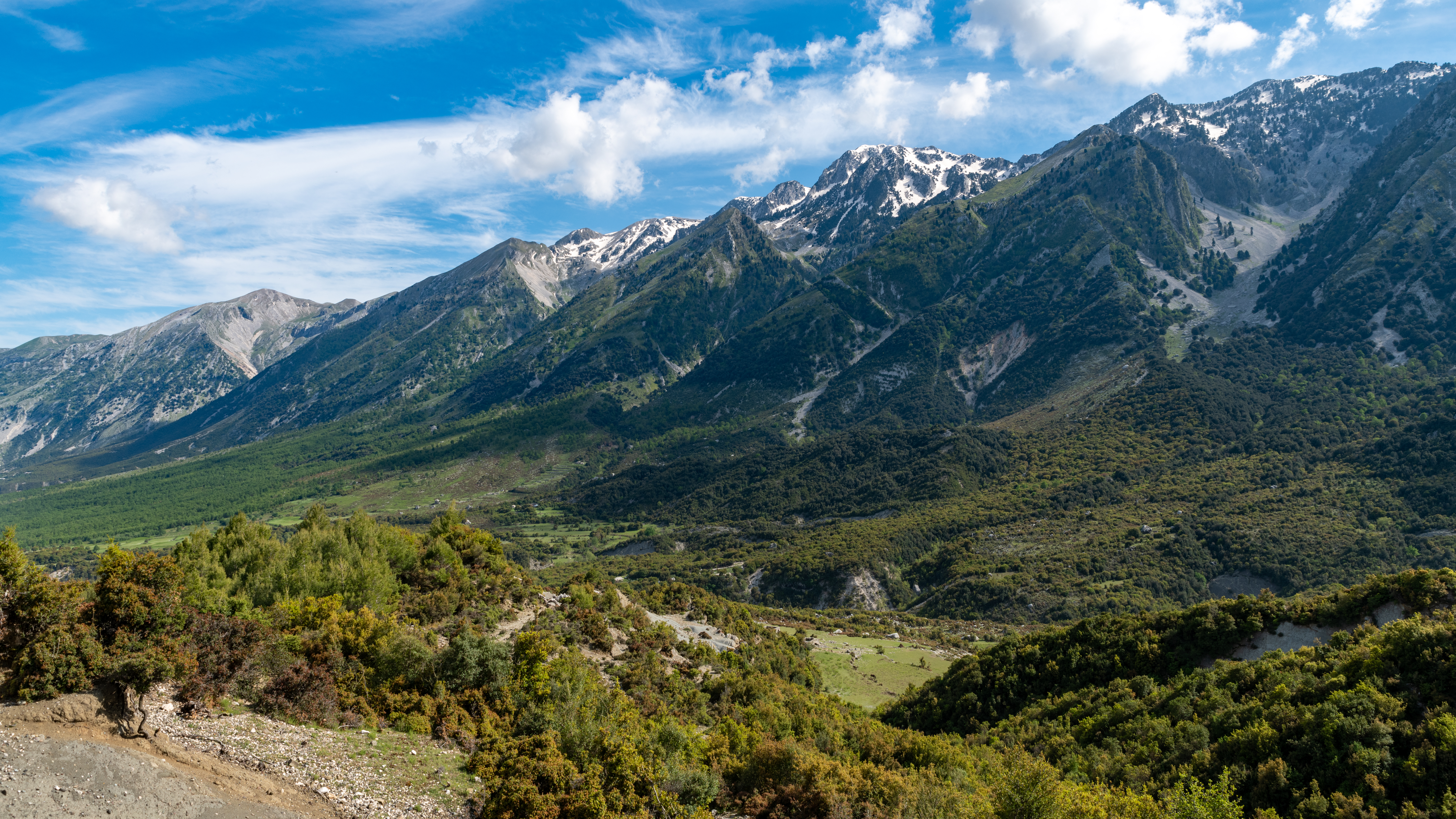
- View of Çikë and its surroundings

Highest point
- Coordinates: 40°11′53″N 19°38′20.27″E

Geography
- Location within Albania
- Location: Vlorë County, Albania

Geology
- Rock age: Triassic
- Mountain type: Limestone

The Ceraunian Mountains (Albanian: Malet e Vetëtimës, Albanian pronunciation: [ˈmalet e vetəˈtiməs], 'Thunderbolt Mountains') are a coastal mountain range in southwestern Albania, within the Vlorë County.

The mountain range rises on the northeastern bank of the Ionian Sea and protrudes into the Adriatic Sea. It extends for approximately 100 km (62 mi) in a southeast-northwest direction near Sarandë, along the Albanian Riviera, close to Orikum. Geologically, the Karaburun Peninsula belongs to the Ceraunian Mountains, and is separated from the rest by the Llogara Pass (1,027 metres (3,369 ft)) forming the western part of the Ceraunian mountain range, called Acroceraunian Mountains (Albanian: Malet Akrokeraune). The mountains are about 24 km (15 mi) long and about 4–7 km (2.5–4.3 mi) wide. The highest peak is Çikë with an elevation of 2,044 metres (6,706 ft).

== Name ==
In classical antiquity, the name of the mountains was recorded in Ancient Greek as Κεραύνια ὄρη Keraunia ore, meaning "thunder-split peaks". The western part of the mountain chain is called Ἀκροκεραύνια Akrokeraunia, meaning 'Cape Thunder' which referred to the modern Karaburun peninsula. Both names Ceraunia and Acroceraunia illustrate the bad weather and the danger found there by ancient seafarers and travellers. Moreover, the Acroceraunian promontory located on the western side of the bay of Vlorë (ancient Aulon) equates to the modern Karaburun Peninsula also known as cape Linguetta.

In Latin the name of the mountains was recorded as Ceraunii montes or Acroceraunii montes. In Albanian, the native name of the mountains is Malet e Vetëtimës, while Malet Akrokeraune contains the ancient name. In Modern Greek the name of the mountains is Κεραύνια Όρη Keraunia Ori.

== Geology ==
The range consists of Çikë 2,045 m (6,709 ft) and Qorre 2,018 m (6,621 ft), which are the roughest and most rugged parts of the southwestern relief, due to their extension in the Ionian and Sazan tectonic zones. The mountain range is divided by dry streams and deep abysses, with sparsely covered vegetation, dominated by pine trees (up to 600–800 m) in the lower part and conifers (black pine, spruce, hemlock, etc.) in the upper part.

== History ==
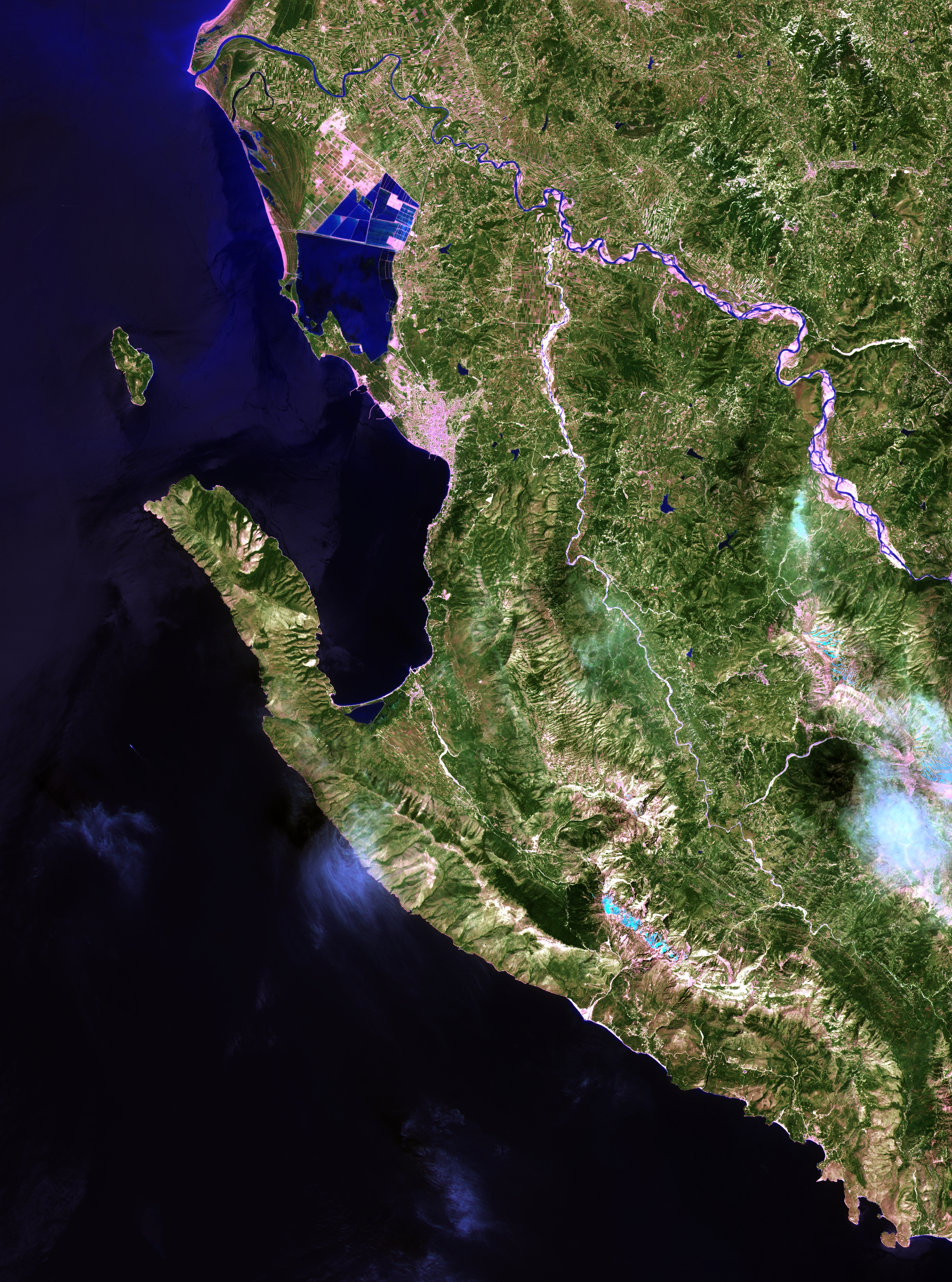

In classical antiquity, the Ceraunian Mountains represented a natural border between the historical and geographical regions of Illyria and Epirus. As a border region to the north of these mountains Illyrian populations were located, while the Epirotes, in particular the Chaonians, were located in the south of these mountains.

In Hellenistic times, Çikë formed the southern border of the territory of Oricum. In that period Çika also separated the territory of Oricum from the tribe of the Amantes to the east, who built the fortified settlement of Cerje beyond Shëngjergji Pass.

The Akrokeraunian peninsula had the most important stone quarries in Illyria. Most of the quality limestone used for the construction of temples and monuments in Apollonia, in particular, came from there, perhaps after the conquest of Thronion c. 450 BC.

According to Ancient Greek mythology, the Abantes from Euboea who had previously joined the Ancient Greek army in the Trojan War settled in the Ceraunian Mountains. They were later expelled by the forces from Apollonia.

During the 15th-16th centuries the warlike community of the region of Himara emerged.

== Cult and mythology ==
Zeus, the central figure of the Greek Pantheon, was associated with the Ceraunian Mountains being a popular deity among the Chaonians as well as the rest of northern Greece as Zeus Chaonius.

It was said that Geryones guarded his cattle in those mountains.

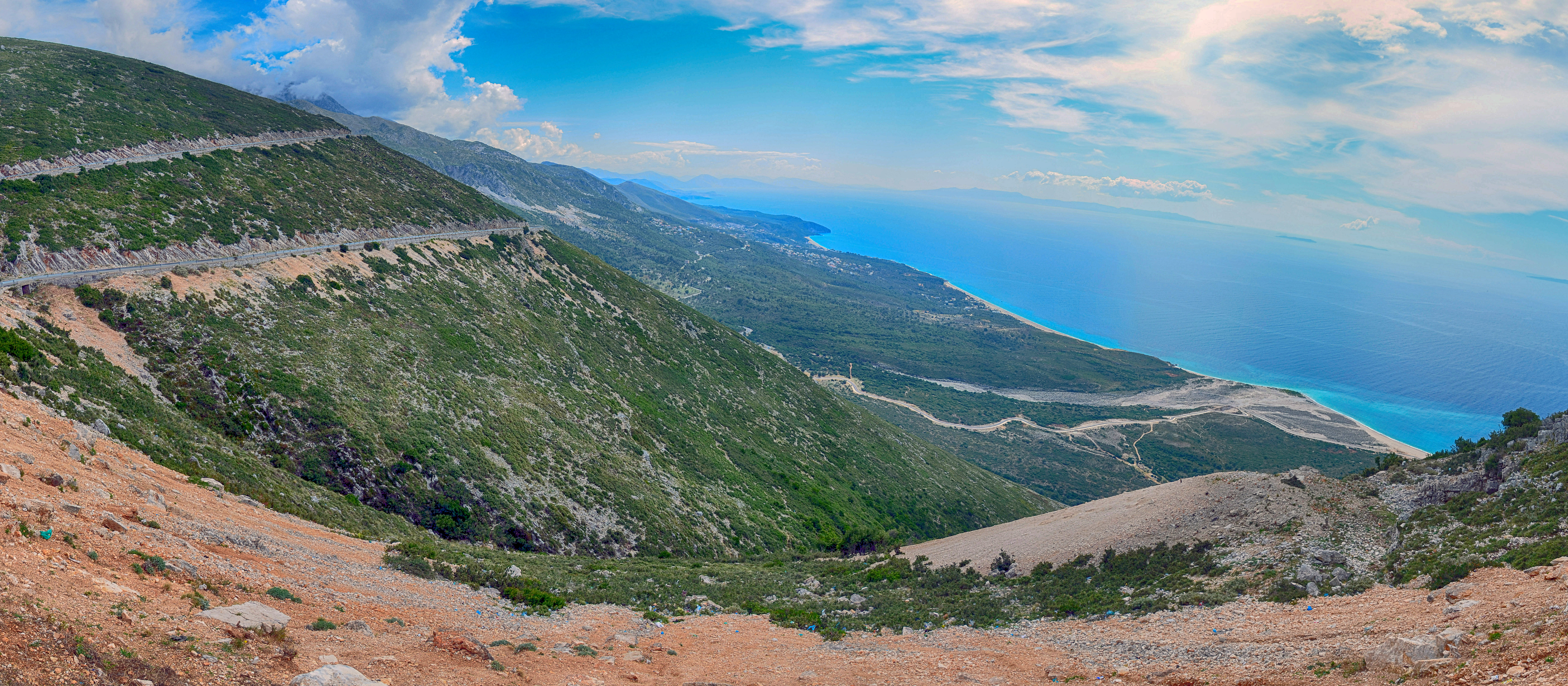
The coastline of Himara seen from the pass of Llogara.

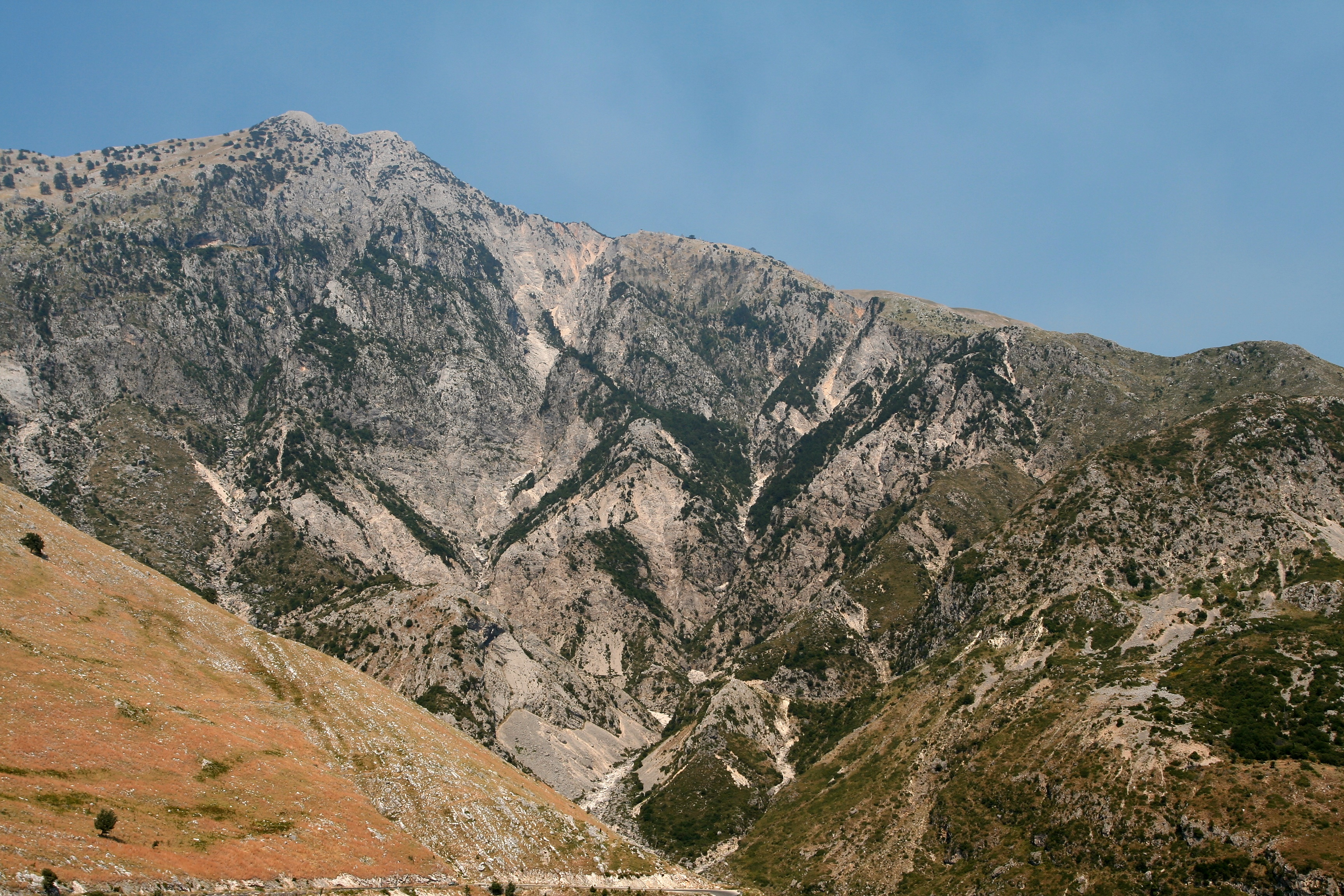
Çikë

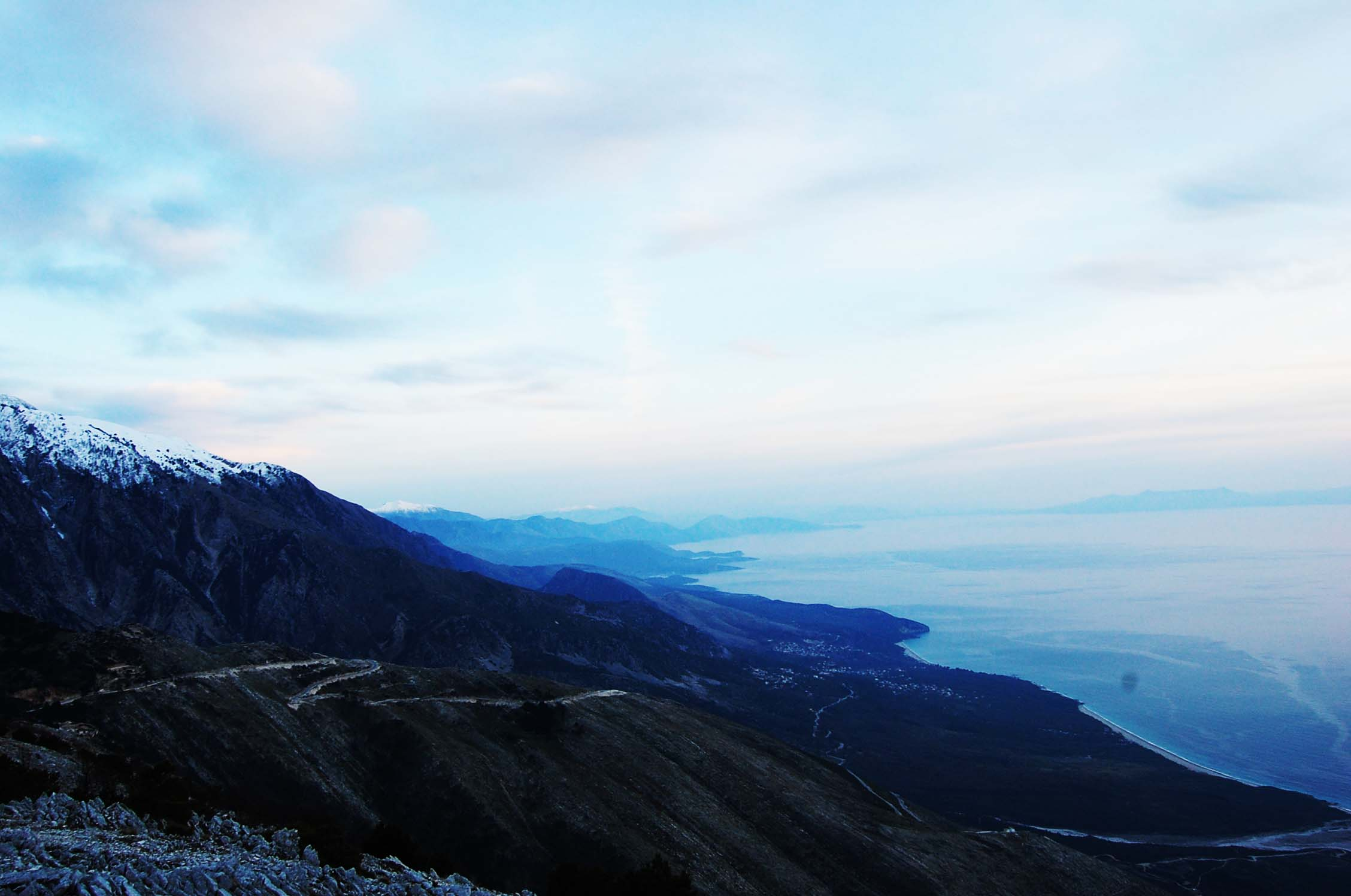
View from Çikë

== See also ==
- Geography of Albania
- Llogara National Park

== Bibliography ==
- Bejko, Lorenc; Morris, Sarah; Papadopoulos, John; Schepartz, Lynne (2015). The Excavation of the Prehistoric Burial Tumulus at Lofkend, Albania. ISD LLC. ISBN 978-1938770524.
- Bogdani, Julian (2011). "Le residenze rurali della Caonia ellenistica. Note per una nuova lettura". Agri Centuriati. 8. Fabrizio Serra Editore: 121–144. ISSN 1825-1277.
- Chapinal-Heras, Diego (2021). Experiencing Dodona: The Development of the Epirote Sanctuary from Archaic to Hellenistic Times. Berlin and Boston: Walter de Gruyter GmbH & Co KG. ISBN 9783110727593.
- De Maria, Sandro; Bogdani, Jylian; Giorgi, Enrico (2017). "Ricerca e tutela in un territorio di frontiera. L'Epiro del Nord fra età ellenistica e presenza di Roma". In Gianluca Mastrocinque (ed.). Paesaggi mediterranei di età romana. Archeologia, tutela, comunicazione. Bibliotheca archaeologica. Vol. 47. Edipuglia. doi:10.4475/835. ISBN 978-88-7228-835-1. ISSN 1724-8523.

Morton, Jamie (18 September 2017). The Role of the Physical Environment in Ancient Greek Seafaring. BRILL. p. 77. ISBN 978-90-04-35107-3.

- Shpuza, Saimir; Consagra, Gionata; Descoeuderes, Jean-Paul; Bereti, Vasil (2018). Jean-Luc Lamboley; Luan Përzhita; Altin Skenderaj (eds.). "Récentes découvertes sur le site d'Orikos: Un bilan des campagnes de fouilles 2012-2015". L'Illyrie méridionale et l'Épire dans l'antiquité - VI. II. Diffusion De Boccard. ISBN 978-9928-4517-2-9.
- Shpuza, Saimir; Cipa, Kriledjan (2021). "Prospections archéologiques sur le territoire d'Orikos". SLSA Jahresbericht – Rapport Annuel – Annual Report 2020.
- Shpuza, Saimir (2022). "D'un limên à une polis. Orikos aux périodes archaïque et classique". In Brancato, Rodolfo (ed.). Schemata: la città oltre la forma: per una nuova definizione dei paesaggi urbani e delle loro funzioni: urbanizzazione e società nel Mediterraneo pre-classico: età arcaica. Edizioni Quasar. ISBN 9788854912755.
- Shrimpton, Gordon S. (1991). Theopompus the historian. McGill-Queen's University Press. ISBN 978-0-7735-6291-2.
- Stocker, Sharon R. (2009). Illyrian Apollonia: Toward a New Ktisis and Developmental History of the Colony (Thesis). University of Cincinnati.
- Zindel, Christian; Lippert, Andreas; Lahi, Bashkim; Kiel, Machiel (2018). Albanien: Ein Archäologie- und Kunstführer von der Steinzeit bis ins 19. Jahrhundert (in German). Vandenhoeck & Ruprecht. ISBN 9783205200109.
