= Mali i Çikës =

Mountain in Albania

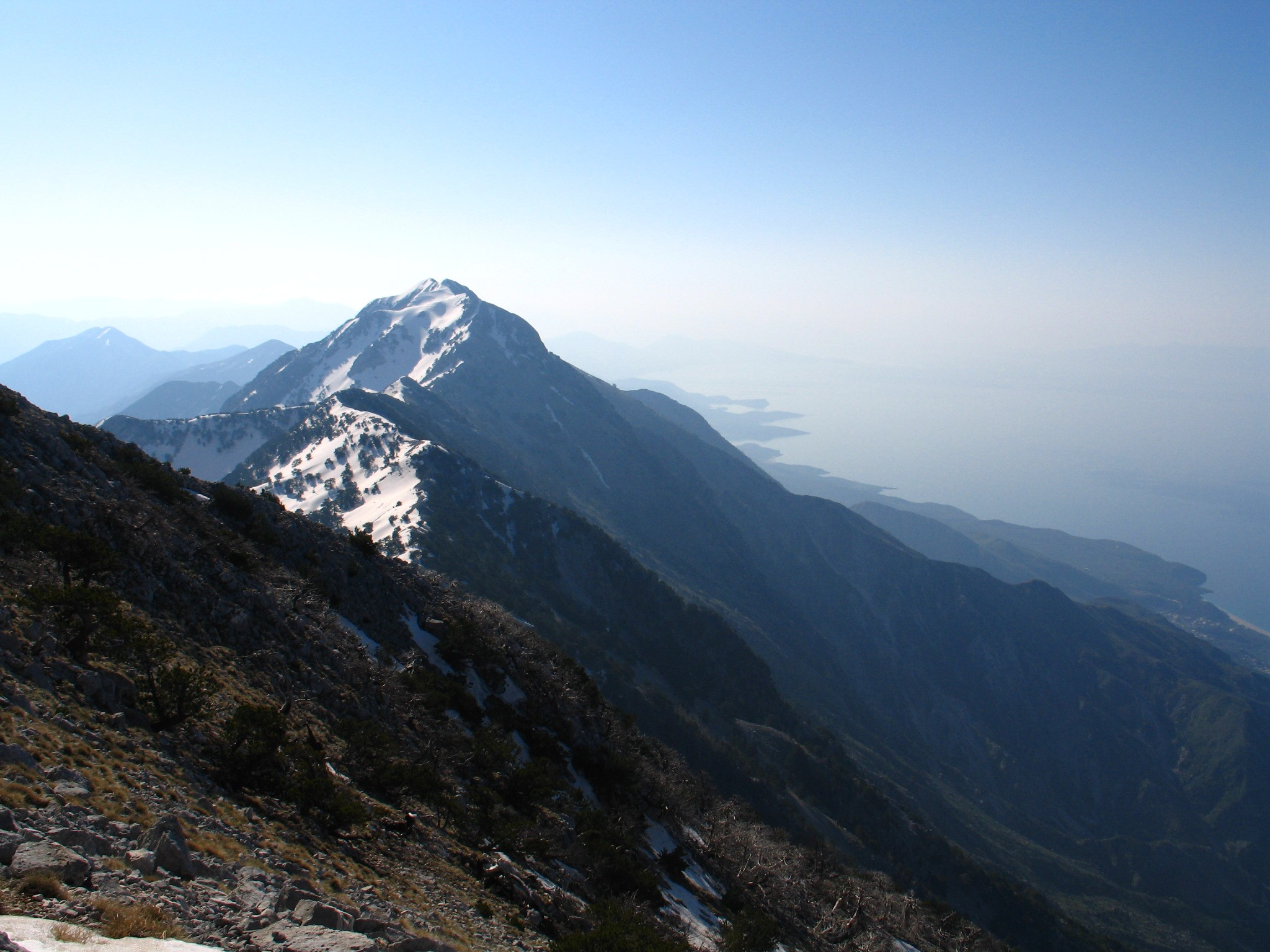
- Çikë summit overlooking the Ionian coast

Highest point
- Elevation: 2,045 m (6,709 ft)
- Prominence: 1,564 m (5,131 ft)
- Isolation: 19.1 km (11.9 mi)
- Listing: Ultra, Ribu
- Coordinates: 40°12′56″N 19°36′25″E

Naming
- English translation: Lady's mountain

Geography
- Location within Albania
- Country: Albania
- Region: Southern Mountain Region
- Municipality: Himarë
- Parent range: Ceraunian Mountains

Geology
- Rock age: Mesozoic
- Mountain type: summit
- Rock type(s): limestone, dolomite

Mali i Çikës (lit. 'Lady's mountain') is a massif in southwestern Albania, forming one of the most rugged and elevated sections of the Ceraunian Mountains. It stretches from the valley of Kudhës stream in the southeast to Shëngjergj Pass in the northwest, dominating the landscape above the coastal region of Himarë and the inland valley of Dukat.

Rising progressively in a northwesterly direction, it reaches its highest elevations around the Llogara Pass area, with Maja e Çikës (2,045 m) and Maja e Qorres (2,018 m).

== Geology ==
Mali i Çikës represents a large anticline composed primarily of Mesozoic limestones belonging to the Ionian tectonic zone. These rocks were uplifted to their present height by neotectonic movements that shaped much of southern Albania’s modern relief. The western side of the massif is sharply disrupted by a major tectonic fault, along which large limestone blocks have shifted and overlain one another, creating a series of stepped escarpments that descend abruptly toward the Ionian Sea.

This dramatic structural descent is responsible for creating the elevated coastal terrace historically known as the Upper Coast (Albanian: Bregdeti i Sipërm), extending from Palasë to Qeparo.

Its eastern slope exhibits a more subdued inclination and descends toward the longitudinal depression of the Shushicë valley.

At the southeastern extremity rises Maja e Lëpjetës (1,199 m), above the village of Pilur. Northwest of it stands Mali i Mesofijes, distinguished by the peaks of Mesimer (1,694 m) and Bogonicë (1,672 m).

== Biodiversity ==
The lower slopes up to approximately 600–800 meters are covered with dense Mediterranean maquis consisting of evergreen xerophytic shrubs such as mastic, strawberry tree, heath, broom, sage and related species. Around Himarë and Pilur, valonia oak forms locally dense woodland stands. Between 800 and 1,500 meters the plant cover becomes noticeably scarce and more discontinuous, with only scattered occurrences of Mediterranean fir and black pine. Above 1,500–1,600 meters arboreal vegetation largely disappears and is replaced by low mountain scrub and meadow grasses.

Along the western foothills of the Upper Coast, due to the milder climate this narrow strip supports the cultivation of numerous subtropical crops, including citrus fruits, olives, figs, almonds and pomegranates.

== See also ==
- List of mountains in Albania
