= Albanian Adriatic Sea Coast =

Albanian coastline of the south-eastern Adriatic Sea

- Coast
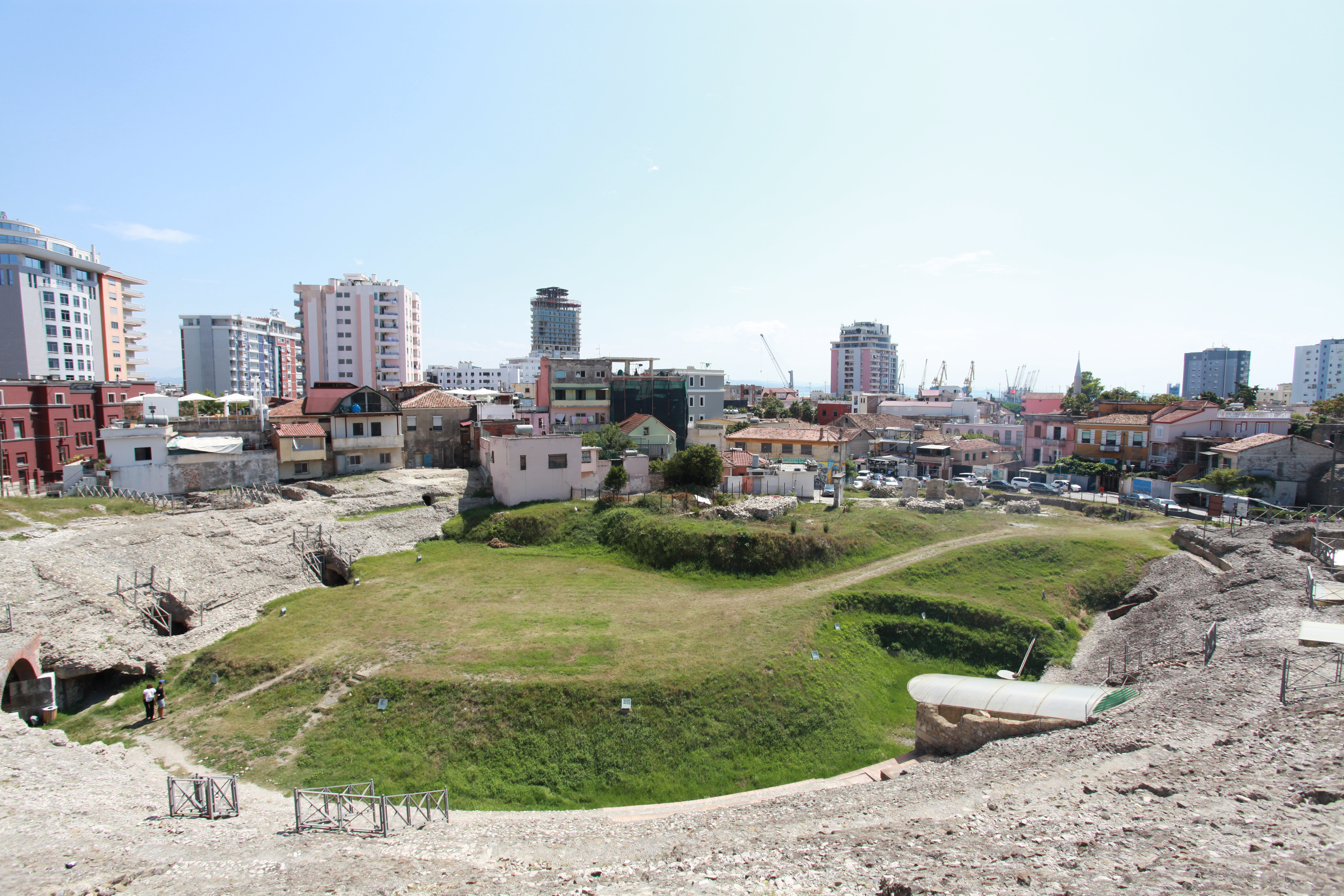
- The amphitheatre of the city of Durrës and its port in the background.

- Location within Albania Location within Europe
- Coordinates: 40°20′10″N 19°27′46″E
- Location: Adriatic Sea in Albania; Balkan Peninsula

Dimensions
  - Length: 274 kilometres (170 mi)

The Albanian Adriatic Sea Coast (Albanian pronunciation: [brɛˈɡdɛ:ti adriˈa:tik] — Albanian: Bregdeti Adriatik) stretches in the south-eastern Adriatic Sea beginning at the Gulf of Drin in the north, across the port cities of Shëngjin, Durrës, and Vlorë, to the Bay of Vlorë in the south, where the Albanian Riviera and the Albanian Ionian Sea Coast begin.

Albania is geographically located in Southern and South-eastern Europe within the Balkan Peninsula. It borders on Montenegro to the north-west, Kosovo to the north-east, North Macedonia to the east, Greece to the south, and the Mediterranean Sea to the west. The total length of the coastline is approximately 274 kilometres (170 mi), 178 kilometres (111 mi) of which are taken up by white sandy beaches and the rest by various other landforms.

The Adriatic Sea is the northernmost arm of the Mediterranean Sea, extending all the way from the Strait of Otranto in the south up to the Po Valley in the north. The sea is apportioned into two major basins, wherein Albania is entirely located within the deepest and the southernmost. The coastline is one of the wealthiest sceneries of the country in terms of biology, holding outstanding diversity of ecosystems and biodiversity found within a precious mosaic of wetlands, estuaries, capes, sand dunes, marshlands, forests and marine habitats.

At different times, numerous ancient people, most notably the Illyrians and later the Ancient Greeks and Romans, have established significant settlements around the shores. They were considerably influenced by their direct proximity to the sea because it provided routes for trade, colonization and war, as well as food; the Via Egnatia, that crossed through the mountains of Albania, was at that time among the most significant routes in the Roman Empire.

The coastline is populated by more than 1.5 million people. The most sizable cities are Durrës and Vlorë placed in the north and south, respectively. Durrës is served by Port of Durrës, one of the largest on the Adriatic Sea, which connects the city to Italy and other neighbouring countries within the Adriatic.

== Environment ==
=== Geography ===
Albania is geographically located on the Balkan Peninsula in South and Southeast Europe bordered by the countries of Montenegro to the northwest, Kosovo to the northeast, North Macedonia to the east and Greece to the south and southeast. The western edge touches the Adriatic and Ionian Sea, both within the Mediterranean Sea. The majority of the country's territory consists of mountains and hills, making Albania one of the most mountainous countries of Europe. Likely the Albanian Alps runs in the north the Korab Mountains in the east, the Ceraunian Mountains in the south and the Skanderbeg Mountains in the center, while the plains and plateaus are principally to be found in the west.

The Albanian Ionian Sea Coast is known for its rugged natural beauty, with rocky highlands and a great marine life, while the Albanian Adriatic Sea Coast consist of sandy beaches and shallow coastal waters hosting a great wildlife. Administratively, the Albanian Adriatic coast is shared between the counties of Shkodër in the north, Lezhë, Durrës, Tirana, Fier and Vlorë in the south.

The Albanian Adriatic Sea Coast begins from the estuary of Buna on the Gulf of Drin at the border with Montenegro, passes through Myzeqe Plain, the capes of Rodon, Turrës, Gjuhëzes, the cities of Shëngjin, Durrës, Vlorë, the estuaries of Drin, Mat, Ishëm, Erzen, Shkumbin, Seman, Vjosë and the lagoons of Karavasta, Narta Kune-Vain-Tale and Patoku, until it reaches the Bay of Vlorë. Numerous rivers flowing into the Adriatic Sea form bays, lagoons and limans. The sand and silt they bring are deposited in the areas of reduced flow, that is the sides of the bays, forming narrow sandbanks.

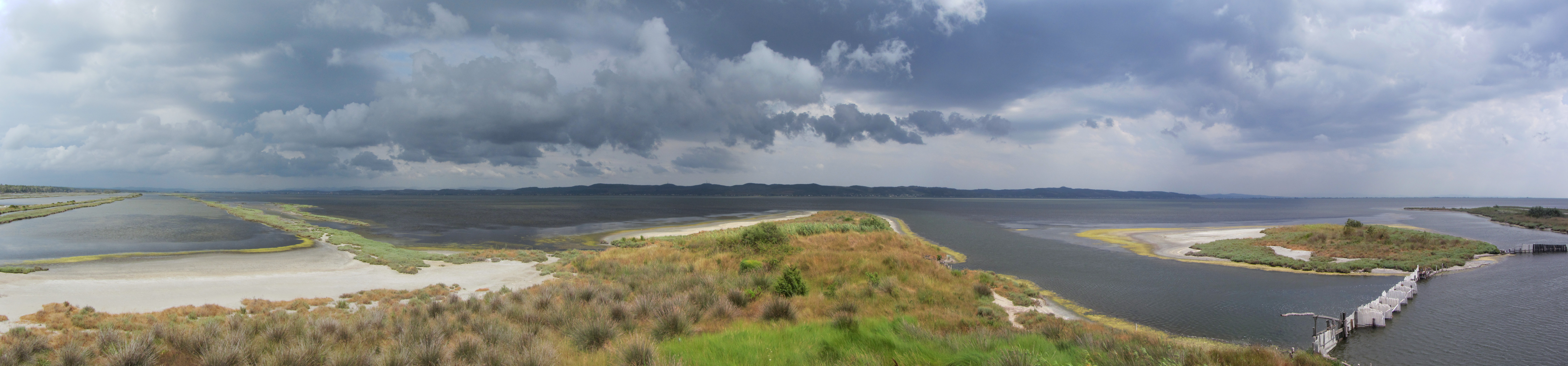
The Karavasta Lagoon, located within the Divjakë-Karavasta National Park, is among the largest lagoons in the Mediterranean Sea.

=== Biodiversity ===
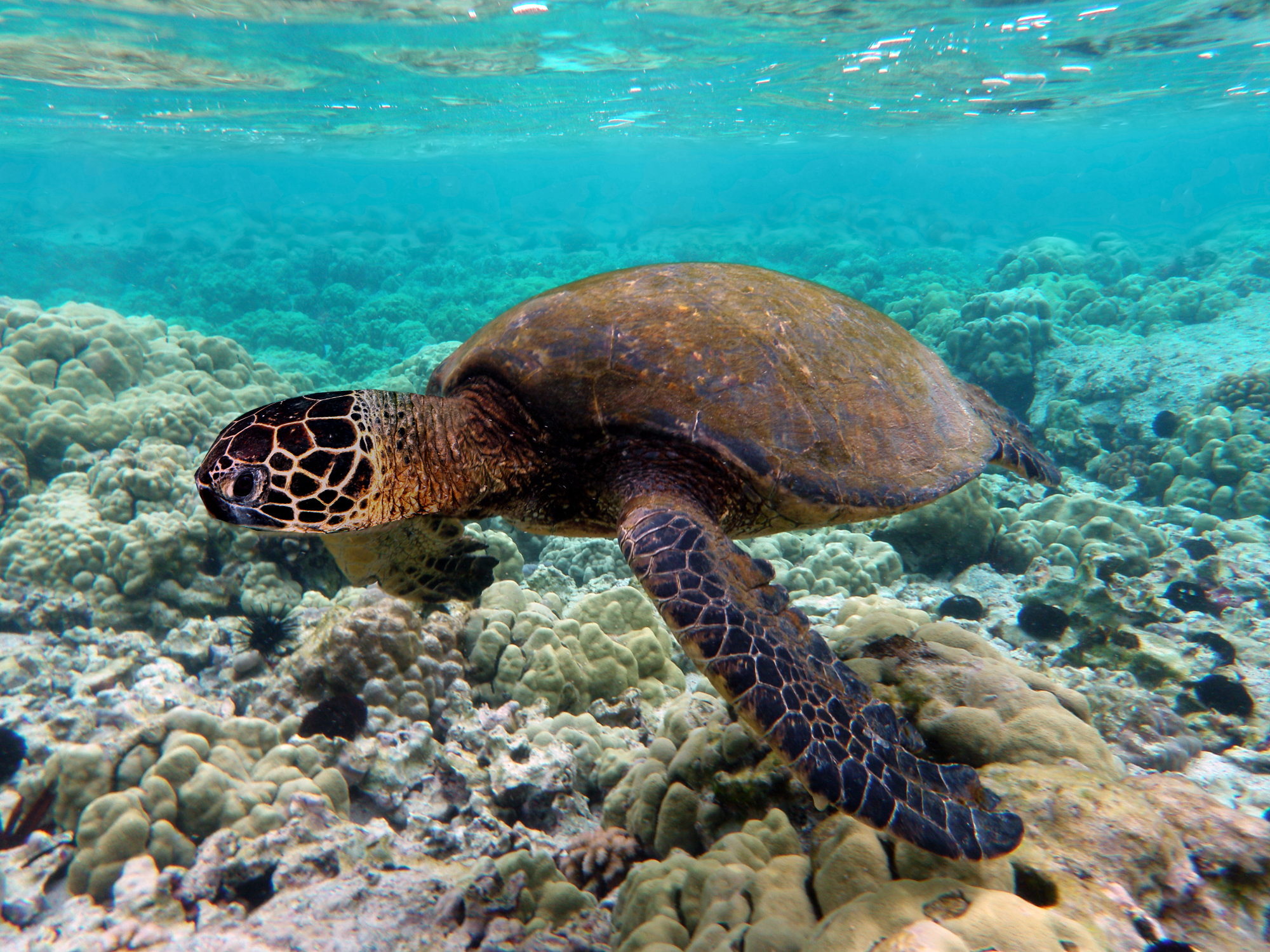
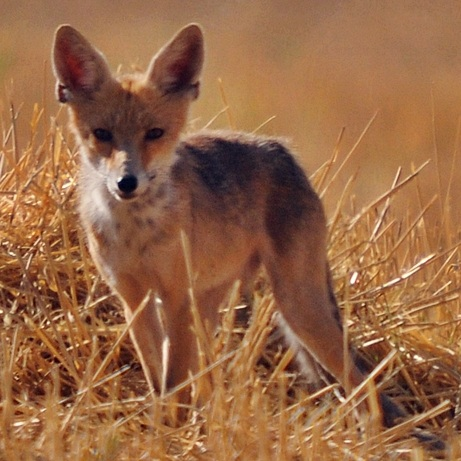
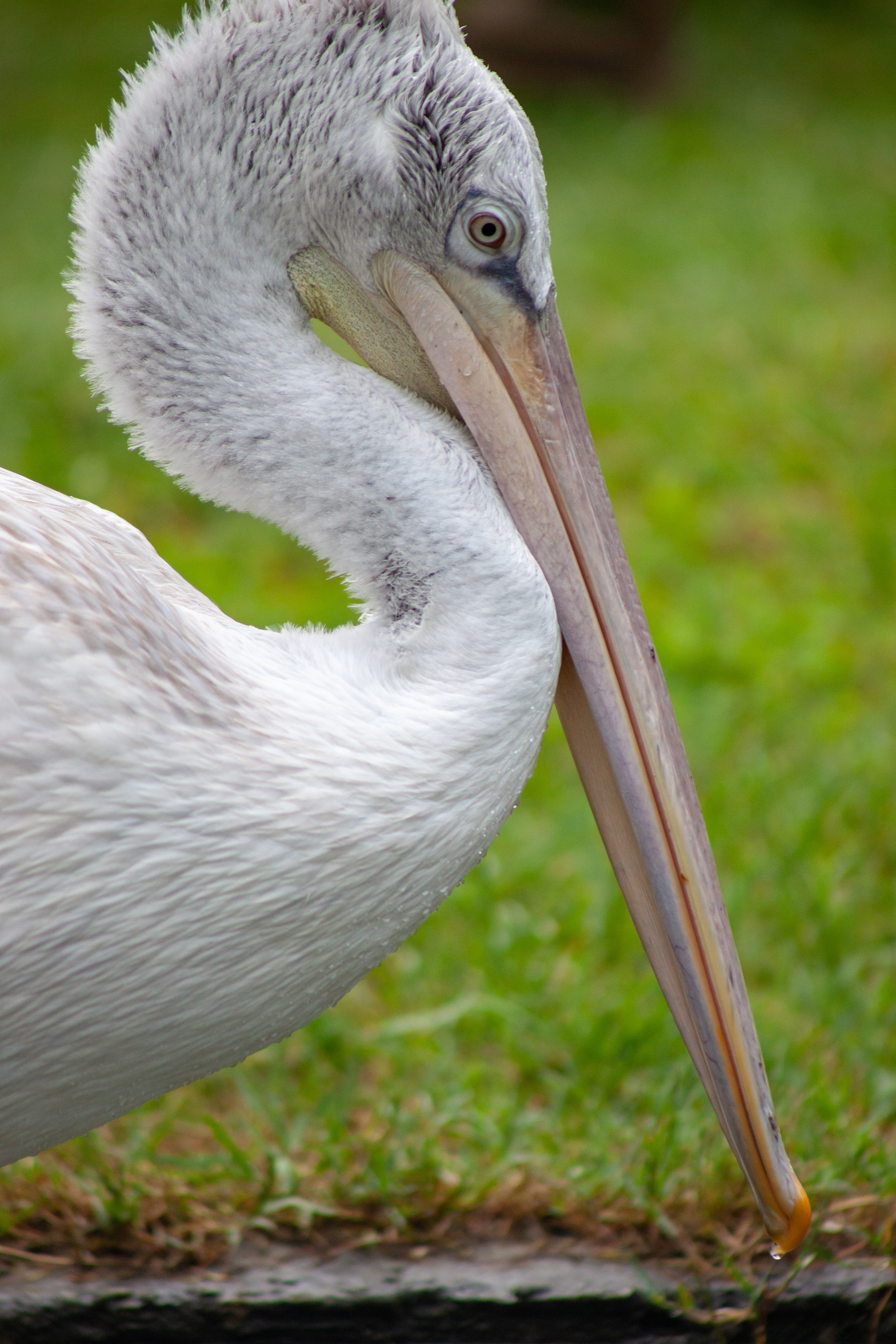
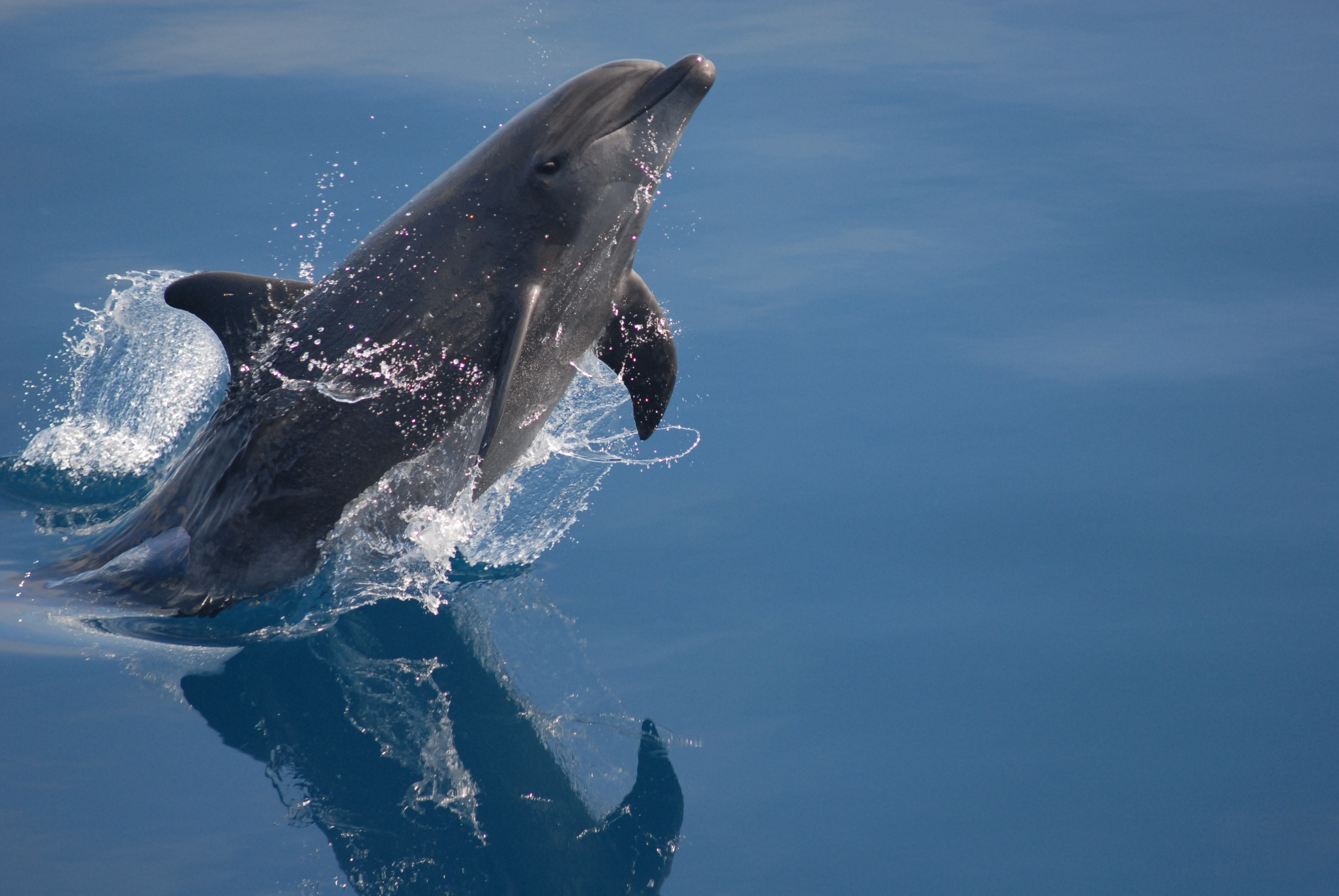
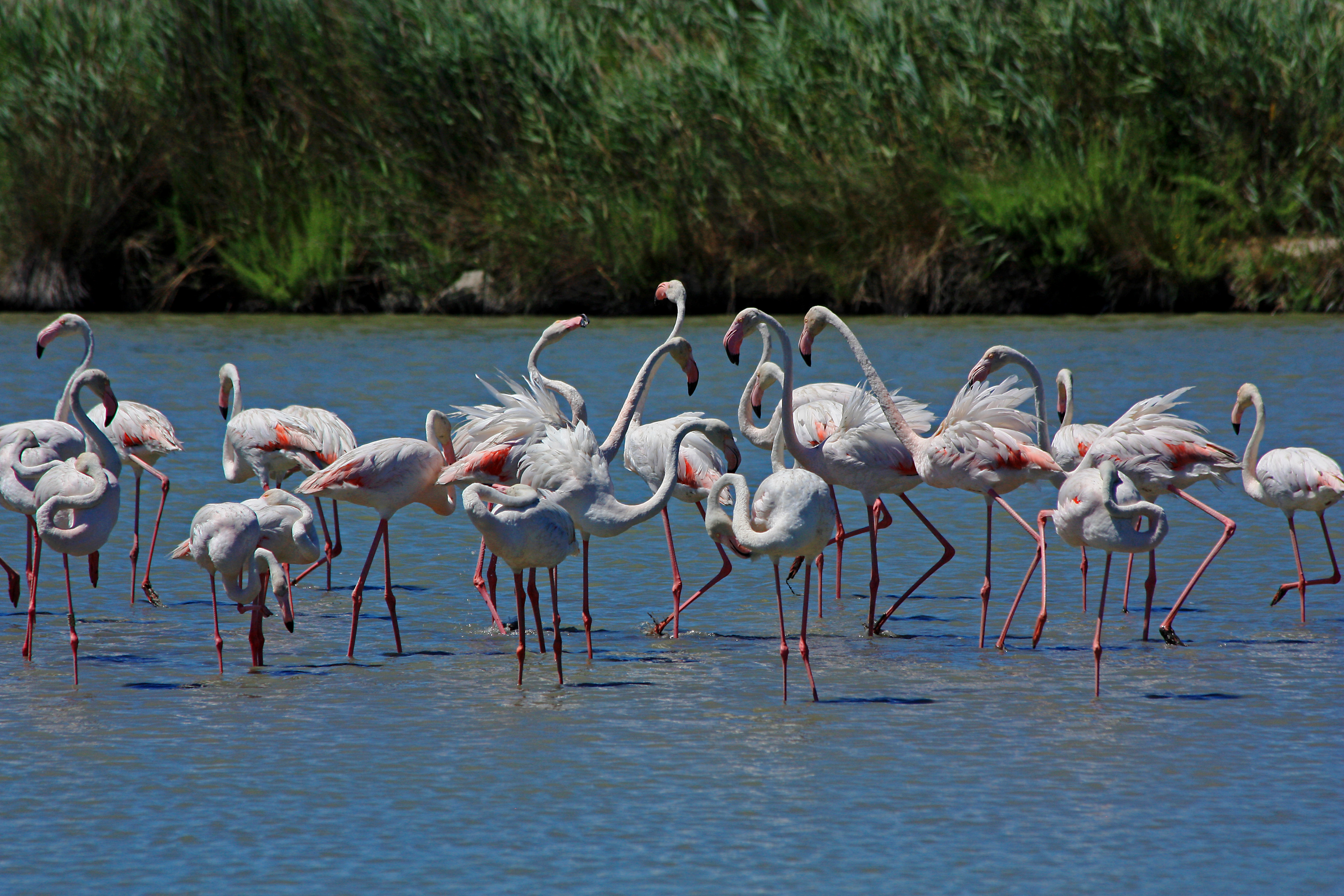
Species such as the green sea turtle, red fox, dalmatian pelican, common bottlenose dolphin and greater flamingo thrive in the Albanian Adriatic Sea Coast.

In terms of phytogeography, the Albanian Adriatic Sea Coast belongs to the Illyrian province of the Circumboreal Region within the Boreal Kingdom. It falls entirely within the Illyrian deciduous forests terrestrial ecoregion of the Palearctic Mediterranean forests, woodlands, and scrub biome. The special environmental circumstances and the millennial human activity on the territory of the coast determine the rich variety of species, populations and ecosystems, many of which are with conservation significance.

The Albanian Adriatic portion features contrasting vegetation types that are impacted by different factors. The woodlands are mostly dominated by evergreen forests with associated broadleaved sclerophyllous evergreen trees and shrubs primarily found in the southern section of the coastline. The forests ranges from mixed broadleaf forests, at lower elevations, to conifer forests, at higher elevations. The pine forms an important natural feature within the coastline, distributed across Velipoja, Shëngjin, Patok and Rodon, which in turn provide habitat for a vast array of wildlife.

Stretching in the southeastern Adriatic Sea, the coast with a variety of habitats makes for a birdwatching location during peak migration with several wetlands, estuaries and hills provides diversity for both resident and migrant birds. Maybe the most iconic bird of the coast is the vulnerable and extremely rare dalmatian pelican. It breeds on inland lakes and coastal lagoons of Albania such as in Karavasta and Patoku Lagoon. The greater flamingo is another prominent species that live in the region. It is the largest species of flamingos and widespread in Karavasta and Narta Lagoon.

The coast is famous for wildlife watching and nesting sea turtles are one of the region's highlights. Its beaches provide nesting sites for several species of endangered sea turtles, namely the hawksbill, leatherback, green sea and loggerhead sea turtle. As well as turtles, the sea life consist of several species of sharks, dolphins and whales. The cuvier's beaked whale and sperm whale are common along the coast. The dolphin species found along the entire coastline are represented by the striped dolphin, risso's dolphin and common bottlenose dolphin.

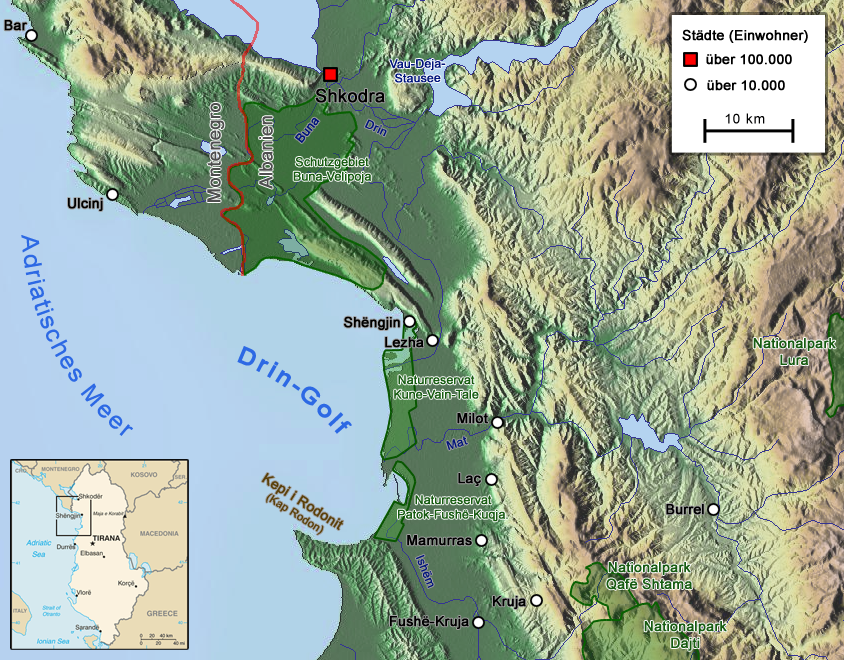
Drin Gulf and its associated protected areas along the coast

The vast and diverse coast is home to an incredibly rich diversity of mammals. Most famous of the carnivores is the rare golden jackal that occurs mostly on the coast of the ravines of the rivers. Another notorious might be the red fox, which occurs throughout the forested and coastal areas in the northern section of the coast. Other mammals include the brown bear, wild boar, chamois and grey wolf. The sea, lagoons and river deltas are extremely rich in salt and fresh water fish. Some aquatic and abundant animals include the european sea sturgeon, starry sturgeon, twait shad and adriatic sturgeon, which is perhaps the most famous species to become extinct in the Adriatic Sea.

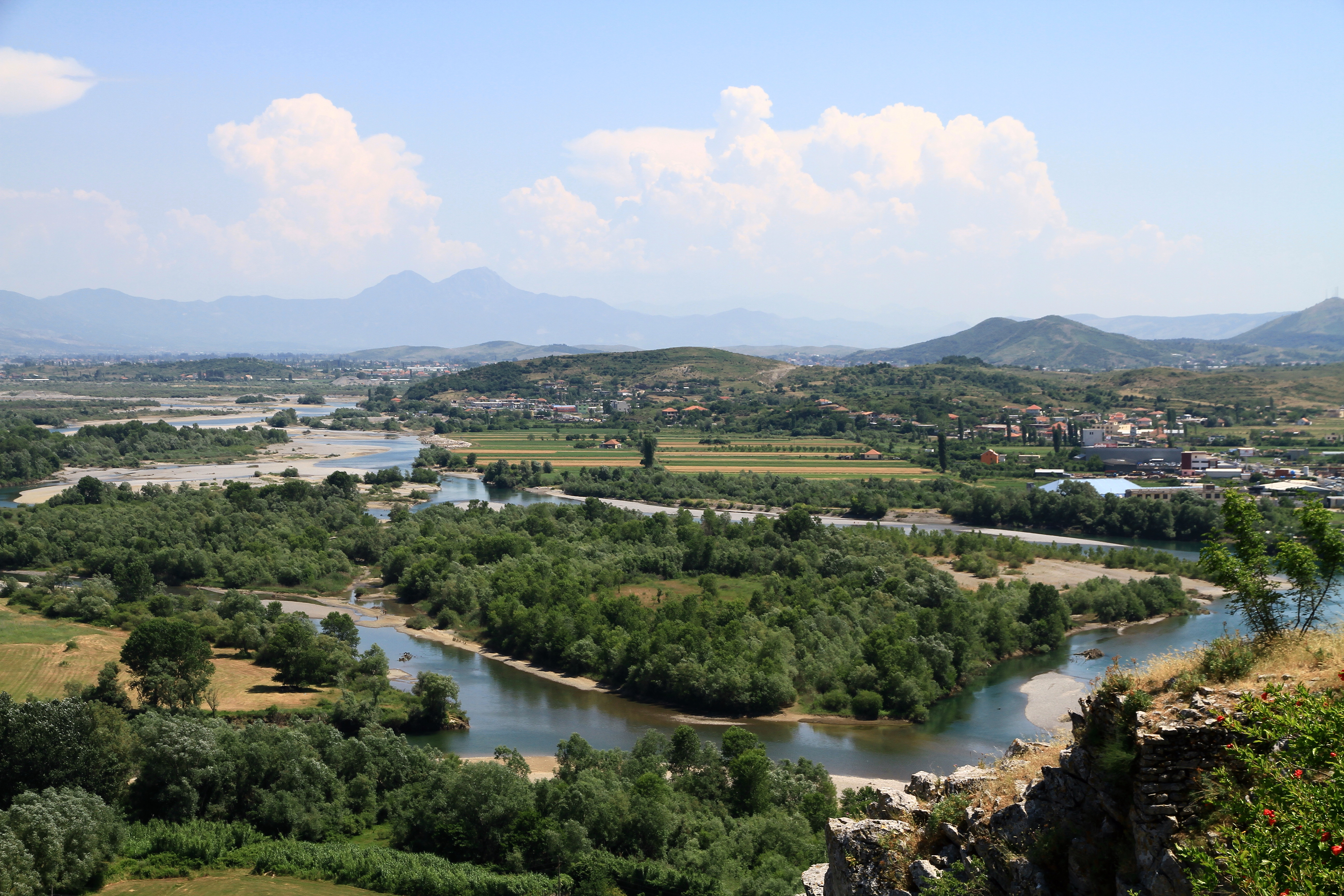
The catchment area of Drin is classified as one of the most important biodiversity hotspots in Europe.

The protected areas of Albania are a biodiversity treasure, containing a wide range of geographical and climatic diversity. Different categories of protected areas have been established alongside the coast. Divjakë-Karavasta National Park, the only national park in the Albanian Adriatic coast, is very picturesque and harbors several endangered species, that makes it a very popular place indeed.

Encompassing the Drin River estuary, the Kunë-Vain-Tale Nature Park is an undisturbed natural area of wet grasslands, swamps and lagoons at the direct proximity to the Adriatic Sea. The Vjosa, considered to be Europe's last wild river, discharges, north of Narta, into the Adriatic Sea, where it forms the Vjosa-Narta Protected Landscape. Both the Karavasta Lagoon and Lake Shkodër are classified as wetlands of international importance by designation under the Ramsar Convention.

Important Bird Areas are important sites for bird conservation and their habitats, as they provide suitable conditions to birds. Currently, 16 important bird areas have been identified throughout the territory of Albania, amongst them the Drin Delta near Shkodër, the Vlorë Bay, that is bordered by Karaburun-Sazan Marine Park, and the lagoons of Patoku, Karavasta and Narta, that are among the largest and most important coastal wetlands of the Balkans, due to its varied biodiversity and one of the top sites for wintering and migratory birds in the country.

=== Climate ===
Apart from the considerable variation in landscape, it makes for a wide range of climate types. The Adriatic Sea in the west, Albanian Alps in the north and Ceraunian Mountains in the south have a great influence to the climate of the area. As defined by the Köppen climate classification, the Albanian Adriatic Sea Coast experiences a mediterranean climate with considerable maritime and subtropical influences. This means that the summers are hot, sometimes very hot and dry and the winters generally mild and wet. The coast experiences four distinct seasons. The winter is relatively humid and mild, and the summer lasts very long and is usually hot and dry. Autumn and spring are transitional seasons.

Winds in the Adriatic Sea change their direction and speed during a year period as a result of the distinctive mediterranean climate. This characteristic is mainly determined by a passing trajectory of basic systems across the Mediterranean Sea and Balkan Peninsula as well as other important factors such as morphometric characteristics of the territory.

Climate data for Durrës
| Month | Jan | Feb | Mar | Apr | May | Jun | Jul | Aug | Sep | Oct | Nov | Dec | Year |
|---|---|---|---|---|---|---|---|---|---|---|---|---|---|
| Mean daily maximum °C (°F) | 11.4 (52.5) | 12.5 (54.5) | 14.9 (58.8) | 18.3 (64.9) | 22.6 (72.7) | 26.5 (79.7) | 28.7 (83.7) | 28.8 (83.8) | 26.0 (78.8) | 21.4 (70.5) | 16.6 (61.9) | 13.3 (55.9) | 20.1 (68.1) |
| Daily mean °C (°F) | 8.1 (46.6) | 9.0 (48.2) | 10.9 (51.6) | 14.0 (57.2) | 18.1 (64.6) | 21.8 (71.2) | 23.8 (74.8) | 23.9 (75.0) | 21.2 (70.2) | 17.2 (63.0) | 13.0 (55.4) | 9.9 (49.8) | 15.9 (60.6) |
| Mean daily minimum °C (°F) | 4.8 (40.6) | 5.6 (42.1) | 6.9 (44.4) | 9.7 (49.5) | 13.6 (56.5) | 17.2 (63.0) | 19.0 (66.2) | 19.0 (66.2) | 16.5 (61.7) | 13.0 (55.4) | 9.5 (49.1) | 6.5 (43.7) | 11.8 (53.2) |
| Average precipitation mm (inches) | 132 (5.2) | 107 (4.2) | 99 (3.9) | 81 (3.2) | 68 (2.7) | 41 (1.6) | 26 (1.0) | 36 (1.4) | 71 (2.8) | 112 (4.4) | 160 (6.3) | 131 (5.2) | 1,064 (41.9) |

== Economy ==
=== Tourism ===
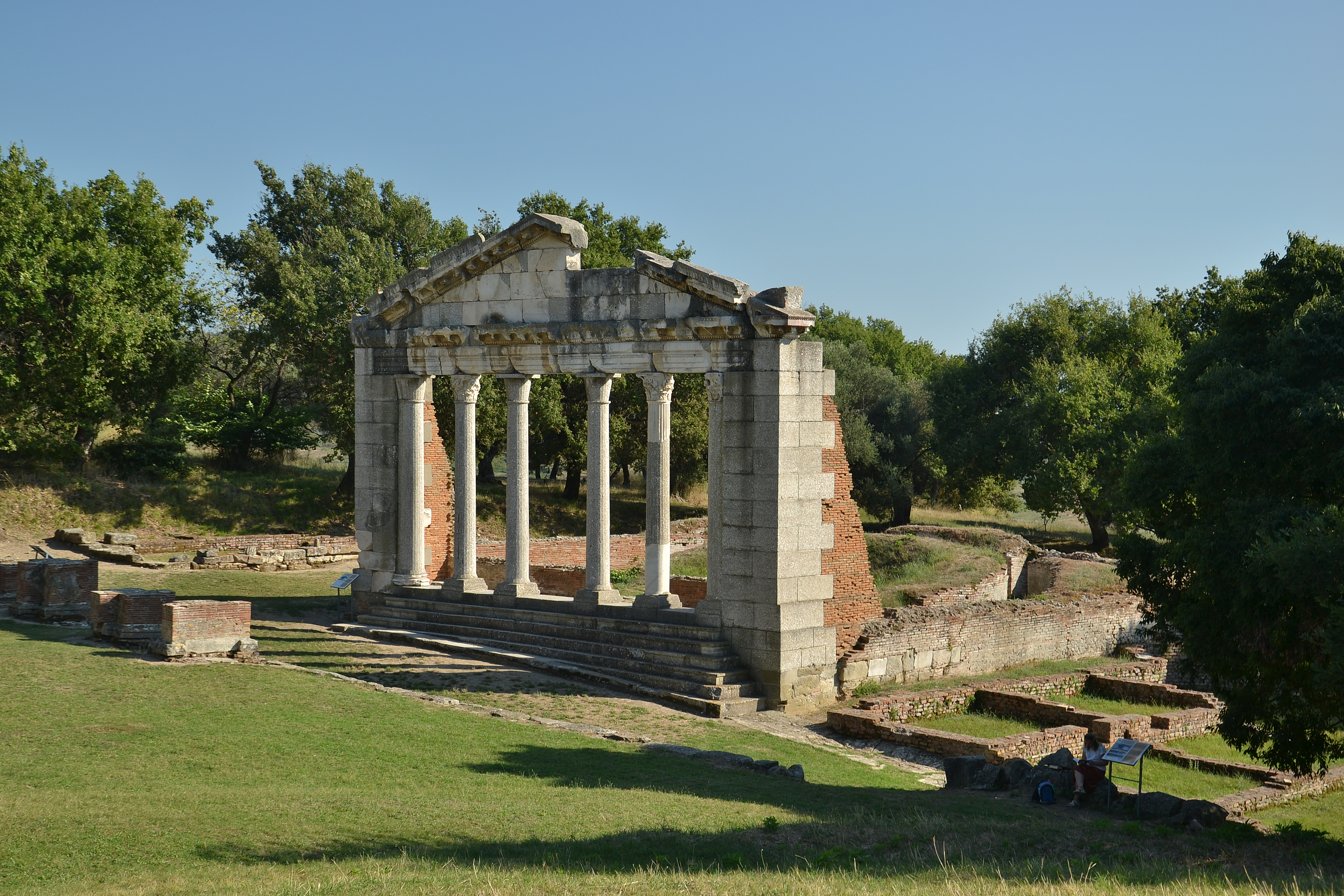
The architectural heritage of Apollonia attracts hundreds of tourists.

Tourism is considered one of the largest industries in the economy of Albania. It has significantly increased since following the fall of communism in the country. The country has a rich historical and cultural heritage and natural beauty varying from clear turquoise waters fringed by sandy and rocky beaches to contrasting mountainous interior. The coastline has a well-preserved natural ecosystem that can boast a unique combination of a diverse climate and landscape.

As Albania extends over the Adriatic flyway, birdwatching is recently gaining in popularity, due to the interest shown by visitors from other countries. The coastline has a lot to offer fr both visiting and resident bird watchers. The extensive wetlands, with many different Mediterranean and European species, contains many significant birding sites throughout the year. The lagoons in Karavasta, Patoku, Narta and various other protected areas are just a few examples of popular birdwatching destinations.

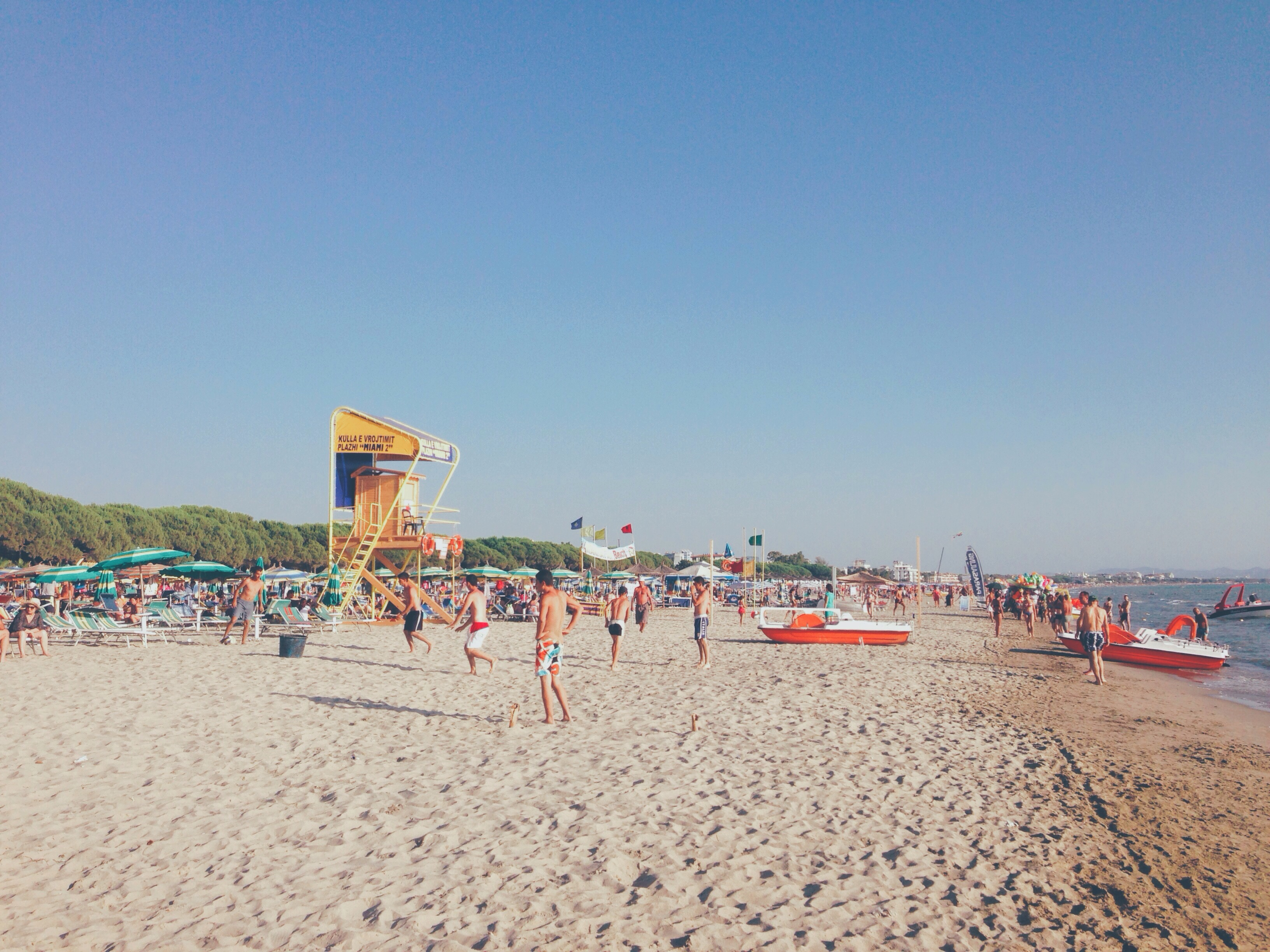
Golem beach south of Durrës is a popular summer retreat

Beach vacations, particularly for domestic and foreign visitors from different countries, are also central to the local tourism industry. Most beach resorts are located especially along the coastline of Durrës and Vlorë. The southern coastline of Durrës are renowned for its traditional mass tourism, which have experienced an uncontrolled urban development. In contrast, the northern coastline are mostly unspoiled and set to become an elite tourism destination. In addition, the area is gaining international attention through the organization of music festivals such as the UNUM International Music Festival in Rana e Hedhun, Shengjin.

The heritage tourism is focussed on specific interest on the history of Albania, such as the architectural heritage of ancient civilizations such as the Illyrians, Ancient Greeks and Romans in Albania. Besides the churches, mosques, forts and historical buildings, the most popular heritage tourism attractions are the remains of the ancient city of Apollonia, the ancient fortress of Rozafa and the amphitheatre of Durrës.

=== Transport ===
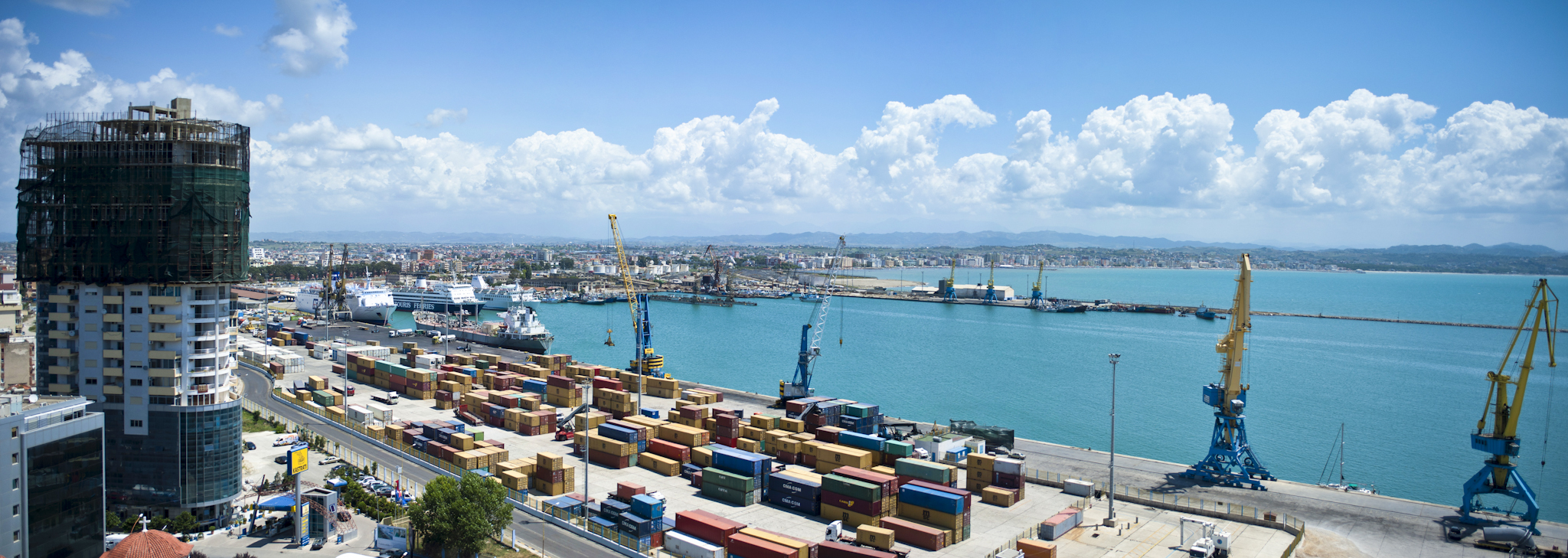
Panorama of the Port of Durrës.

The Albanian Adriatic Sea Coast is home to the three largest seaports of the country. The largest cargo ports among them is the Port of Durrës, one of the largest in the Adriatic Sea, with annual passenger volume of approximately 1.5 million. The other seaports include Vlorë and Shëngjin. In addition, the ports serve a wide system of ferries, connecting numerous islands and coastal cities in addition to ferry lines to several cities in Croatia, Greece and Italy.

Yachting is pretty recent in the country and less developed than in other countries within the Mediterranean Sea. Porto Albania will be after its complementation, the first marina destination in Albania for both national and international yachting and charter. It will be located between the city of Durrës and the national park of Divjakë-Karavasta.

== See also ==
- Adriatic Sea
- Geography of Albania
- Biodiversity of Albania
- Important Bird Areas in Albania
- Albanian Ionian Sea Coast
