= Gulf of Drin =

Inlet of the Adriatic Sea in the northern coast of Albania

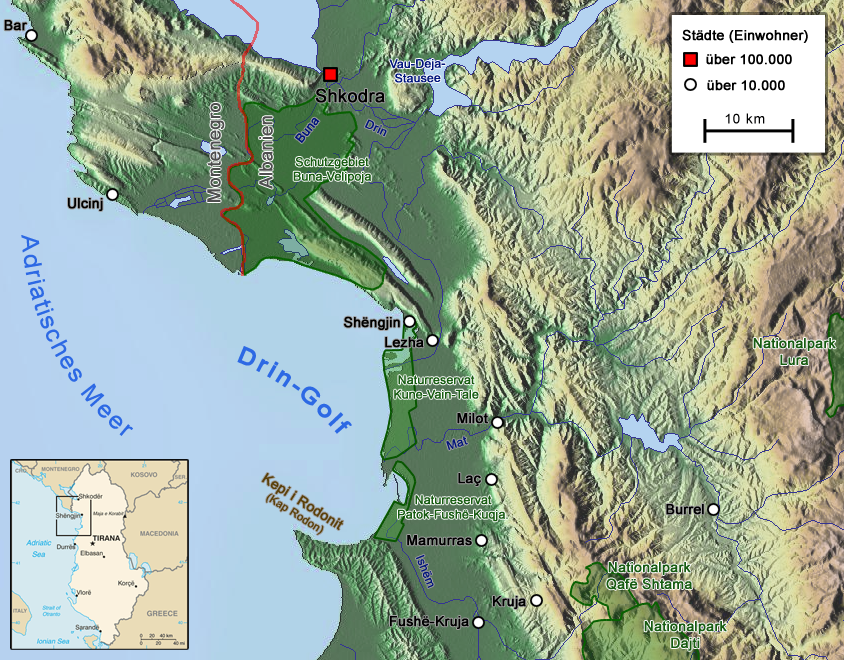
- Map of the Gulf of Drin
- Interactive map of Gulf of Drin
- Location: Albania, Southern Europe
- Coordinates: 41°44′0″N 19°30′0″E
- River sources: Drin River
- Ocean/sea sources: Adriatic Sea, Mediterranean Sea
- Basin countries: Albania
- Settlements: Shëngjin

The Gulf of Drin or Bay of Drin (Albanian: Gjiri i Drinit or Pellgu i Drinit) is an ocean basin of the Adriatic Sea within the Mediterranean Sea along the northern coast of Albania. Roughly scythe-shaped, it extends immediately from the Delta of the Buna in the north, across the port city of Shëngjin, to the Cape of Rodon in the south. The shoreline of the gulf is a shallow combination of sandy beaches, sand dunes, capes, salty and fresh water wetlands, estuaries, pine and coastal forests, reed beds and coastal meadows.

The shoreline of the gulf has a length of approximately 60 kilometres and is dotted with cliffs and beaches fed by fluvial imputes. The region is drained by numerous rivers and has formed a characteristic ecosystem and biodiversity. It is named after the Drin River that runs through a mountainous area towards the coast, however, the Ishëm and Mat also drain into the gulf. In consideration to the flat landscape, the gulf's shoreline are dotted with extensive wetlands and lagoons that continuously change in size and shape.

The biodiversity of the gulf is relatively high and several protected areas have been established along the coasts amongst them the Buna River-Velipoja Protected Landscape in the north, Kune-Vain Nature Reserve in the centre and Patoku-Fushë Kuqja Nature Reserve in the south. It is also classified as an Important Bird and Plant Area, because it supports numerous bird and plant species. The region lies mainly within the catchment area of the Drin that is officially recognized as an important biodiversity hotspot.

The gulf is one of the most important places in the Adriatic Sea for sea turtles. Its beaches are nesting and foraging grounds for 2 important and endangered species of sea turtles including the green sea and loggerhead sea turtle. Apart from the famous endangered sea turtles, which are to be found in almost all the coasts, it hosts whales such as the cuvier's beaked whale and dolphins amongst them the striped dolphin, risso's dolphin and common bottlenose dolphin.

== See also ==
- Albanian Adriatic Sea Coast
- Biodiversity of Albania
- Geography of Albania
- Protected areas of Albania
