= Ishull Lezhë =

Neighborhood in Lezhë, Albania

- Village
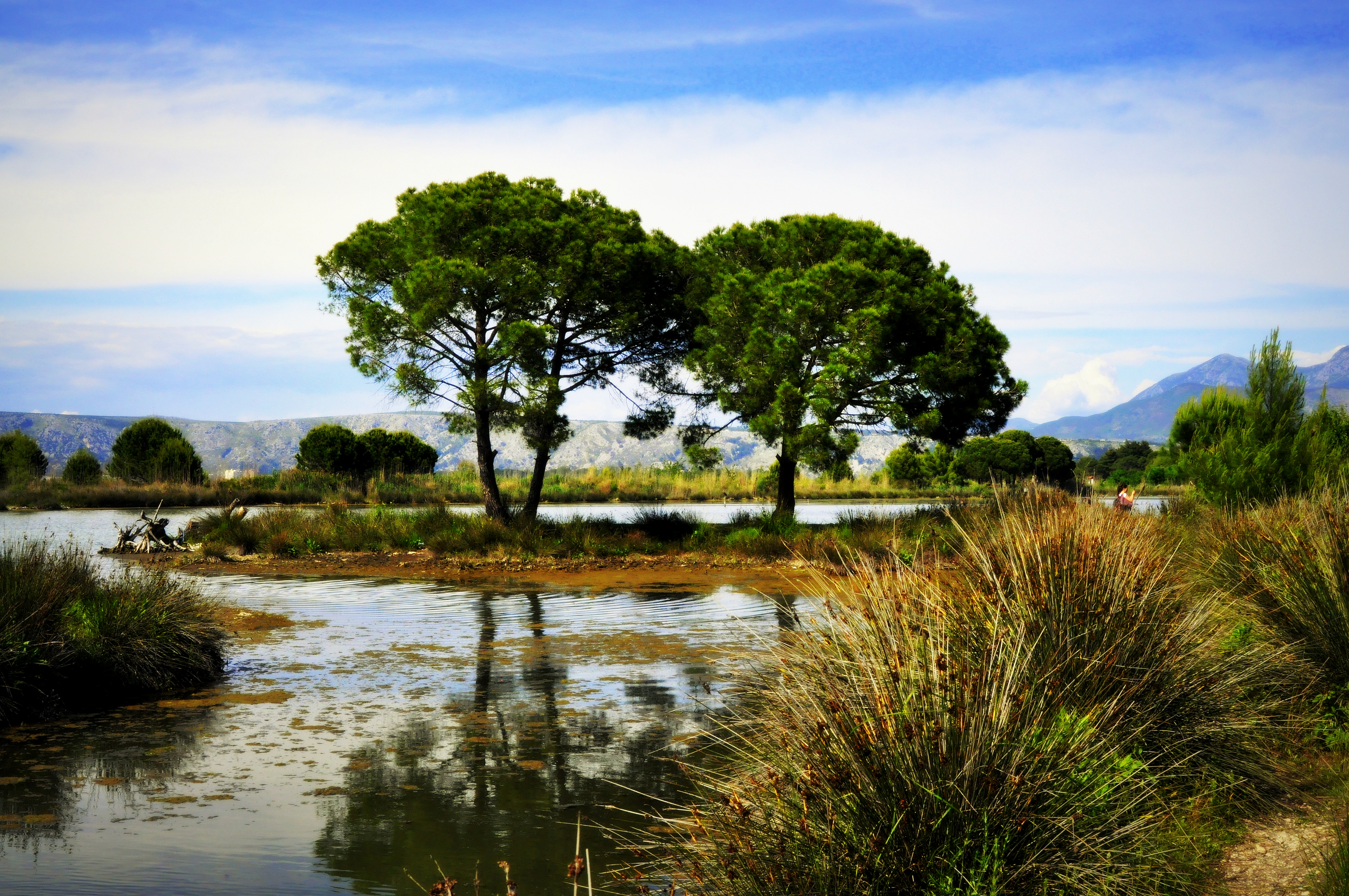
- Nature in Ishull Lezhë

- Location within Albania
- Coordinates: 41°45′56″N 19°38′21″E
- Country: Albania
- County: Lezhë
- Municipality: Lezhë
- Administrative unit: Shëngjin
- Time zone: UTC+1 (CET)
  - Summer (DST): UTC+2 (CEST)
- Postal Code: 4503

Ishull Lezhë is a settlement in the Lezhë County, northwestern Albania. It is part of the former municipality Shëngjin. At the 2015 local government reform it became part of the municipality of Lezhë. The Mataj family is the most known in the district having lived there for approximately 3 centuries.
