= List of Important Bird Areas in Albania =

There are 16 Important Bird Areas (IBAs) designated for Albania. The following is a list of Important Bird Areas in the country.

| Image | Name | IBA Criteria | Site Code |
|---|---|---|---|
| | Lake Shkodër | A1, A4i, A4iii, B1i | AL001 |
| | Lake Ohrid | A1, A4i, A4iii, B1i | AL002 |
| | Lake Prespa | A1, A4i, B1i | AL003 |
| | Small Lake Prespa | A1 | AL004 |
| | Narta Lagoon | A1, A4i, A4iii, B1i | AL005 |
| | Karavasta Lagoon | A1, A4i, A4iii, B1i, B2 | AL006 |
| | Drin Delta | A1, A4i, B1i | AL007 |
| | Theth | B2 | AL008 |
| | Lurë | B2 | AL009 |
| | Vlora Bay, Karaburun Peninsula and Cika Mountain | B2 | AL010 |
| | Marash Mountains | B2 | AL011 |
| | Lake Butrint | B2 | AL012 |
| | Velipojë | A1 | AL013 |
| | Patoku Lagoon | A1, A4i, B1i | AL014 |
| | Lalzi Bay | B1i | AL015 |
| | Gjirokastër | A1, A4i, B1iii | AL016 |
