= Kunë Island =

Island in Albania

Kune Island
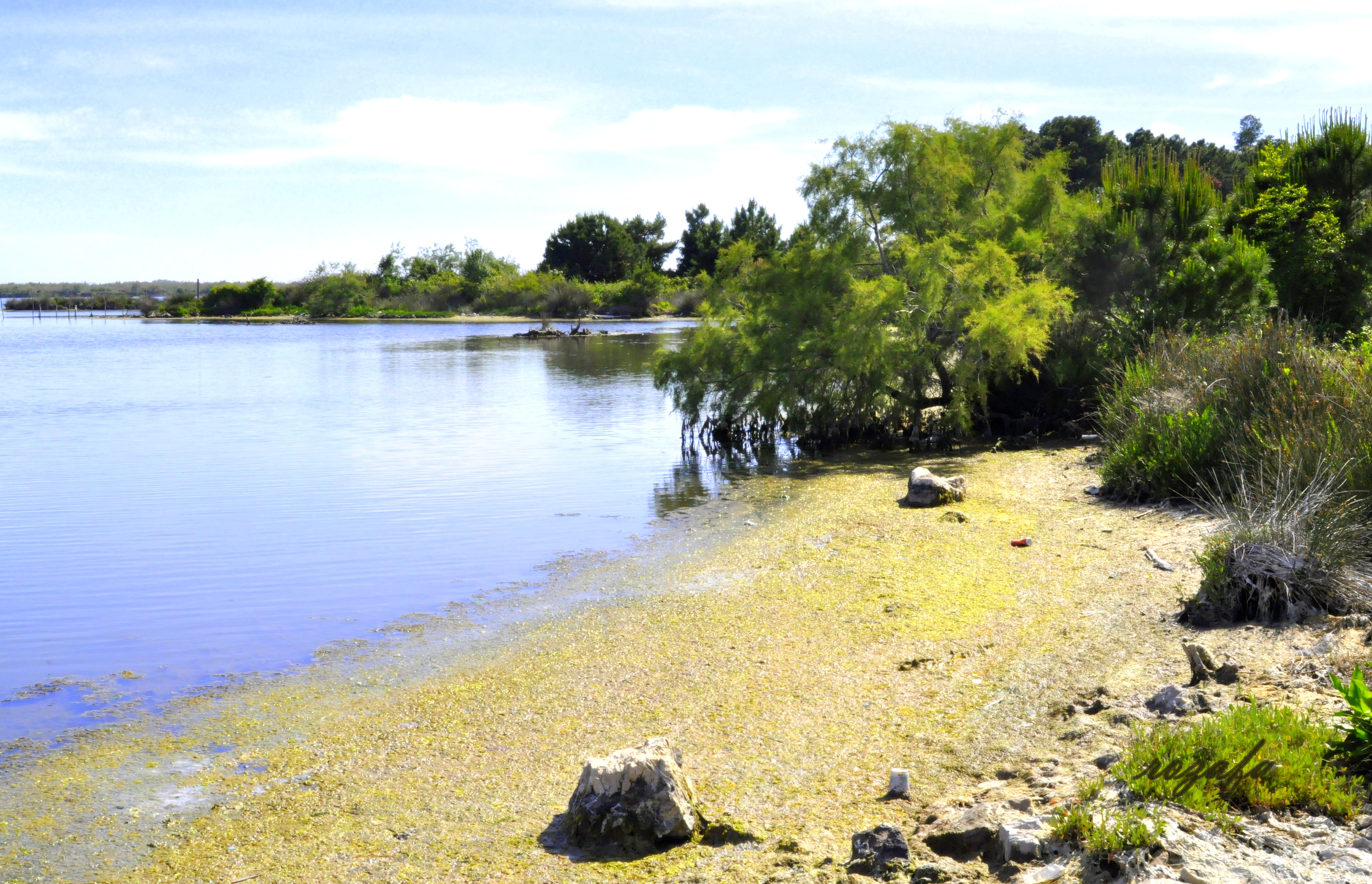
- Landscape around the island

- Location within Albania

Geography
- Location: Lagoon of Merxhan
- Coordinates: 41°45′47″N 19°34′54″E
- Area: 1.4 km^{2} (0.54 sq mi)
- Area rank: 2nd
- Highest elevation: 5 m (16 ft)

Administration
- Albania
- County: Lezhë County
- Municipality: Shëngjin

Kune Island (Albanian: Ishulli i Kunes) is an island located off the coast of Albania in the Adriatic Sea. The island lies in the delta of the river Drin near the city of Lezha and has an area of 1.4 square kilometres (0.5 sq mi). The island is 1.5 kilometres (0.9 miles) from the coast. Kune island features extravagant and varied plant life, including plants such as small Mediterranean shrubs to ash and willow forests. Wildlife is abundant as well. The island is home to around seventy species of birds, twenty-two species of reptiles, six species of amphibians and twenty-three species of mammals.

Nearby are the beaches of Tale and Kune which goes by the same name.

== See also ==
- Kunë-Vain-Tale Nature Reserve
