= Singin =

Singin may refer to:

- Singin'..., a 1977 album by Melissa Manchester
- Singin, the Ottoman name for Shëngjin, Albania
- Singing
