= Kunë-Vain-Talë-Patok-Fushëkuqe-Ishëm Nature Park =

Nature park in Lezhë County and a tourist attraction in Albania

- IUCN category IV (habitat/species management area)
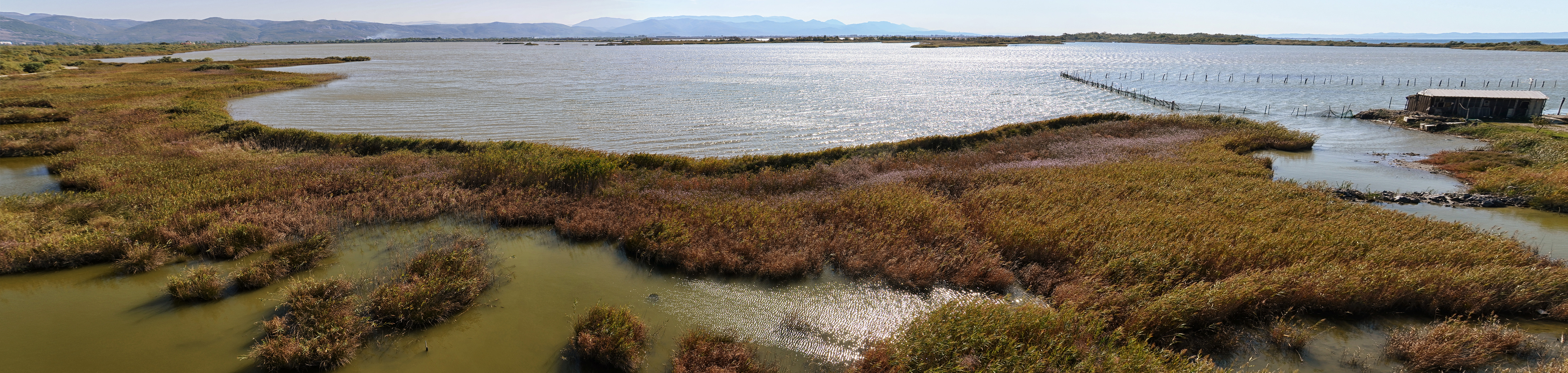
- Kunë-Vain-Tale Nature Park
- Interactive map of Kunë-Vain-Talë-Patok-Fushëkuqe-Ishëm Nature Park
- Location: Lezhë County
- Nearest city: Lezhë, Shëngjin
- Coordinates: 41°45′0″N 19°36′0″E
- Area: 4,393 ha (43.93 km^{2})
- Designation: Nature Reserve
- Established: 28 April 2010
- Governing body: National Agency of Protected Areas
- Website: kunevain.com

The Kunë-Vain-Talë-Patok-Fushëkuqe-Ishëm Nature Reserve (Albanian: Rezervati Kunë-Vain-Tale) is a nature park located within the Lezhë County forming the Drin river delta and facing the Adriatic Sea in northern Albania. It spans an area of 43.93 km^{2} (16.96 sq mi). The area is the first protected area to be established in Albania as a hunting reserve in July 1940. The current nature reserve was established in 2010 encompassing the Kunë Island, the Kunë-Vain lagoon, the woodlands, and several ecosystems. Notably, it has been also identified as an Important Bird Area by BirdLife International.

The Kunë-Vain-Tale falls within the Illyrian deciduous forests and Mediterranean woodlands and forests terrestrial ecoregion of the Palearctic temperate broadleaf and mixed forests biome. The climate is typically mediterranean. The nature reserve is characterized by its high vegetation and biodiversity. There are approximately 277 species of plants. The fauna is represented by 341 species; 23 species of mammals, 196 species of birds, 10 species of amphibia, 59 species of insects and 58 species of fish.

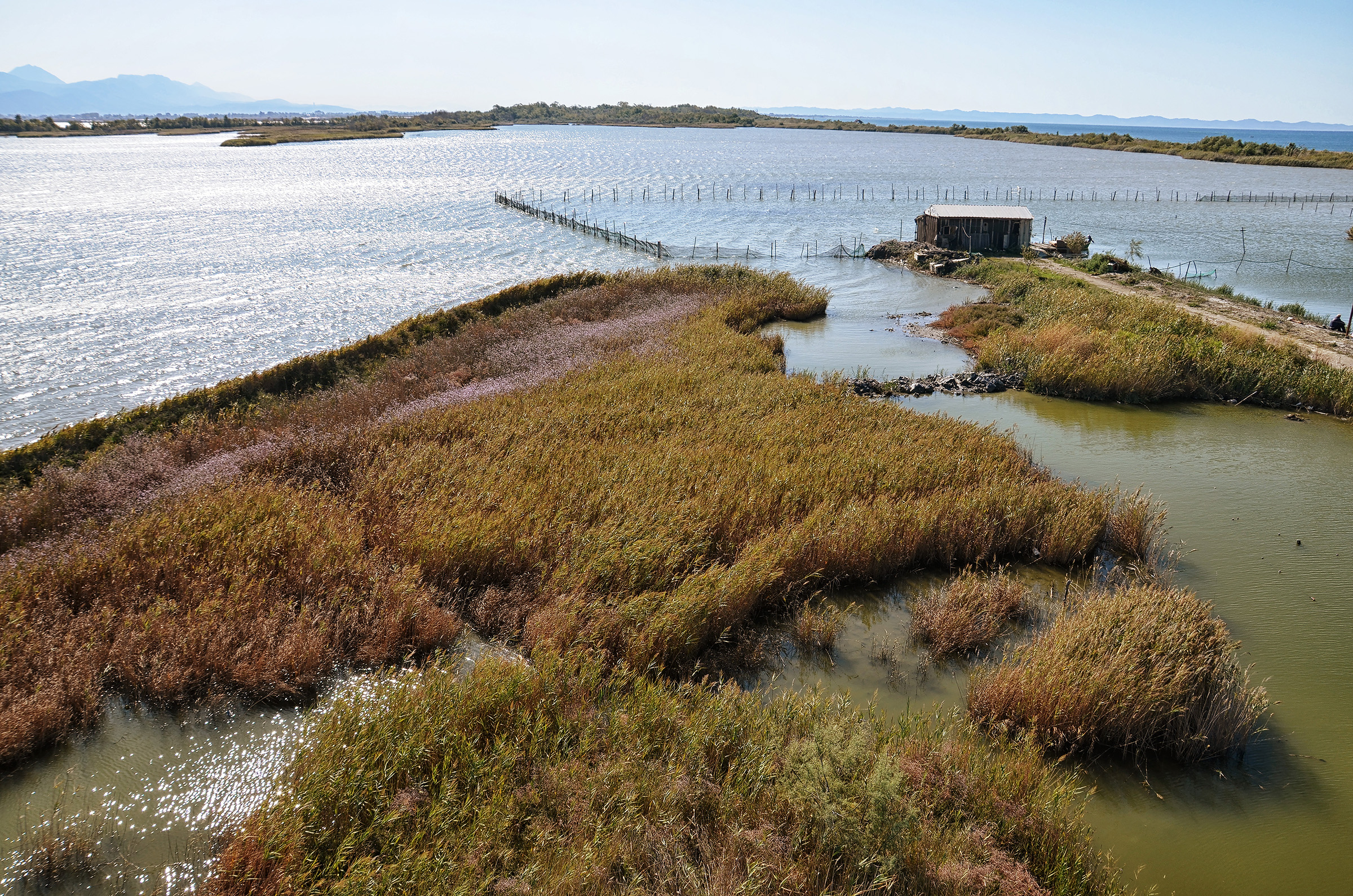
Kunë-Vain Lagoon

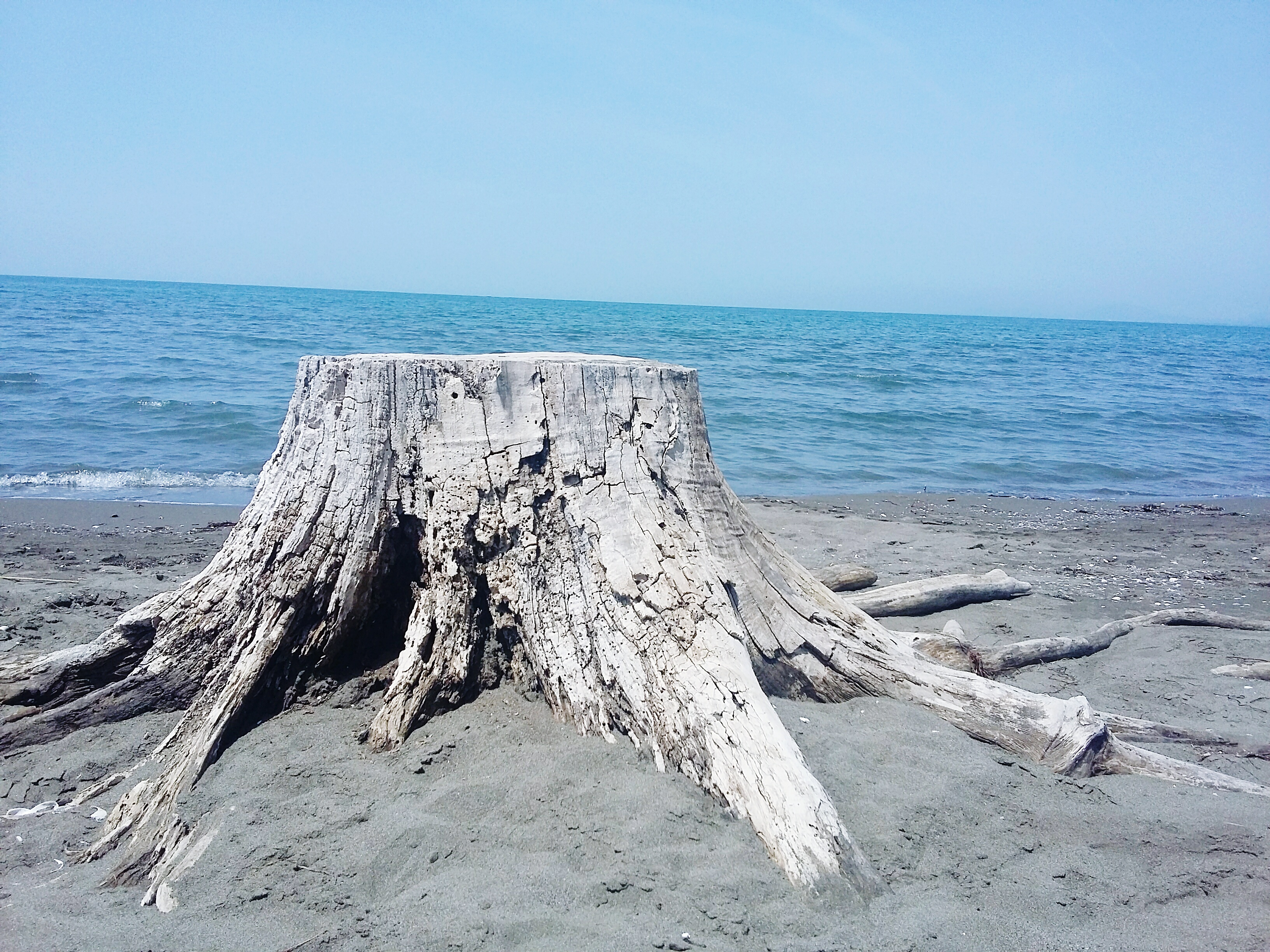
Beach within the nature park

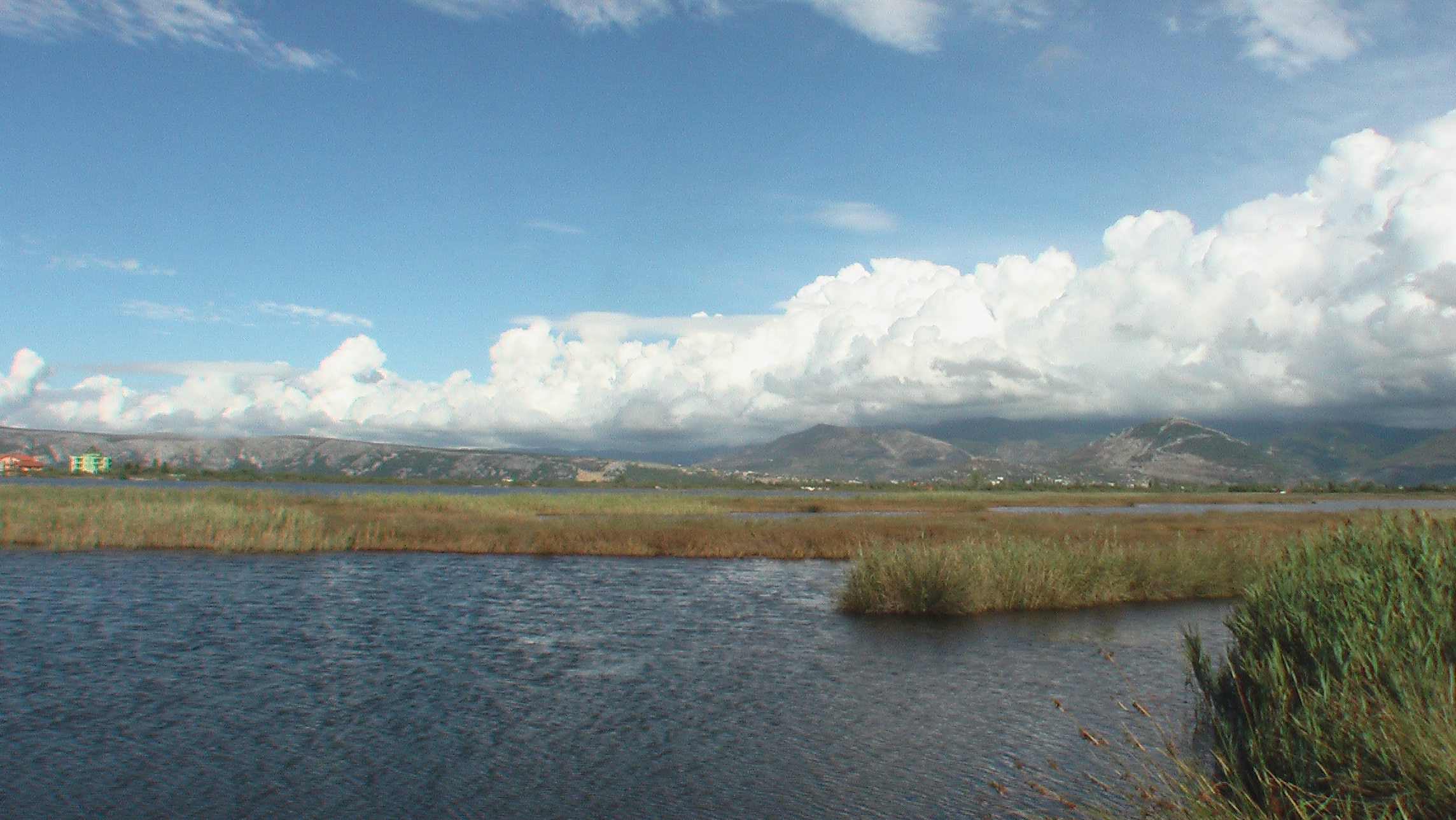
Kunë-Vain Lagoon

== See also ==
- Protected areas of Albania
- Geography of Albania
- Biodiversity of Albania
- Gulf of Drin
