= Patok Lagoon =

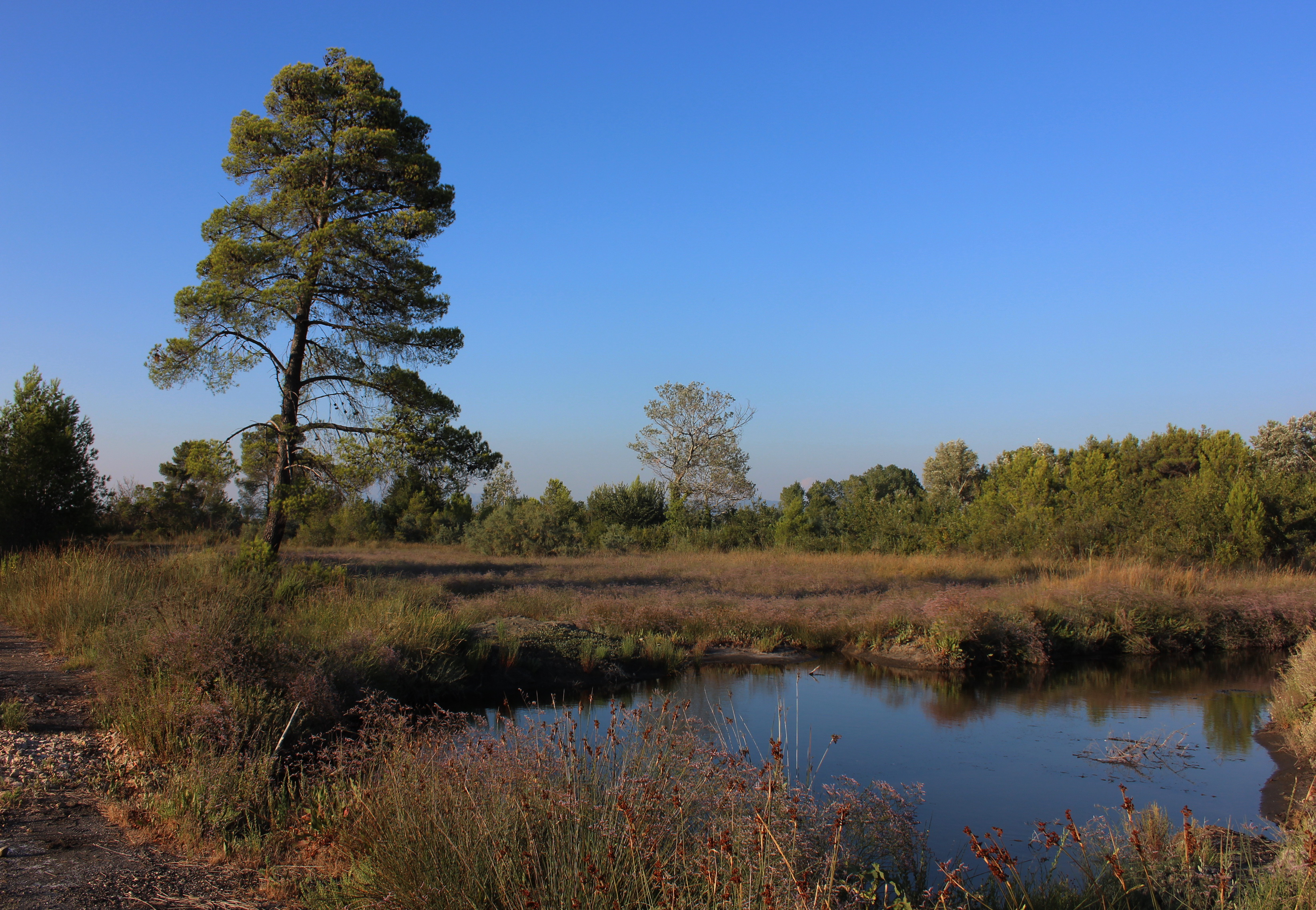
- View of the lagoon
- Interactive map of Patok Lagoon
- Location: Lezhë, Albania
- Coordinates: 41°37′44.4″N 19°35′27.6″E
- Established: 3 November 2011

Patok Lagoon (Albanian: Laguna e Patokut) is a lagoon of the Adriatic Sea on the Mediterranean Sea in the central coast of Albania.

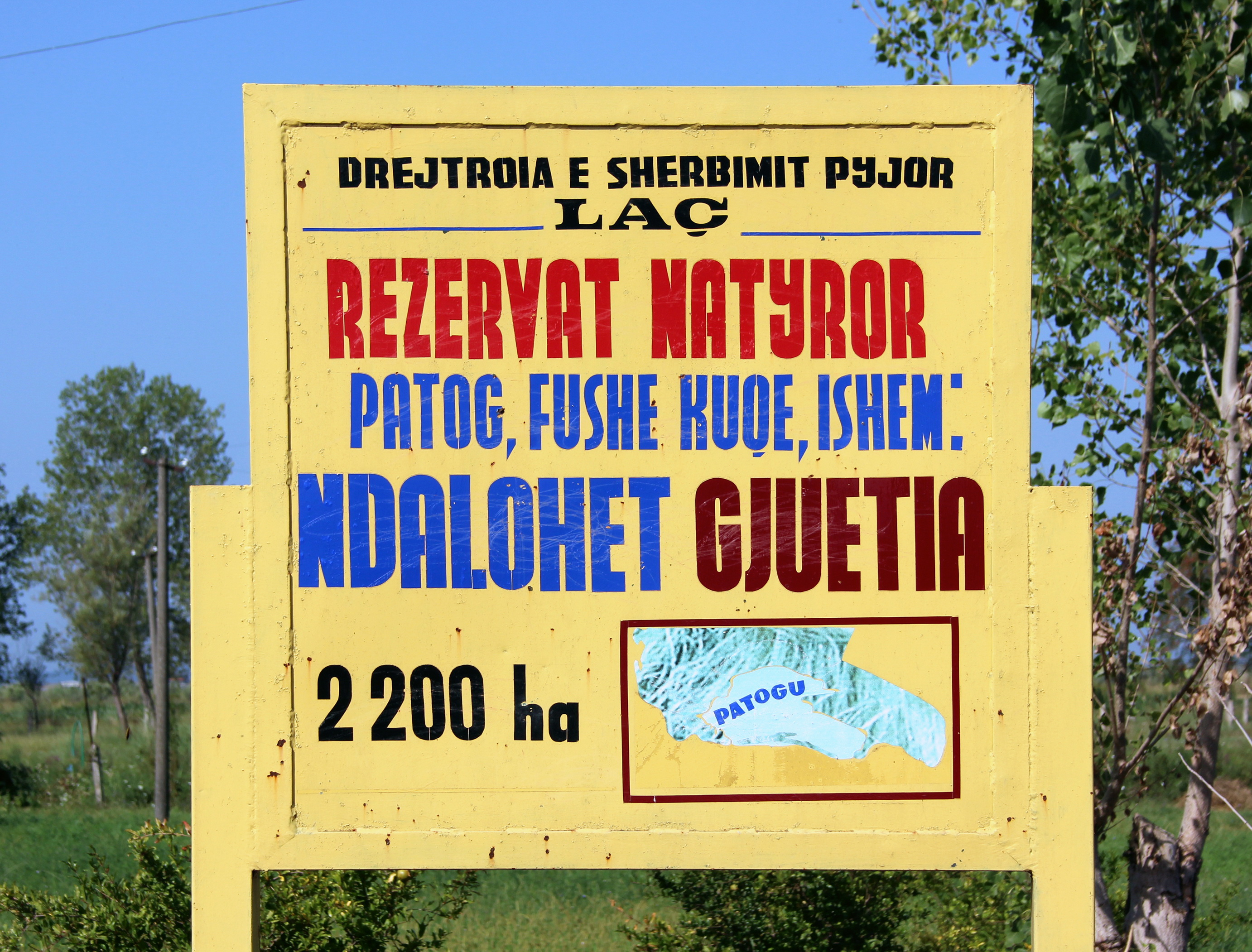
Patok-Fushe Kuqe-Ishem Nature Reserve

Created during the Holocene period, this area was characterized by a geo-morphologic dynamism. Its development spanned four phases, which correspond to the formation of four lagoons, separated by littoral cordons. The fourth lagoon is the current one. A fifth lagoon (the current outer lagoon) is in an active formation process, also influenced by a rapid development of the littoral cordon in the western part. The whole area is flat and characterized by an intensive tectonic process and numerous underground water bodies.

During the second half of the twentieth century, human activities played an important role in the changes of this ecosystem through activities such as drainage, dam construction and deforestation. The area's physical and geographical characteristics are the main basis for its development potential. It has a relatively mild winter and fresh summer. The sun shines for an average of 2,479 hours per year. The average annual temperature is 15.5 °C, and average annual rainfall is 1,463 centimetres (576 in).

== Biodiversity ==
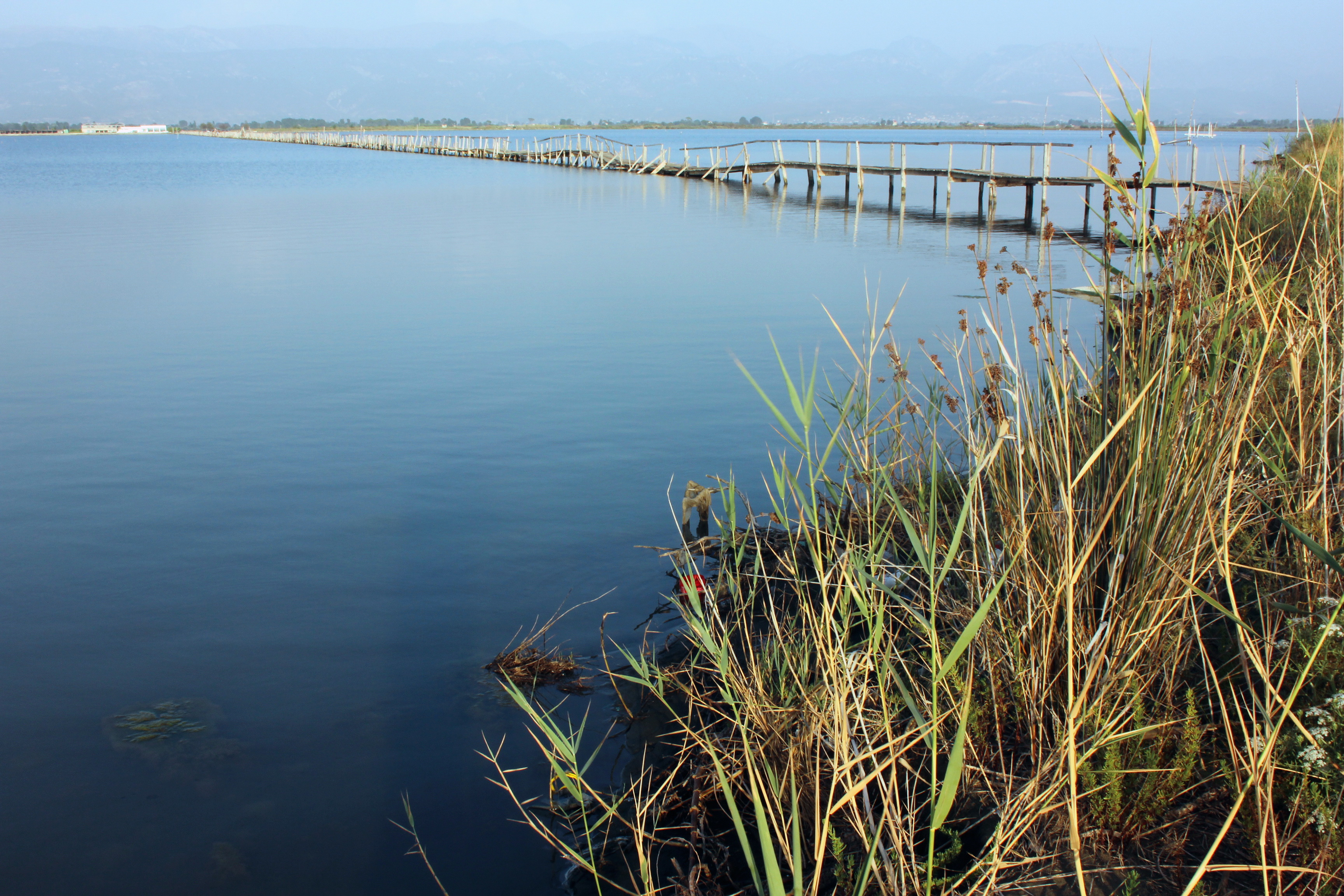
Flora in Patoku Lagoon

The physical characteristics and habitat diversity of the lagoon are closely related to the biodiversity of the wetland complex. The most common marine plants are the underwater meadows of fucus virsoides and posidonia oceanica. The vegetation is mainly characterized by microalgae, driven by nitrogen and phosphorus availability. One indicator of this condition is the large amount of diatoms.

The macrophages of the lagoon belong to chlorophyta and pheophyta. The grasslands of phanerogams cover about 40% of the lagoon. They are mainly zostera noltei, but in the shallow waters ruppia spiralis is found. This phytocoenosis has an important role in the lagoon.

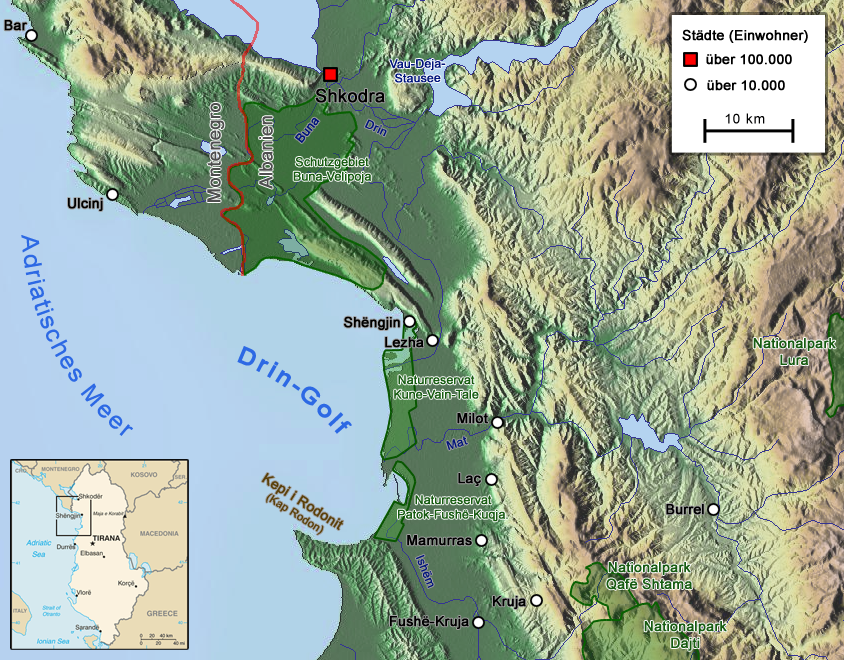
Patoku Lagoon part of the protected areas near Shengjin and Lezhe

The hygroscopic and hydrophilic vegetation covers a considerable area of the lagoon's peripheral parts. They are dominated by the three main associations of Phragmites, Typha and Scirpus.

Halophilous vegetation is most common in the northern and southern parts. This vegetation belongs to several associations, of which the most important are those with Arthrocaulon and Juncus.

The vegetation of the dunes is mainly found in the western part, with diverse species. The shores of the lagoon are dominated by Tamarix, Konopica Vitex and Rubus berries.

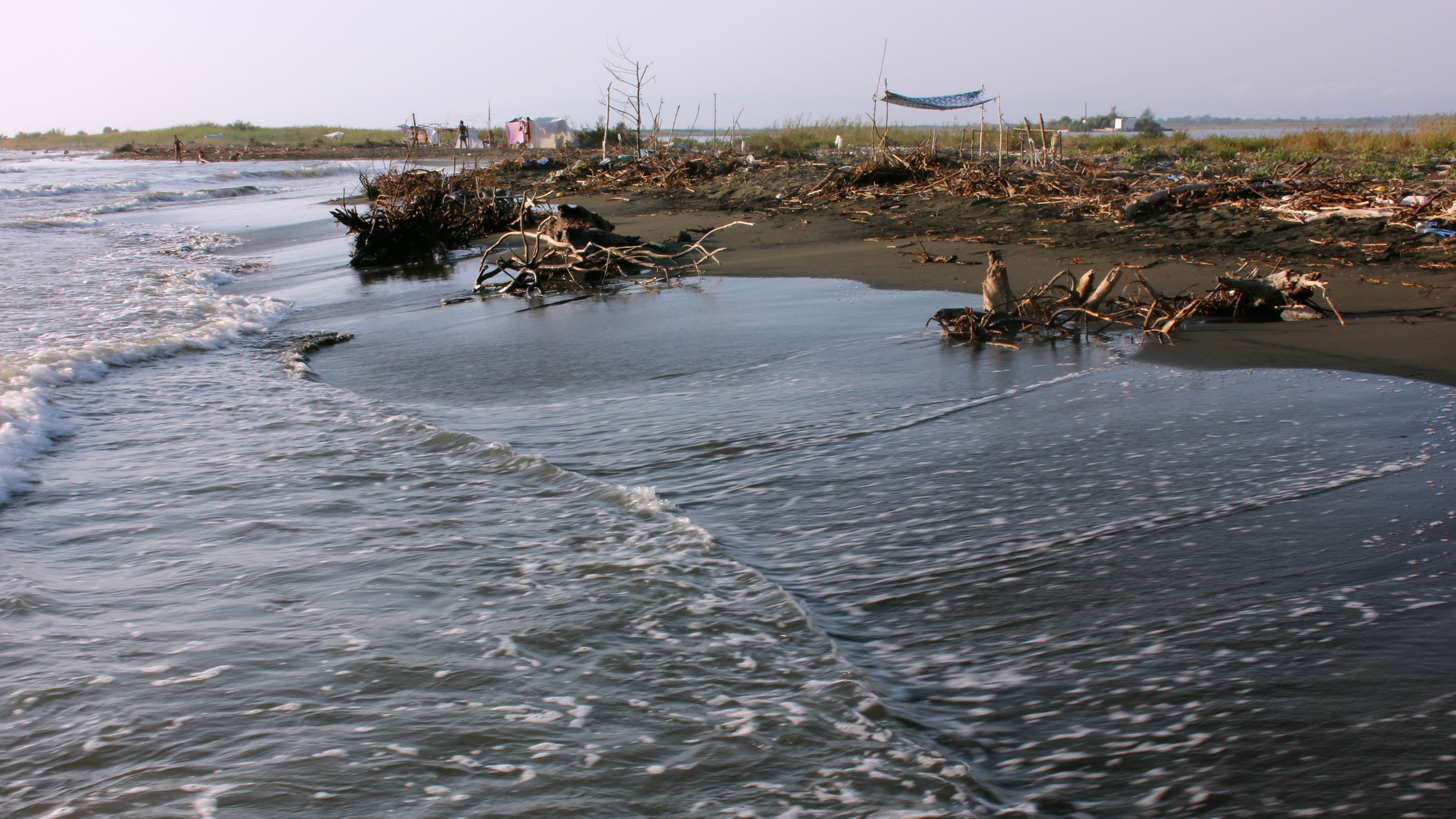
Along the coastline of the lagoon

The invertebrate fauna of the lagoon and its catchment basin—including surrounding freshwater bodies, canals, marshes, estuaries and shores—are characterized by a variety of groups and species, from molluscs to mammals to crabs and insects. Many fish species are of economic interest.

Amphibians and reptiles are found more in forests, swamps and canyons around the lagoon. Many Caretta water turtles live on the shore near the lagoon and the green turtle Chelonia mydas is also present.

== See also ==
- Geography of Albania
- Protected areas of Albania
- Albanian Adriatic Sea Coast
