= Shëngjin =

- Administrative unit
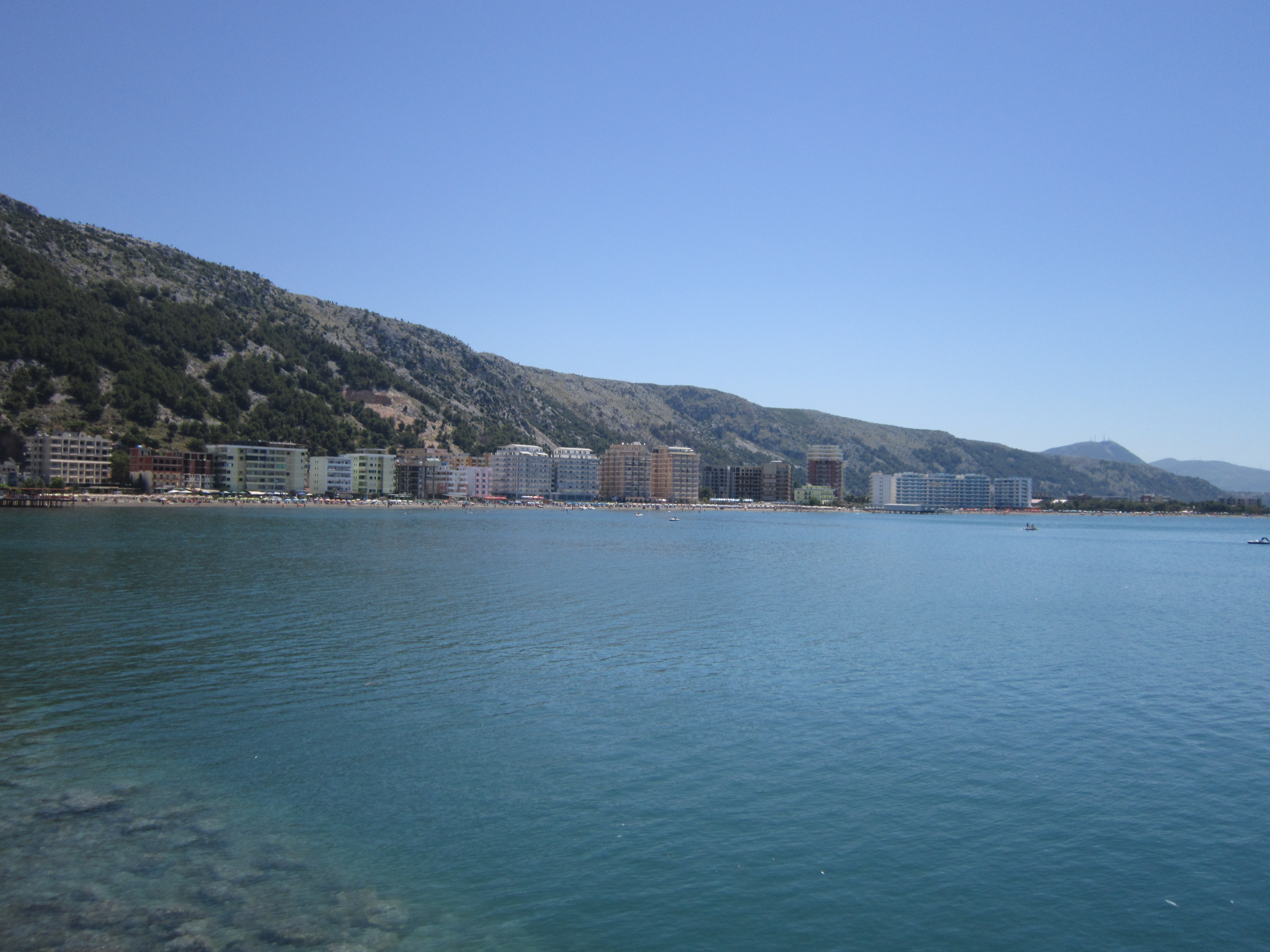
- Shengjin waterfront

- Location within Albania
- Coordinates: 41°48′49″N 19°35′38″E
- Country: Albania
- County: Lezhë
- Municipality: Lezhë
  - Administrative unit: 53.4 km^{2} (20.6 sq mi)
- Elevation: 0 m (0 ft)

Population (2023)
  - Administrative unit: 6,963
  - Administrative unit density: 130/km^{2} (338/sq mi)
- Time zone: UTC+1 (CET)
  - Summer (DST): UTC+2 (CEST)
- Postal Code: 4503

Shëngjin (Albanian pronunciation: [ʃəɲˈɟin]) is a coastal resort town and a former municipality in Lezhë County, northwestern Albania. At the 2015 local government reform, it became a subdivision of the municipality of Lezhë. The population at the 2023 census was 6,963. Shëngjin is a growing tourist destination, well known for its beaches and resort accommodations. Shëngjin is one of many cities within the District of Lezhë and is home to one of Albania's entry ports, Port of Shëngjin.

== History ==
The area of Shëngjin has been identified with the site of the ancient harbour of Nymphaeum on the coast of Illyria, three miles to the north of Lissus. In the vicinity of Shëngjin the League of Lezhë was stipulated by Skanderbeg uniting the Albanian princes in the fight against the Ottoman Empire in the 15th century. Skanderbeg is recognized as a national hero for his efforts to unite the region against the Turks.

Shëngjin's coastline has always provided a key geographic asset to the area for over a thousand years. The town operated as the main port for the interior city of Scutari. It was repeatedly occupied and/or attacked by the Venetians during their many wars with the Ottoman Turks. Before World War I, Austria-Hungary maintained a consulate to serve its small business interests in the region.

The town was known as Şingin during the Ottoman period. It was loyal to the Ottomans during the Albanian revolt of 1911 due to the presence of Turkish soldiers in the fortress of Scutari. It was captured by the Serbian and Montenegrin armies in November 1912 when the latter put Scutari under siege. Shëngjin was claimed by Montenegro, but both armies were forced to evacuate by the Great Powers. Serbia reoccupied the town in summer 1915, and held it until driven out by the advancing Austro-Hungarian Army in January 1916. The Austrians evacuated in November 1918, and were replaced by Italian troops for several months until the frontier with the new Yugoslavian State was settled.

In 1924, the Albanian government renamed Shengjin as Port Wilson, in honor of American President Woodrow Wilson for backing Albania's independence in 1919, when proposals for Albania's partition were circulated among the Great Powers but strongly opposed by the President. In April 1939, the Italian Army landed at Shëngjin in order to occupy Scutari and northern Albania. The town's name was officially changed to the old Italian San Giovanni di Medua during World War II. After the war, the town's name reverted once more to Shëngjin.

The Municipal Unit implements national legislation and local ordinances, while trying to promote the general welfare of its citizens. Over the past years, Shengjin has become an important tourist destination in Albania. Shëngjin's former Komuna has had the privilege of welcoming national leaders as well as foreign dignitaries to the city.

== Geography ==
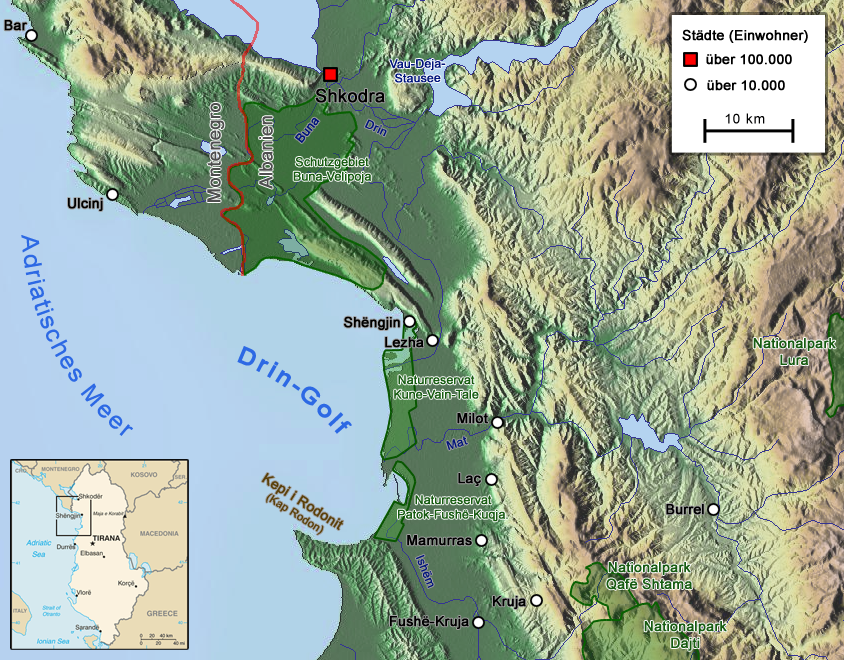
Shengjin and the nearby protected areas

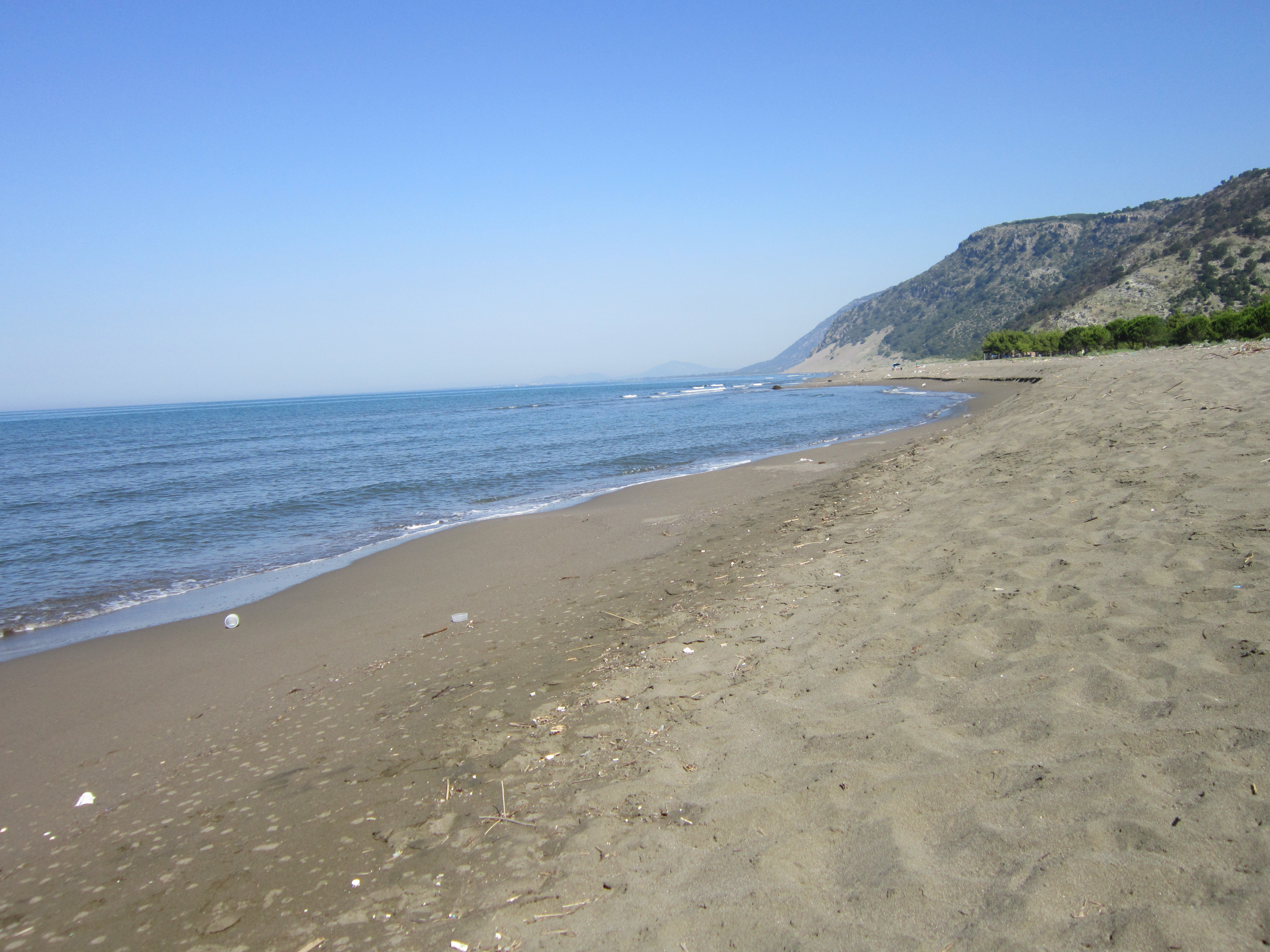
Rana e Hedhun coastal dune

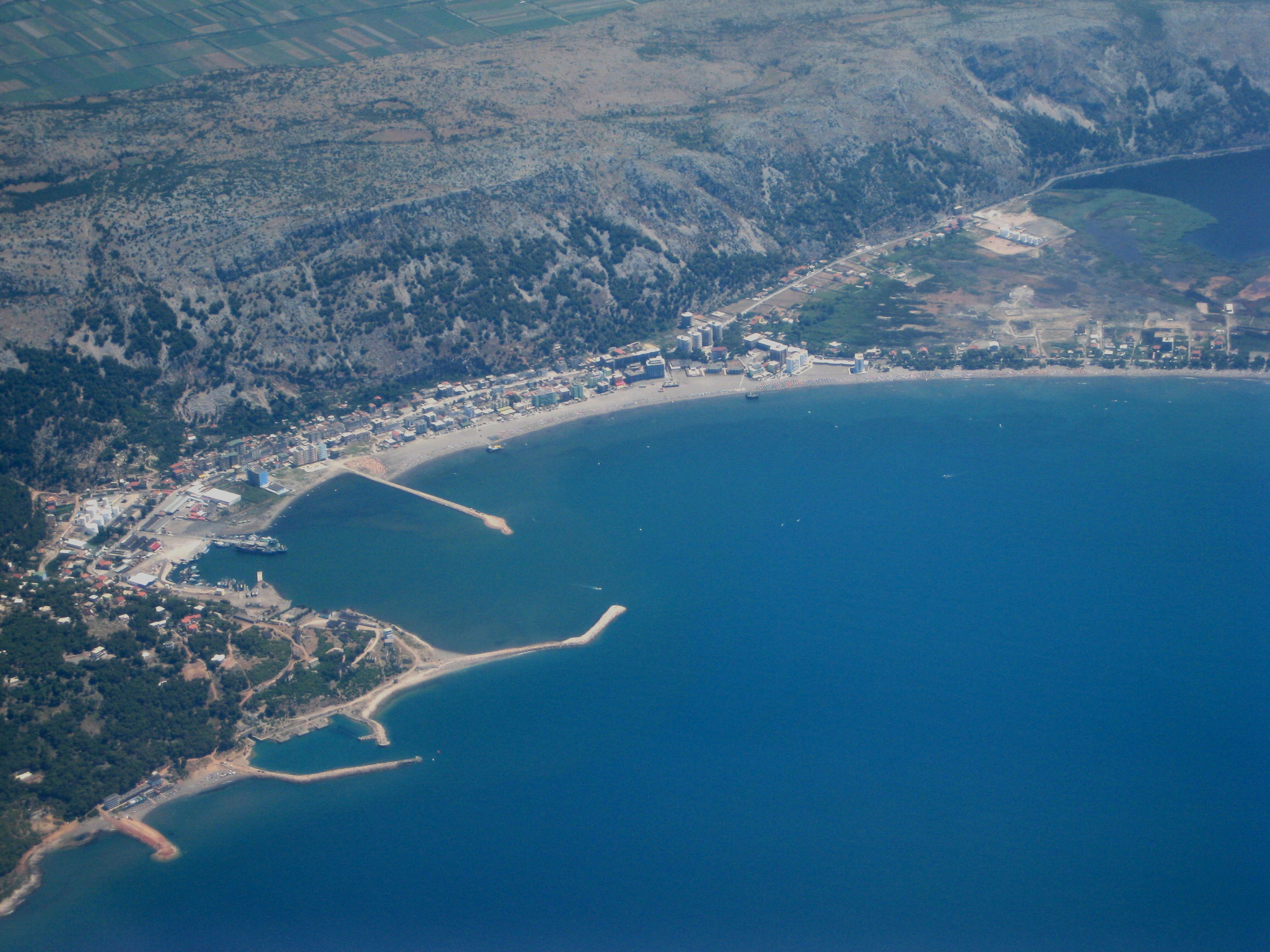
Aerial view of Shengjin

Shëngjin is located approximately 100 m (110 yards) away from the waters of the Adriatic Sea, and below a mountainside called Rrenci that is approximately 159 m (522 feet) in height. Shëngjin is also located approximately 60 km (37 miles) from the Tirana Mother Teresa International Airport.

Shëngjin offers a wide arrange of environmentally friendly activities. To the south of the city, the protected area of Kunë-Vain-Tale Nature Park is located, which offers a place to enjoy the natural surroundings of wetlands and seafront. Similarly, just north of city center, "Rana e Hedhun" in Gheg Albanian or "Rera e Hedhur" in standard Albanian coastal dune is located, which also offers an experience of rural and undeveloped sand dunes along the coastline.

According to EssentialAlbania.com, "Being an ecological city, Shengjin in Albania offers some of the best fishing grounds that ensure that there is a balance between the rate of fishing and the frequent of fishing so that to ensure that there is no too much loss of fish from the sea. They respect the fact that the fish need to breed in order to maintain their population."

== Economy ==
Shëngjn's economy is focused around two major industries: seaport and tourism. The Port of Shëngjin, or Shëngjin Harbor, is the northernmost seaport in Albania and is frequently accessed by cargo and fishing vessels. The Port of Shëngjin provides the area with a strong industrial foundation. Shëngjin has the third largest port in Albania and the Harbor's access point is located on the northwest part of the city. The port is protected by lengthy rock walls that extend into the sea. Shëngjin has approximately 3 km (2 miles) of beach front.

In 2019, electronic music festival UNUM took place in Rana e Hedhun, the first such event to be organized on the Adriatic Sea Coast of Albania rivaling similar events along the Albanian Riviera.

== Climate ==
Shëngjin has a mild climate that is typical of the region, with temperatures during the day ranging from 9.5 to 30.1 °C (49.1 to 86.2 °F) from January and August respectively. Night temperatures range from 3.0 to 20.2 °C (37.4 to 68.4 °F) from January (low) and July (high).

Its hottest months are May–September, with average day temperatures from 24 °C (75 °F) in May to 30 °C (86 °F) in July and August.

== Politics ==
=== Italian asylum centers ===
Italian Prime Minister Giorgia Meloni and Albanian Prime Minister Edi Rama signed a migration agreement in early November 2023. Italy and Albania agreed to set up reception centers for asylum seekers in Shëngjin, Albania, run by Italy. The asylum centers will be run under Italian law and with Italian staff. Asylum applications will be processed directly. These are the first reception centers for migrants outside the EU to be run by an EU country. However, Italian courts have repeatedly ordered the temporary repatriation of those migrants brought to Albania. By October 2025, only 256 have been detained there. In most cases, judicial decisions resulted in their return to Italy.

== Gallery ==
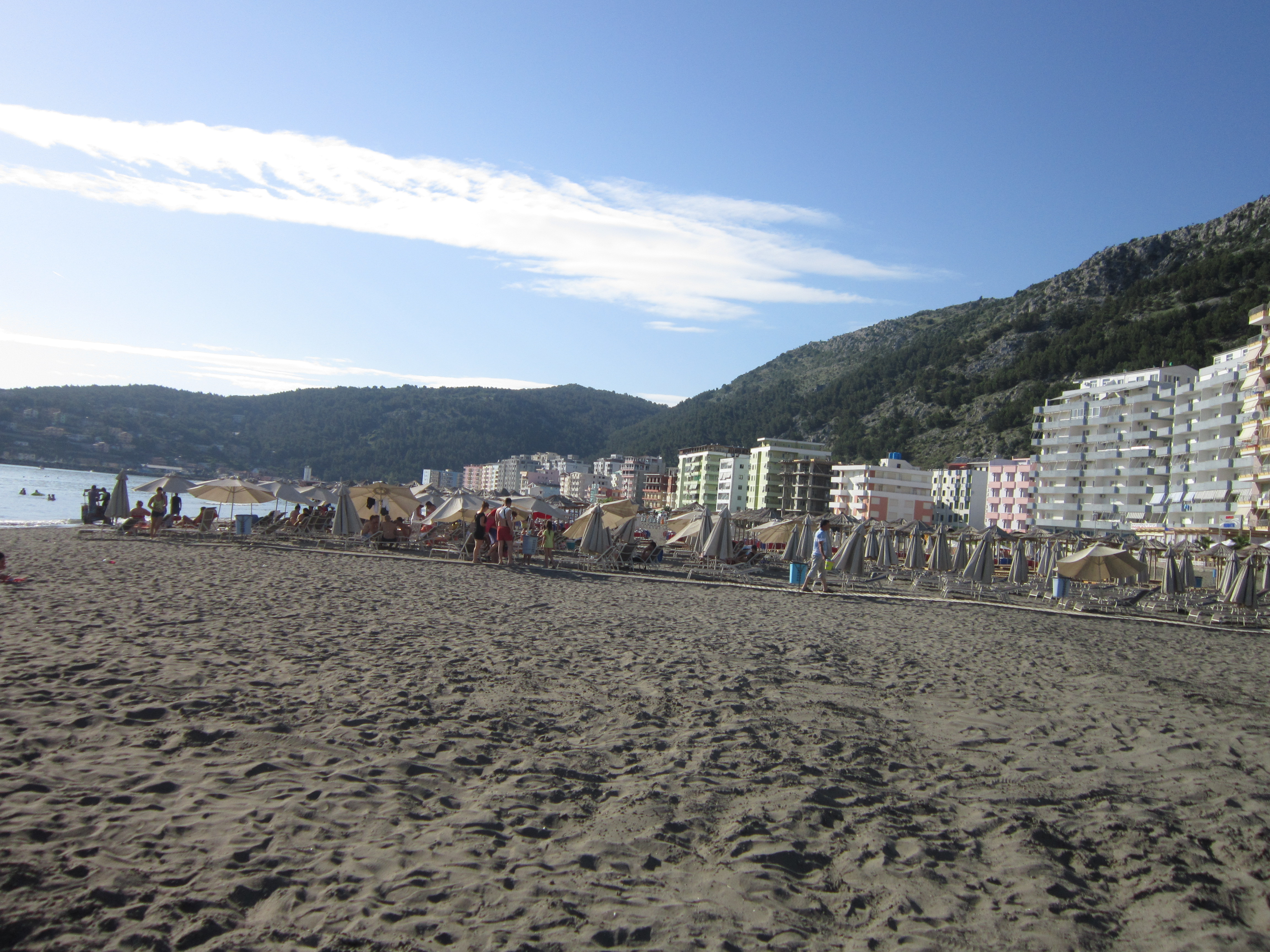
Shëngjin's Beach

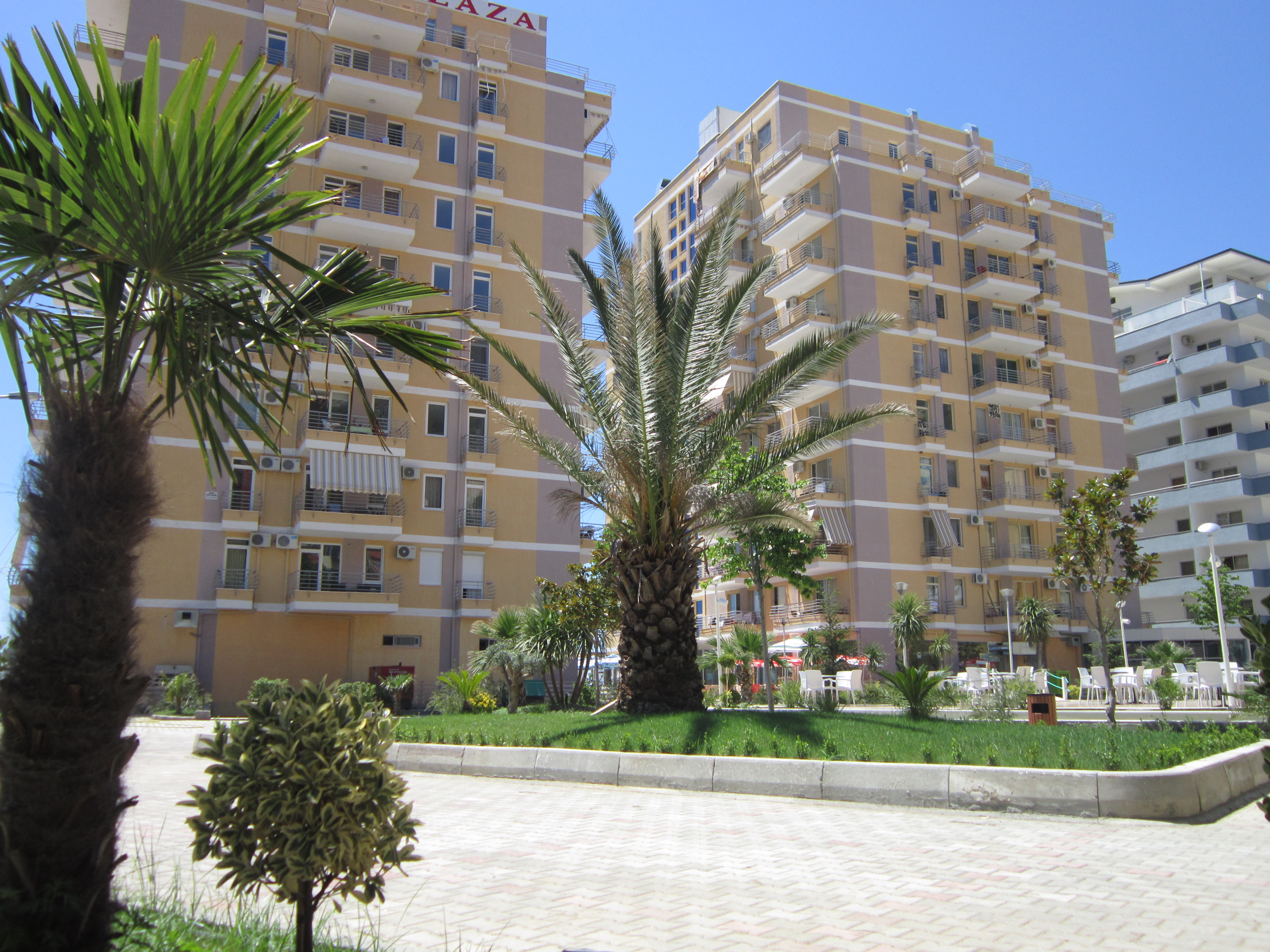
Complex Adriatic

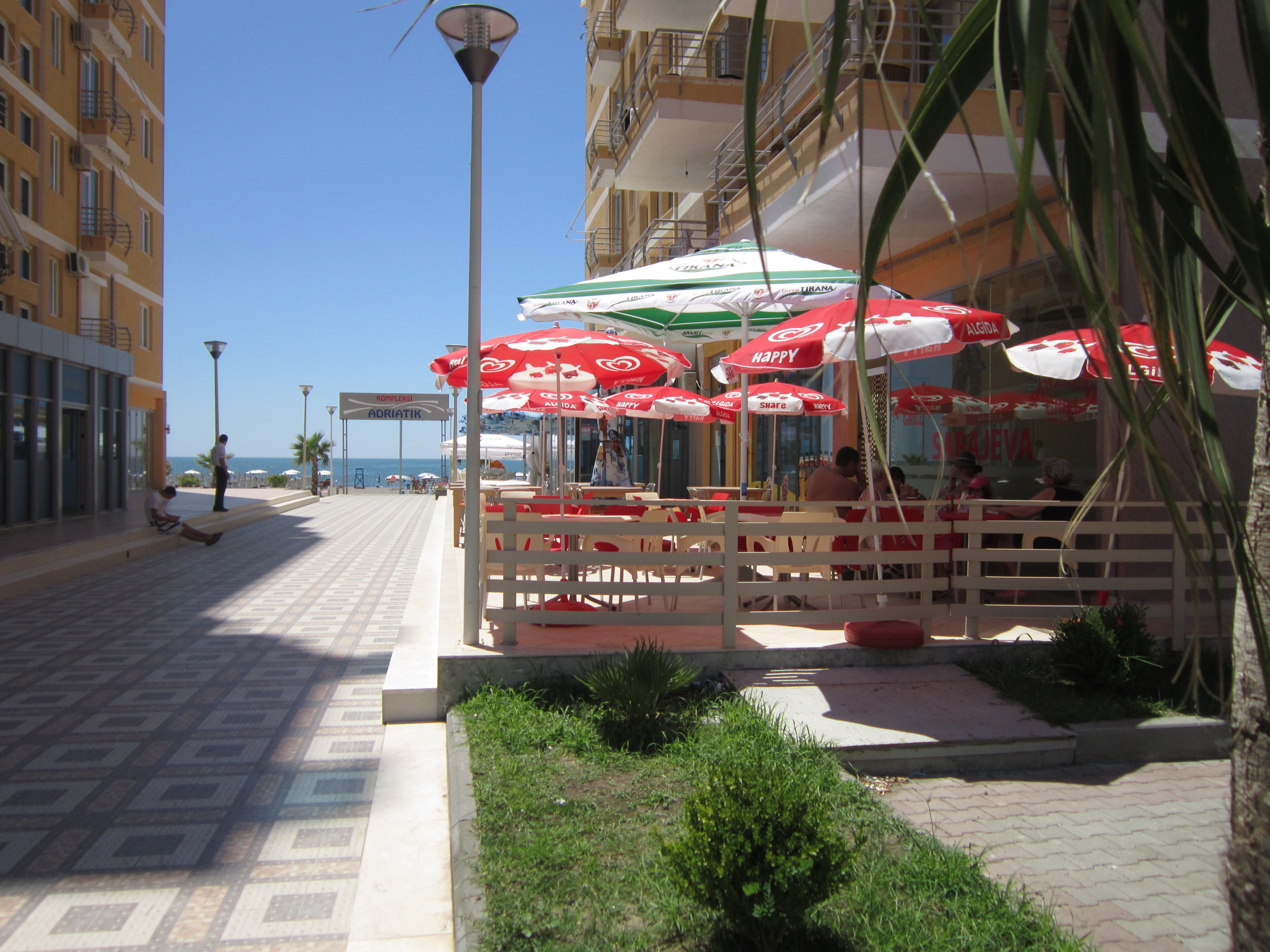
Complex Adriatic

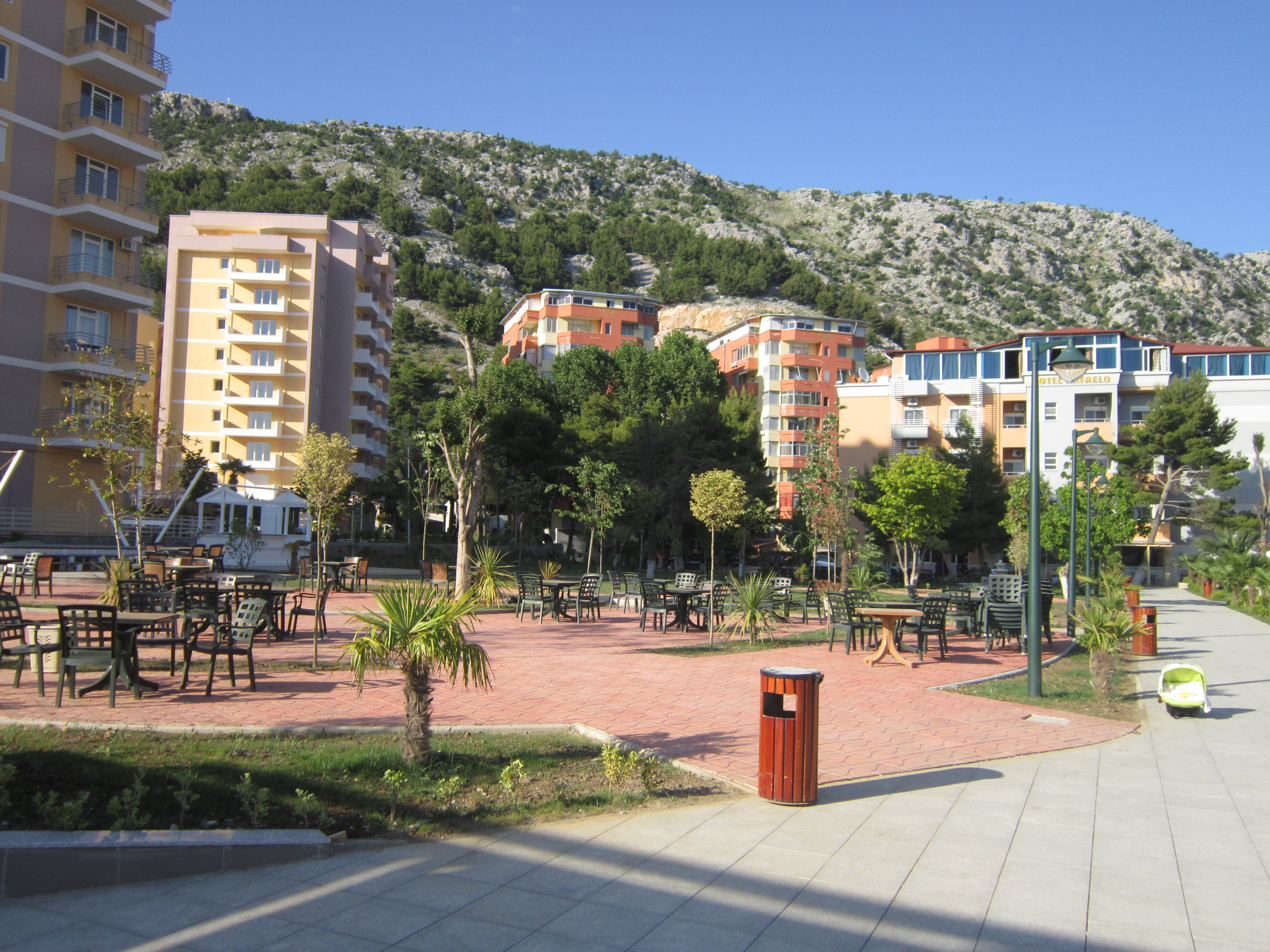
Park

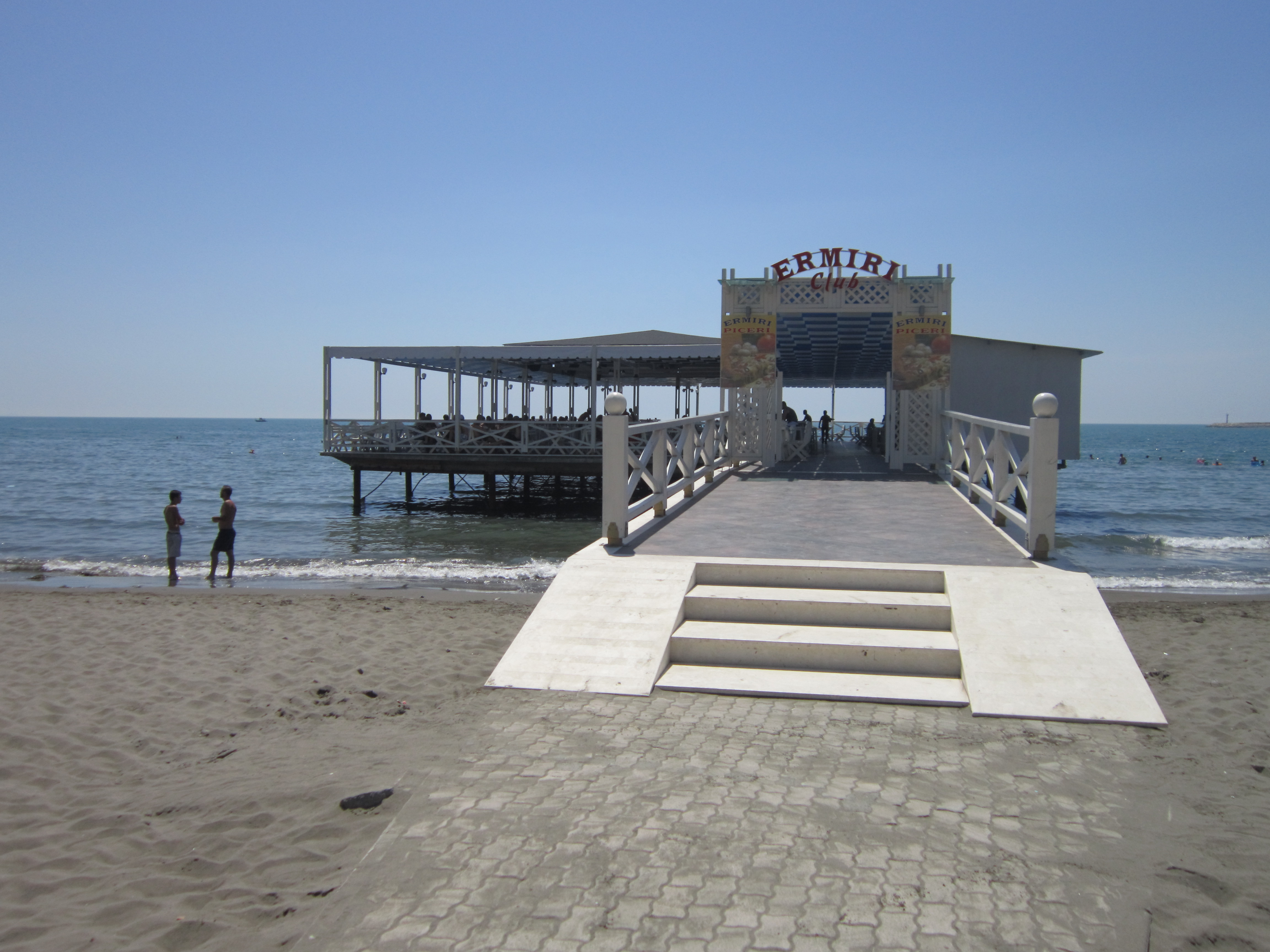
Ermiri Cafe

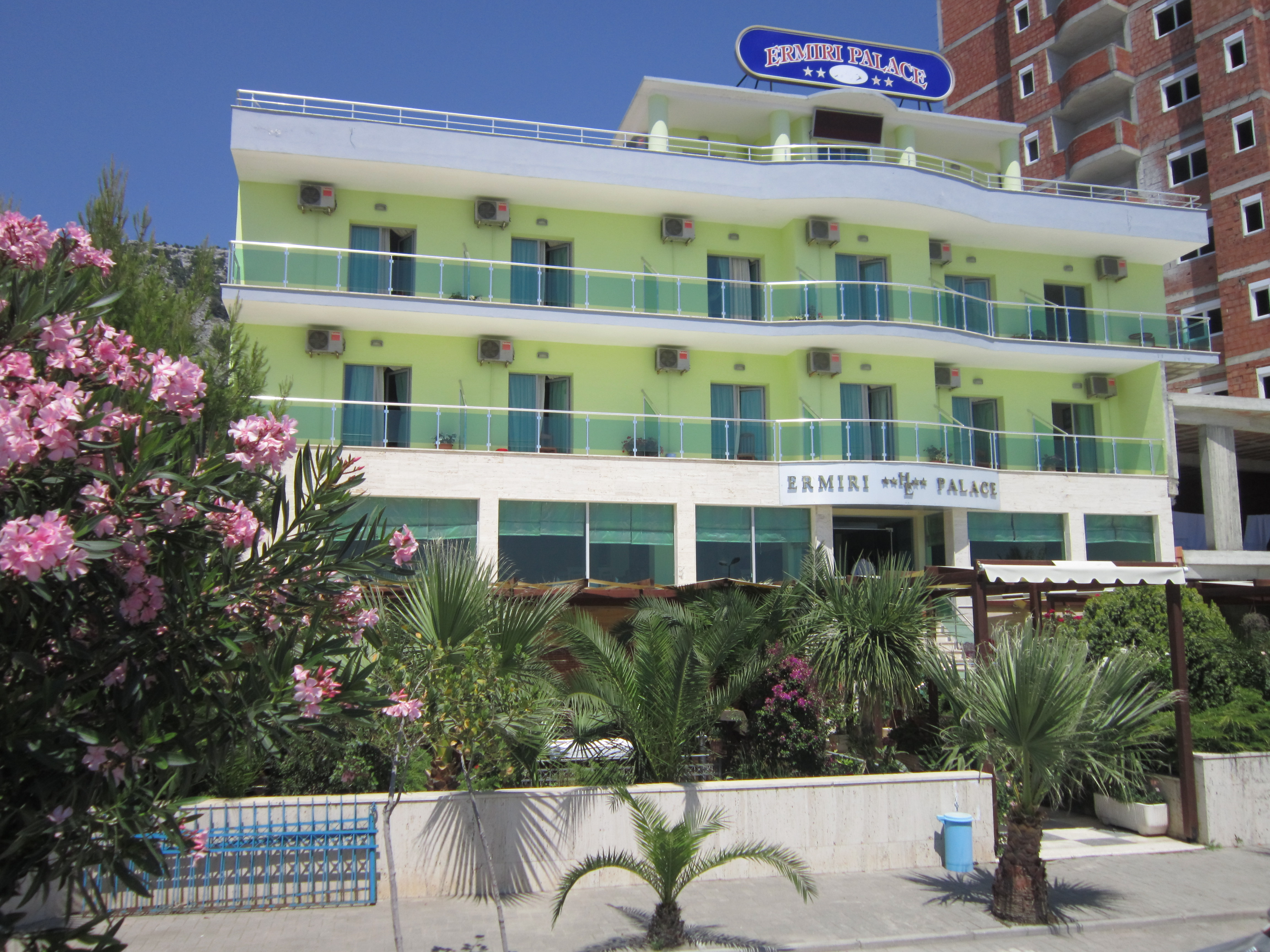
Ermiri Palace

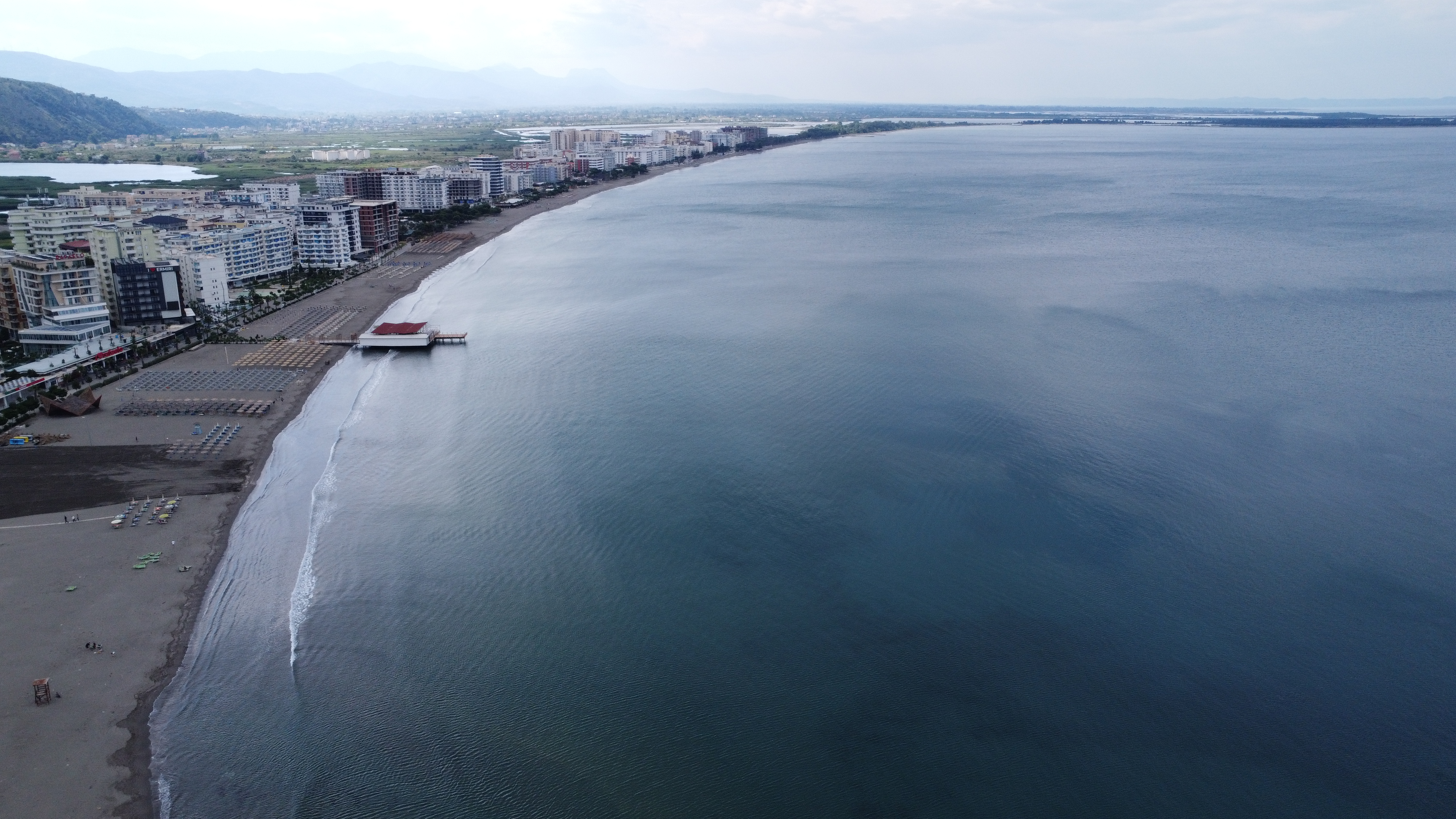
Panoramic view

== See also ==
- Velipoja
- Zef Pllumi
- Durrës
- Albanian Adriatic Sea Coast
- Albanian Riviera
- Tourism in Albania
