= List of lakes of Albania =

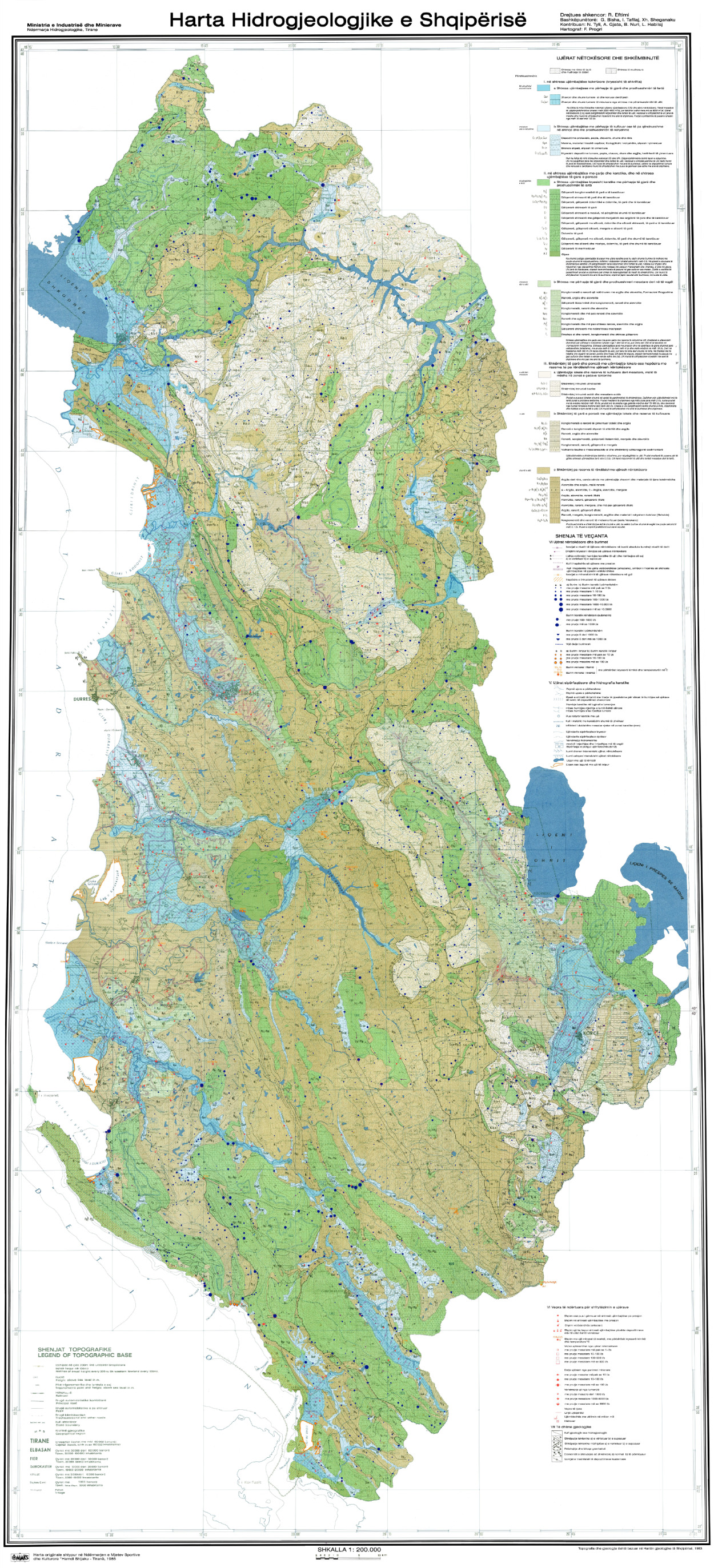
Hydrogeological Map of Albania (1985)

Albania’s diverse landscape, shaped by favorable weather conditions, significant tectonic subsidence, karst processes and coastal dynamics, is home to a wide array of natural and artificial lakes. These water bodies vary widely in altitude, water flow, geology and climate, influencing their unique morphometric features, water balance and hydrochemical and optical properties.

Lakes are generally categorized based on the origin of their basins, a factor that fundamentally alters their geographical characteristics. The country hosts 247 natural lakes and over 800 artificial reservoirs. Natural lakes, primarily formed through karstic or glacial processes, are further classified into four types: 4 tectonic, 134 proglacial, 94 karst and 15 oxbow.

Additionally, the coastal region features lagoons that collectively cover an area of approximately 150 km^{2} (58 sq mi).

== Lakes ==
Ramsar wetland or a marine protected area
Part of a nature park or nature reserve

=== Tectonic lakes ===
No.	Image	Lake	Surface area	Max. depth	Water volume	Map
1		Shkodër	149 km^{2} (58 sq mi)	44 m (144 ft)	3.3 km^{3} (0.79 cu mi)	List of lakes of Albania is located in Albania
2		Ohri	111.2 km^{2} (42.9 sq mi)	295 m (968 ft)	55.4 km^{3} (13.3 cu mi)	List of lakes of Albania is located in Albania
3		Prespa	46.3 km^{2} (17.9 sq mi)	54 m (177 ft)	4.8 km^{3} (1.2 cu mi)	List of lakes of Albania is located in Albania
4		Small Prespa	4.3 km^{2} (1.7 sq mi)	7.7 m (25 ft)	0.2 km^{3} (0.048 cu mi)	List of lakes of Albania is located in Albania

=== Artificial lakes ===
No.	Image	Lake	Surface area	Max. depth	Water volume	Map
1		Fierza	70.14 km^{2} (27.08 sq mi)	128 m (420 ft)	2.7 km^{3} (0.65 cu mi)	List of lakes of Albania is located in Albania
2		Vau i Dejës	25 km^{2} (9.7 sq mi)	50 m (160 ft)	0.26 km^{3} (0.062 cu mi)	List of lakes of Albania is located in Albania
3		Ulëza	13.5 km^{2} (5.2 sq mi)	54 m (177 ft)	0.04 km^{3} (0.0096 cu mi)	List of lakes of Albania is located in Albania
4		Koman	12 km^{2} (4.6 sq mi)	175.5 m (576 ft)	0.43 km^{3} (0.10 cu mi)	List of lakes of Albania is located in Albania
5		Shkopet	6 km^{2} (2.3 sq mi)	40 m (130 ft)	0.04 km^{3} (0.0096 cu mi)	List of lakes of Albania is located in Albania
6		Bovilla	4.6 km^{2} (1.8 sq mi)	18 m (59 ft)	0.105 km^{3} (0.025 cu mi)	List of lakes of Albania is located in Albania

== Lagoons ==
Part of a nature park or nature reserve

No.	Image	Lagoon	Surface area	Max. depth	Map
1		Karavasta	43.3 km^{2} (16.7 sq mi)	1.3 m (4 ft 3 in)	List of lakes of Albania is located in Albania
2		Narta	41.8 km^{2} (16.1 sq mi)	1.5 m (4 ft 11 in)	List of lakes of Albania is located in Albania
3		Butrint	16.3 km^{2} (6.3 sq mi)	21.4 m (70 ft)	List of lakes of Albania is located in Albania
4		Patok	4.8 km^{2} (1.9 sq mi)	0.7 m (2 ft 4 in)	List of lakes of Albania is located in Albania
5		Viluni	3.0 km^{2} (1.2 sq mi)	1.3 m (4 ft 3 in)	List of lakes of Albania is located in Albania

Other smaller natural or glacial lakes include Lura Lakes, Lake Sheep, Lake Gramë, Lake Buni Jezercë, Lake Dash, Lake Sylbicë, Lake Dhënve, Lake Sope and Lake Malik, which was drained by government's decision.

== See also ==
- Biodiversity of Albania
- Protected areas of Albania
