= Fir of Drenovë-Sinicë Protected Landscape =

Protected area in Albania

- IUCN category V (protected landscape/seascape)
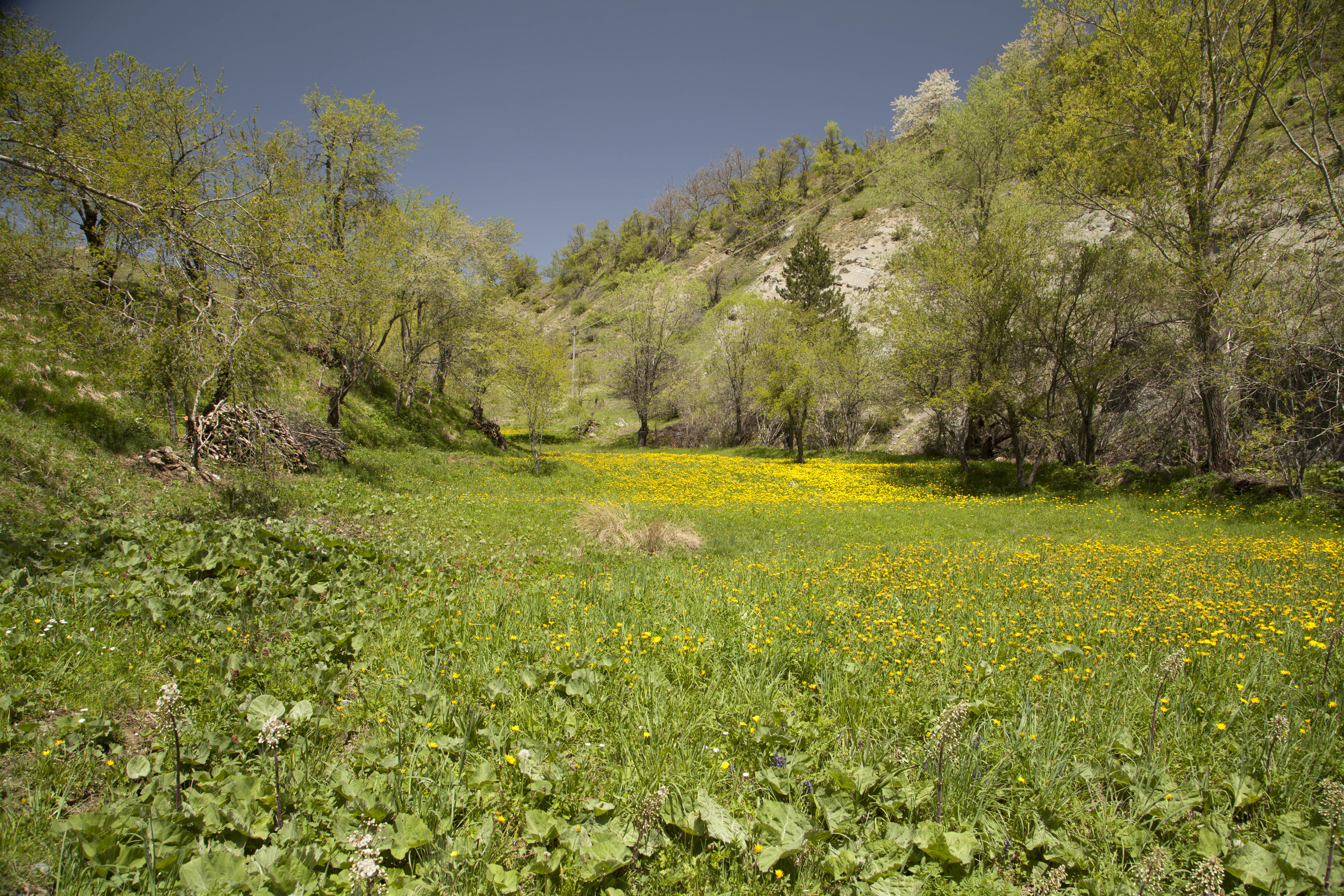
- Near the village of Dardhë

- Location within Albania Location within Europe
- Location: Korçë County
- Nearest city: Korçë
- Coordinates: 40°34′03″N 20°49′48″E
- Area: 1,030 ha (10.3 km^{2})
- Established: 21 November 1966
- Governing body: National Agency of Protected Areas

The Fir of Drenovë-Sinicë Protected Landscape (Albanian: Peisazh i Mbrojtur Bredhi i Drenovës-Sinicë) is a protected landscape near Korçë in eastern Albania, with an area of 10.3 km^{2} (4.0 sq mi).

The park falls within the Illyrian deciduous forests and Dinaric Alpine mixed forests terrestrial ecoregion of the Palearctic temperate broadleaf and mixed forest, dominated by the Silver fir. The diverse morphological, climatic and hydrological conditions of the region favour the formation of a variety of geological features. The national park is host to many rock formations such as the Stone of Capi, the Cut stone, the Zhombrit’s Pyramide, Cave of Tren but also many water features such as the Lenies Lakes, and the Karstic Cavity. All these are under protections and declared as natural landmarks by the Government of Albania.

== See also ==
- Geography of Albania
- Protected areas of Albania
- Biodiversity of Albania
