= Biodiversity of Albania =

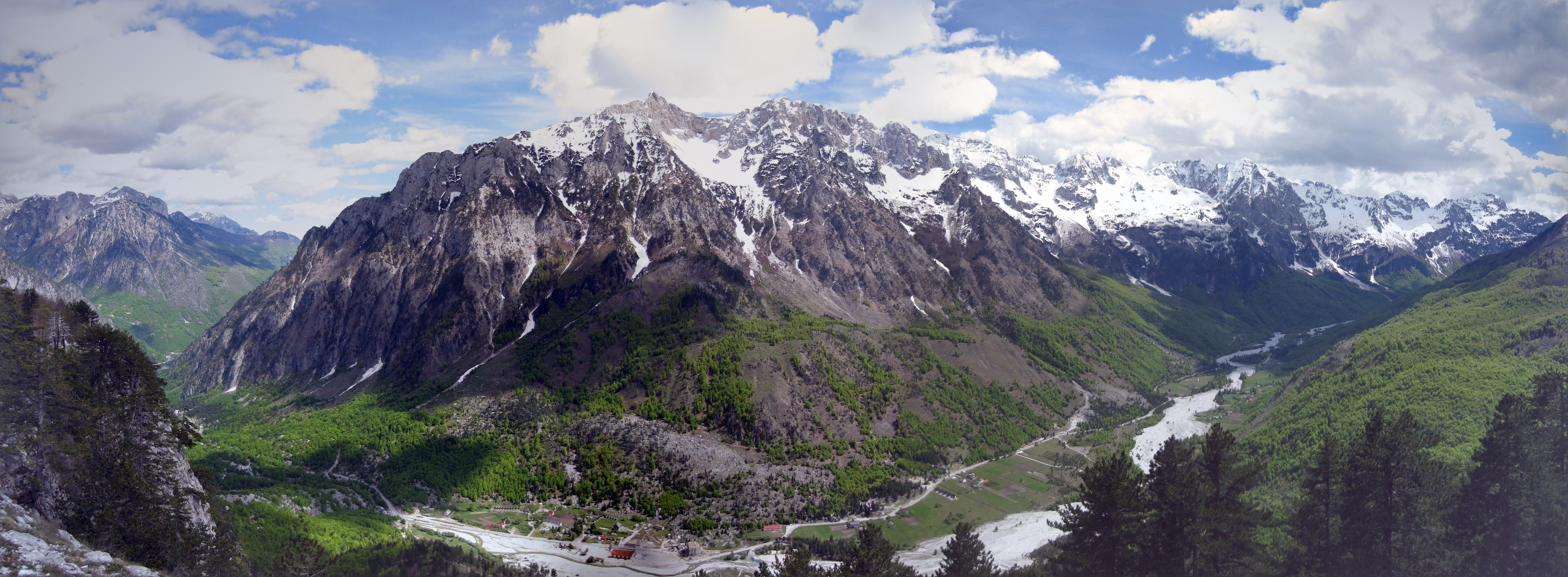
The Albanian Alps represent a major geomorphological part of Albania. It is the southernmost continuation of the Dinaric Alps, which extend along the Adriatic Sea from the Julian Alps in the northwest down to the Albanian Alps in the southeast.

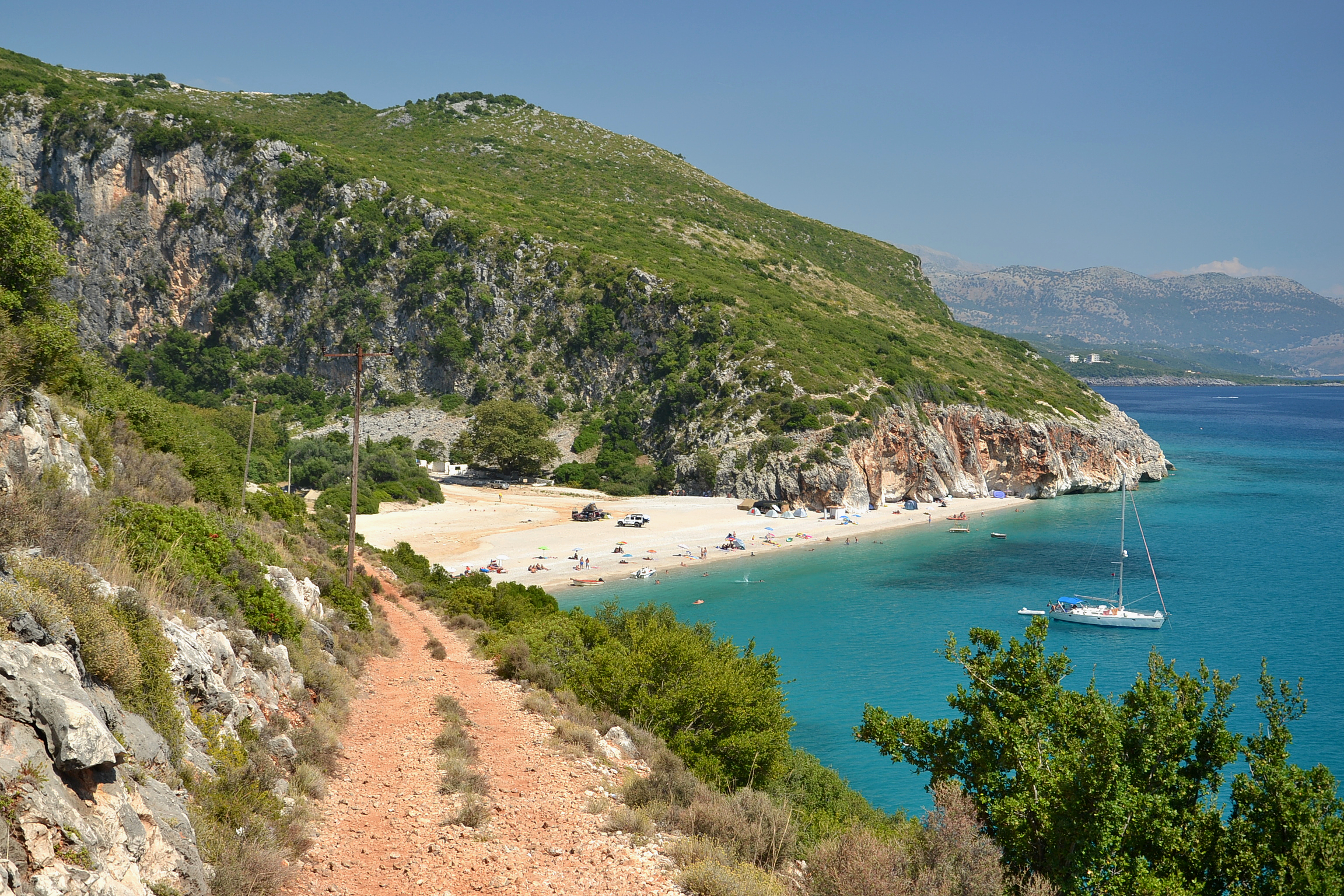
The Albanian Adriatic and Ionian Sea coastlines are dotted with many ecosystems of an immense significance such as rocky coasts, lagoons, wetlands, sand dunes, river deltas, hydrophilic and hydrophobic forests.

For a small country, Albania is characterised by a considerable wealth of terrestrial and marine ecosystems and habitats with contrasting floral, faunal, and fungal species, defined in an area of 28,748 square kilometres. Most of the country is predominantly of Mediterranean character, comprehending the country's centre and south, while the alpine affinity is more visible in the northeast.

Apart the diversity of topography and climate, the direct proximity of Albania to the Mediterranean Sea and the significant location within the European continent have created favourable conditions for appearance of a vast array of flora, fauna and funga with an immense quality, which led the country to be recognised as an important biodiversity hotspot in the continent. The number of globally threatened faunal species in Albania is high with an integral part of more than 181 species, ranking seventh in the Mediterranean Basin.

Albania is predominantly mountainous and hilly with the rapid landscape change from marine to alpine within a short distance. Only one-third of the country consists of lowlands that sprawl across the west of the country facing the Mediterranean Sea with a coastline length of about 476 km (296 mi). The mountain chains consequently cross the length of the country from north to south, featuring the Albanian Alps in the north, the Sharr Mountains in the northeast, the Skanderbeg Mountains in the centre, the Korab Mountains in the east, the Pindus Mountains in the southeast and the Ceraunian Mountains in the southwest stretching alongside the Albanian Riviera.

The hydrographic network of Albania is composed of lakes, rivers, wetlands, seas and groundwaters. There are about 250 lakes of different origins, including tectonic, glacial and fluvial lakes. Among the most important is the lake of Shkodër, the largest lake in Southern Europe, followed by Ohrid, which is considered one of the most ancient lakes in the world. The rivers also have a valuable effect on the local coastal biodiversity (or wildlife). There are 152 rivers in the country, most notable amongst them Drin, Vjosa, Shkumbin, Mat, Ishëm and Osum. The coasts along the Mediterranean Sea are home to various lagoons including Karavasta and Narta. Protected areas belong to the most essential instruments of nature conservation. 799 types of protected areas are designated in Albania, spanning 5.216,96 square kilometres. Amongst them are 14 national parks, 1 marine park, 4 Ramsar sites, 3 World Heritage Sites, 45 important plant areas, 16 important bird areas and 786 protected areas of various categories.

== Ecoregions ==
The country of Albania is part of the Boreal Kingdom and stretches specifically within the Illyrian province of the Circumboreal Region. Its territory can be conventionally subdivided into four terrestrial ecoregions of the Palearctic realm. The Illyrian deciduous forests stretch along the Albanian Adriatic and Ionian Sea Coast in the west across the Mediterranean Basin, while the Pindus Mountains mixed forests occur in the Eastern and Southeastern Mountain Ranges in the east. The Dinaric Mountains mixed forests cover most of the Albanian Alps in the north, while the Balkan mixed forests extend across the eastern end of the range.

== Ecosystems ==
=== Forests ===
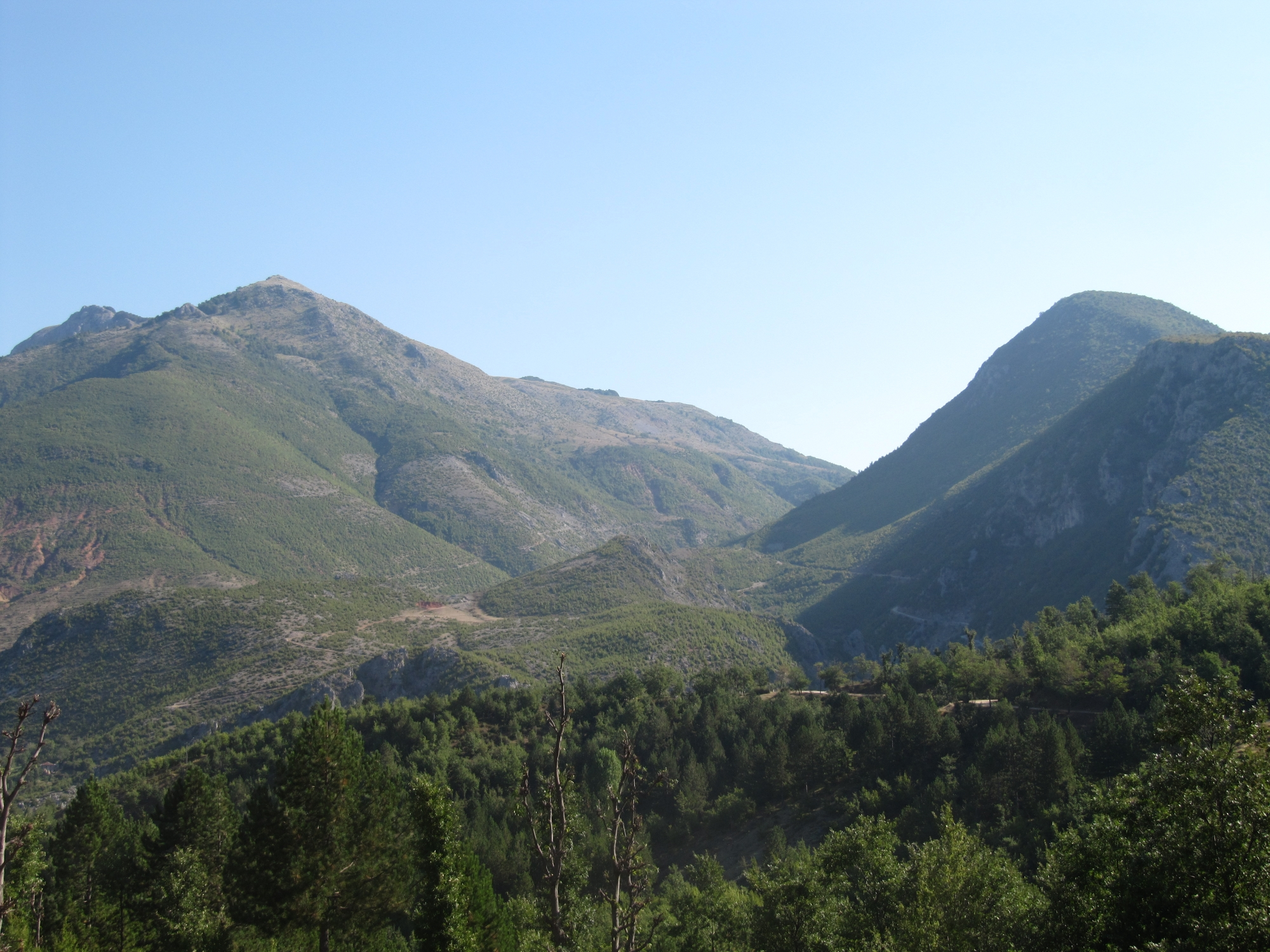
The forests of Rrajcë and Gashi River are part of the Ancient and Primeval Beech Forests of the Carpathians UNESCO World Heritage Site due to the extraordinary value of these forests.

Forests are the most widespread terrestrial ecosystem in Albania. They represent an essential functional and aesthetic component on 36% of the landscapes in the country. The forests of northern Albania are similar to those of Continental Europe, in contrast, the forests of southern Albania share similarities with those of the Mediterranean Basin.

Forests can take many forms, depending on their latitude, soil, rainfall and prevailing temperatures. In Albania forest cover is around 29.% of the total land area, equivalent to 788,900 hectares (ha) of forest in 2020, up from 788,800 hectares (ha) in 1990. Of the naturally regenerating forest 11% was reported to be primary forest (consisting of native tree species with no clearly visible indications of human activity) and around 0% of the forest area was found within protected areas. For the year 2015, 97% of the forest area was reported to be under public ownership, 3% private ownership and 0% with ownership listed as other or unknown.

The concentration of deciduous trees dominates in the country's forests, ranging from almost 56.8% or 6,093 square kilometres of the forested territory. Oak represents an important natural forest resource in Albania with 32.1% followed by beech with 18.4%. There are 12 oak species found in Albania distributed all across the country's territory from north to south, and east to west.

The coniferous forests cover 1,756 square kilometres which constitutes 16.4% of the country's forested total area. Although black pine dominates and is among the most significant tree species in the country, occupying a surface area of roughly 10.2%. It is primarily found in the central mountain range but also scattered in the northern and southern mountain range. Silver fir accounts 1.4% of the conifers with 152 square kilometres, commonly found in the slopes and valleys of the mountains and alongside the Albanian Adriatic and Ionian Sea coasts in the west.

=== Wetlands ===
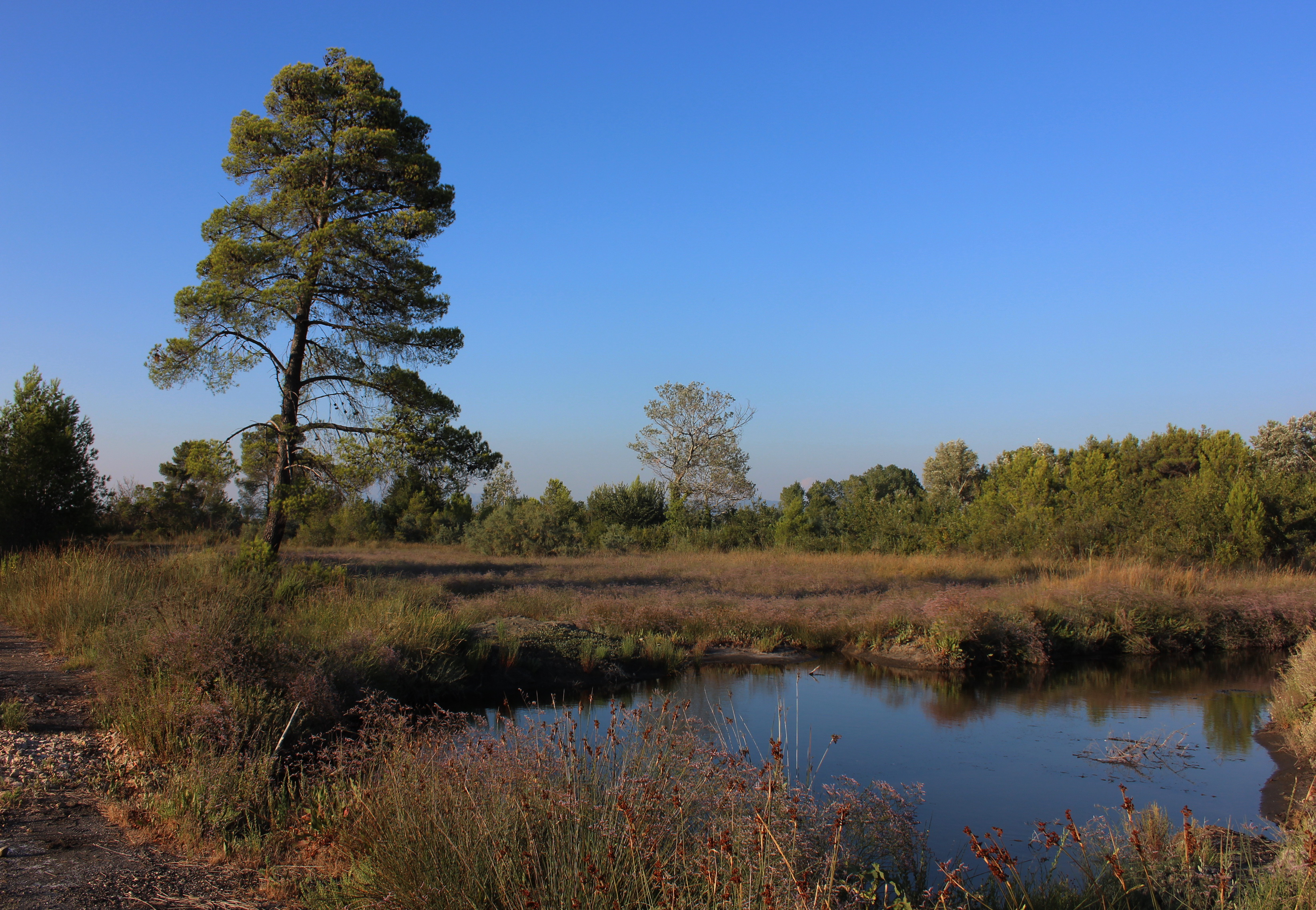
The main lagoon banks and islands of Patoku are covered by salt marsh scrubs.

Albania possesses a wealth of wetland ecosystems supporting diverse and unique habitats. These wetlands contain respectively numerous ecological commodities and services but are under an important charge due to the rapid urbanization and industrialization. Marshes, reed beds and lakes are found in all regions, along with rivers and deltas while wetlands are distributed from the high internally mountainous zone in the southeast to the coastline in the west.

The richest wetland regions are more particularly in the coastal plain along the entire west border of Albania that is shaped by the Adriatic and Ionian Sea. The wetland complex of Butrint, Karavasta and Narta represents one of the most important coastal wetland sites of Albania. The lagoons are separated from the sea by rather narrow sandy bars, which continuously change in size and shape. Other important lagoons include the Patoku Lagoon, Kune-Vain Lagoon, Viluni Lagoon and many others.

Albania is home to several of the most important lakes in Southern Europe. Four lakes are apportioned with its neighbouring countries for instance Lake Shkodër with Montenegro, Lake Ohrid with North Macedonia, Small Lake Prespa with Greece and Lake Prespa with North Macedonia and Greece. All of them are nevertheless of international importance not least for the limnology and biodiversity. Moreover, Lake Shkodër and Lake Prespa have been recognised as a wetland of international importance by official designation under the Ramsar Convention.

=== Estuaries ===
An estuary is a partly enclosed coastal body of water that form at river mouths and provide unique habitats for migratory bird populations, invertebrates, as well as marine fish, including those that visit to breed. The main characteristics of estuarine life are the variability in salinity and sedimentation. They are determined by a region's geology, and influenced by topographical, chemical and climatic conditions.

Although small in size, Albania has many rivers that flow through its expanses. The major rivers of Albania are the Drin, Vjosa, Mat, Ishëm, Erzen, Shkumbin and Seman that discharges into the eastern Adriatic Sea. River flows are highly variable with high flows in winter and early spring and dramatically lower flows in the late summer.

In addition, the rivers have received little scientific attention from biologists and little is known about the status of biodiversity they contain, however, the river basin of Drin is one of the most important biodiversity hotspots in Europe.

== Flora ==
Albania host the Mediterranean Basin biodiversity hotspot.

Albania features contrasting and different vegetation types, determined mainly by topography, hydrology, climate and geology. It enjoys a diversity of temperate ecologies, incorporating both deciduous and coniferous forests, wetlands, river deltas, alpine and subalpine pastures and meadows, evergreen and broadleaf bushes, marine and coastal landscapes.

Strategically located on the northern shore of the Mediterranean Sea, Albania appertain to one of the planet's biodiversity hotspots due to the elevated level of endemism within the Mediterranean Basin. The flora of Albania consists of more than 3,200 vascular and 2,350 non-vascular plants and a lesser known number of fungi. The chief elements of the country's flora are 24% mediterranean, 22% balkanic, 18% european and 14% eurasian.

Phytogeographically, the country straddles the Illyrian province of the Circumboreal Region within the Boreal Kingdom. According to the World Wide Fund for Nature and the European Environment Agency, it falls within four terrestrial ecoregions of the Palearctic realm, including the Illyrian deciduous forests, Balkan mixed forests, Pindus Mountains mixed forests and Dinaric Mountains mixed forests.

About 3,000 different species of plants grow in Albania, many of which are used for medicinal purposes. Coastal regions and lowlands have typical Mediterranean macchia vegetation, whereas oak forests and vegetation are found on higher elevations. Vast forests of black pine, beech and fir are found on higher mountains and alpine grasslands grow at elevations above 1800 meters. The genus with the most species in Albania is Trifolium (clover) with a total of 63 species. This is principally due to the Mediterranean climate along the coast. The country is also home to over 20 species of Verbascum, which is due to the proximity to Anatolia, the centre of diversity of Mulleins.

== Fauna ==
=== Birds ===
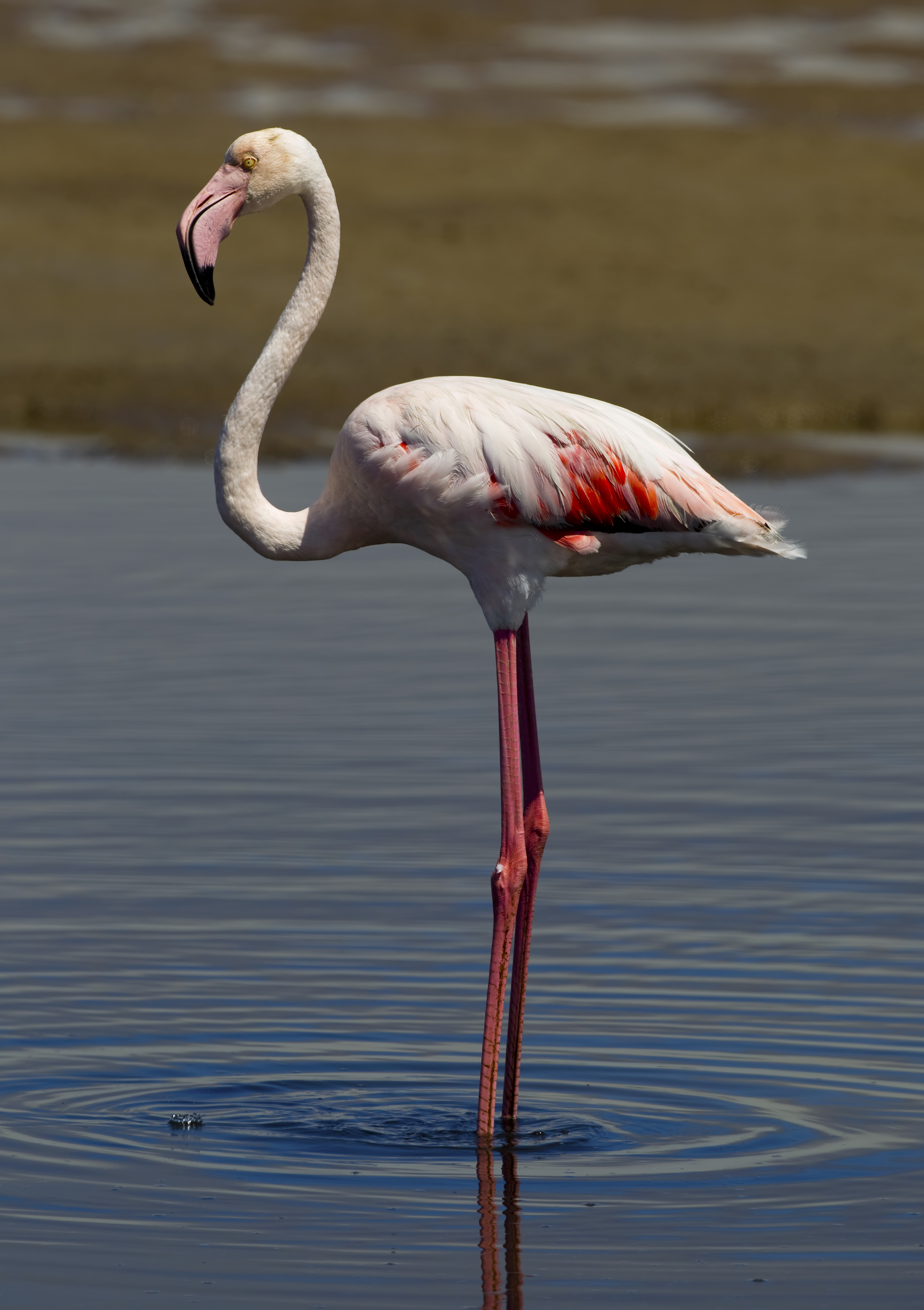
The greater flamingo is a year-round resident in Vjosa-Narta Protected Landscape.

The geographical location of Albania in combination with its variable and complex climate is responsible for the diverse bird population in the country. Over 353 species of bird have been recorded in Albania with 11 globally threatened species and a species introduced by humans. The country is home to favourable wetlands, lagoons, lakes, estuaries and deltas together with the corresponding habitats. These habitats serve as feeding ground for thousands of migrating birds that travels between Northern Africa and Europe through the Adriatic flyway.

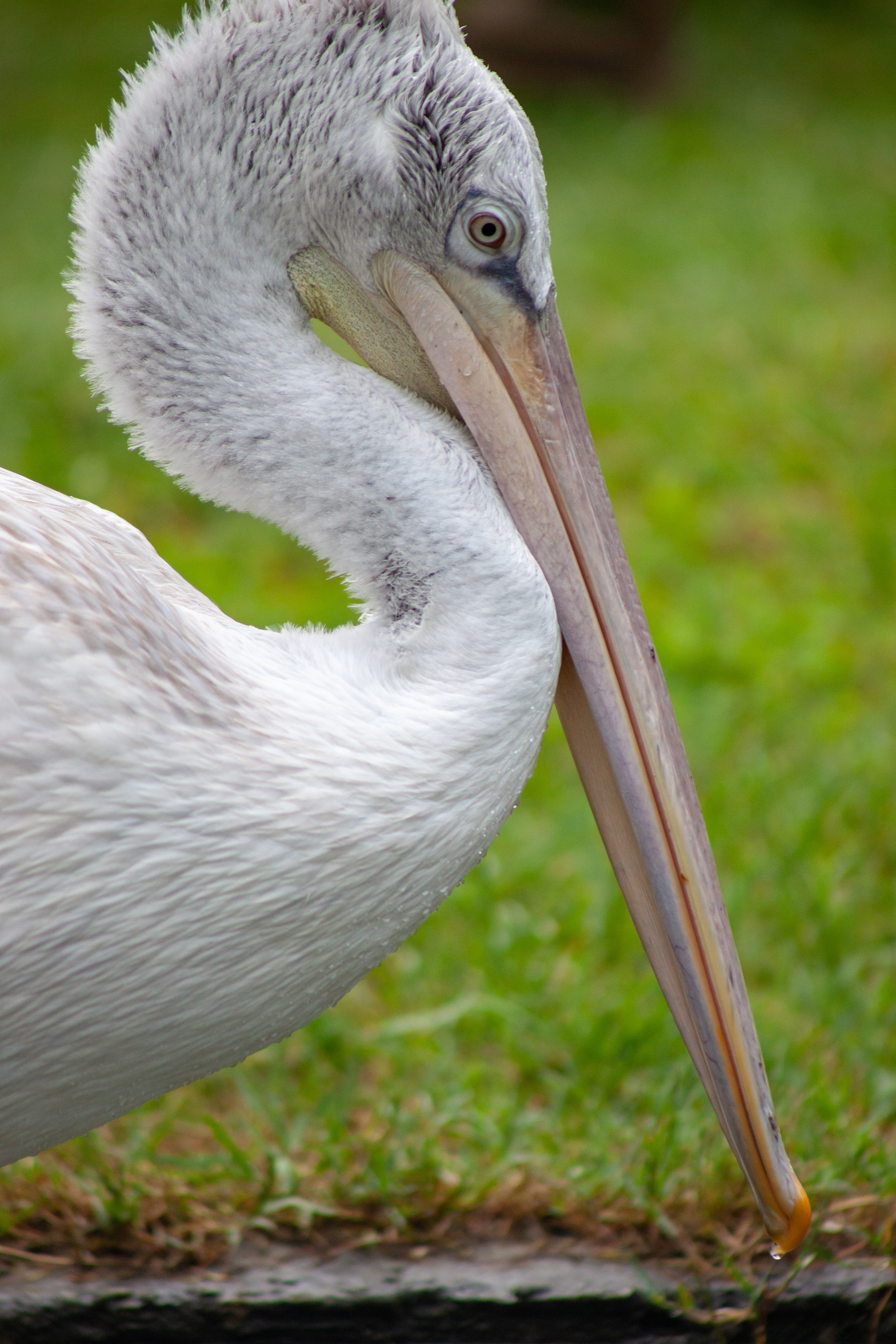
The Dalmatian pelican remains in the lagoons and wetlands throughout the country such as in Karavasta.

There are numerous raptor species found in Albania, some of which are the eagles, hawks, falcons and vultures. The eagles are widespread over the country while different species inhabit different habitats. The golden eagle is the largest bird of prey and especially found in mountainous areas, cliffs and remote areas of Albania.

The white-tailed eagle is found wherever there are large bodies of water and takes mainly fish and occasionally other vertebrates. The short-toed snake eagle is a forest species and takes mostly snakes but also some lizards. There is a great plenty of hawk species found across the country including the Eurasian sparrowhawk, the Levant sparrowhawk and the northern goshawk.

The falcons that occur in the country are well represented by a number of species. They are represented by the eleonora's falcon, eurasian hobby, lanner falcon, peregrine falcon, saker falcon and merlin. A dozen species of vultures can be found living in the country mainly in certain parts of gorges, on cliffs, rocks and caves. Among the most important and prominent species is the globally threatened egyptian vulture. These birds inhabit mainly the southern of Albania but can be found in very few territories in the north.

Located in the Mediterranean Sea, Albania has a rich marine avifauna with many large and various seabird colonies dotted around its pristine coastline in the west. Pelicans and flamingos are more commonly found in the coastal areas. The extremely rare Dalmatian pelican is the most common pelican in the country and very heavy for a flying bird. The greater flamingo, which is out of the six species of flamingos on the planet, can be found along warm, watery regions especially in lagoons such as in Karavasta Lagoon and Narta Lagoon.

=== Mammals ===
Albania is home to a wide range of mammals that are closely associated with its geographical location and climatic conditions. Approximately 58 species of mammals have been recorded to occur in the country. The protected areas, including national parks, nature reserves and biosphere reserves, provide protection to the mammals and are the most likely locations where these animals can be seen.

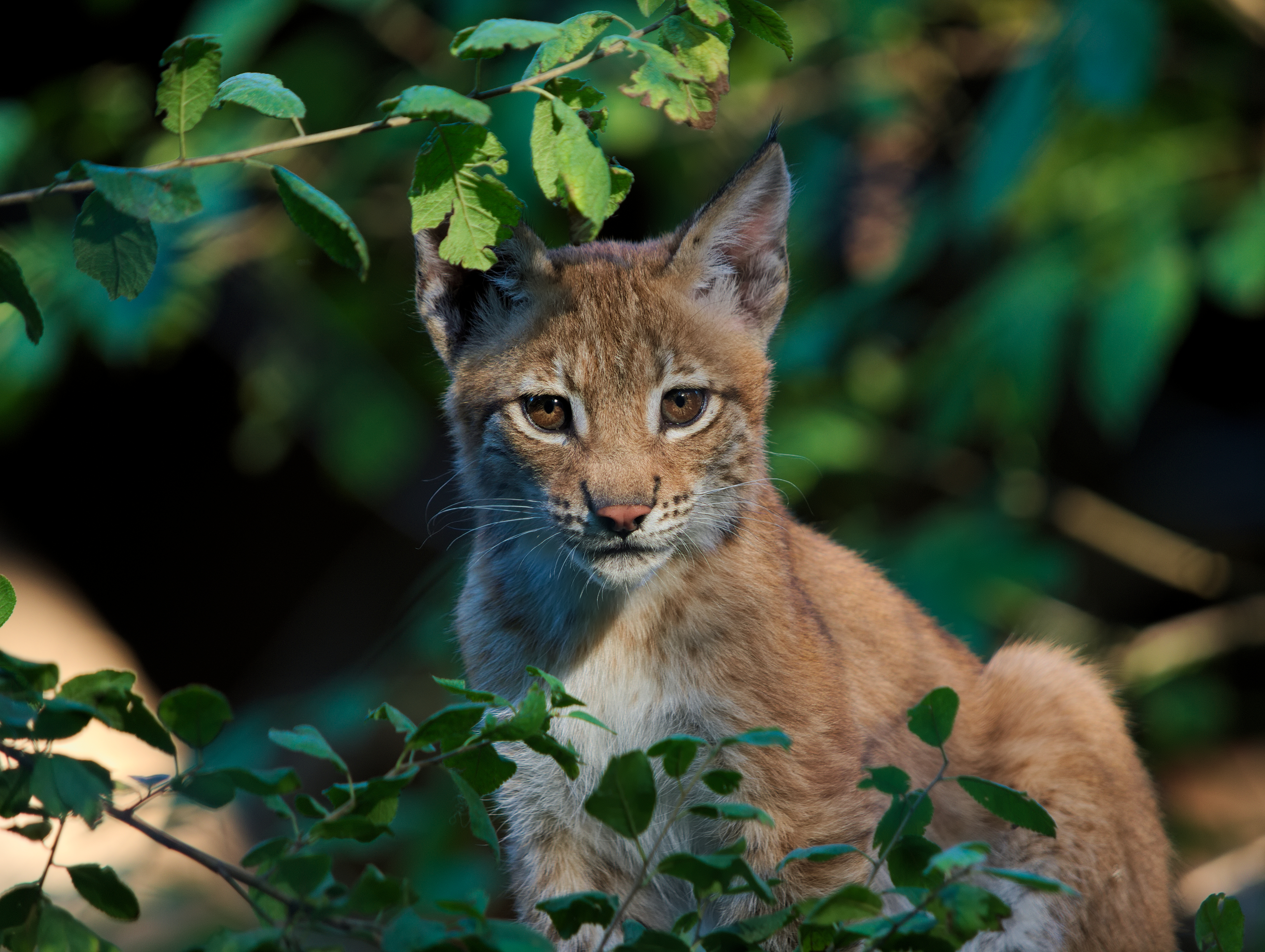
The Eurasian lynx inhabits Shebenik-Jabllanicë National Park.

For a small country, Albania challenges an important role in maintaining and ensuring the long-term survival of the large carnivores of the western and southern Balkan Peninsula. The carnivores seem to be primarily distributed in the last remaining forests throughout the country especially in the areas around the Albanian Alps in the north, the Korab Mountains in the east and the scattered elevated areas in the south, such as in the Karaburun Peninsula, Valamara Mountains and Nemërçka Mountains.

Small terrestrial mammals (STM) are made up of 31 different species. Although the majority of the STM species found in the country have a wide global distribution, six species are known to be endemic to the Balkans and two others to Europe. They have a significant portion of their global distribution range within Albanian territory.

The country's cat species include the Eurasian lynx and European wildcat. All of them are critically endangered, threatened and protected. The country is host to at present the largest distribution area of the critically endangered Balkan lynx, which is considered to be the largest cat in the Balkans, with an estimated population of less than 100 individuals.

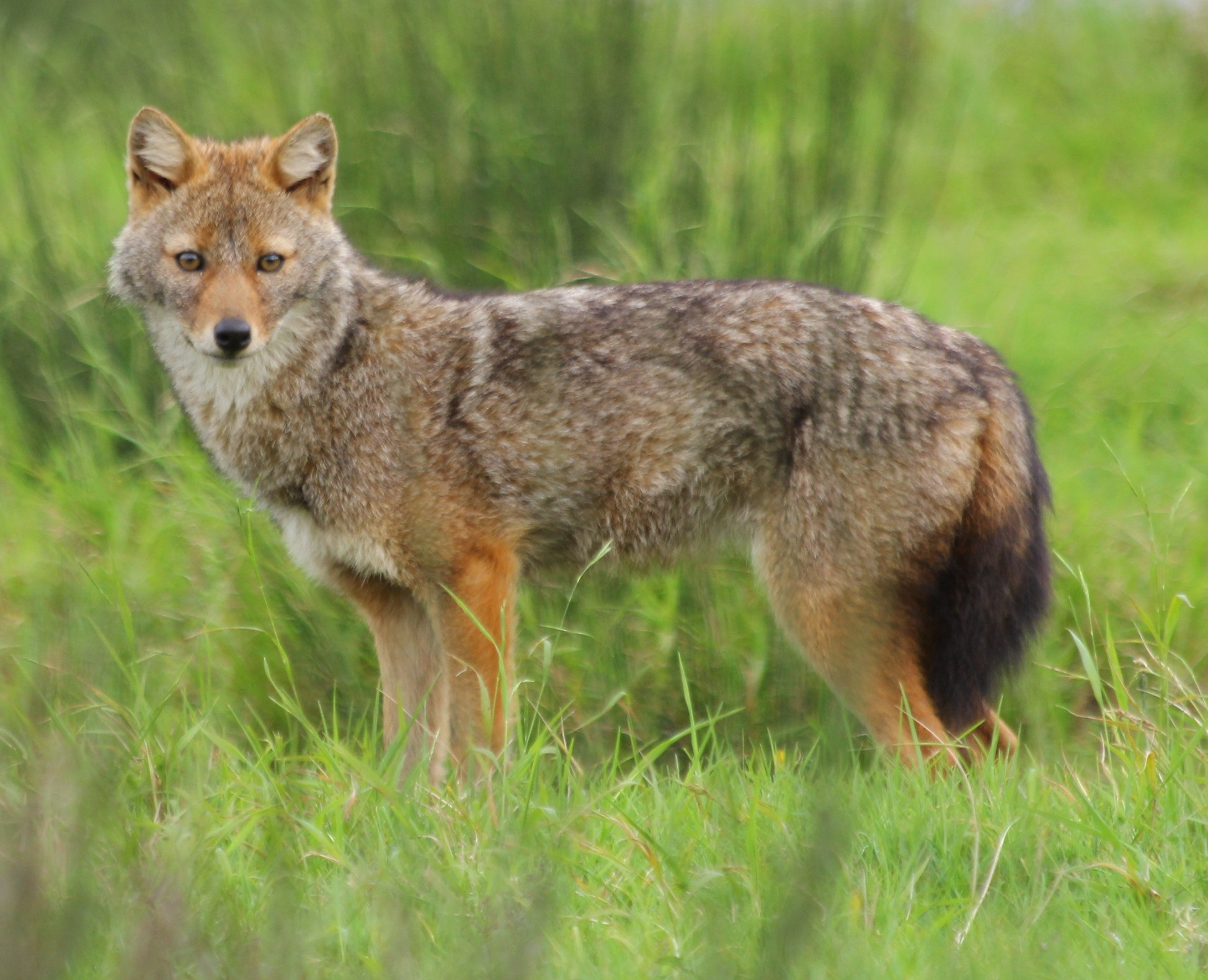
The Llogara and Karaburun-Sazan Marine Park provides habitats for the golden jackal.

The family Canidae has several members in Albania including the gray wolf, Eurasian wolf, red fox and golden jackal. The distribution range of the grey and Eurasian wolf encompasses most of the country's territory. The red fox, which is native, is the largest fox species and appears in every corner of Albania. However, the range of the golden jackal extends across the Western Lowlands along the Albanian Adriatic and Ionian Sea Coast.

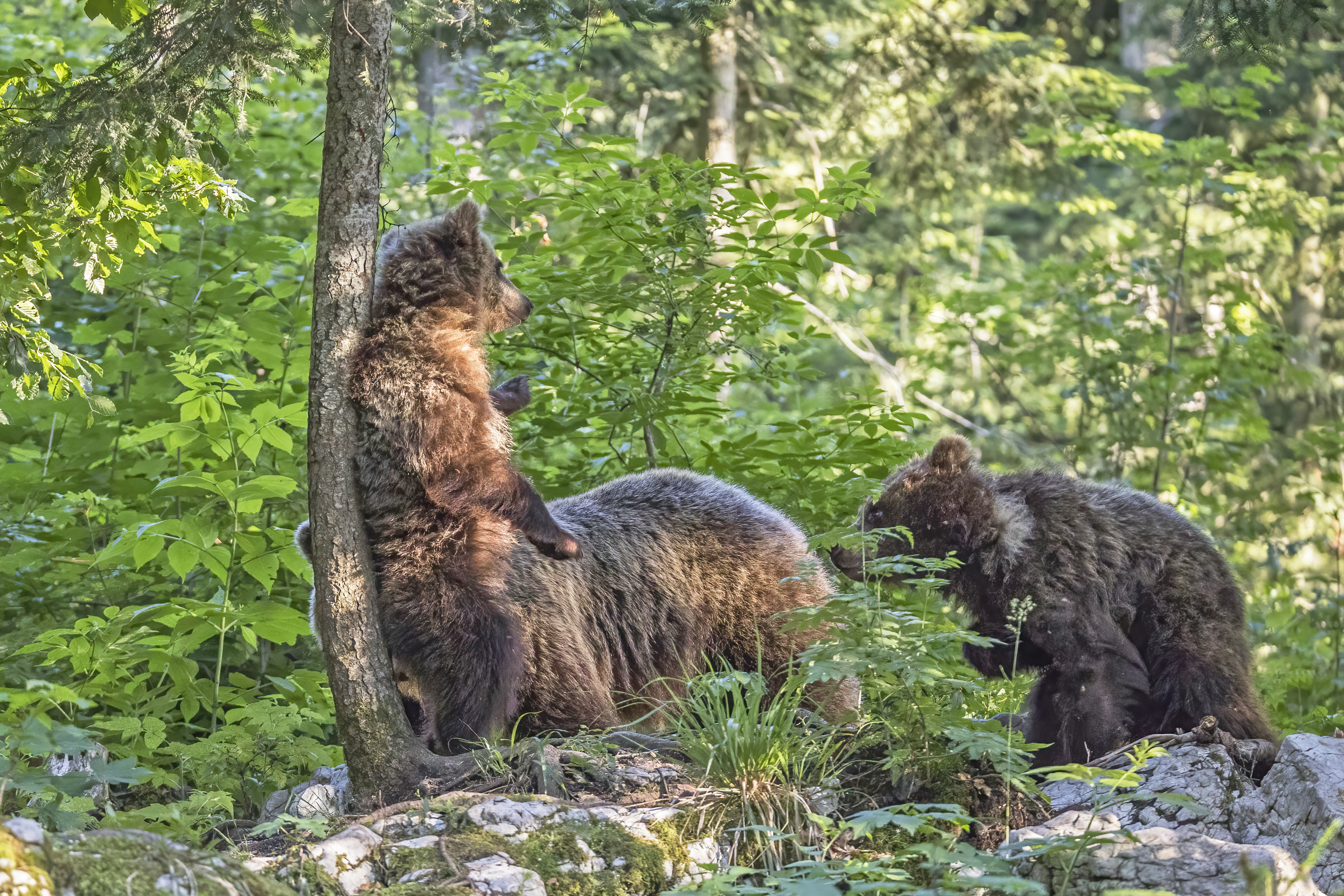
A 14-month-old Eurasian brown bear cub scratching its back.

The brown bear is among Albania's most iconic wildlife species, playing a critical role in maintaining regional biodiversity. Geographically, it belongs to the Dinaric-Pindos population, Europe's second-largest bear group. Albania acts as a vital transnational genetic corridor, bridging the bear populations of Croatia, Slovenia, and Serbia to the north with the isolated, endangered populations of Greece to the south

Modern bear populations inhabit most of Albania's territory, occupying the expansive hilly and mountainous landscapes of the interior. Historically, their habitat encompassed the entire country, including the coast. The western lowlands were originally a vast, malaria-infested network of alluvial wetlands where all major Albanian rivers drained, constantly shifting their courses through a continuous belt of dense deciduous forest.

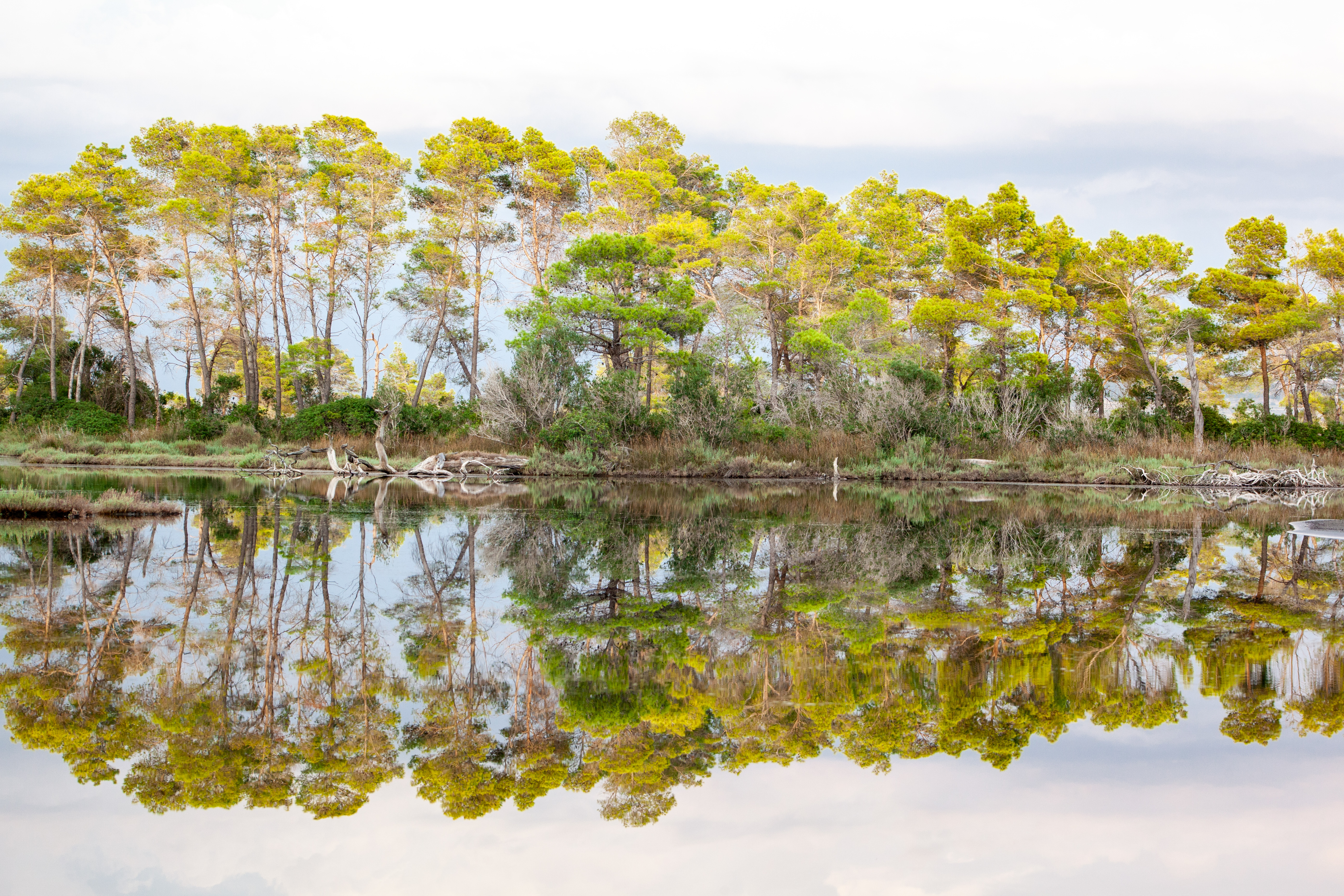
Divjakë-Karavasta National Park, one of the last remaining areas showing what the past western lowlands used to look like.

Post-WWII state reclamation projects aggressively drained over 50,000 hectares of these swamps and cleared the forests to eradicate malaria and establish collective farms. This total habitat destruction permanently eliminated the coastal bear populations, pushing their modern range entirely into the inland hills and mountains.

The current brown bear population is estimated at approximately 490 individuals. While some researchers suggest the actual number could be lower due to tracking overlaps across local administrative borders, others indicate it must be higher as the population remains stable and increasing. Despite these metrics, agricultural and livestock damages across the rural interior are widespread and highly frequent. Local reports consistently document severe damage to livestock, commercial beehives, and orchards, escalating human-wildlife conflict and the threat of retaliatory killings.

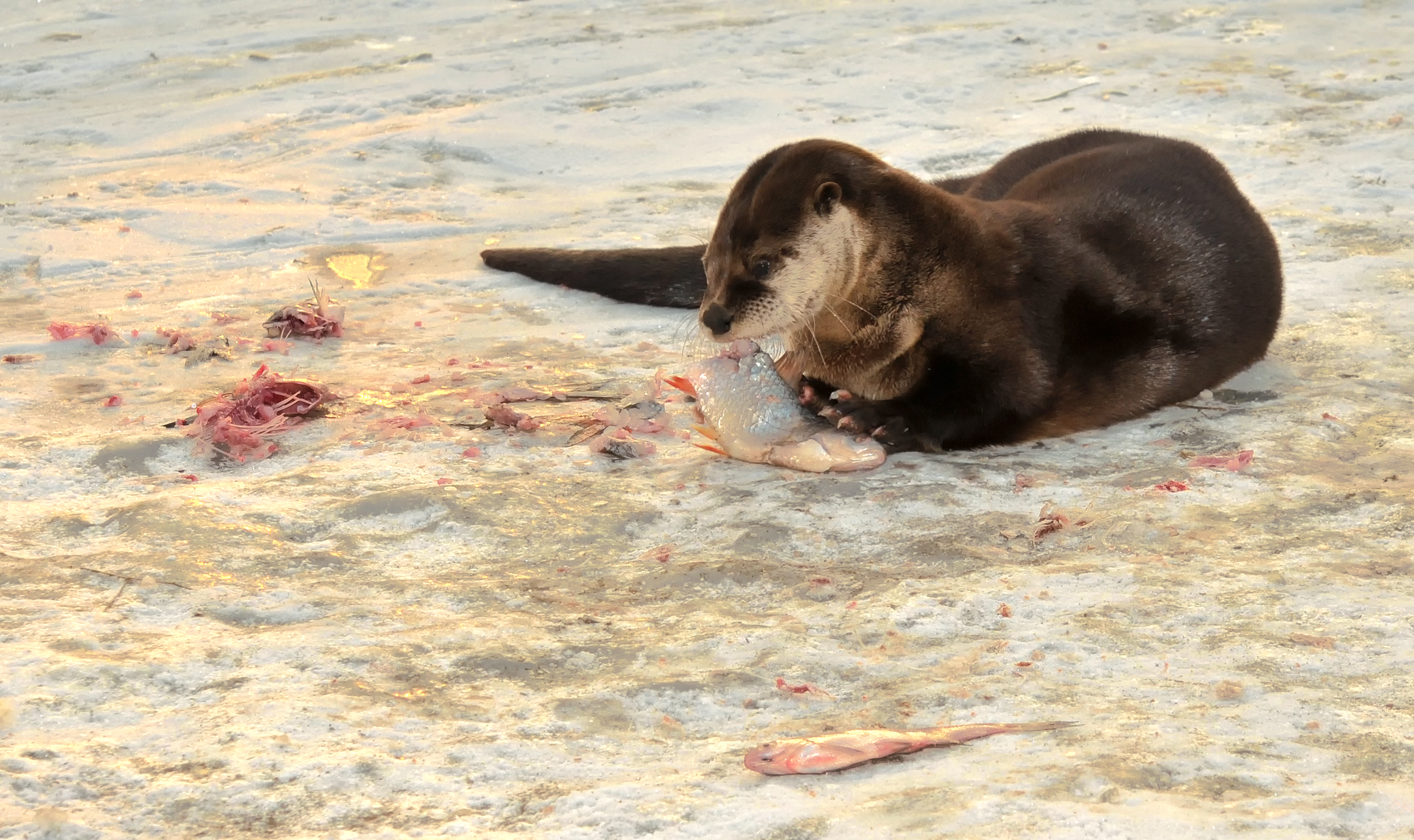
The Divjakë-Karavasta National Park serves as a breeding and feeding ground for the Eurasian otter.

The largest family of carnivorous mammals belongs to the otters, badgers, weasels and martens, all of which are found in the country. All of these are short, furry animals with short, rounded ears and thick fur, but they differ markedly in size, habit and habitat. The Eurasian otter is found throughout much of the country and healthy populations were localised in rivers and marshes in the northwest and the south. The European badger is the most common badger in Albania and found across much of the country's territory.

Classified as carnivores, pinnipeds are divided between earless seals and eared seals. Earless seals do not have ears and cannot get their hind flippers underneath their bodies to crawl. In contrast, eared seals have protruding ears and can walk with all four limbs on land. Nevertheless, the Mediterranean monk seal, among the world's rarest pinniped species, is the only seal species that can be found in Albania. It is primarily home in the rocky coastal regions of southern Albania such as in Karaburun Peninsula, Sazan Island and Ksamil Islands that provide good habitats for the endangered species.

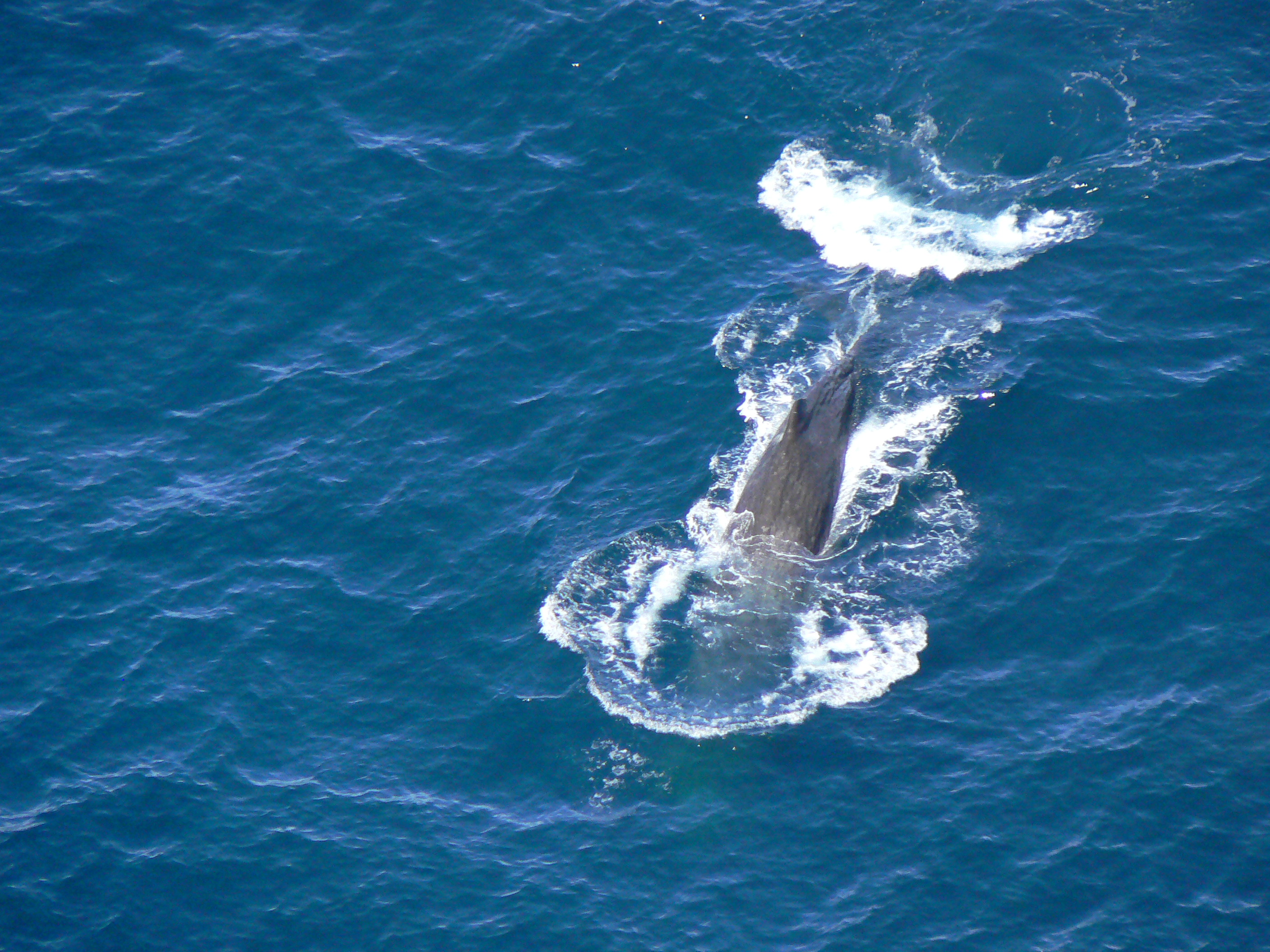
The sperm whale has been observed in the waters of the Karaburun-Sazan Marine Park.

Considering the great availability of water, the country's coast is estimated to be 381 kilometres (237 mi) long. The Mediterranean Sea, which includes the Adriatic Sea and the Ionian Sea that makes up the entire west border of Albania, is home to increasingly rare populations of cetaceans. Nonetheless, the country has several cetacean species that live in the Albanian Mediterranean Sea.

The short-beaked common dolphin is known to inhabit coastal waters. The common bottlenose dolphin is abundant along the Albanian Adriatic Sea Coast especially in winter and spring seasons where they come to coastal areas to breed. Areas to protect the dolphin species were established in Buna River-Velipoja, Karaburun-Sazan, Ksamil Islands, Vjosa-Narta and other places. Therefore, the Cuvier's beaked whale has been recorded several times in Albanian waters.

The even-toed ungulates are represented by species such as the roe deer and chamois. Although found in the other nearby Balkan countries, red deer have been locally extinct in Albania for the better part of the 20th century, whereas fallow deer are only present in captivity.

=== Reptiles ===
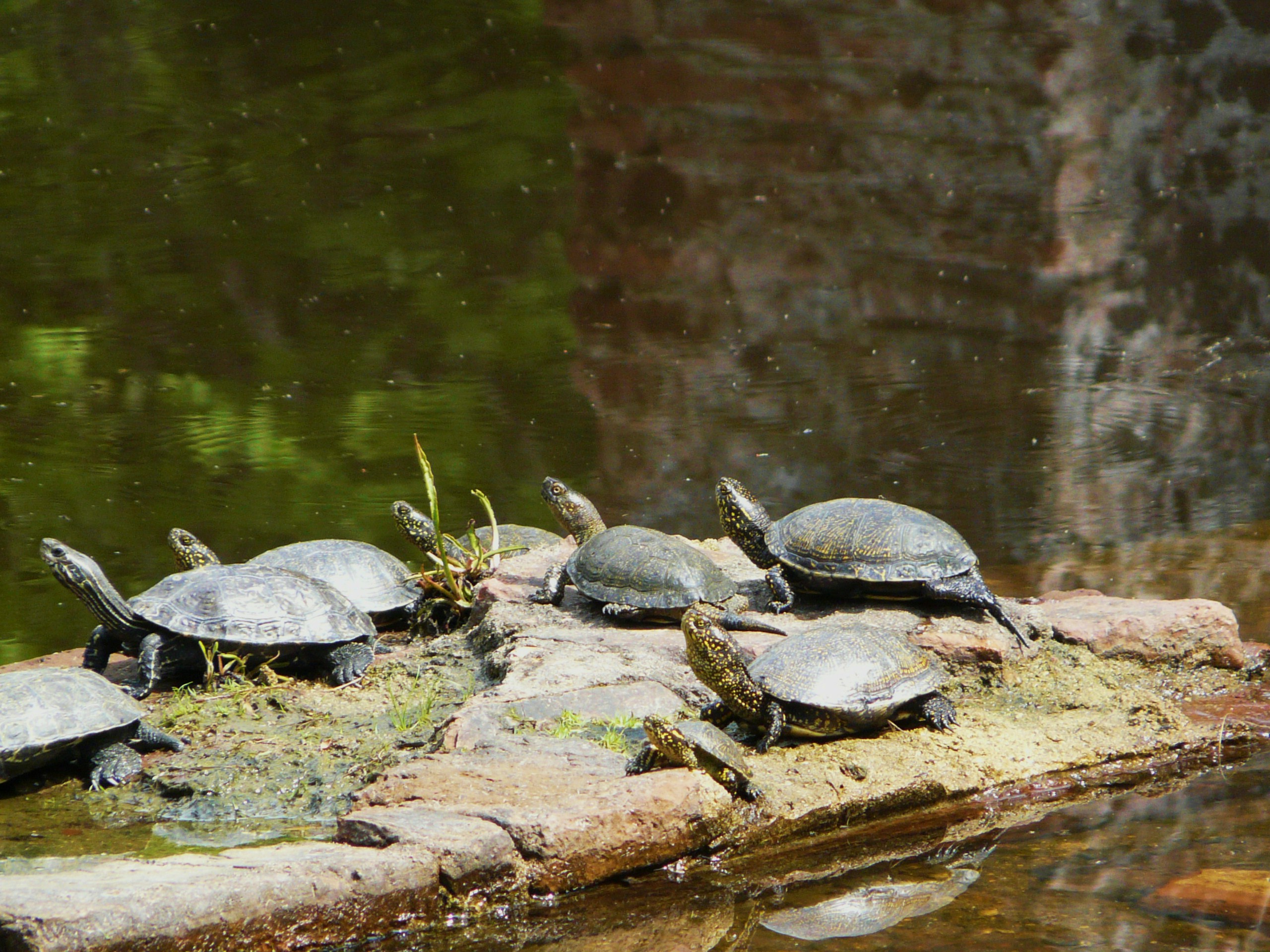
The European pond turtle in Butrint National Park.

Despite the fact that there are no exact studies, Albania ranks among the most important regions in the Balkan Peninsula in terms of reptiles with over thirty-seven species being recorded. Many of them are widespread particularly along the Albanian coasts that contains a wide diversity of habitats and ecosystems.

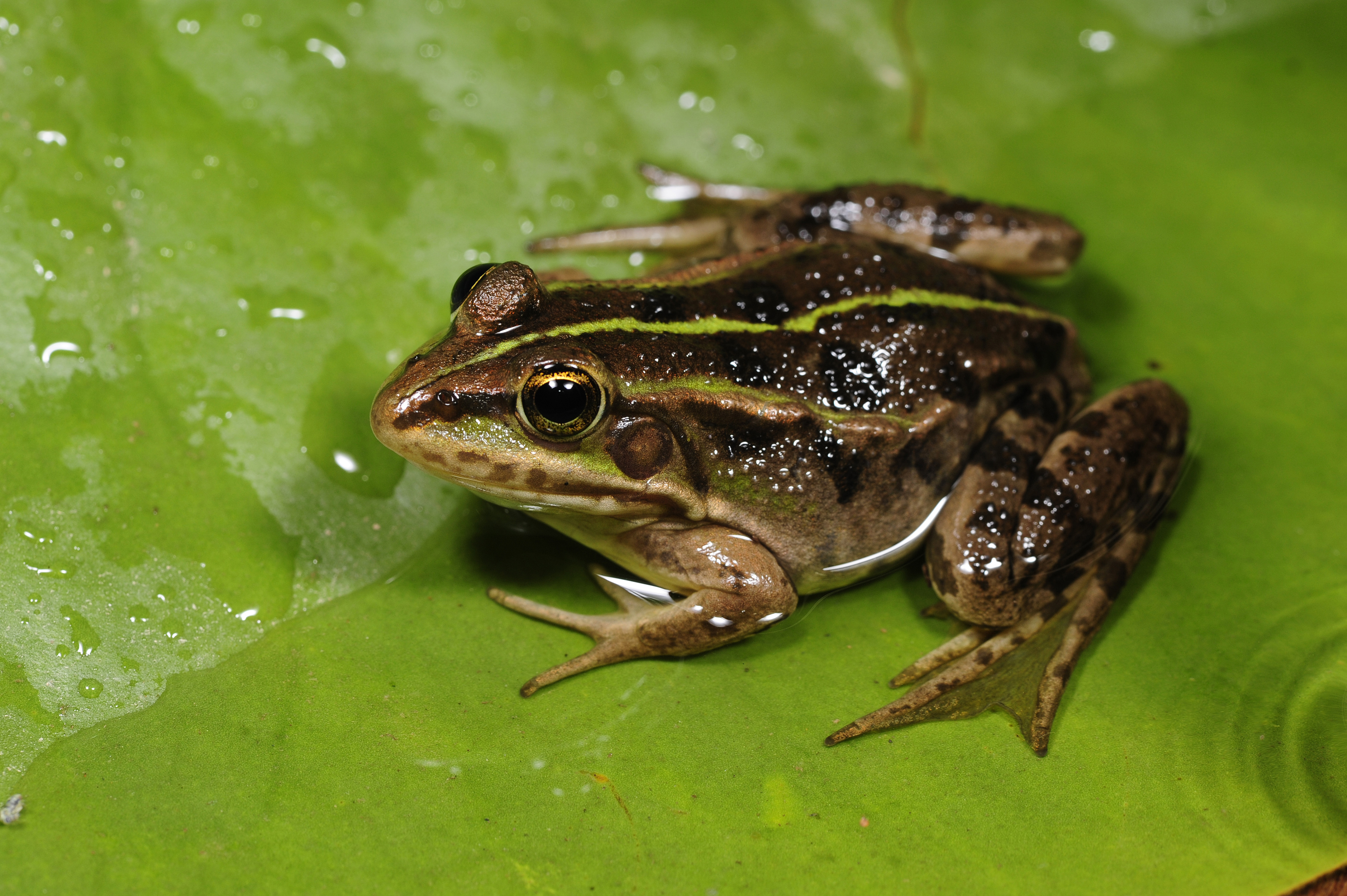
The Albanian frog is an endangered species according to the IUCN.

There are several species of sea turtle that nest on the country's beaches. The loggerhead turtle is a large oceanic turtle with flippers and a reddish-brown shell. The green sea turtle is another important species in the Mediterranean Sea and occasionally found in the Bay of Drin in the north and Bay of Vlorë in the south of Albania. The hawksbill sea turtle is one of the world's most endangered sea turtles and basically found in tropical waters around the world but also occasionally in Albania.

The territory of Albania is populated by two important species of freshwater turtles such as the European pond turtle and the Balkan pond turtle. One of the best-known turtles of Albania is the Hermann's tortoise which is relatively abundant throughout the country. Lizards are also found in the country. Large lizards such as the European green lizard, Balkan green lizard, Mediterranean house gecko and blue-throated keeled lizard are probably the country's most regularly encountered reptiles.

=== Fish ===
Albania has approximately 249 fish species in its coastal waters and 64 freshwater species in its rivers and lakes. Even though fish of marine and freshwaters can be found in various parts of waters throughout the country. The Adriatic and Ionian Sea inside the Mediterranean Sea are home of salt water fish, while fresh water fish occurs on Lake Butrint, Lake Shkodër, Lake Ohrid, Lake Prespa as well as in Karavasta Lagoon, Narta Lagoon and Patos Lagoon.

Lake Ohrid, Europe's oldest lake, is located between Albania and North Macedonia. As one of the world's few ancient lakes, it is the lake which contains the largest number of endemic species in the world, with 212 species of animals and plants. It is the habitat for many rare fish species such as the endangered Ohrid trout, one of the most ancient trout in the entire Balkan Peninsula.

With more than 28 species identified, out of 38 species which were recorded for the entire Adriatic Sea, the diversity of sharks in Albania is among the most abundant in the Balkans. Among the most important and common species are the small-spotted catshark, nursehound, common smooth-hound, longnose spurdog, spiny dogfish, angelshark and common thresher.

== Protected areas ==
Numerous parts of Albania are protected in accordance with a number of national and international designations due to their natural, historical or cultural value. Protected areas belong to the most important instruments of conservation which in turn contributes effectively to the maintenance of species, habitats and ecosystems.

The country has currently fifteen designated national parks, whereby one is specified as a marine park. Ranging from the Adriatic Sea and the Ionian Sea to the Albanian Alps and the Ceraunian Mountains, they possesses landscapes constituting habitats to thousands of plant and animal species. Butrint, Divjakë-Karavasta, Karaburun-Sazan, Llogara, Prespa, Shebenik-Jabllanicë, and Alps of Albania are among the most notable national parks of the country.

== Gallery ==
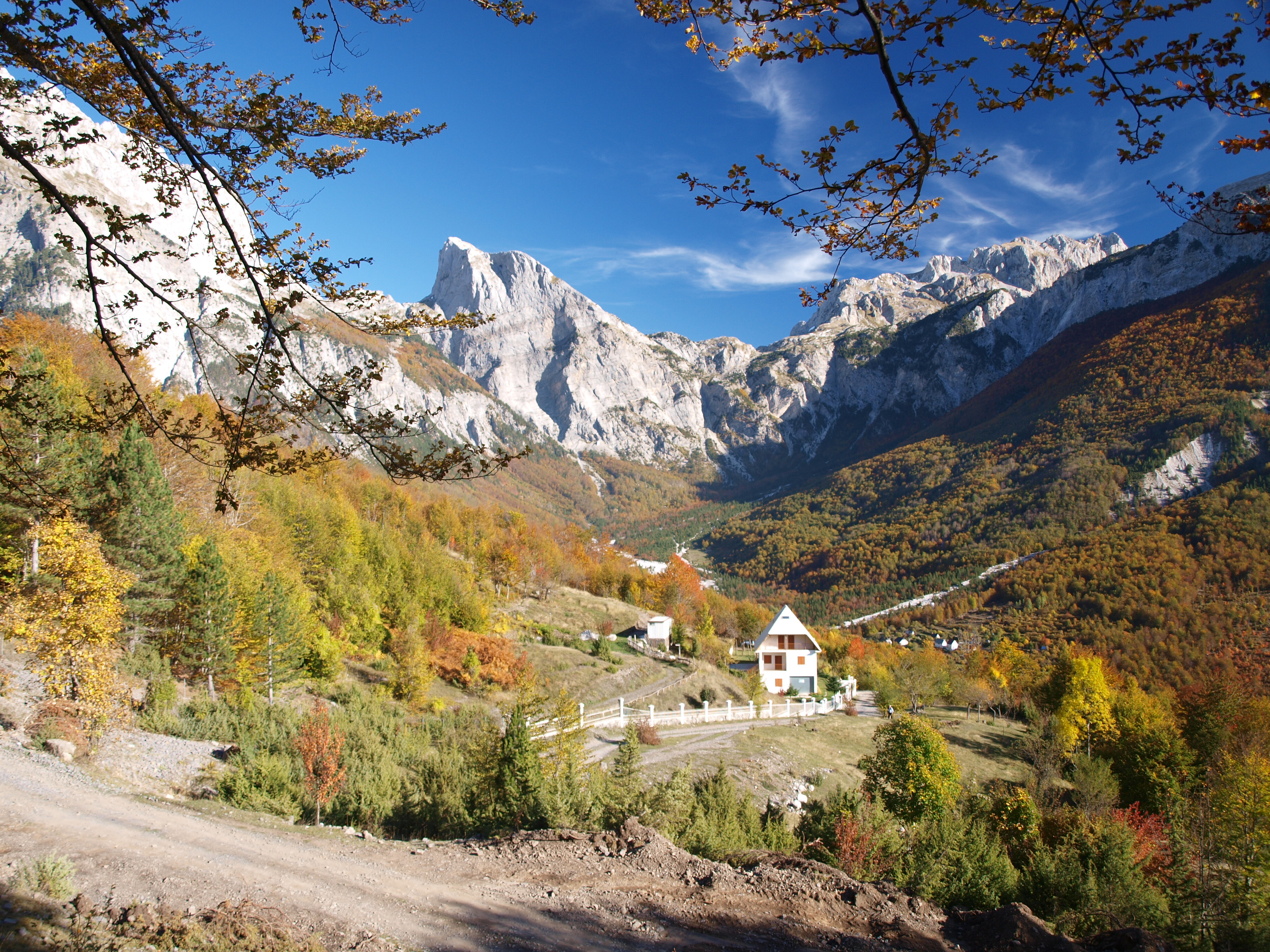
Theth National Park
21 November 1966

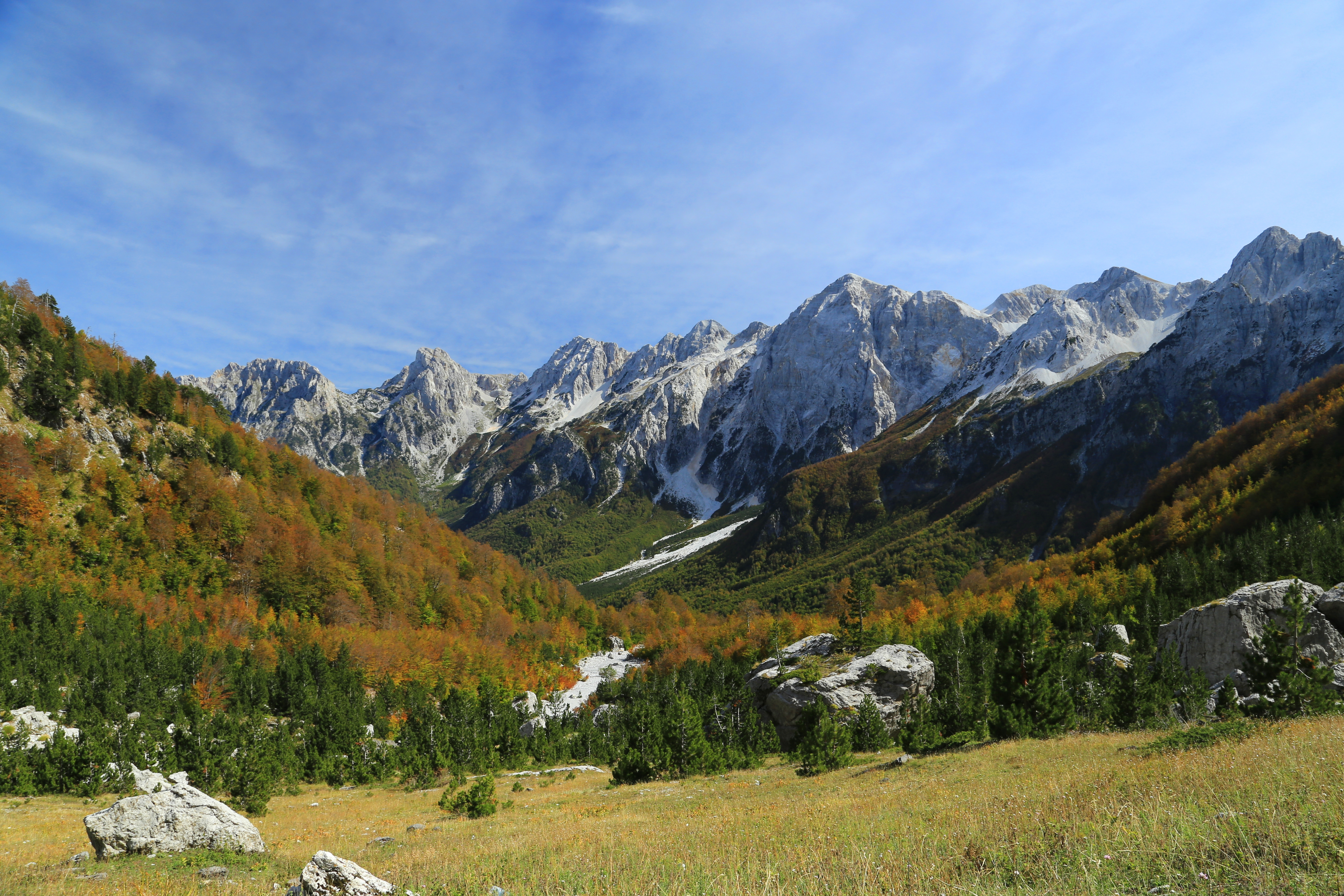
Valbonë Valley National Park
15 January 1996

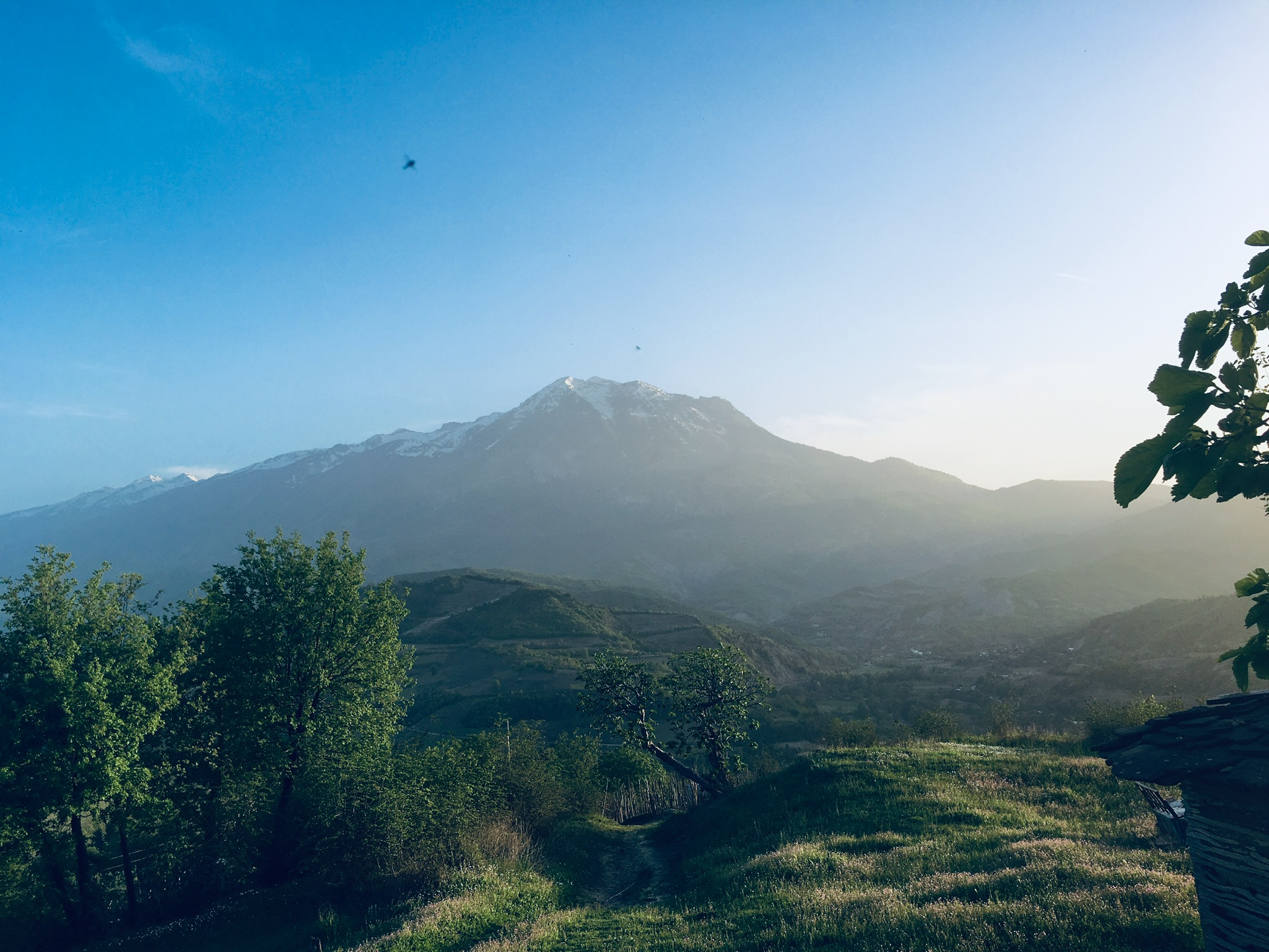
Tomorr National Park
18 July 2012

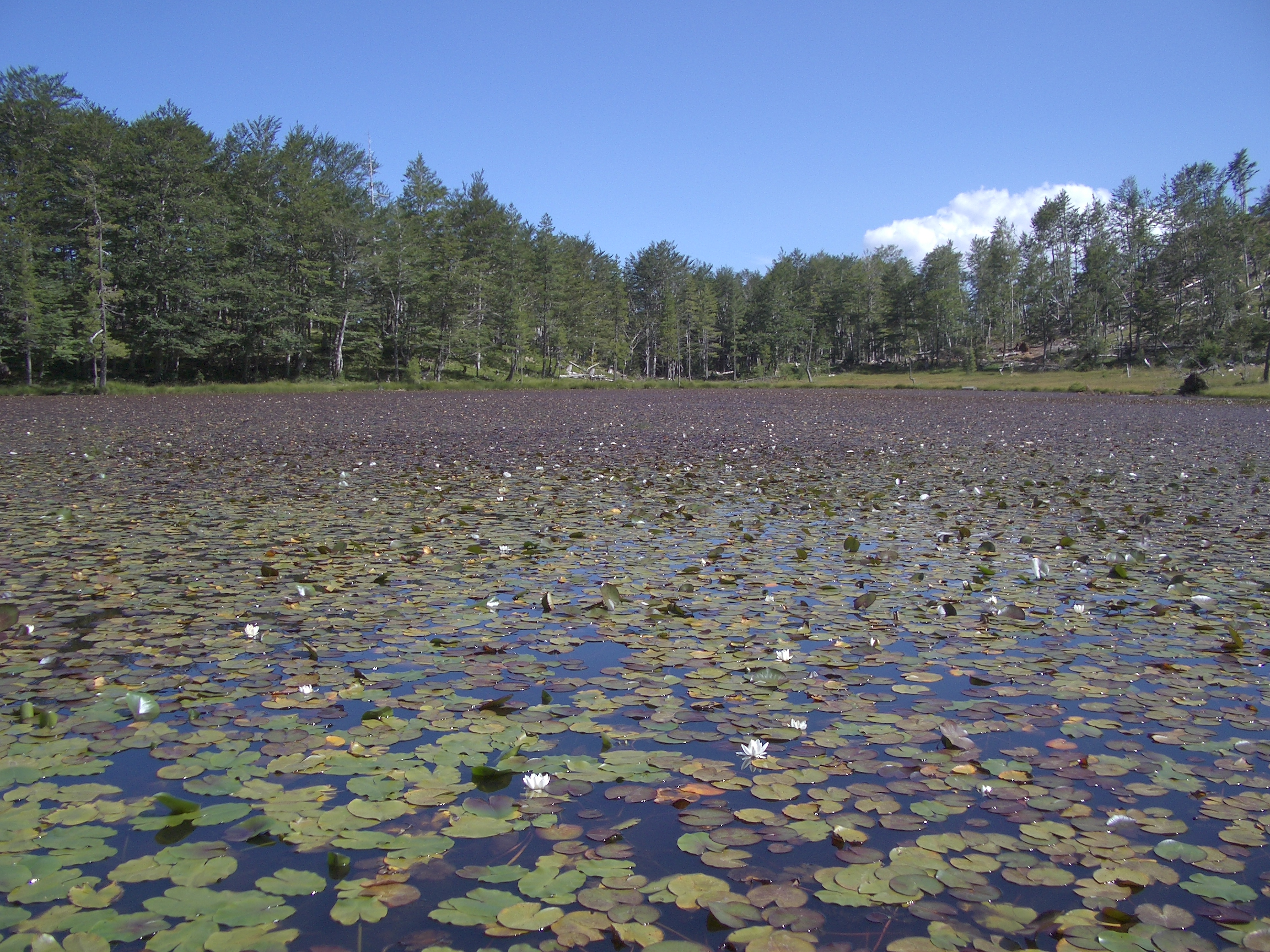
Lurë National Park
31 October 2018

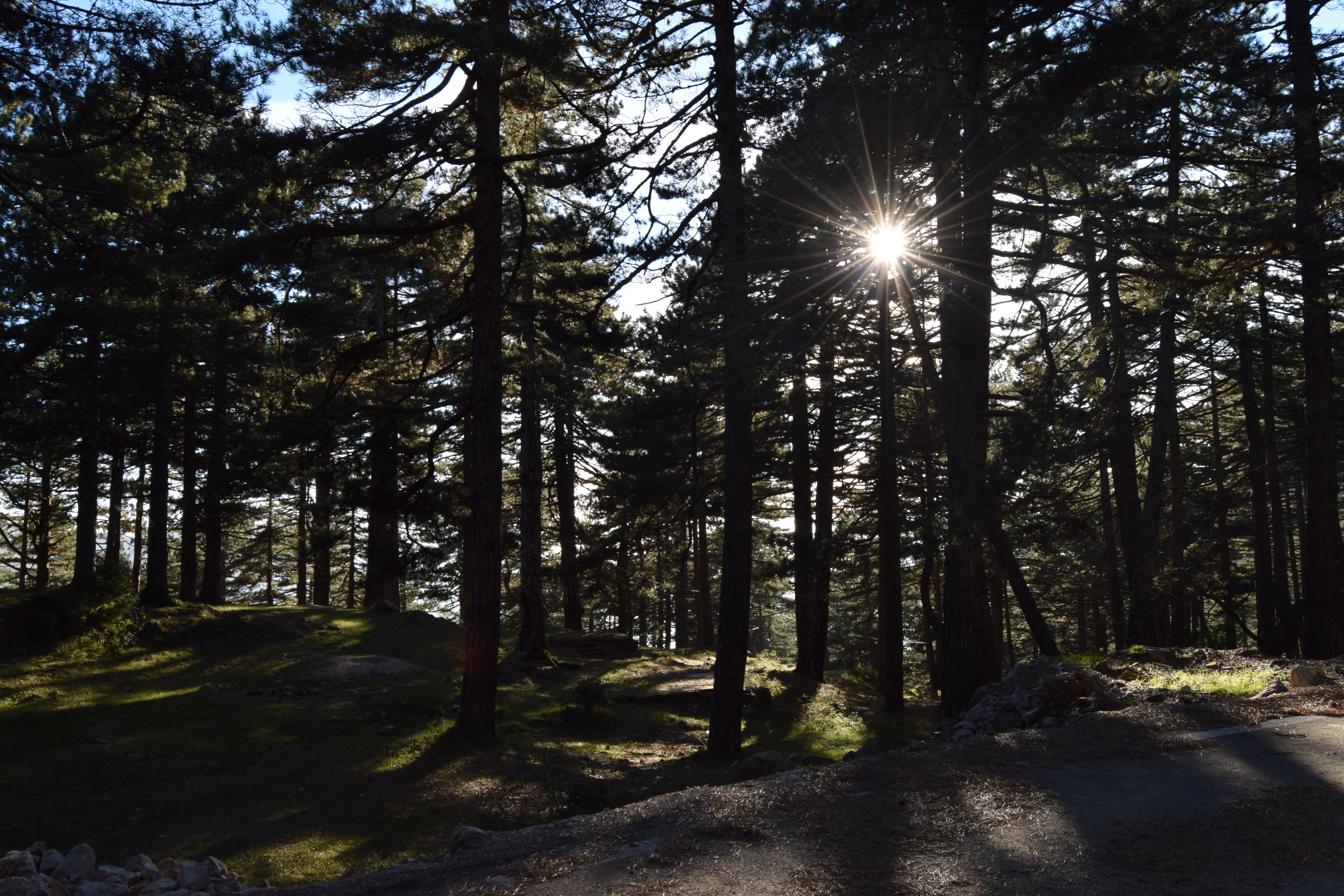
Shtamë Pass National Park
15 January 1996

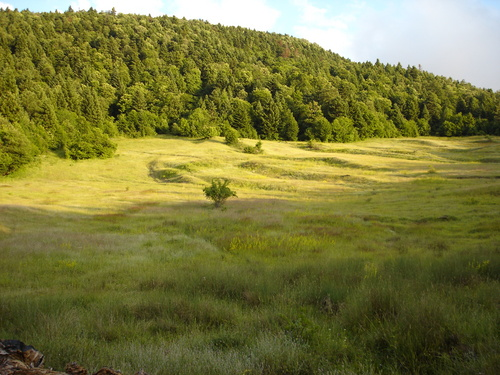
Fir of Hotovë-Dangelli National Park
17 December 2008

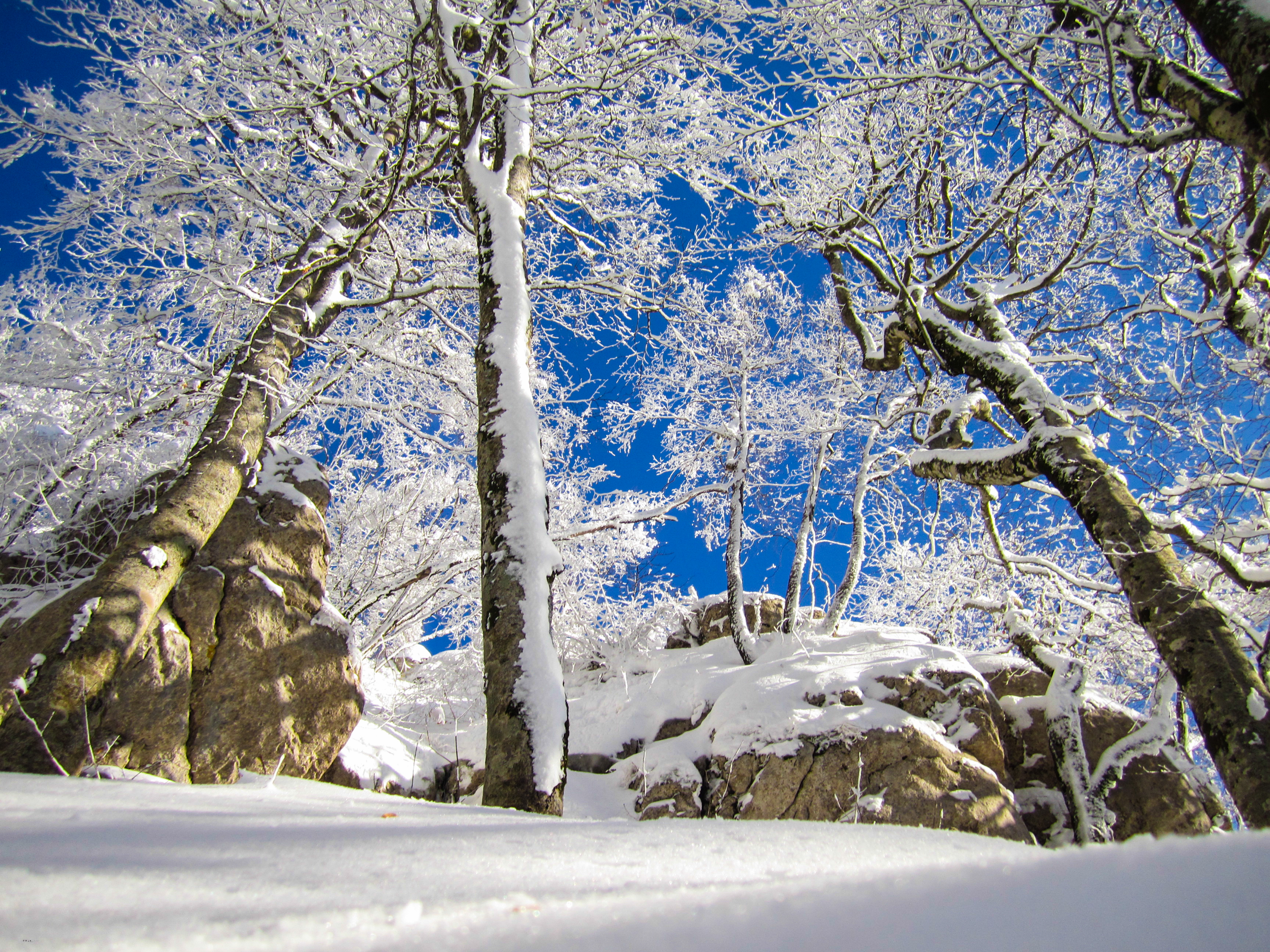
Dajti National Park
16 December 1960

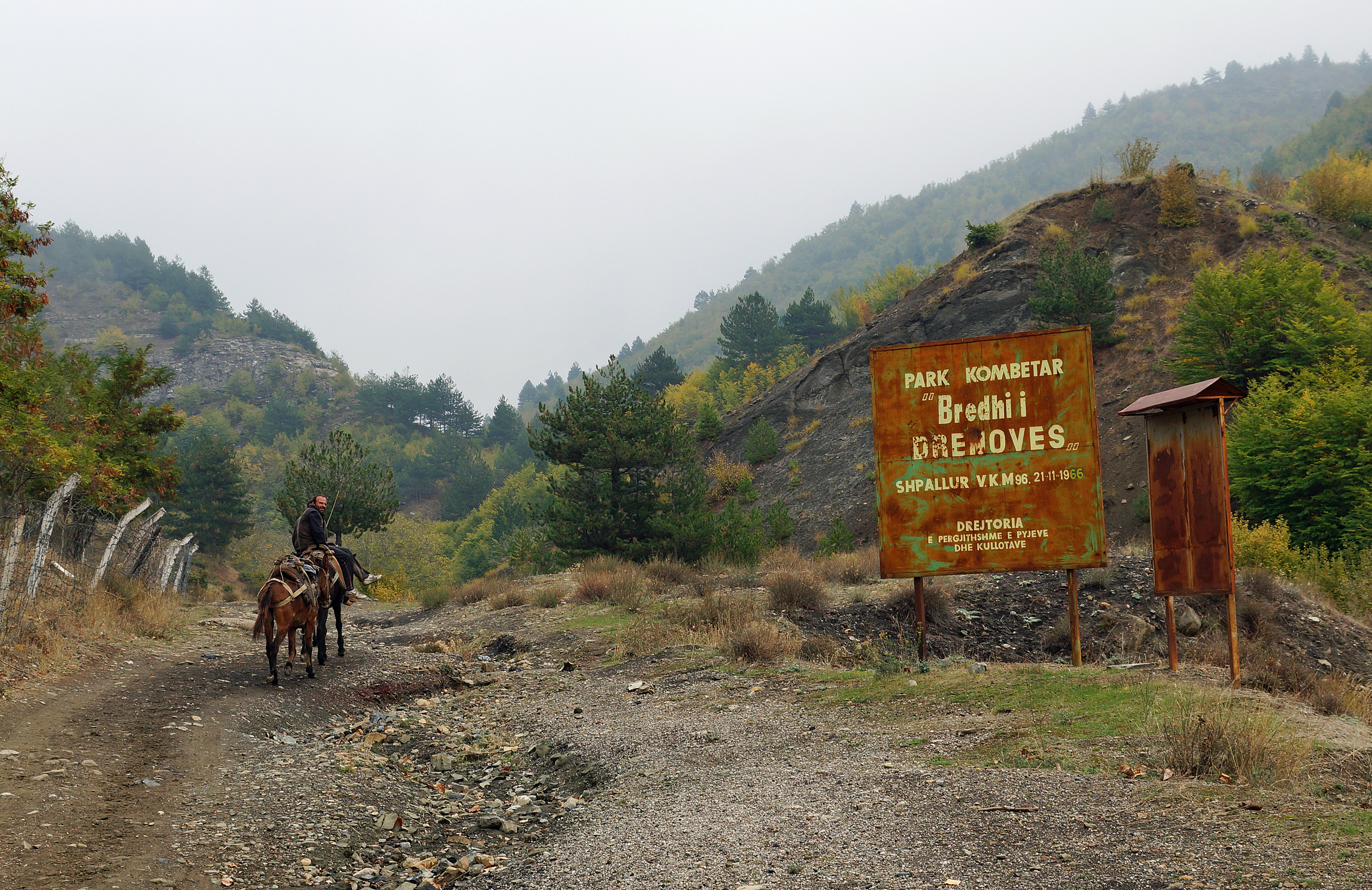
Fir of Drenovë National Park
21 November 1966

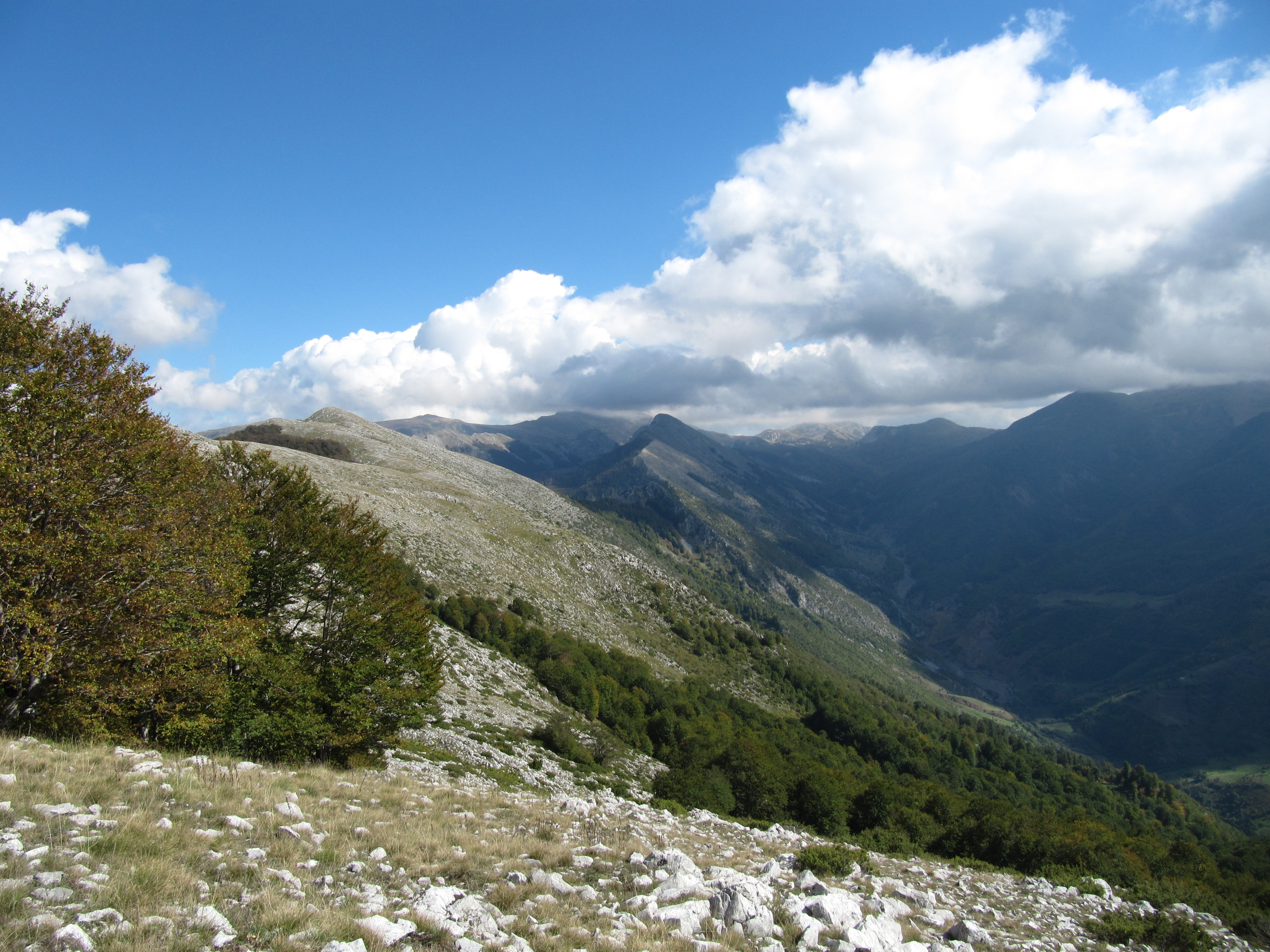
Shebenik-Jabllanicë National Park
21 May 2008

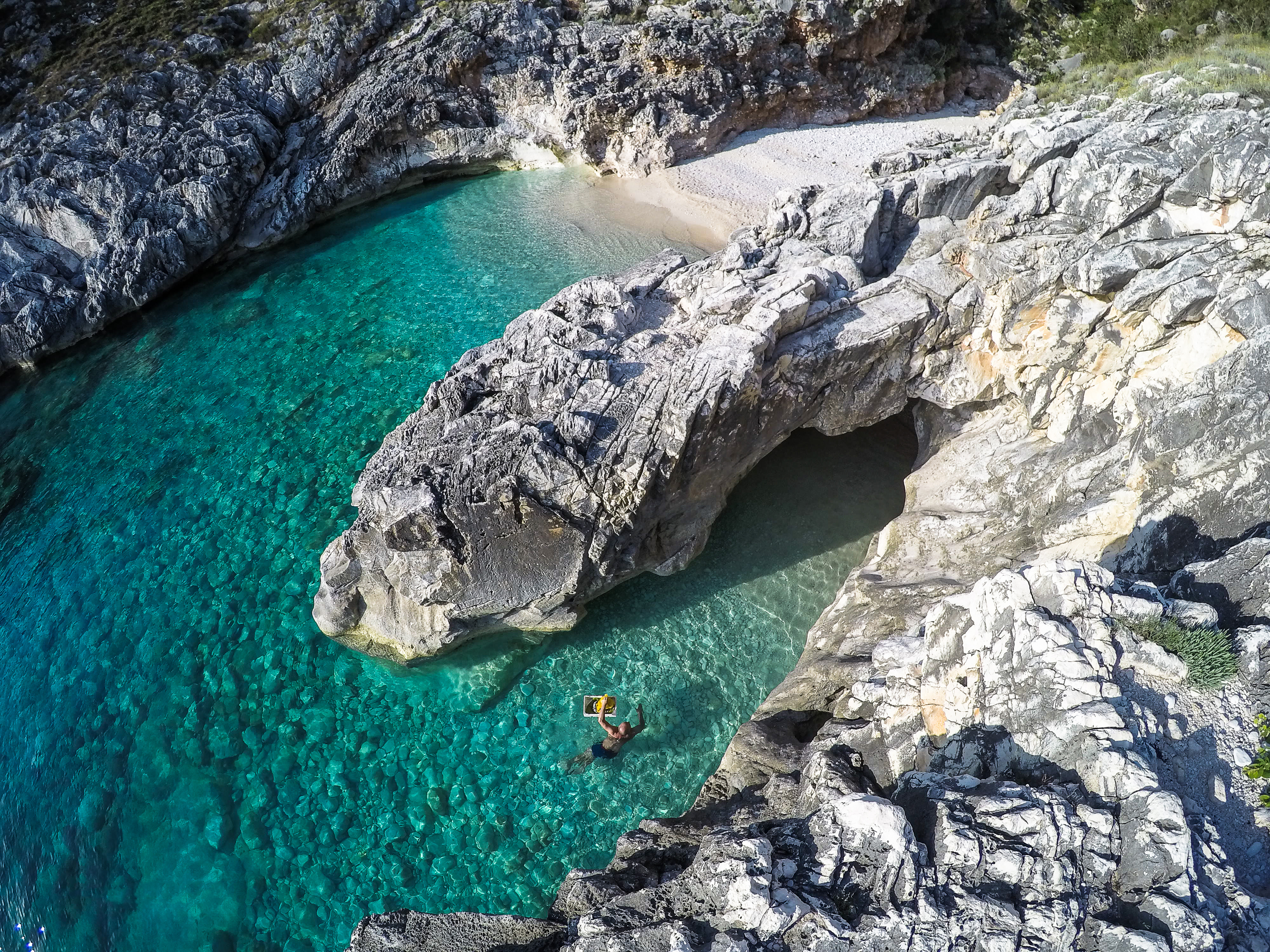
Karaburun-Sazan Marine Park
28 April 2010

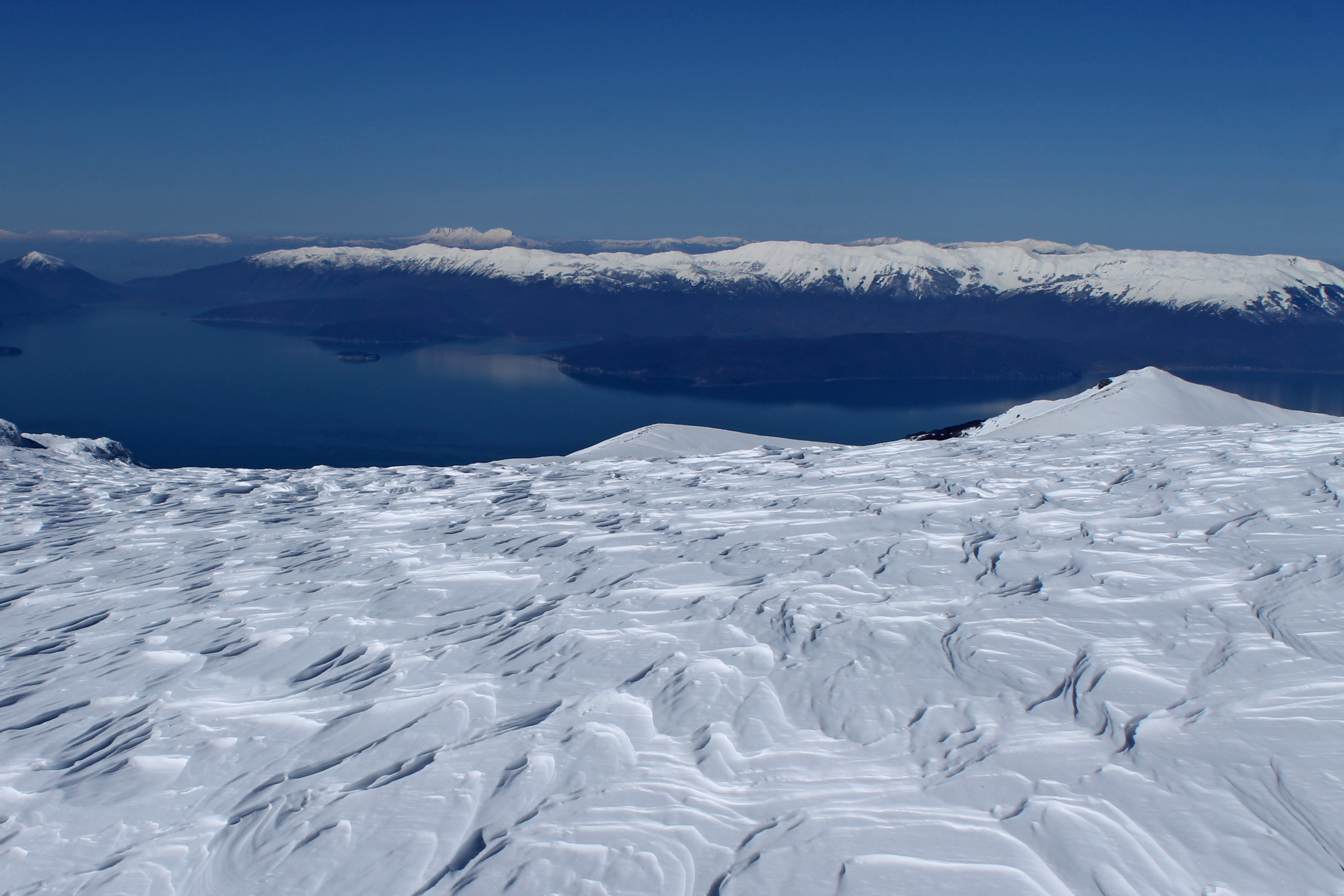
Prespa National Park
18 February 1999

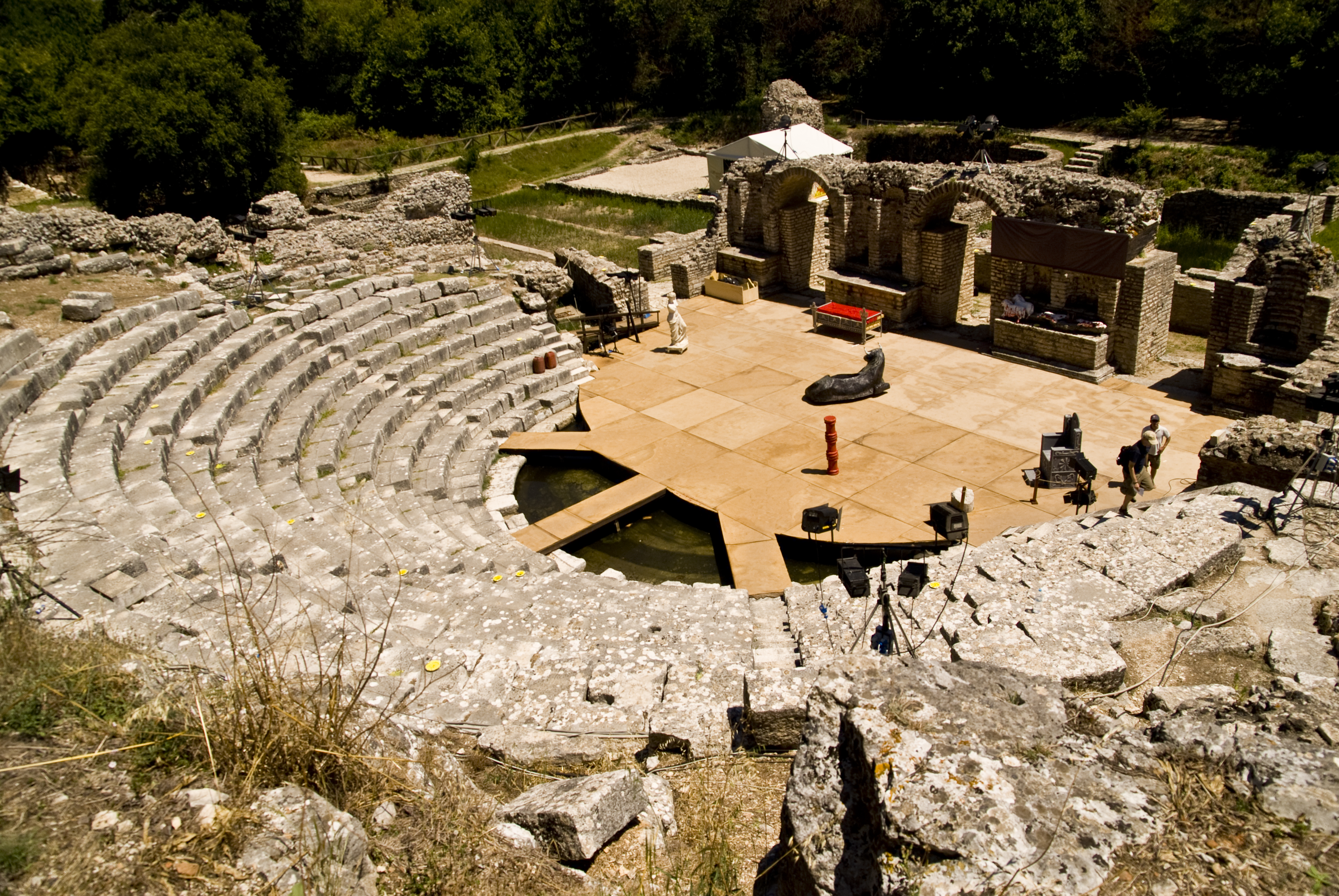
Butrint National Park
2 March 2000

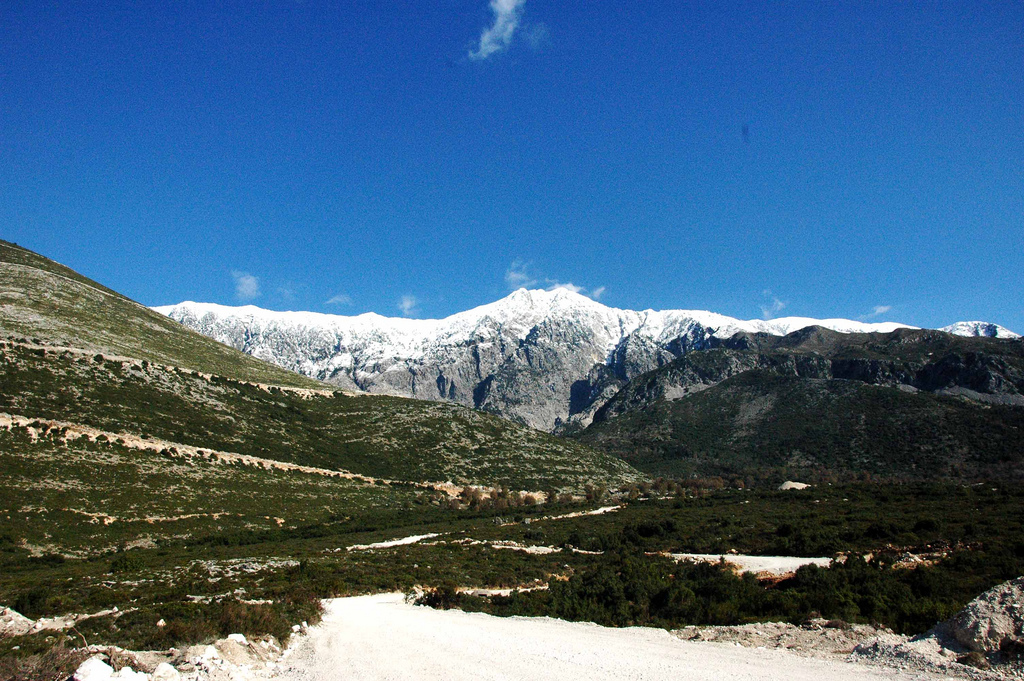
Llogara National Park
21 November 1966

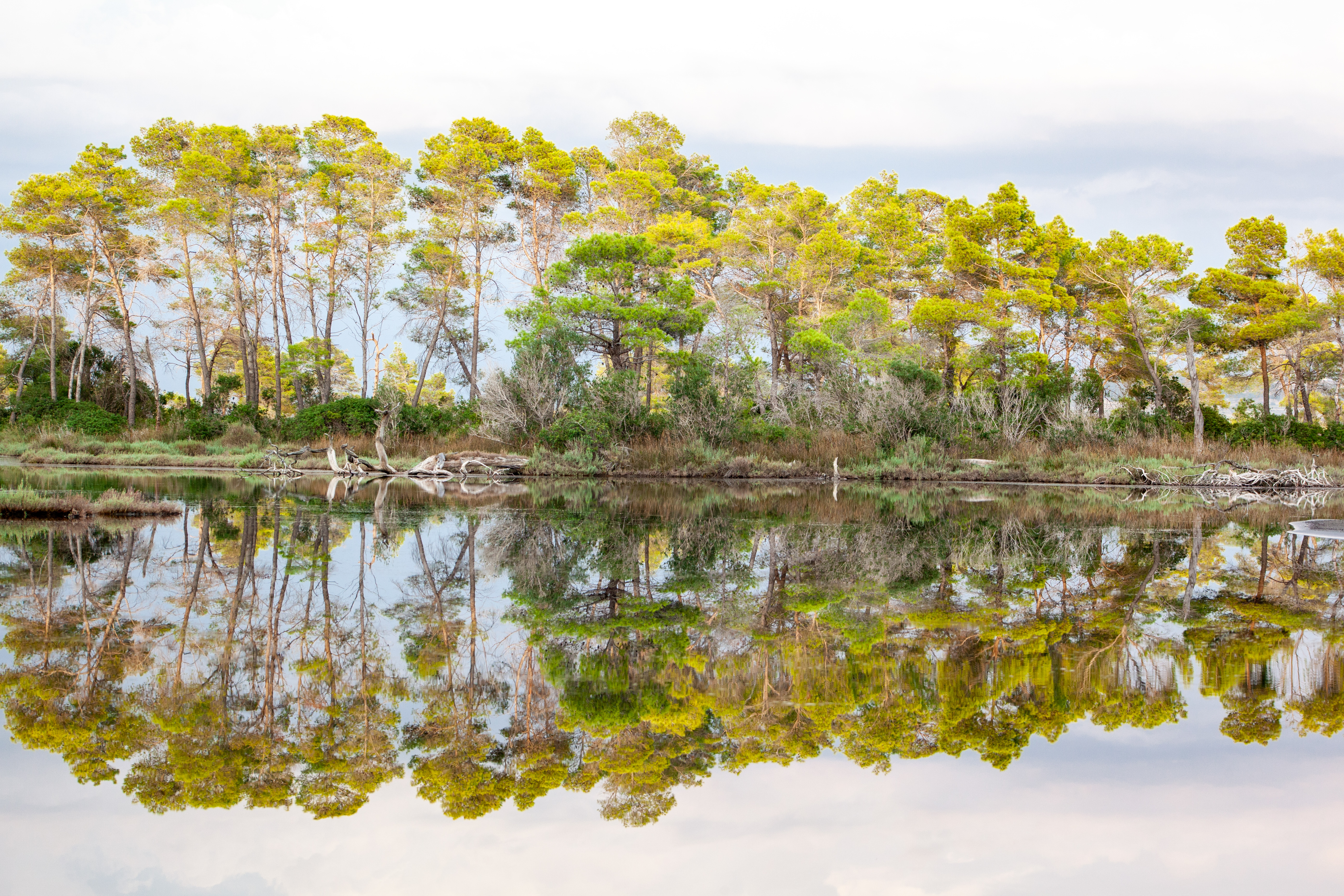
Divjakë-Karavasta National Park
19 October 2007

== See also ==
- Geography of Albania
- Protected areas of Albania
- Albanian Adriatic and Ionian Sea Coast
