= Climate of Albania =

Köppen climate classification types of Albania. Hot Mediterranean climate Warm Mediterranean climate Subtropical climate Oceanic climate Continental climate Subarctic climate

Albania has a variety of climate systems. With its coastline facing the Adriatic and Ionian seas in the Mediterranean sea, its highlands backed upon the elevated Balkan landmass, and the entire country lying at a latitude subject to a variety of weather patterns during the winter and summer seasons, however it has a high number of climatic regions for such a small area. The coastal lowlands have typically mediterranean climate while the highlands have a continental climate. In both the lowlands and the interior, the weather varies markedly from north to south.

Under the Köppen climate classification, the country has Hot Mediterranean climate, Warm Mediterranean climate, Subtropical climate, Oceanic climate, Continental climate and Subarctic climate.

== Overview ==
The lowlands have mild winters, averaging about 8 °C (46 °F). Humidity is mostly high with lots of rain. Mountainous regions have many snow days. Summer temperatures average 33 °C (91 °F), humidity is low. Many times, local thunderstorms occur in mountainous regions, characterized by heavy local downpours and strong local winds.

Inland temperatures are affected more by differences in elevation than by latitude or any other factor. Low winter temperatures in the mountains are caused by the continental air mass that dominates the weather in Eastern Europe and the Balkans. Northerly and northeasterly winds blow much of the time. From October to April, when a low pressure comes from the west, the Sirocco wind blows. The low pressure pulls warm and dry air from Sahara. When this air mass goes above the Mediterranean Sea, it fills up with moisture and makes rainy and warm conditions in Albania and in other places in Southern Europe. Average summer temperatures are lower than in the coastal areas in mountainous areas and much lower at higher elevations, but daily fluctuations are greater. Daytime maximum temperatures in the interior basins and river valleys are very high, but the nights are almost always cool. Lowlands are hot and dry in summer. In lowlands the day sea wind blows at day and night land wind at night. Rain is getting rarer in these areas in summer.

Average precipitation is heavy, a result of the convergence of the prevailing airflow from the Mediterranean Sea and the continental air mass. Because they usually meet at the point where the terrain rises, the heaviest rain falls in the central uplands. Vertical currents initiated when the Mediterranean air is uplifted also cause frequent thunderstorms. Many of these storms are accompanied by high local winds and torrential downpours. When the continental air mass is weak, Mediterranean winds drop their moisture farther inland. When there is a dominant continental air mass, cold air spills onto the lowland areas, which occurs most frequently in the winter. Because the season's lower temperatures damage olive trees and citrus fruits, groves and orchards are restricted to sheltered places with southern and western exposures, even in areas with high average winter temperatures.

Lowland rainfall averages from 1,000 millimeters (39.37 in) to more than 1,500 millimeters (59.06 in) annually, with the higher levels in the north. Nearly 95% of the rain falls in the winter.

Rainfall in the upland mountain ranges is heavier. Adequate records are not available, and estimates vary widely, but annual averages are probably about 1,800 millimeters (70.87 in) and are as high as 2,550 millimeters (100.39 in) in some northern areas. The seasonal variation is not quite as great in the coastal area.

The higher inland mountains receive less precipitation than the intermediate uplands. Terrain differences cause wide local variations, but the seasonal distribution is the most consistent of any area.

| | Jan | Feb | Mar | Apr | May | Jun | Jul | Aug | Sep | Oct | Nov | Dec |
| Avg low (°C/°F) | 0 °C; 32.0 °F | 2 °C; 36 °F | 5 °C; 41 °F | 10 °C; 50.0 °F | 16 °C; 60.8 °F | 19 °C; 66.2 °F | 21 °C; 69.8 °F | 20 °C; 68.0 °F | 16 °C; 60.8 °F | 11 °C; 52 °F | 5 °C; 41.0 °F | 2 °C; 36 °F |
| Avg high (°C/°F) | 8 °C; 46.4 °F | 11 °C; 51.8 °F | 15 °C; 59 °F | 19 °C; 66.2 °F | 26 °C; 78.8 °F | 30 °C; 86.0 °F | 33 °C; 91.4 °F | 31 °C; 87.8 °F | 26 °C; 78.8 °F | 20 °C; 68.0 °F | 15 °C; 59.0 °F | 11 °C; 51.8 °F |
| Humidity in % | 71 | 69 | 68 | 69 | 67 | 57 | 42 | 42 | 54 | 67 | 75 | 73 |
| Sunshine (h/day) | 5 | 5 | 6 | 7 | 10 | 15 | 18 | 16 | 12 | 7 | 5 | 5 |
| Precipitation in days | 13 | 13 | 14 | 13 | 10 | 7 | 5 | 4 | 6 | 9 | 16 | 17 |
Spring: Climate data

Climate data for Tirana (7) (Note: Elevation at 90 m (300 ft)) 1961-1990 normals and extremes 1940-present (Note: The monthly estimations for rainy and snowy days are not available, only annual.)
| Month | Jan | Feb | Mar | Apr | May | Jun | Jul | Aug | Sep | Oct | Nov | Dec | Year |
|---|---|---|---|---|---|---|---|---|---|---|---|---|---|
| Record high °C (°F) | 21.3 (70.3) | 28.0 (82.4) | 30.3 (86.5) | 32.6 (90.7) | 35.9 (96.6) | 39.7 (103.5) | 42.2 (108.0) | 41.4 (106.5) | 39.7 (103.5) | 36.1 (97.0) | 31.3 (88.3) | 22.5 (72.5) | 42.2 (108.0) |
| Mean daily maximum °C (°F) | 11.6 (52.9) | 12.9 (55.2) | 15.6 (60.1) | 19.0 (66.2) | 23.8 (74.8) | 27.7 (81.9) | 30.7 (87.3) | 30.7 (87.3) | 27.3 (81.1) | 21.8 (71.2) | 17.1 (62.8) | 13.0 (55.4) | 21.0 (69.8) |
| Daily mean °C (°F) | 6.7 (44.1) | 7.8 (46.0) | 10.0 (50.0) | 13.4 (56.1) | 18.0 (64.4) | 21.6 (70.9) | 24.0 (75.2) | 23.8 (74.8) | 20.7 (69.3) | 16.0 (60.8) | 11.7 (53.1) | 8.1 (46.6) | 15.2 (59.4) |
| Mean daily minimum °C (°F) | 1.8 (35.2) | 2.6 (36.7) | 4.5 (40.1) | 7.9 (46.2) | 12.1 (53.8) | 15.6 (60.1) | 17.2 (63.0) | 16.9 (62.4) | 14.1 (57.4) | 10.1 (50.2) | 6.3 (43.3) | 3.2 (37.8) | 9.4 (48.9) |
| Record low °C (°F) | −10.4 (13.3) | −9.4 (15.1) | −7.0 (19.4) | −1.0 (30.2) | 2.5 (36.5) | 5.6 (42.1) | 4.2 (39.6) | 10.0 (50.0) | 3.8 (38.8) | −1.3 (29.7) | −4.3 (24.3) | −6.9 (19.6) | −10.4 (13.3) |
| Average precipitation mm (inches) | 143 (5.6) | 132 (5.2) | 115 (4.5) | 104 (4.1) | 103 (4.1) | 68 (2.7) | 42 (1.7) | 46 (1.8) | 78 (3.1) | 114 (4.5) | 172 (6.8) | 148 (5.8) | 1,266 (49.8) |
| Average precipitation days (≥ 0.1 mm) | 13 | 13 | 14 | 13 | 12 | 7 | 5 | 4 | 6 | 9 | 16 | 16 | 128 |
| Average relative humidity (%) | 74 | 73 | 69 | 72 | 68 | 69 | 62 | 64 | 71 | 70 | 76 | 79 | 71 |
| Mean monthly sunshine hours | 124 | 125 | 165 | 191 | 263 | 298 | 354 | 327 | 264 | 218 | 127 | 88 | 2,544 |
| Average ultraviolet index | 2 | 2 | 4 | 6 | 8 | 9 | 9 | 8 | 6 | 4 | 2 | 1 | 5 |
Source: DWD, (Note: ftp://ftp-cdc.dwd.de/pub/CDC/help/stations_list_CLIMAT_data.txt Station ID for Tirana is 13615] Use this station ID to locate the sunshine duration) Meteo Climat (record highs and lows), NOAA (some records, rain and snow days) and Weather Atlas

== Climate change ==
Due to climate change Albania's average annual temperature is projected to rise by between 1.3°C and 2.2°C by 2050, with more frequent extreme heat events. Rainfall is expected to decrease by between 2.1% and 4.3%, while heavy rain events are predicted to become more frequent and intense.

== See also ==
- Geography of Albania
- Biodiversity of Albania
