= Lake Dashi =

- Location within Albania Location within Balkans Location within Europe
- Interactive map of Lake Dashi
- Location: Accursed Mountains
- Coordinates: 42°31′47″N 20°04′36″E
- Lake type: Glacial lake
- Basin countries: Albania
- Max. length: 0.25 km (0.16 mi)
- Max. width: 0.20 km (0.12 mi)
- Surface area: 3.5 ha (8.6 acres)
- Surface elevation: 2,180 m (7,150 ft)

Lake Dashi (Albanian: Liqeni i Dashit) is a mountain lake in Albania. It is located in the Accursed Mountains, near the border with Kosovo. It is one of the largest lakes found in the mountain range with an area a little more than 3.5 hectares (8.6 acres). In English, Liqeni i Dashit means "Stag's Lake".

== See also ==
- Lake Sylbicë
