= Liqeni i Dhenve =

Dhenve Lake
- Location within Albania Location within Balkans
- Interactive map of Dhenve Lake
- Location: Accursed Mountains
- Coordinates: 42°30′16″N 20°06′04″E
- Lake type: Glacial lake
- Basin countries: Albania
- Max. length: 100 m (330 ft)
- Max. width: 110 m (360 ft)
- Surface area: 0.8 ha (2.0 acres)
- Surface elevation: 2,050 m (6,730 ft)

Liqeni i Dhenve (meaning Lake of the Sheep in Albanian) is a small mountain lake in the north of Albania. Dhenve Lake is situated in the Accursed Mountains range near to the border with Kosovo. Dhenve Lake is a round lake, and the river that originates from it flows down into the Gashi River. It has a surface area of approximately 0.8 hectares (2.0 acres).
