= Lake Sylbicë =

- Location within Albania Location within Kosovo Location within Montenegro Location within Serbia Location within Balkans
- Interactive map of Lake Sylbicë
- Location: Accursed Mountains
- Coordinates: 42.526°N 20.090°E
- Lake type: Glacial lake
- Max. length: 0.22 km (0.14 mi)
- Max. width: 0.20 km (0.12 mi)
- Surface area: 2.8 ha (6.9 acres)
- Surface elevation: 2,090 m (6,860 ft)

Lake Sylbicë (Albanian: Liqeni i Sylbicës) is a large mountain lake in the Accursed Mountains range in the north of Albania with an area of 2.8 hectares (6.9 acres). It is about 1 km (0.62 mi) from the border with Kosovo. This lake is surrounded with meadows and is just east of the somewhat larger Lake Dash.
