= List of beaches in Albania =

Map of Albania's coastline with its beaches (2018)

The coastline of Albania features a wide variety of landforms, extending for approximately 450 km along the Adriatic and Ionian seas, including its islands.

The Adriatic coast is characterized by low-lying alluvial plains, extensive sandy beaches, coastal dunes, lagoons, wetlands and river deltas formed by sediment deposited by the country’s major rivers.

The Ionian coast is dominated by a rugged mountainous shoreline featuring rocky cliffs, marine terraces, pocket beaches, sea caves, coves and other karst landforms developed within uplifted limestone formations. Together, they form one of the most diverse littoral landscapes in the Mediterranean region.

== Adriatic coast ==
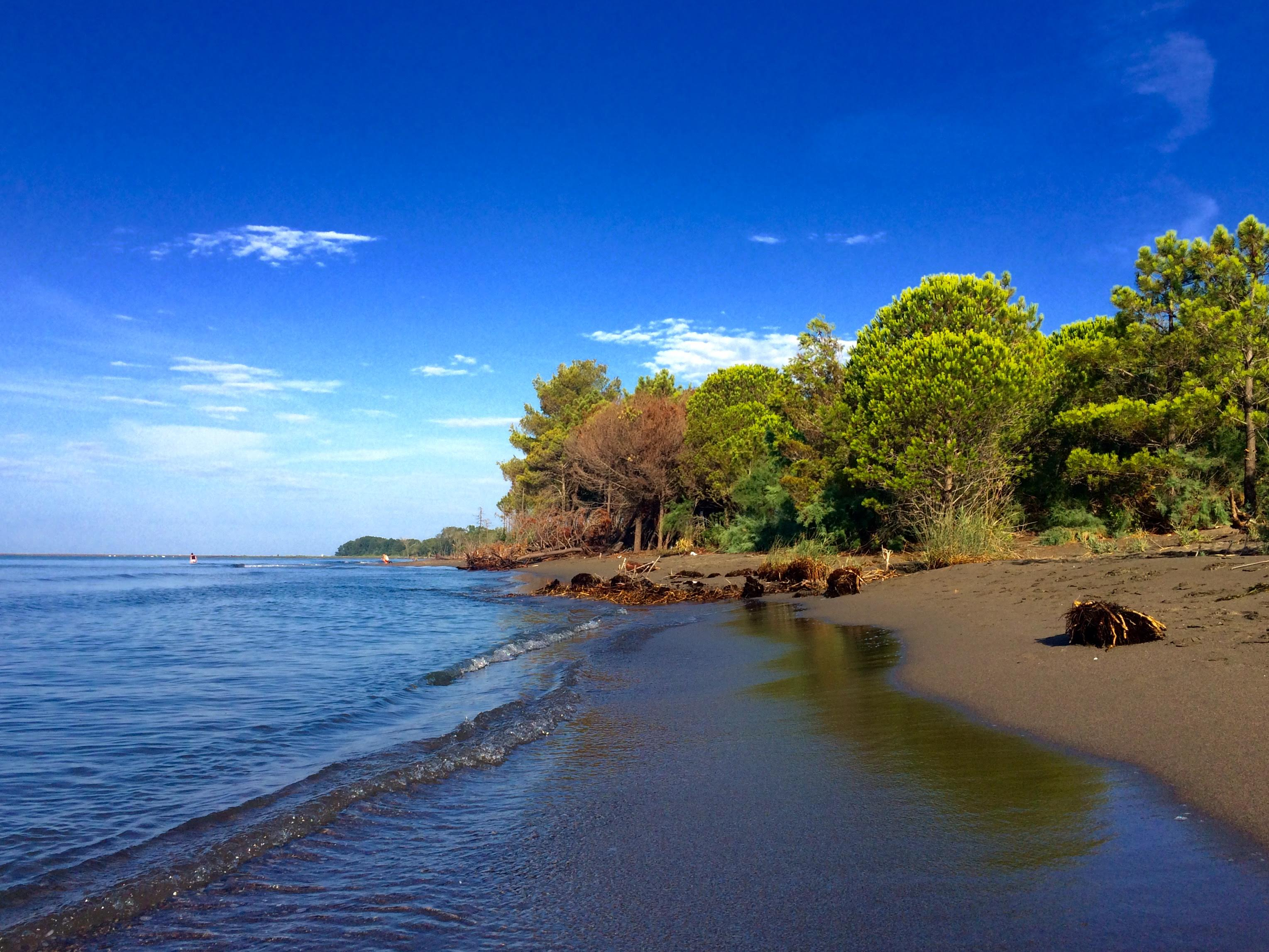
Velipojë

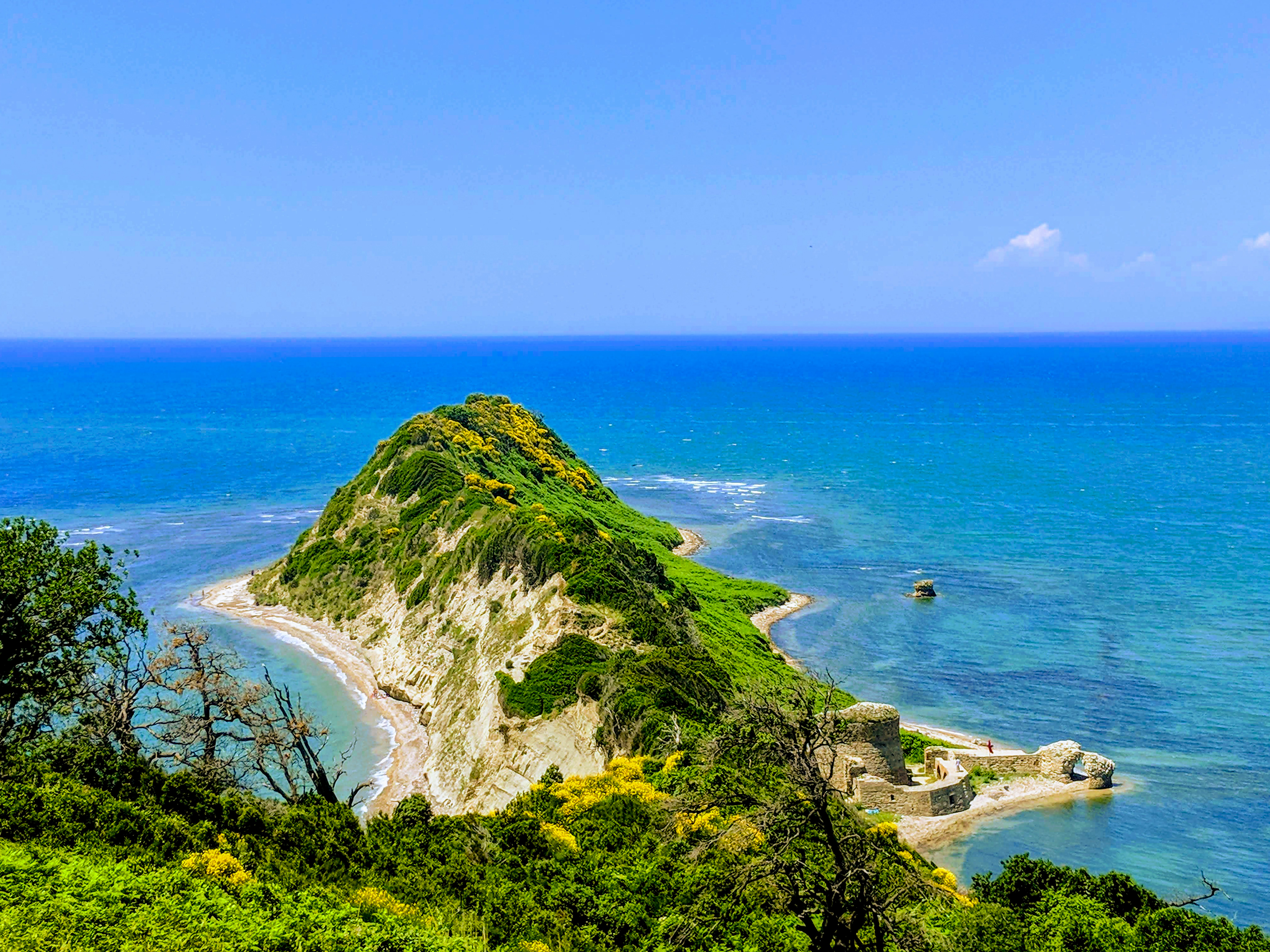
Rodoni Cape

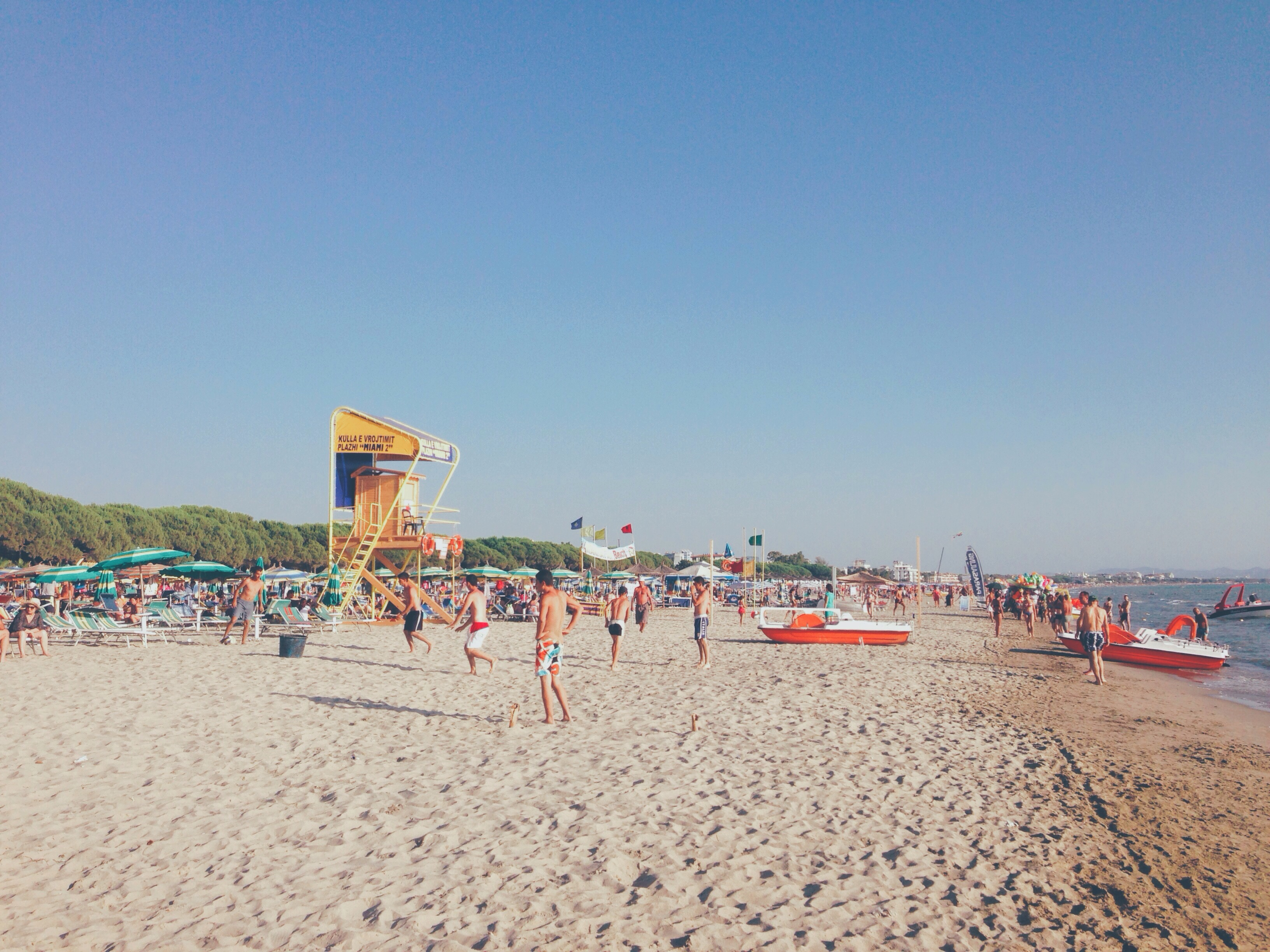
Golem

The Adriatic Sea forms the northern section of Albania's coastline, extending from the Buna River estuary to the Karaburun Peninsula, where it meets the Ionian Sea. As part of the larger Mediterranean Sea, it has played a significant role in Albania's physical geography, economy, transportation and settlement patterns.

Its 284 km (176 mi) coastline is generally low and flat, formed by the deposition of sediments carried by major rivers such as the Buna, Drin, Mat, Ishmi, Erzen, Shkumbin, Seman and Vjosa. Major coastal features include the bays of Vlorë, Durrës, Rodon and the gulf of Drin, as well as the lagoons of Viluni, Patok, Karavasta and Narta.

The Coastal Lowlands are the country's most important agricultural and industrial region. The principal ports of Durrës, Vlorë and Shëngjin are located along its shores and serve as key centers of trade, transport, fishing and tourism. Critical habitats for wildlife and migratory birds are found in the surrounding wetlands, lagoons and river deltas.

Sea-surface temperatures along the coast generally range from 23.4 to 25.1 °C in summer and from 11.1 to 14.3 °C in winter. Salinity varies between 36.5‰ and 39‰. Due to the exchange of water with the Ionian Sea through the Strait of Otranto, the waters off Albania are typically warmer and more saline than those along the opposite Italian coast.

=== Beaches ===
- Shkodër
  - Velipojë
  - Vilun
  - Baks-Rrjoll
- Lezhë
  - Kunë
  - Shëngjin
  - Rana e hedhun
  - Talë
  - Patok
- Durrës
  - Gjiri i Lalzit: Shën Pjetër, Hamallaj, Rrushkull
  - Kepi i Bishtit të Pallës
  - Kallm
  - Currila
  - Durrës Beach: Teuta, Iliria
  - Pishat e buta: Plepat
  - Shkëmbi i Kavajës
- Kavajë
  - Golem
  - Mali i Robit
  - Qerret
  - Karpen (Kepi i Bishtit të Barbaut)
  - Carinë (Gjiri i Forsilukut)
  - Kalaja e Turrës (Kepi i Lagjit)
  - Plazhi i Gjeneralit
  - Spille (Guri i lëmuar)
  - Greth
  - Vilë Bashtovë
- Lushnje
  - Divjakë
- Fier
  - Ndërnenas
  - Seman
  - Darëzezë e re
  - Pishë Poro

== Ionian coast ==
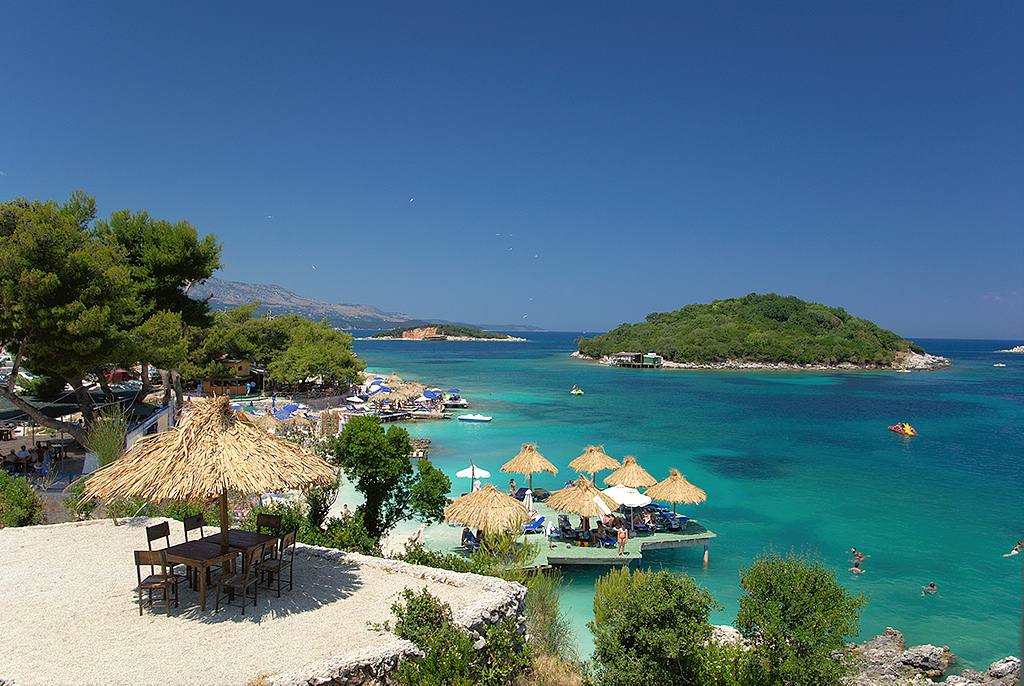
Ksamil

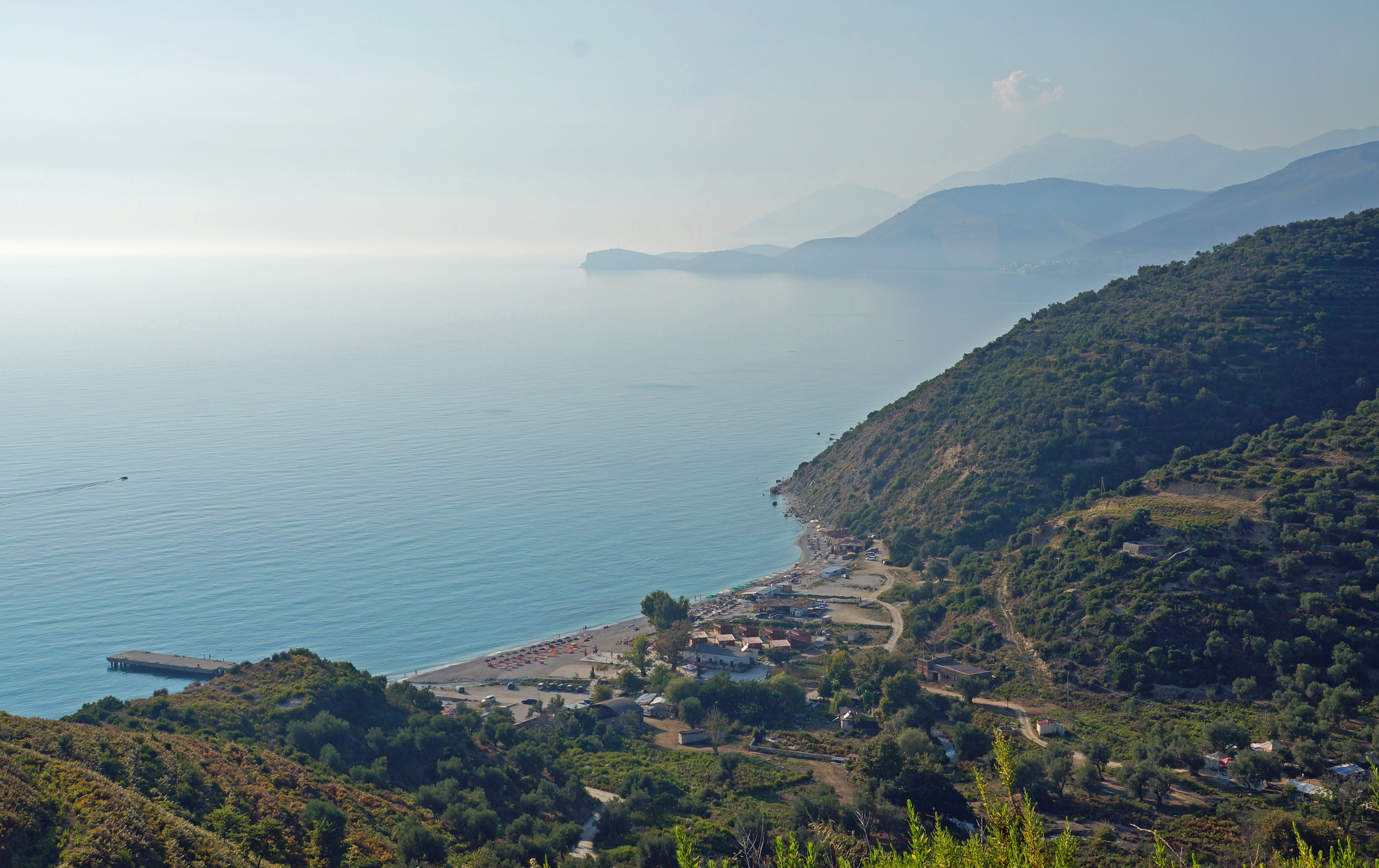
Bunec

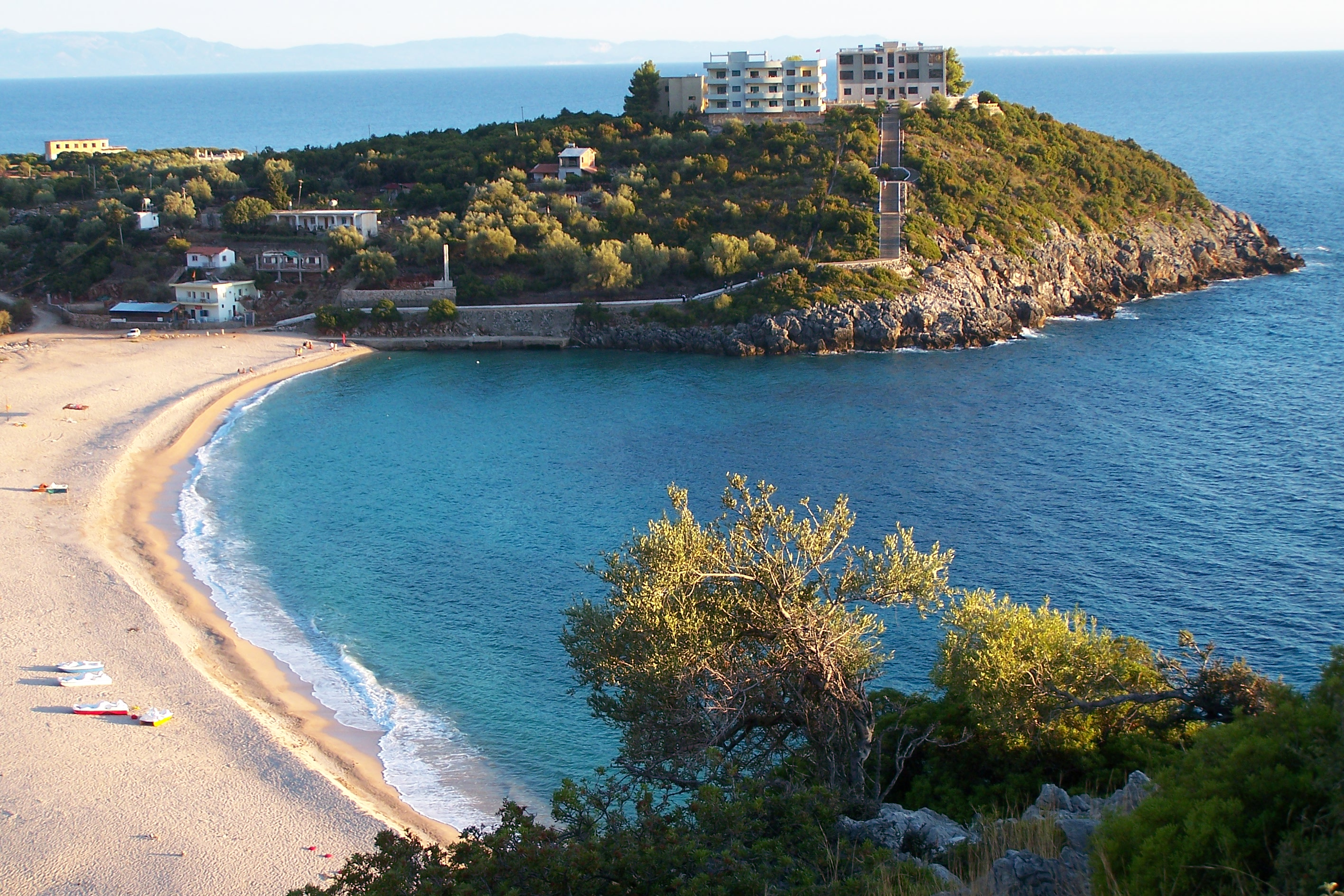
Jal

The Ionian Sea forms the southwestern maritime boundary of Albania, extending from Cape Stillo near the Greek border to the Karaburun Peninsula. Its 154 km (96 mi) coastline is known for its rugged relief, clear waters and scenic beaches.

The coast is predominantly rocky and highly indented, marked by numerous coves, headlands and bays, including Ftelia, Butrint, Sarandë, Kakome, Borsh, Porto Palermo (Panorma), Spile, Jal and Bristan (Arushë). It is home to the Albanian Riviera, renowned for its beaches, most notably those of Borsh, Himarë, Vuno and Dhërmi. The Ionian waters are characterized by their exceptional clarity, deep blue color, relatively high salinity and the steeply descending seabed. Surface water temperatures generally range from around 14 °C (57 °F) in winter to 25 °C (77 °F) in summer.

=== Beaches ===
- Vlorë
  - Plazhi i vjetër
  - Plazhi i ri
  - Uji i ftohtë
  - Karaburun (Shën Vasil)
  - Gjiri i Shën Janit
  - Gjiri i Shën Andreut
  - Gjiri i Nexhajve
  - Gjiri i Llovizit
  - Gjiri i Gramës
  - Gjiri i Dafinës
  - Gjiri i Ariut (Brisanit)
  - Plazhi i Admiralit (Gjiri i Japrakut - Sazan)
  - Zhiron
  - Jonufër
  - Zvërnec
  - Radhimë
  - Orikum
- Himarë
  - Perivol (Gjilek)
  - Shkambo
  - Jaliksar
  - Gjipe
  - Livadh (Fshati Himarë)
  - Spile
  - Potam
  - Strevijë
  - Llaman
  - Filikur
  - Skalomë (Qeparo)
  - Jal (Vuno)
  - Dhërmi
  - Dhraleo (Palasë)
- Sarandë
  - Lukovë
  - Borsh
  - Kakome
  - Krorëz
  - Piqeras (Bunec)
  - Lapardha
  - Plazhi i Shpellës
  - Plazhi i Sarandës (Limion, Pllaka, Plazhi i ri, Plazhi i Çentralit)
  - Pasqyrat
  - Ksamil
  - Manastiri
  - Pulëbardha
  - Tre Ishujt
  - Rilindja
  - Kështjella
  - Pema e thatë

== Lake Ohrid ==
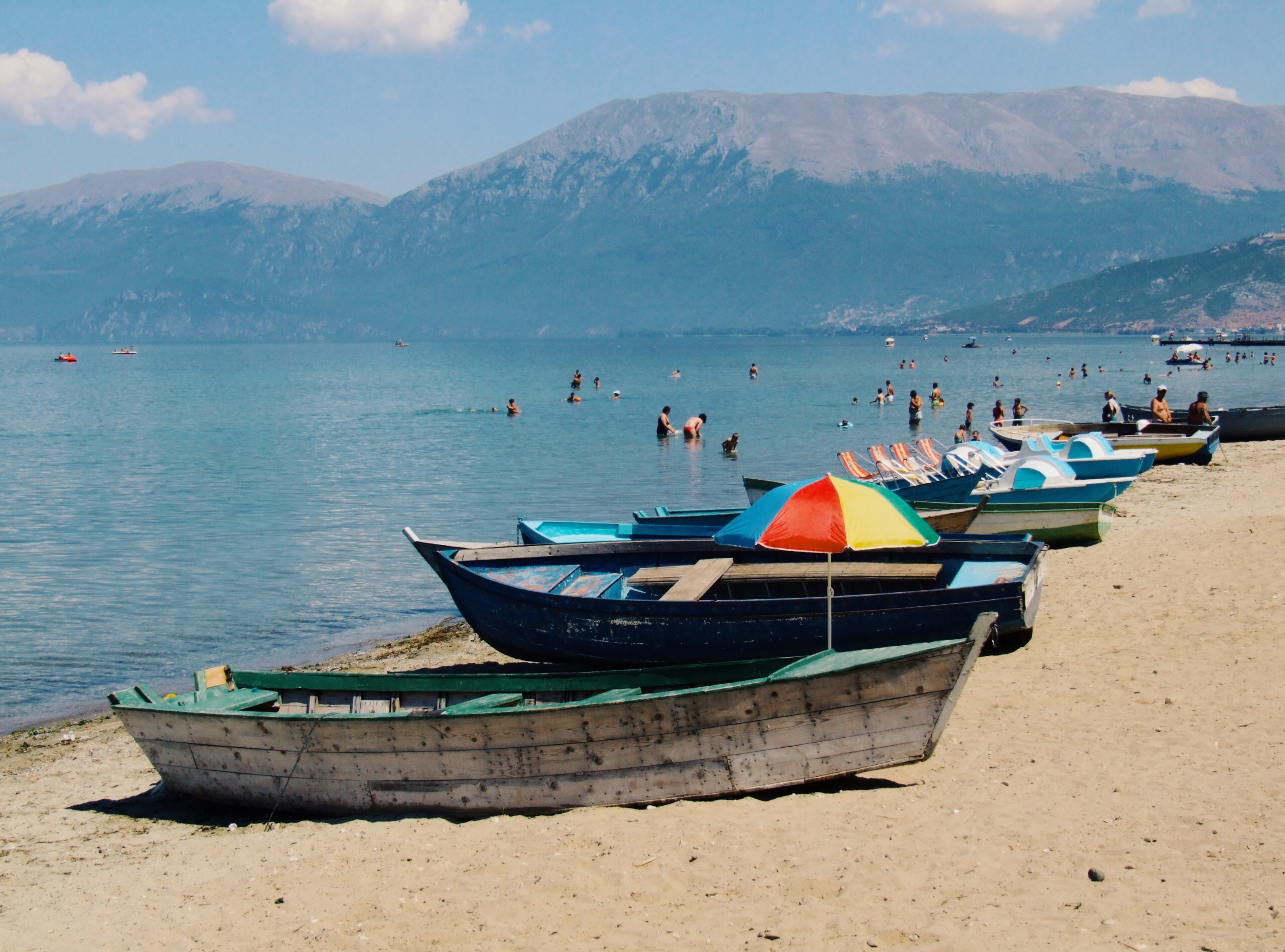
Beach in Pogradec

Pogradec is a resort town situated on the Albanian shore of Lake Ohrid, one of the oldest and most biologically diverse lakes in Europe. Its lakeside waterfront stretches for approximately 8 km (5.0 mi) and includes a promenade, beaches and public bathing areas with extensive views across the lake.

Immediately south of the town is Tushemisht, a village notable for its traditional architecture, canals and the nearby springs of Drilon. North of Pogradec lies Lin, a peninsula best known for a Neolithic pile-dwelling settlement and the remains of an Early Christian basilica distinguished by its well-preserved mosaic floors.

== See also ==
- List of beaches
- Albanian Riviera
- Important Bird Areas in Albania
