= Belaj =

Belaj may refer to:

Places

- Belaj, Albania, in Shkodër County
- Belaj, Cerovlje, Istria, Croatia
- Belaj, Mawal, Pune district, Maharashtra, India

People

- Amalija Belaj (born 1939), Slovenian cross-country skier
- Vitomir Belaj (born 1937) Slovenian-born Croatian ethnologist
