= Rrushkull =

Rrushkull may refer to:

- Rrushkull, Shkodër, a village in the municipality of Shkodër, Shkodër County, Albania
- Rrushkull, Lezhë, a village in the municipality of Mirditë, Lezhë County, Albania
