= Malsori Island =

Island in Albania

- Location within Albania
- Etymology: The Highlander Island

Geography
- Location: Buna river
- Coordinates: 42°00′10″N 19°27′32″E
- Total islands: 4
- Area: 0.4 km^{2} (0.15 sq mi)
- Area rank: 3rd
- Highest elevation: 5 m (16 ft)

Administration
- Albania
- County: Shkodër County
- Municipal unit: Dajç

Malsori Island (Albanian: Ishulli i Malsorit) is an island on the river Buna, situated in the north-west of Albania, near Lake Shkodër. Over time, the island has eroded into a small archipelago. Uninhabited by human population, it is part of the Dajç municipal unit, Shkodër County and has a surface area of 0.4 km^{2} (0.15 sq mi), which makes it the third-largest island in Albania in terms of size. The nearby settlement of Darragjat serves as a connection link for access to other populated areas of the interior.

In northern Albanian gheg dialect, the word Malsori means The Highlander, thus Malsori island translates as "The Highlander Island".
