= Floçka =

Albanian mythological creature

The Floçka also known as the "Gërzheta" is a nymph-like creature from Albanian paganism. They are described as inhabiting the lands near bodies of water such as lakes and islands in hidden parts of the mountains. The Floçka are said to have immense beauty.

== Name ==
The name Floçka comes from the Albanian word for hair "flokë", with the name deriving from their very long hair. The name "Gërzhetë" used in some regions of Albania, with it deriving from the Albania word "gërshet" used to describe a hair style with two ponytails. Albanian poet Gjergj Fishta also refers to them as "Të Bukurat e Detit" (The beauties of the sea).

== In mythology ==
=== Appearance and characteristics ===
The Floçka are described as beautiful women with very long hair. They do not speak the Albanian language as opposed to other mythological creatures from Albanian paganism, however it can be taught to them. According to Fishta, despite mostly residing in water, the Floçka's can also survive on land. They are usually depicted as bathing in hidden lakes or in seas. The Floçka's are also believed to serve as protectors of lakes and rivers.

=== Beliefs ===
According to Albanian historian Daniel Gjeçaj, the Floçka were firstly believed by the ancestors of the Kelmendi tribe of Shkodër. Toponyms indicating in nymph-like creatures being worshipped on the Adriatic coast of Albania, in the lands between Shëngjin and Velipojë, such as "Logu i Zanave", "Pylli i Zanave" (Nymph forest) and "Kodra e nuseve" (Hill of wives). According to Tonin Çobani, the belief in Floçka's and nymphs in this region could have been the reason behind the Roman name for Shengjin, "Nymphaeum".

=== Legend ===
The "Legend of the Gërzheta" is an Albanian folkloric tale revolving around the mistreatment of women and motherly love. In the legend, a shepherd who is the youngest out of the 4 sons in his family tries to find a wife, as he was the only brother that was not married. While hearding sheep in the mountain, he spots 3 Floçka's swimming in a lake. Upon returning home, the man makes a plan with his brothers to trap the Floçka's and the following day they dug three holes next to the lake and near each one they placed a gound, a comb and a mirror. One of the Floçka's left the lake and one by one began grabbing each item before falling into the hole and being captured by the brothers. She would marry the youngest brother and would also give birth to a son, however she would never speak. After five years of marriage, the husband, wanting to hear his wives voice held a knife at their sons throat threatening to kill him if she didnt speak. The Gërzheta spoke for the very first time, telling the man to not kill their son, before revealing that they had sworn a Besa to each other five years ago that she would not have to talk until several days after the point at which she had already spoken, and that the husband had forgotten. Nonetheless, she continued to speak throughout the rest of the day, however before night came she asked her husband where the objects used to lure her into his trap were. Upon learning their location, she took them and ran away due to the husband breaking his oath.

== Sources ==
- Çobani, Tonin (2017). Mitologji Shqiptare [Albanian mythology]. Tirana: Albas. ISBN 978-9928-02-982-9.
