= Beach of Durrës =

Popular beach in Albania

Coordinates: 41°18′21″N 19°29′12″E

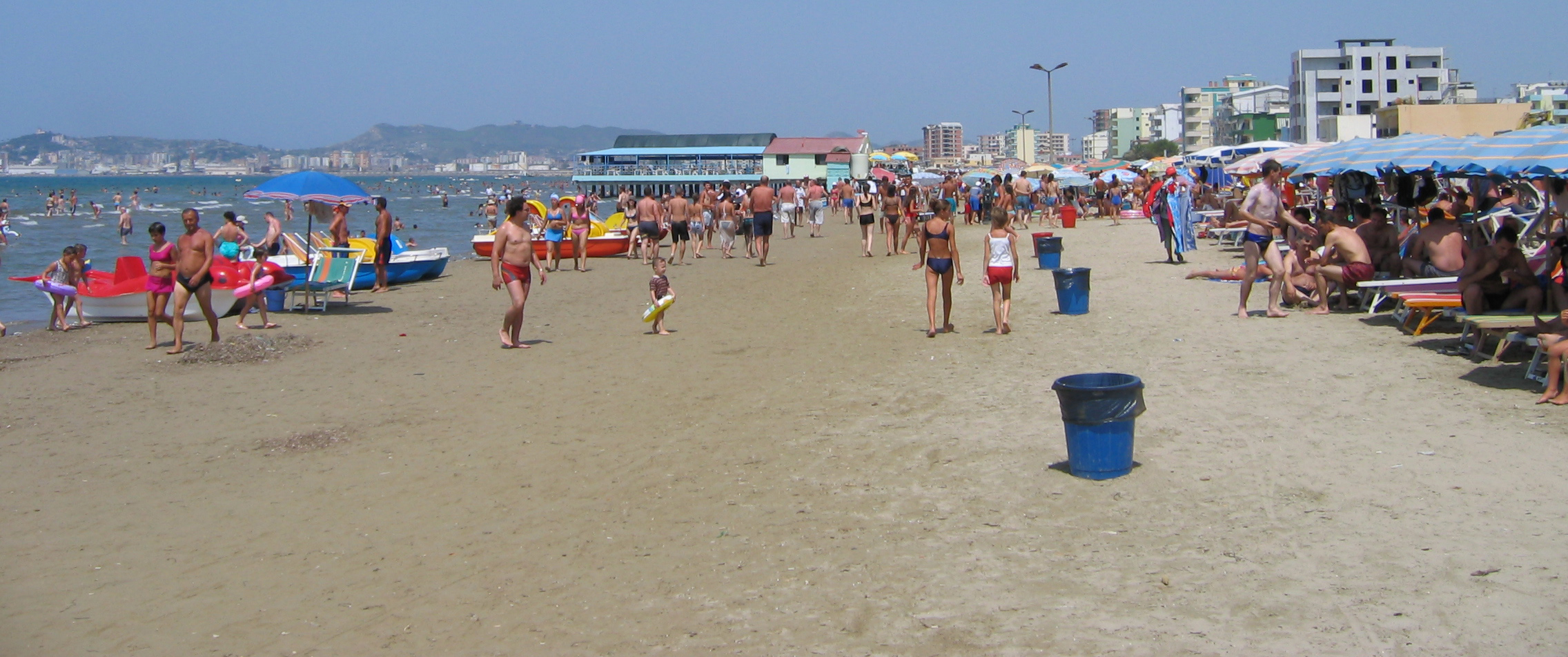
Beach of Durrës

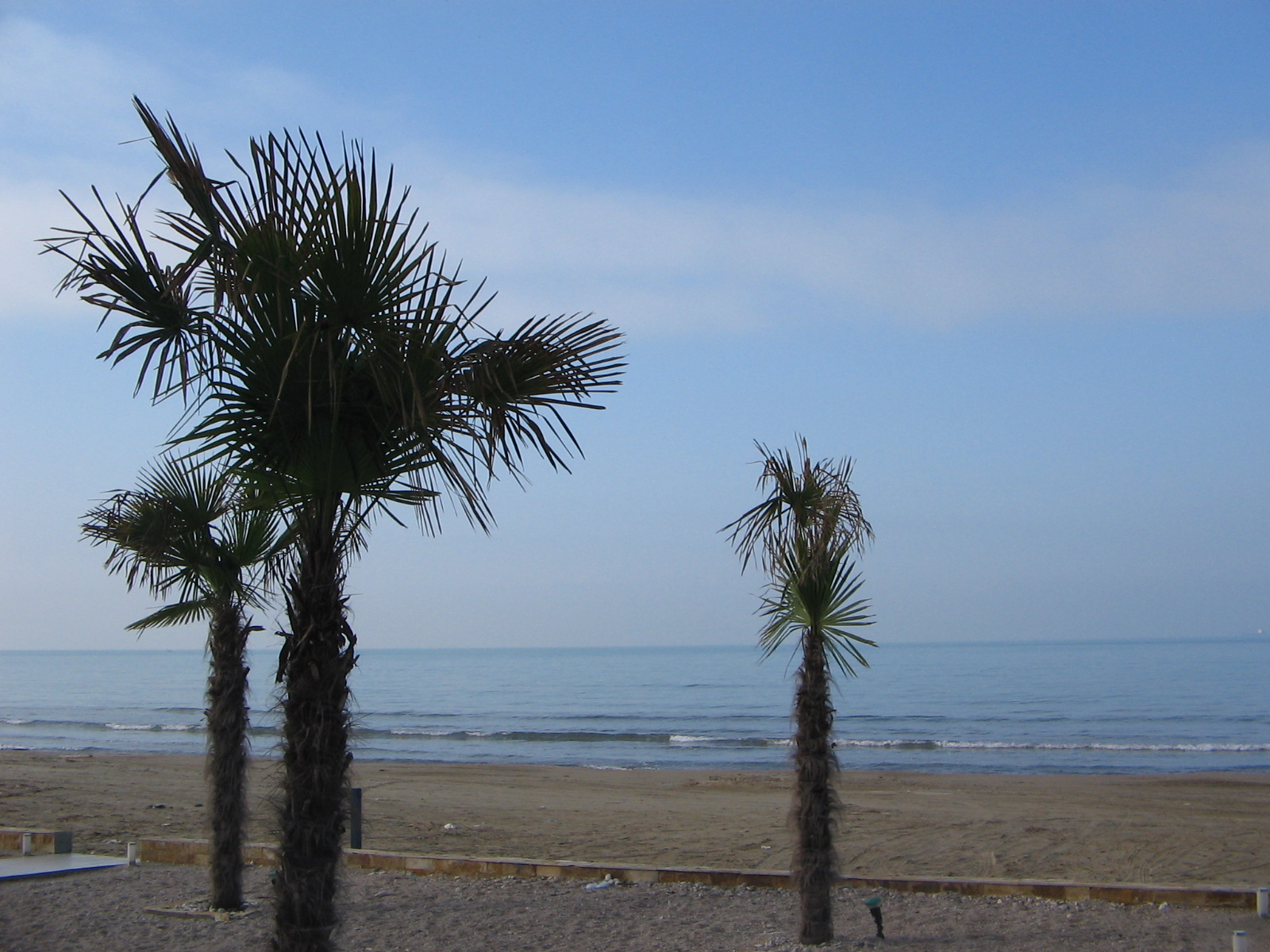
Looking out to sea

The Beach of Durrës (Albanian: Plazhi i Durrësit) is the biggest and most visited beach in Albania. It lines the seafront of the city of Durrës and is about 10.5 kilometres (6.5 mi) long. A number of notable Hotels overlook the beach such as the Adriatik Hotel.

This destination is popular with people from Albania (mainly from Middle and North Albania), Kosovo and North Macedonia. It is also a popular summer and weekend destination for the people of Tirana and Durrës. The estimated number of tourists, most of whom frequent the beach during the summer period, is about 600,000 a year.

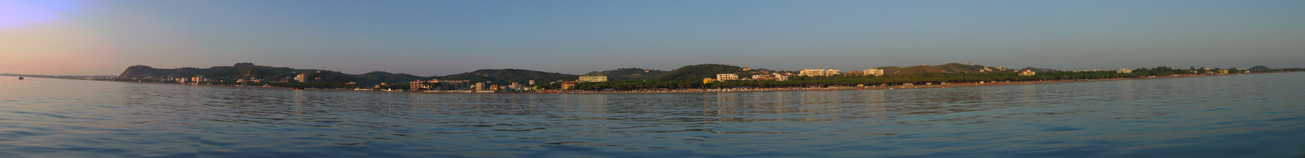
Panorama of Durrës beach

== See also ==
- Durrës
- List of beaches in Albania
