= Pjetër Gaci =

Albanian composer (1931–1995)

Pjetër Gaci AM AP
- Born: 27 March 1931; Shirq, Kingdom of Albania
- Died: 27 March 1995 (aged 64)
- Occupations: Musician; composer; conductor
- Musical career
- Genres: Folk; symphony
- Instruments: Mandolin, guitar, accordion, violin

Pjetër Gaci (Albanian pronunciation: [ˈpjɛtəɾ ˈgatsi]; 27 March 1931 – 27 March 1995) was an Albanian musician, composer and music teacher. He participated numerous times in Festivali i Këngës as composer and lyricist, winning 2 first prizes in 1966 and 1972.

== Life and career ==
Gaci was born in Shirq, a village near Shkodër, but grew up in Shirokë. His father was a known rhapsodist, so from a young age Gaci learned to play multiple instruments, among them guitar, violin, mandolin and accordion.

After finishing elementary school in Shkodër, he studied violin at the Jordan Misja Artistic Lyceum in Tirana from 1948 to 1952. He would continue higher studies in Russia, at Moscow Conservatory from 1953 to 1956. After returning to Albania he worked as a violin teacher at the Jordan Misja Artistic Lyceum in Tirana. In 1970 he became a full-time solo composer and in 1976 moved permanently from Tiranë to Shkodër. There, he again taught violin lessons at the Prenk Jakova Artistic Lyceum.

Gaci created the first violin concerto in Albanian history, the first ballad for violin and piano, and was a member of the first instrumental trio at the National Theatre of Opera and Ballet of Albania in 1956. However his most important work was in vocal music, where he left an unforgettable repertoire, ranging from songs to opera.

He was awarded the title of Merited Artist of Albania in 1989.
