= Mushan =

Mushan may refer to:

- Mushan, Albania
- Mushan, Zhejiang (牟山镇), town in Yuyao, Zhejiang, China
- Mushan, Iran
- Mushan, Afghanistan
