= Osum Island =

Island in south-central Albania

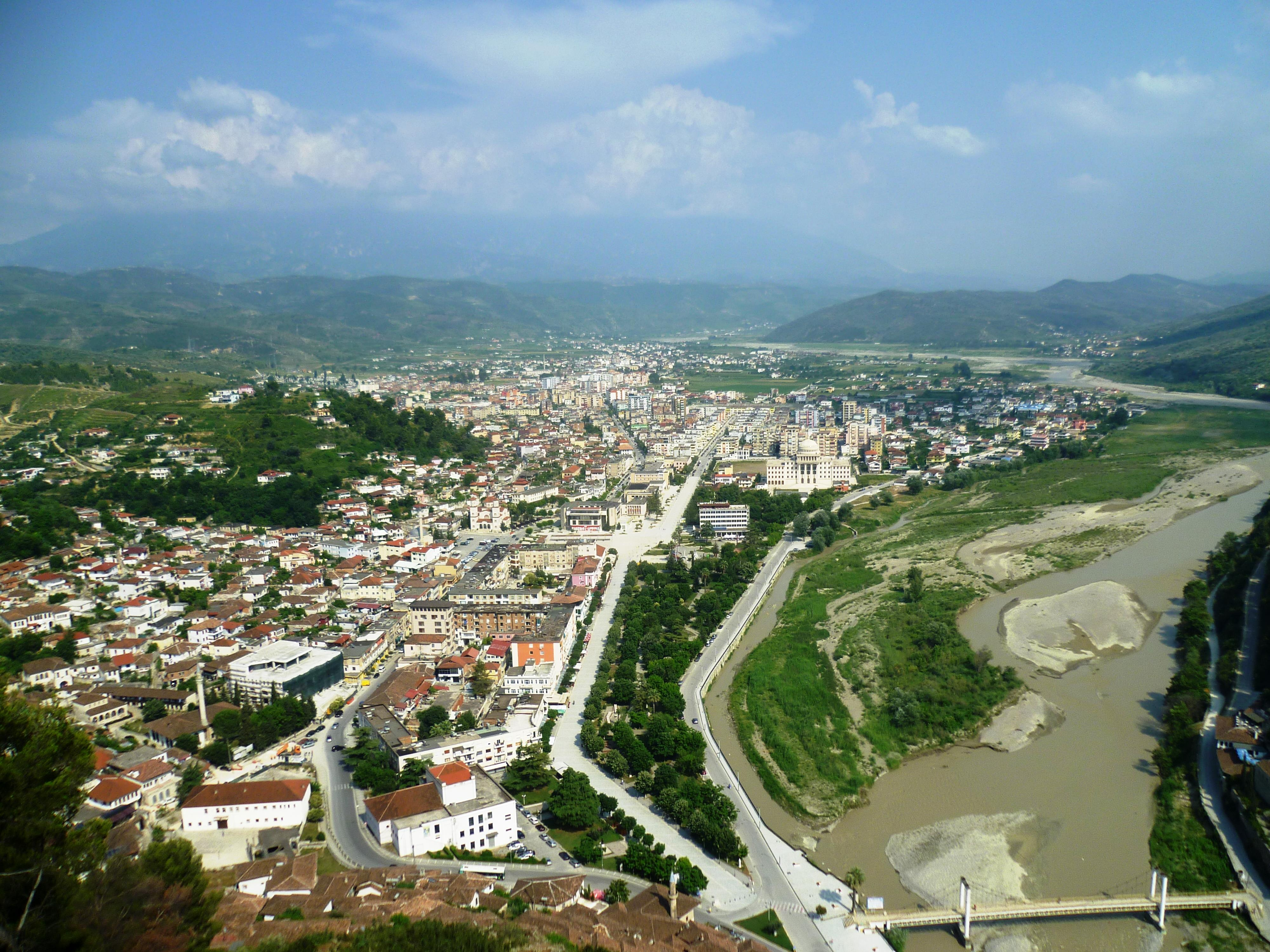
- Aerial view of the island to the right

- Location within Albania

Geography
- Location: Osum river
- Coordinates: 40°41′57″N 19°57′02″E
- Area: 0.03 km^{2} (0.012 sq mi)
- Area rank: 8th
- Highest elevation: 60 m (200 ft)

Administration
- Albania
- County: Berat County
- Municipality: Berat

Osum Island (Albanian: Ishulli i Osumit) is an island in south-central of Albania, in the Osum river, in the city of Berat.

== Geography ==
Osum island is located in the Osum river, in the Berat Municipality, Berat District, and it has an area of 3 hectares or 0.03 square km. The island is located in the center of the city of Berat.

== Development ==
In February 2015, the design firm Atelier Albania announced a competition in partnership with the municipality of Berat for designs on the development of Berat Island. Supported by the Albanian Fund for Development, the competition sought out designs that created an interplay between the built and natural environments, as well as adapted flexibly to natural phenomena, such as flooding.

== See also ==
- Tourism in Albania
- Albanian Riviera
- Geography of Albania
