= Takave Budruk =

Village in Maharashtra

Takave Budruk Takawe Budruk
- Village
- Country: India
- State: Maharashtra
- District: Pune
- Tehsil: Mawal

Government
  - Type: Panchayati Raj
  - Body: Gram panchayat

Area
  - Total: 1,127.97 ha (2,787.3 acres)

Population (2011)
  - Total: 4,143
  - Density: 367.3/km^{2} (951.3/sq mi)
- Sex ratio 2188 / 1955 ♂/♀

Languages
  - Official: Marathi
  - Other spoken: Hindi
- Time zone: UTC+5:30 (IST)
- Telephone code: 02114
- ISO 3166 code: IN-MH
- Vehicle registration: MH-14
- Website: pune.nic.in

Takave Budruk is a village and gram panchayat in Mawal taluka of Pune district in the state of Maharashtra, India. It encompasses an area of 1,127.97 ha (2,787 acres).

== Administration ==
The village is administrated by a sarpanch, an elected representative who leads a gram panchayat. At the time of the 2011 Census of India, the village was the headquarters for the eponymous gram panchayat, which also governed the villages of Belaj and Phalane.

== Demographics ==
At the 2011 census, the village comprised 829 households. The population of 4143 was split between 2188 males and 1955 females.

== See also ==
- List of villages in Mawal taluka
