= Darragjat =

- Village
- Location within Albania
- Coordinates: 42°0′N 19°27′E
- Country: Albania
- County: Shkodër
- Municipality: Shkodër
- Administrative unit: Dajç
- Time zone: UTC+1 (CET)
  - Summer (DST): UTC+2 (CEST)

Darragjat is a settlement in the former Dajç municipality, Shkodër County, northern Albania. At the 2015 local government reform it became part of the municipality Shkodër. Around the village crosses the river Buna, and near the village is the Malsori Island.
