= List of islands of Albania =

This is a list of islands in Albania ranked by surface area.

== List of islands ==
Part of a national park
Part of a nature park

No.	Name	Image	Description	Location
1	Sazan		Sazan is the largest island in Albania, strategically located between the Strait of Otranto and the mouth of the Bay of Vlorë, just off the northern tip of the Karaburun Peninsula, forming the boundary line between the Adriatic and Ionian seas. It has a length of 4.8 km (3.0 mi), a width of 2.7 km (1.7 mi) and a total surface area of 5.7 km^{2} (2.2 sq mi). Due to its climatic, hydrological and geological conditions, the island is characterized for its unique vegetation and biodiversity.	List of islands of Albania is located in Albania
2	Kunë		Merxhan, better known as Kunë Island, borrowing from the name of the lagoon where it resides, lies on the Drin river delta, near Lezhë, on Albania's northern adriatic coast. It has a surface area of 1.4 square kilometres (0.5 sq mi) and features unique and varied biodiversity, including plants such as small Mediterranean shrubs to ash and willow forests. Fauna is abundant as well; with around 70 species of birds, 22 species of reptiles, 6 species of amphibians and 23 species of mammals.	List of islands of Albania is located in Albania
3	Malsori		A 40 hectares (99 acres) island on the Buna river, near the city of Shkodër, northern Albania. In Albanian, its name Malësor can be translated "Highlander", so Malësori Island means Highlander Island. Several villages are situated around the island; the nearest of is Darragjat, and is less than 5 kilometres (3.1 mi) from Shkodër Lake, one of the largest lake in Southern Europe.	List of islands of Albania is located in Albania
4	Zvërnec		The Islands of Zvërnec consist of two islands with a total surface of 10 hectares (25 acres), the larger Zvërnec Island 8.7 hectares (21 acres) and small Zvërnec Island with 1.3 hectares (3.2 acres). They are located in the Narta Lagoon, southern Albania. The wooded island is characterized by pine trees and is connected to the mainland by a 207 metres (679 ft) long bridge. It has a length of 430 m (0.27 mi) and a width of 300 m (0.19 mi). Zvërnec is also a main tourist attraction in southern Albania, with it well preserved 13th century Byzantine, Zvërnec Monastery.	List of islands of Albania is located in Albania
5	Shurdhah		Shurdhah or as referred by its medieval name Sarda, is located in the Vau i Dejës Reservoir drained by the Drin river in northern Albania, having a surface of 7.5 hectares (19 acres). Ruins of an ancient Roman castle can be found within the island. Today, only the ruins of a medieval church are existing.	List of islands of Albania is located in Albania
6	Islets of Ksamil		The four islets of Tetranis, more commonly known by their administrative name as Ksamil Islets, are located in southern Albania, along the Albanian Riviera having a surface area of 9 hectares (22 acres). The islands are remote and can only be accessed by boat. The village of Ksamil, after whom the islands are named, is located to the east of the islands.	List of islands of Albania is located in Albania
7	Maligrad		The Island of Maligrad is situated within the Lake Prespa, forming a part of the Prespa National Park in eastern Albania. It has a surface area of 5 hectares (12 acres). The island host many caves suitable for wildlife and a circular cliff.	List of islands of Albania is located in Albania
8	Osum		Osum island is located in the Osum river, in the Berat Municipality, Berat District, and it has an area of 3 hectares or 0.03 square km. The island is located in the center of the city of Berat.	List of islands of Albania is located in Albania
9	Tongo		The small island is located within the Albanian Ionian coast in southern Albania. It is a rocky island, and its waters are rich in aquatic life. The island is situated about 300 metres (984 feet) off the Greek coast. It has a surface area of 2.5 hectares (6.2 acres).	List of islands of Albania is located in Albania
10	Stillo		Stillo is a small, rocky and sparsely island located near the Cape of Stillo, Vlorë, southern Albania. During the communist regime, the island was used as a military zone 1992 and access was prohibited. Although not the most southern point of Albania, it consists of the southernmost tip of the entire coastline of Albania. Its total area is 0.7 hectares (1.7 acres), with an approximate length of 80 m (0.050 mi) and a width of 100 m (0.062 mi).	List of islands of Albania is located in Albania
11	Paqe		The Islet of Paqe is located within the Koman Lake in northern Albania, near the Albanian Alps and Fierzë. It is found in one of the lake's river canyons. Paqe Island is only 160 m (0.099 mi) long, having a surface of 0.3 hectares (0.74 acres). The islet is small with many trees on top of it. There are many islands within the Fierza Lake as well as in Koman Lake, that are much larger and more stony textured than Paqe Islands sandy ground.	List of islands of Albania is located in Albania
12	Pelican Island		Pelican Island is a small island located within the confines of the Karavasta Lagoon. At an elevation of 0.5 m above sea level, the island has formed from the accumulation of organic waste, which has created an ecosystem rich in herbaceous plants. Here, the curly pelican, native to the region, has established its nesting grounds.	List of islands of Albania is located in Albania

== See also ==
- Franc Jozeph Island
- Protected areas of Albania
- Geography of Albania
- Biodiversity of Albania
- Climate of Albania
