= Buna River-Velipojë Protected Landscape =

Protected area and a tourist attraction in Albania

- IUCN category V (protected landscape/seascape)
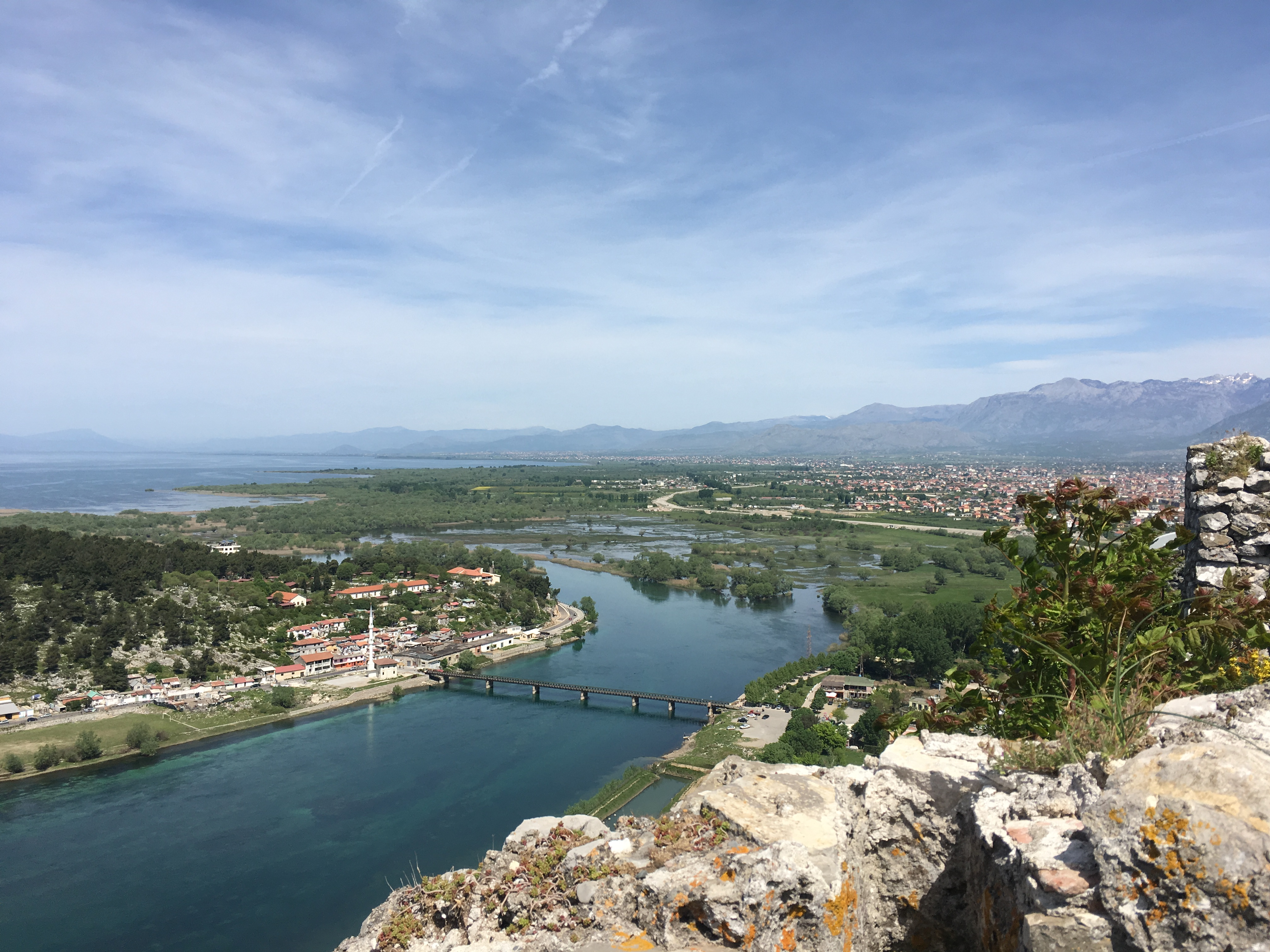
- Buna River in Shkodër

- Location within Albania Location within Europe
- Location: Shkodër County
- Nearest city: Shkodër
- Coordinates: 41°56′6″N 19°27′1″E
- Area: 23,027 hectares (230.27 km^{2})
- Established: 2 November 2005
- Governing body: National Agency of Protected Areas
- Website: www.livingbuna.org

The Buna River-Velipojë Protected Landscape (Albanian: Peisazh i Mbrojtur Lumi Buna-Velipojë) is a protected landscape area in northwestern Albania, encompassing the estuary of Drin, the lagoon of Viluni, the river of Buna with its estuary, and the gulf of Drin that runs across the city of Velipojë alongside the Adriatic Sea.

The International Union for Conservation of Nature (IUCN) has noted the park as Category V and has been further recognized as a wetland of international importance by designation under the Ramsar Convention. Being part of the European Green Belt, the landscape is, in addition, an Important Bird and Plant Area, because it supports extraordinary threatened and endemic bird and plant species.

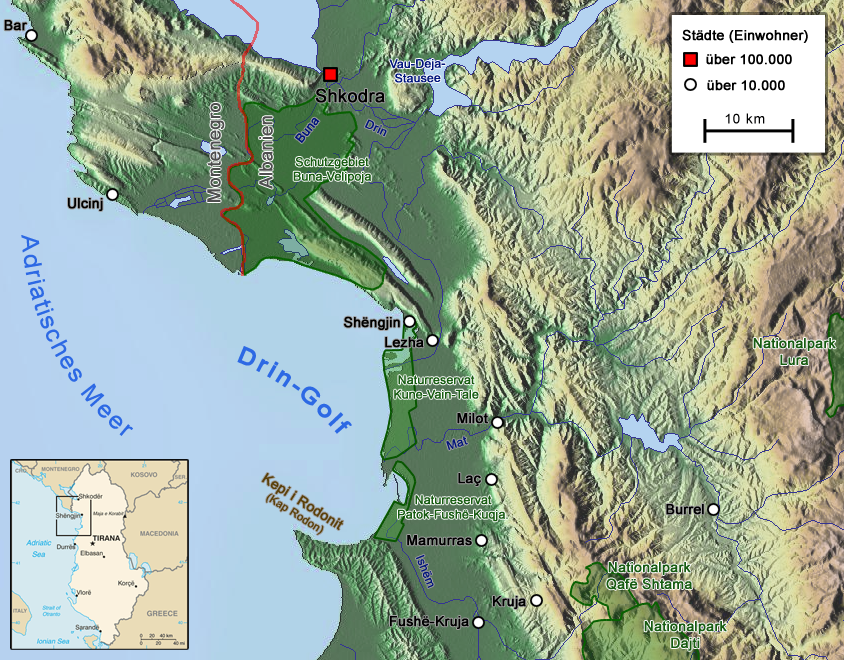
Coastal protected areas near Velipoja and Shengjin

Stretching between the Dinaric Alps and the Mediterranean Sea, the river of Buna is an outflow of the lake of Shkodër, the largest lake in Southern and Southeastern Europe, which ultimately runs through the river until it drains into the Adriatic Sea. The landscape is an essential migration corridor at that season for hundreds of species between the Adriatic Sea and the innland.

The region is explicitly marked by a relatively flat and shallow landscape supplied with alluvial forests, dry grasslands, marsh and shrublands, estuaries, freshwater wetlands and beaches. The climate of the landscape is strongly under the influence of the Adriatic Sea in the west and the Albanian Alps in the north. Under the Köppen climate classification, it experiences a mediterranean climate characterized by warm to dry-hot summers and mild-wet to rainy winters.

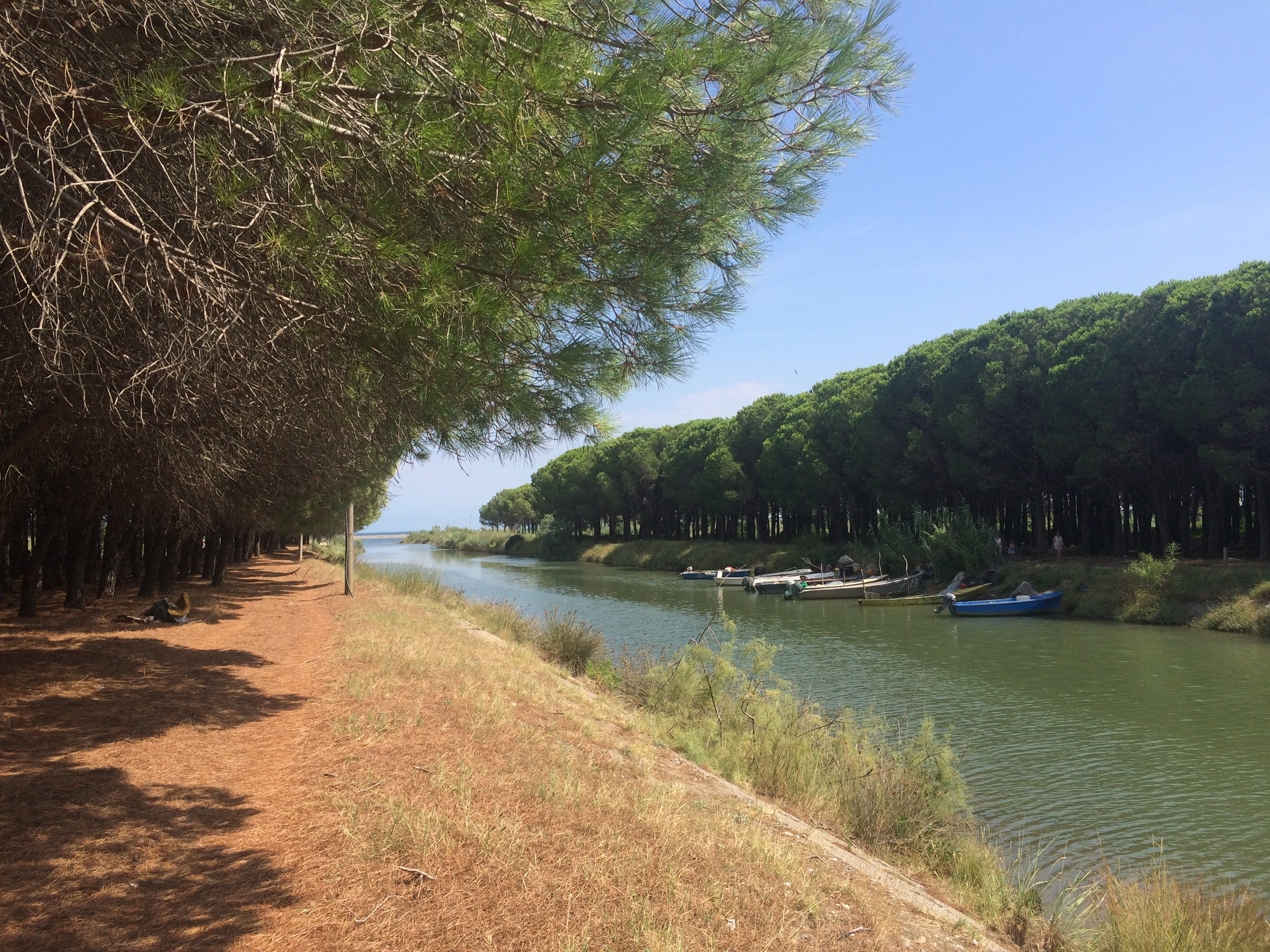
Viluni Lagoon

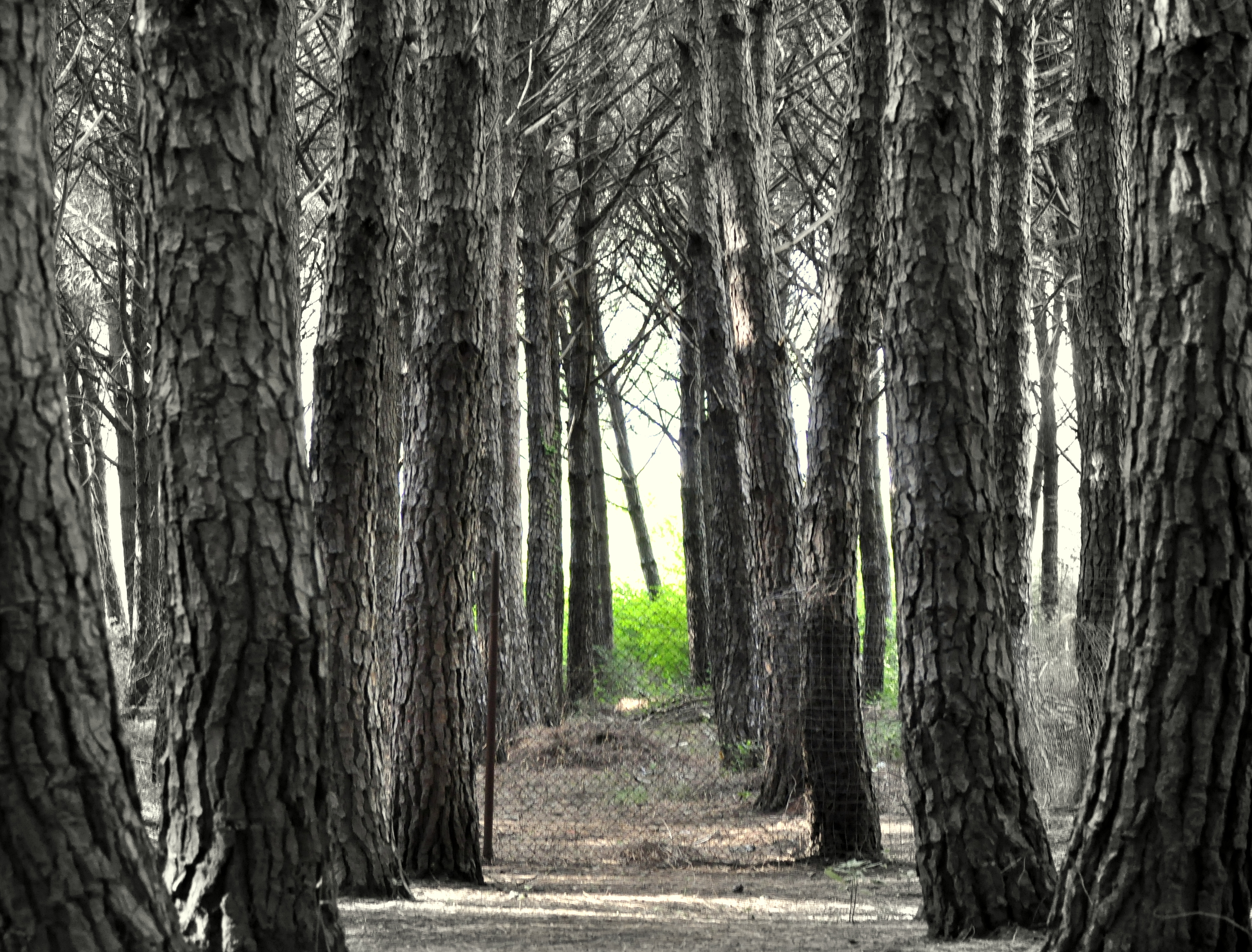
Forest inside the protected area

A wide variety of wildlife species live in the region. The golden jackal occurs in the woodlands and marshes of the riverine floodplains. The coastline, dotted with sand dunes, offers great feeding opportunities for the brown bear. The common bottlenose dolphin has been identified within its waters and prefers the coastal waters and river deltas. Two species are outstanding, though, the green sea and loggerhead sea turtle which nest in the beaches of the gulf. The dalmatian pelican uses the salt pans around the region as feeding habitats during autumn.

== See also ==
- Geography of Albania
- Protected areas of Albania
- Albanian Adriatic Sea Coast
- Mediterranean wetlands
