= Pelican Island (Albania) =

Island in Albania

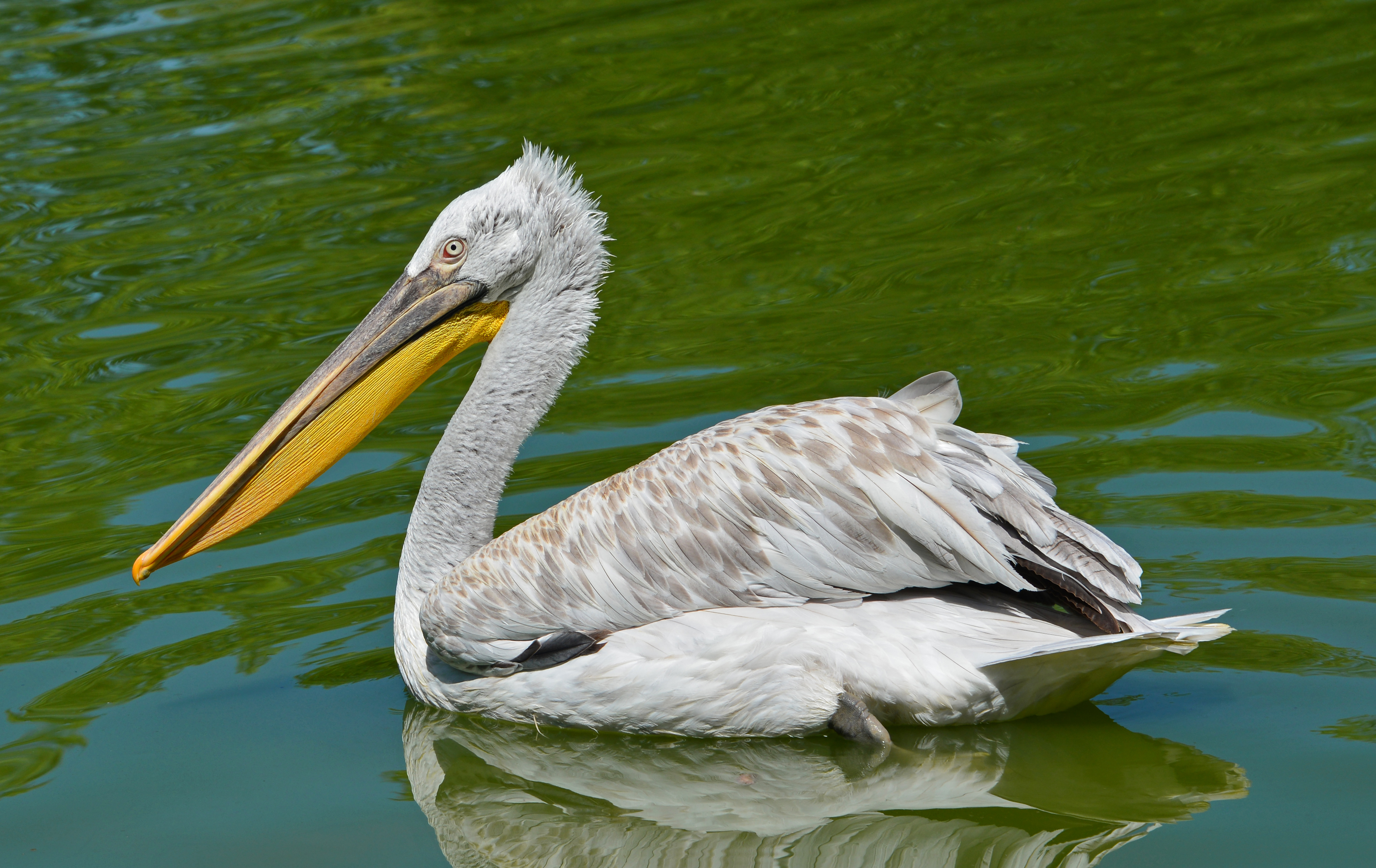
- Curly pelican swimming

- Location within Albania

Geography
- Location: Karavasta Lagoon
- Coordinates: 40°56′11″N 19°31′04″E
- Area rank: 12th
- Highest elevation: 0.5 m (1.6 ft)

Administration
- Albania
- County: Fier County
- Municipality: Divjakë

Pelican Island (Albanian: Ishulli i Pelikanit) is a small island located within the confines of the Karavasta Lagoon, in the municipality of Divjakë, western Albania.

== Geography ==
At an elevation of 0.5 m above sea level, the island has formed from the accumulation of organic waste, which has created an ecosystem rich in herbaceous plants. Here, the curly pelican, native to the region, has established its nesting grounds with a breeding period that ranges between January and June. The large white bird with grey markings, weighs about 16 kg and feeds on fish and other lagoon creatures.

In 2020, a surveillance system was set up on the island to observe and monitor the daily activity of the pelicans.
