= Paqe Islet =

Island in Albania

- Location within Albania
- Etymology: Isle of Peace

Geography
- Location: Lake Koman
- Coordinates: 42°09′34″N 19°52′49″E
- Area: 0.18 ha (0.44 acres)
- Area rank: 11th
- Length: 160 m (520 ft)

Administration
- Albania
- County: Shkodër County
- Municipality: Fushë-Arrëz

Paqe Islet (Albanian: Ishulli i Paqes) is a small islet located on the waterways of Lake Koman, northern Albania.

== Geography ==
The artificial basin of Lake Koman winds like a fjord between mountains and steep hills. At a certain point, along the way, you come across a rocky islet covered in vegetation, where a large white cross stands out. Situated across the territorial boundary of Fushë-Arrëz, Ishulli i Paqes (English: Isle of Peace) is one of the main tourist attractions of the lake. The islet is 160 meters long and has a surface area of 0.18 ha (0.44 acres). According to local folklore, this was a place where blood feud disputes between rival families were said to have been settled.

On May 19, 2007, the islet was baptized with its current namesake at the request of His Excellency, Monsignor Lucjan Avgustini, during the 10th anniversary celebration of the placement of the statue of "Our Lady of Lourdes" (Albanian: Zoja e Lurdit) inside the Cave of Kauri.
