= Tongo Island =

Island in Albania

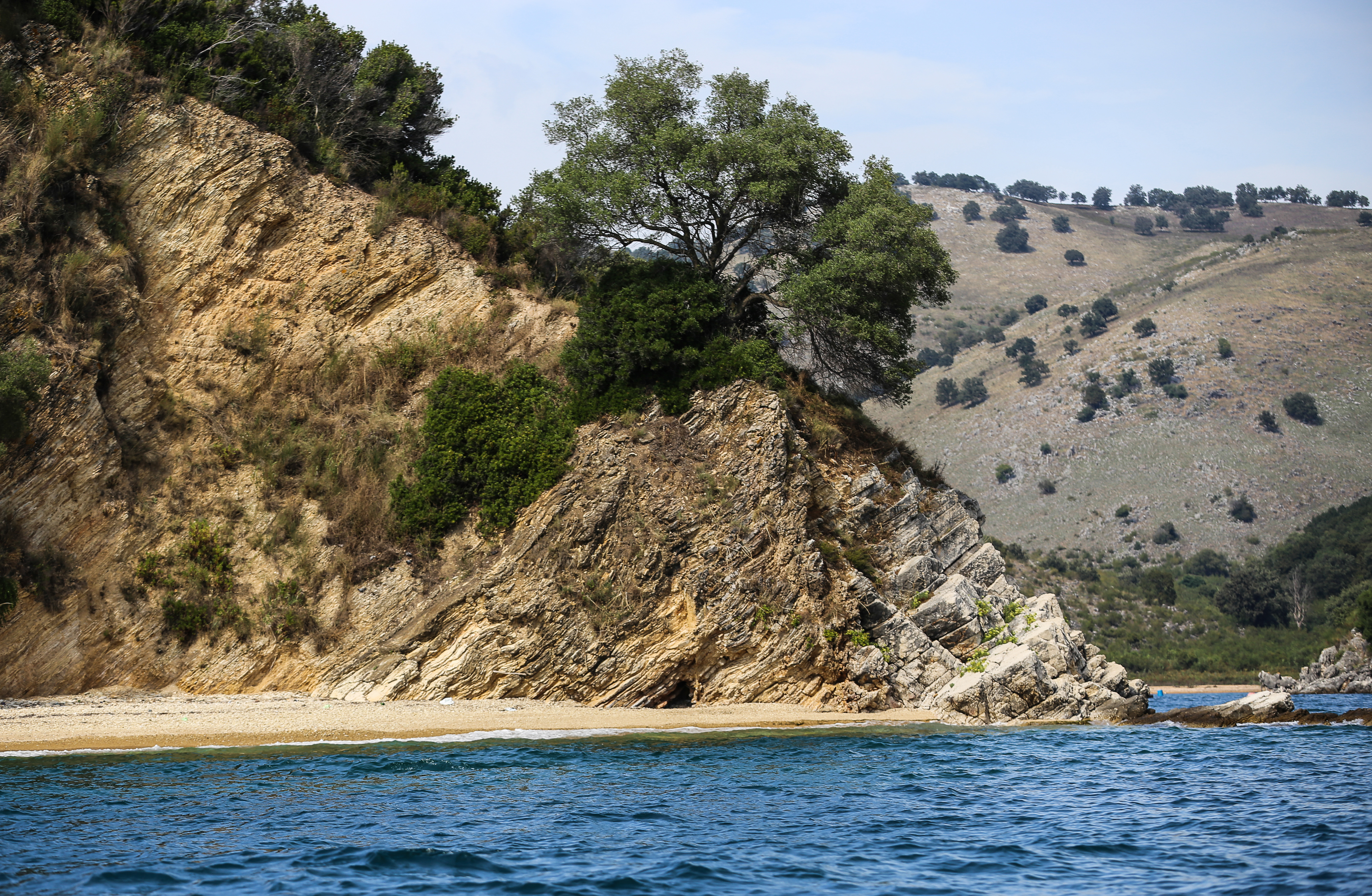
- Island shore with the mainland in the background

- Location within Albania

Geography
- Location: Ionian Sea
- Coordinates: 39°41′25″N 20°00′20″E
- Area rank: 9th
- Length: 250 m (820 ft)
- Width: 100 m (300 ft)
- Highest elevation: 10 m (30 ft)

Administration
- Albania
- County: Vlorë County
- Municipality: Konispol

Tongo Island (Albanian: Ishulli i Tongos) is an island on the Ionian Sea, in southern Albania, near the border with Greece.

== Geography ==
Tongo is a small rocky island located at the entrance to the bay of Ftelia, on the southernmost end of the Albanian Ionian coast. Situated at a distance of 300 m (980 ft) from the coast, it has a length of 250 m (820 ft), a width of 100 m (330 ft) and a total surface area of 2.5 ha (6.2 acres).

In the south-east of the island, about 50 m (160 ft) away from its shore, the state border of Albania with Greece passes. The island is rich in aquatic life and can easily be explored by boat.

== See also ==
- Tourism in Albania
- Albanian Riviera
- Geography of Albania
