= Viluni Lagoon =

Lake in Albania

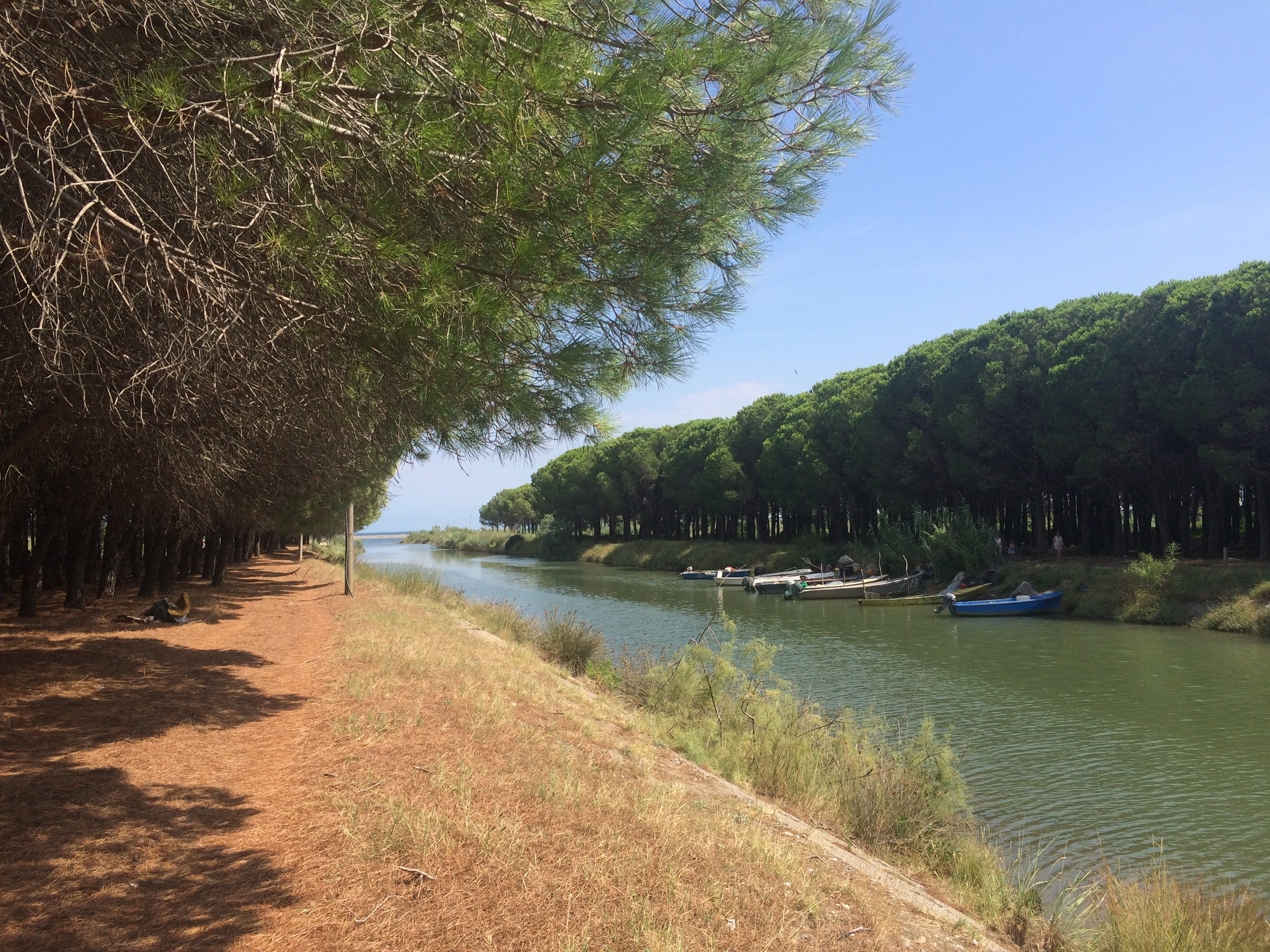
Lagoon of Viluni

Viluni Lagoon (Albanian: Laguna e Vilunit or Këneta e Vilunit), also commonly Lagoon of Velipojë, is a lagoon of the Adriatic Sea on the Mediterranean Sea in the northern coast of Albania. Throughout history, the lagoon was a sea inlet and has been currently transformed into an estuary formed through a channel from the Buna River.

The lagoon is situated within the boundaries of the Buna River-Velipoja Protected Landscape and has been recognised as an Important Bird Area wetland of international importance by designation under the BirdLife International Convention.

== See also ==
- Protected areas of Albania
- Albanian Adriatic Sea Coast
- List of Important Bird Areas in Albania
