= Kakome Bay =

Bay in Albania

- Gjiri i Kakomesë
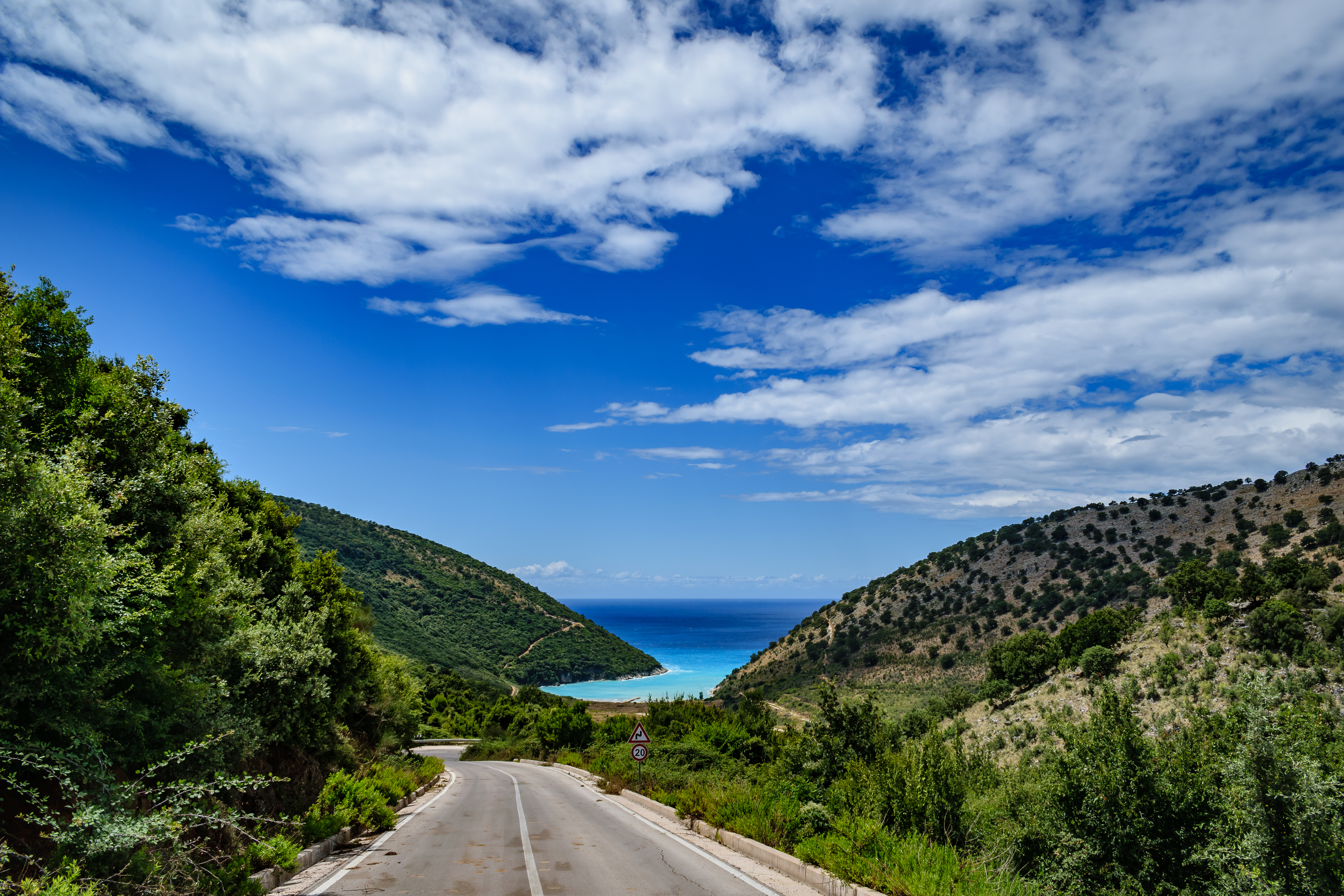
- View of Kakome Bay

- Location in Albania
- Location: Ionian Sea, Albania
- Coordinates: 39°55′34.8″N 19°56′17.7″E
- Type: Bay
- Part of: Ionian Sea
- Basin countries: Albania
- Settlements: Near Nivicë, Himarë

Kakome Bay (Albanian: Gjiri i Kakomesë — Albanian pronunciation: [ˈɟiːɾi i kakɔˈmɛsə]) is a small bay located along the Ionian Sea coast in southern Albania. It lies west of the village of Nivicë, within the municipality of Himarë, nestled between the capes of Kapo Qefali and Krorëz.

== Geological formation ==
The bay was formed through tectonic activity and karstic erosion. A small seasonal stream, also named Kakomë, flows into the bay. The inlet extends inland several hundred meters, with a width of approximately 300 to 400 meters. A pebble beach is found nearby, and the southern slopes surrounding the bay are covered with relatively well-preserved native vegetation.

The northern side, by contrast, is more barren and rocky, dominated by sparse shrubs. This side also features steep cliffs, which are largely impassable, leading to the nearby Krorëz Beach, where the historic Monastery of Saint Mary is located. Two additional monasteries can be found further inland, east of the bay.
