= Dajç, Shkodër =

Dajç
- Administrative unit
- Location within Albania
- Coordinates: 42°0′N 19°25′E
- Country: Albania
- County: Shkodër
- Municipality: Shkodër
  - Administrative unit: 30.15 km^{2} (11.64 sq mi)

Population (2011)
  - Administrative unit: 3,885
  - Administrative unit density: 128.9/km^{2} (333.7/sq mi)
- Time zone: UTC+1 (CET)
  - Summer (DST): UTC+2 (CEST)

Dajç (Albanian definite form: Dajçi) is a village and a former municipality in the Shkodër County, northwestern Albania. At the 2015 local government reform it became a subdivision of the municipality Shkodër. The population at the 2011 census was 3,885.

== Settlements ==
There are 11 settlements within Dajç.

1. Dajç
2. Darragjat
3. Belaj
4. Mali i Gjymtit
5. Mushan
6. Pentar
7. Rrushkull
8. Samrisht i Ri
9. Samrisht i Sipërm
10. Sukë Dajç
11. Shirq
