= Shirq =

- Village
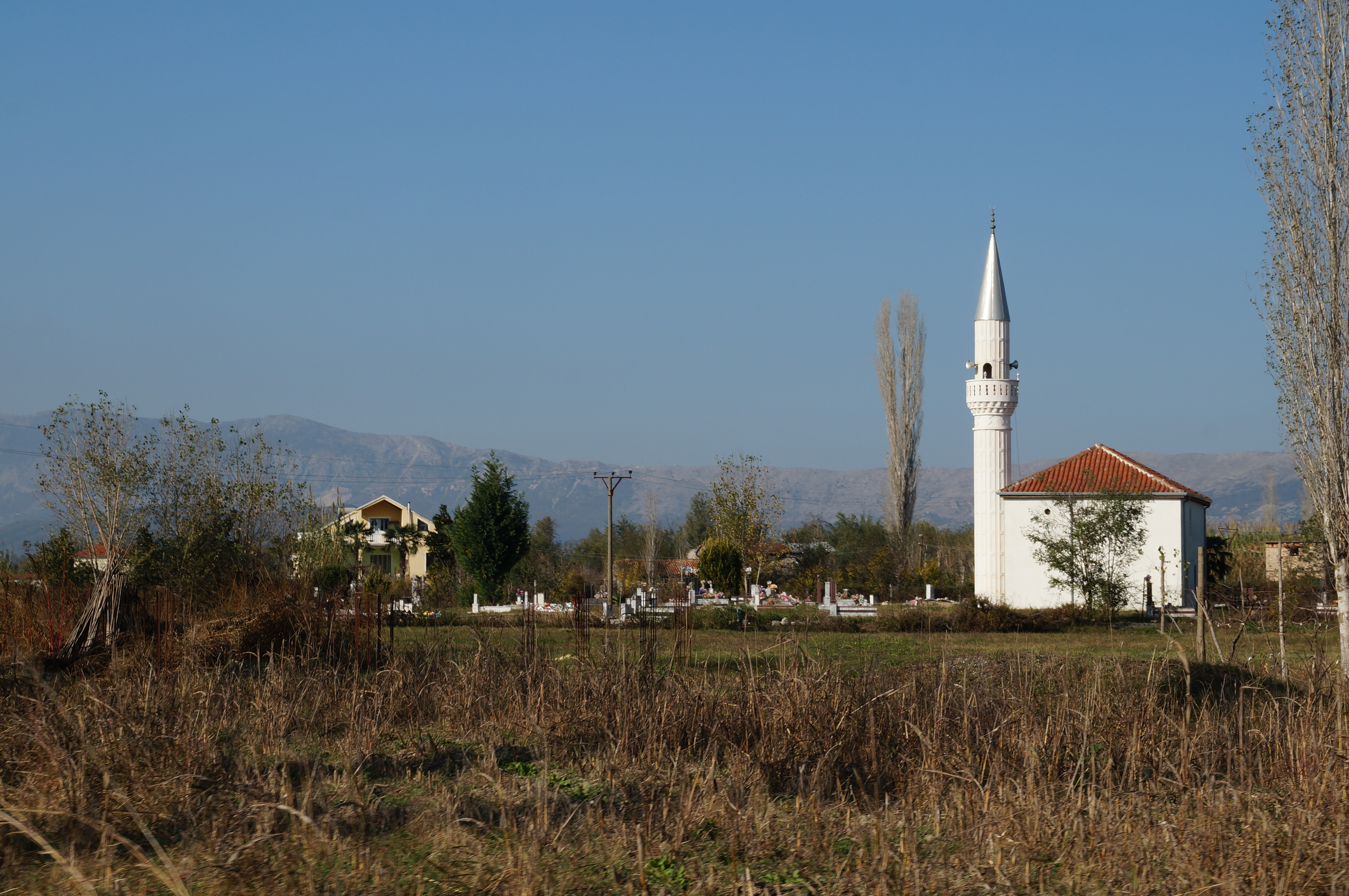

- Location within Albania
- Coordinates: 41°59′3″N 19°26′36″E
- Country: Albania
- County: Shkodër
- Municipality: Shkodër
- Administrative unit: Dajç
- Time zone: UTC+1 (CET)
  - Summer (DST): UTC+2 (CEST)

Shirgj (sometimes Shirq) is a settlement in the former Dajç municipality, Shkodër County, northern Albania. At the 2015 local government reform it became part of the municipality Shkodër.

At the banks of the river Buna a little bit outside the village lie the ruins of the Shirgj Church from the late 13th century.
