= Belaj, Albania =

Belaj
- Village
- Location within Albania
- Coordinates: 41°58′35″N 19°24′2″E
- Country: Albania
- County: Shkodër
- Municipality: Shkodër
- Administrative unit: Dajç
- Time zone: UTC+1 (CET)
  - Summer (DST): UTC+2 (CEST)

Belaj is a settlement in the former Dajç municipality, Shkodër County, northern Albania. At the 2015 local government reform it became part of the municipality Shkodër.
