= Belaj, Mawal =

Village in Maharashtra

Belaj
- Village
- Location in Maharashtra, India Belaj (India)
- Coordinates: 18.7814289°N 73.6161553°E
- Country: India
- State: Maharashtra
- District: Pune
- Tehsil: Mawal

Government
  - Type: Panchayati Raj
  - Body: Gram panchayat

Area
  - Total: 541.39 ha (1,337.8 acres)

Population (2011)
  - Total: 993
  - Density: 183/km^{2} (475/sq mi)
- Sex ratio 484/509 ♂/♀

Languages
  - Official: Marathi
  - Other spoken: Hindi
- Time zone: UTC+5:30 (IST)
- Pin code: 410405
- Telephone code: 02114
- ISO 3166 code: IN-MH
- Vehicle registration: MH-14
- Website: pune.nic.in

Belaj is a village in Mawal taluka of Pune district in the state of Maharashtra, India. It encompasses an area of 541.39 ha (1,338 acres).

== Administration ==
The village is administrated by a sarpanch, an elected representative who leads a gram panchayat for a mandate of 5 years. At the time of the 2011 Census of India, the gram panchayat governed three villages and was based at Takave Budruk.

== Demographics ==
At the 2011 census, the village comprised 79 households. The population of 470 and was split between 229 males and 241 females.Children between 0–6 years amounted to 12.55% of the total population.

== See also ==
- List of villages in Mawal taluka
