= Stillo Islet =

Island in Albania

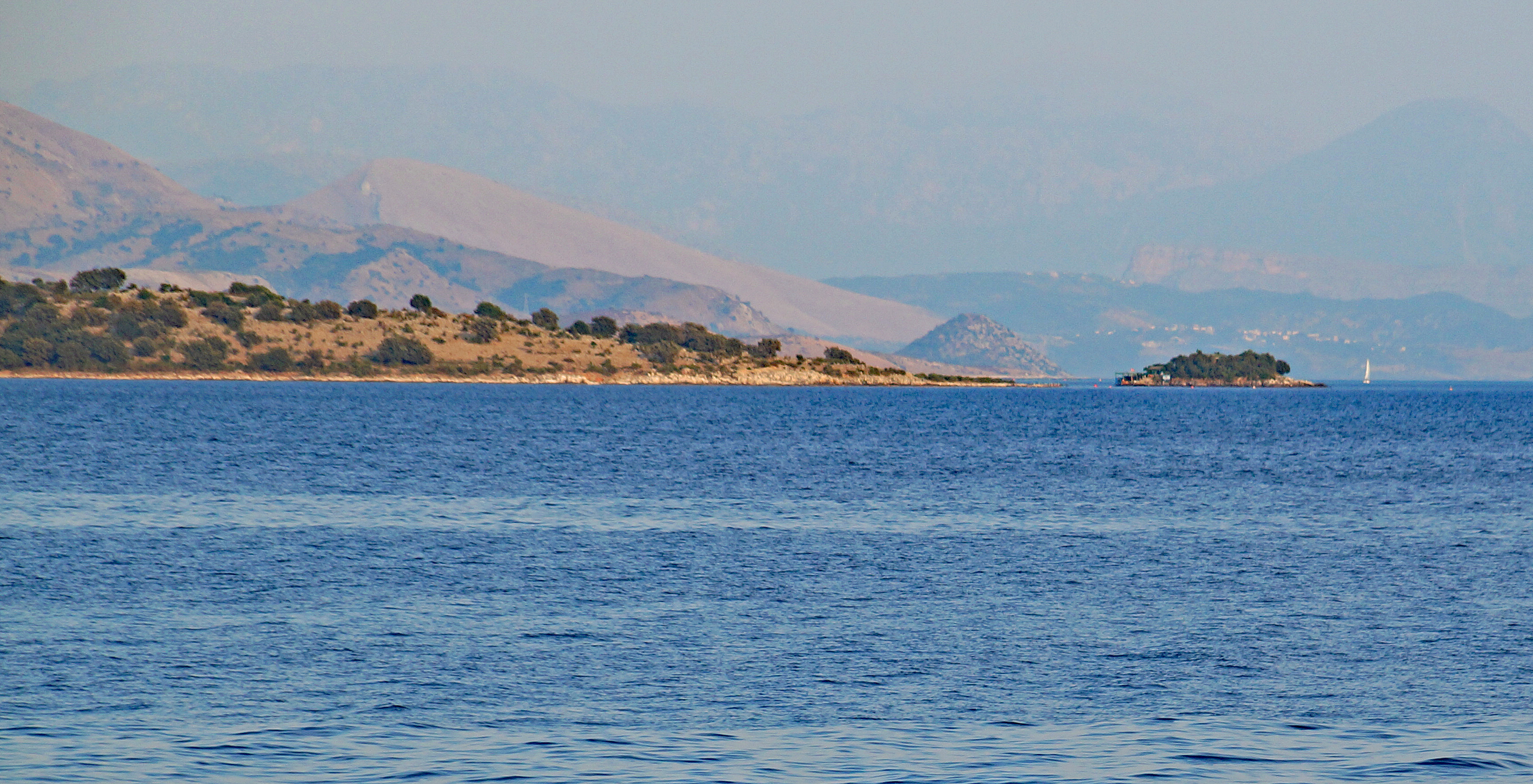
- Stillo Islet from a distance

- Location within Albania

Geography
- Location: Ionian Sea
- Coordinates: 39°41′07″N 19°59′23″E
- Area: 0.6 ha (1.5 acres)
- Area rank: 10th
- Length: 80 m (260 ft)
- Width: 110 m (360 ft)

Administration
- Albania
- County: Vlorë County
- Municipality: Konispol

Stillo Islet (Albanian: Ishulli i Stillos) or Stil Islet is a small islet located in Xarrë, southern Albania, on the Ionian Sea.

== Geography ==
Situated 200 m (660 ft) off the shoreline of Cape Stillo, it is the furthest point south in terms of coastline within the Albanian territory. The rocky islet is sparsely vegetated and has an approximate length of 80 m (260 ft), a width of 110 m (360 ft) and a total surface area of 0.6 ha (1.5 acres).

Small and unexplored, the islet referred to as Kepi i Stillos, is mainly visited by locals from the nearby towns of Ksamil and Konispol.

Up until 1992, the islet and the cape from which it gets its name were off-limits to civilians and served as restricted military areas. It was later visited by school students on boat excursions, while today it is not included in any tourist guide.

== See also ==
- Tourism in Albania
- Albanian Riviera
- Geography of Albania
