= Adriatik Hotel =

Hotel in Durrës, Albania

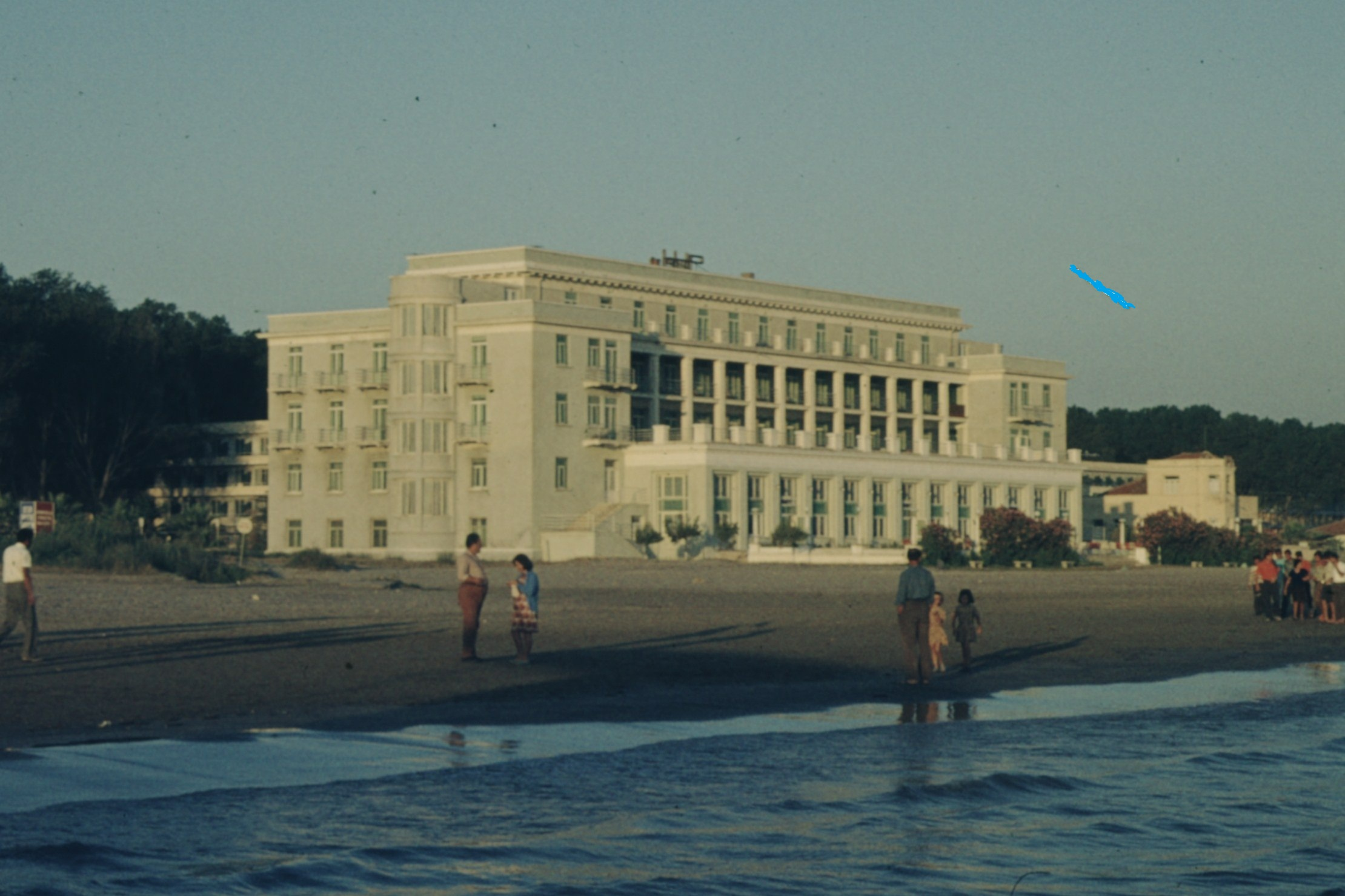

- Location within Albania

General information
- Location: Durrës, Albania
- Coordinates: 41°18′19″N 19°29′29″E

Technical details
- Floor count: 5

Other information
- Number of rooms: 70
- Number of restaurants: 2 ( and 3 bars)

Website
- www.adriatikhotel.com

Adriatik Hotel is a hotel near Durrës, Albania. This is the main tourist hotel in Durrës, located on the long sandy beach to the south. With origins tracing back to 1957, it contains 70 rooms and was built during the Stalin era. An early reference to the facilities is contained in an article written for The Atlantic in 1963 by journalist James Cameron. By the time Philip Ward, author of Albania: A Travel Guide, visited in 1982 each bedroom was en suite but was still basic.

The hotel was extensively renovated in 2003 and now features the best swimming pool in the country.

== Themes ==
Each floor has a given theme; the Marubi Floor is the business hall, reception, library and 4 conference rooms with a set of paintings by Marubi.

The Doruntina Floor has 13 executive rooms, 8 standard rooms and 2 suites viewing the sea with paintings by Gentiana Gishti.

The Shqipëria Fantastike floor has 13 luxury rooms viewing the sea, 8 standard rooms and 2 suites viewing the sea as does the Tradita Shqiptare floor which contain paintings related to Albanian tradition.

== Restaurants ==
The hotel is served by two restaurants serving Italian cuisine.
