= Velipojë =

Village and former municipality in Shkodër, Albania

- Municipality
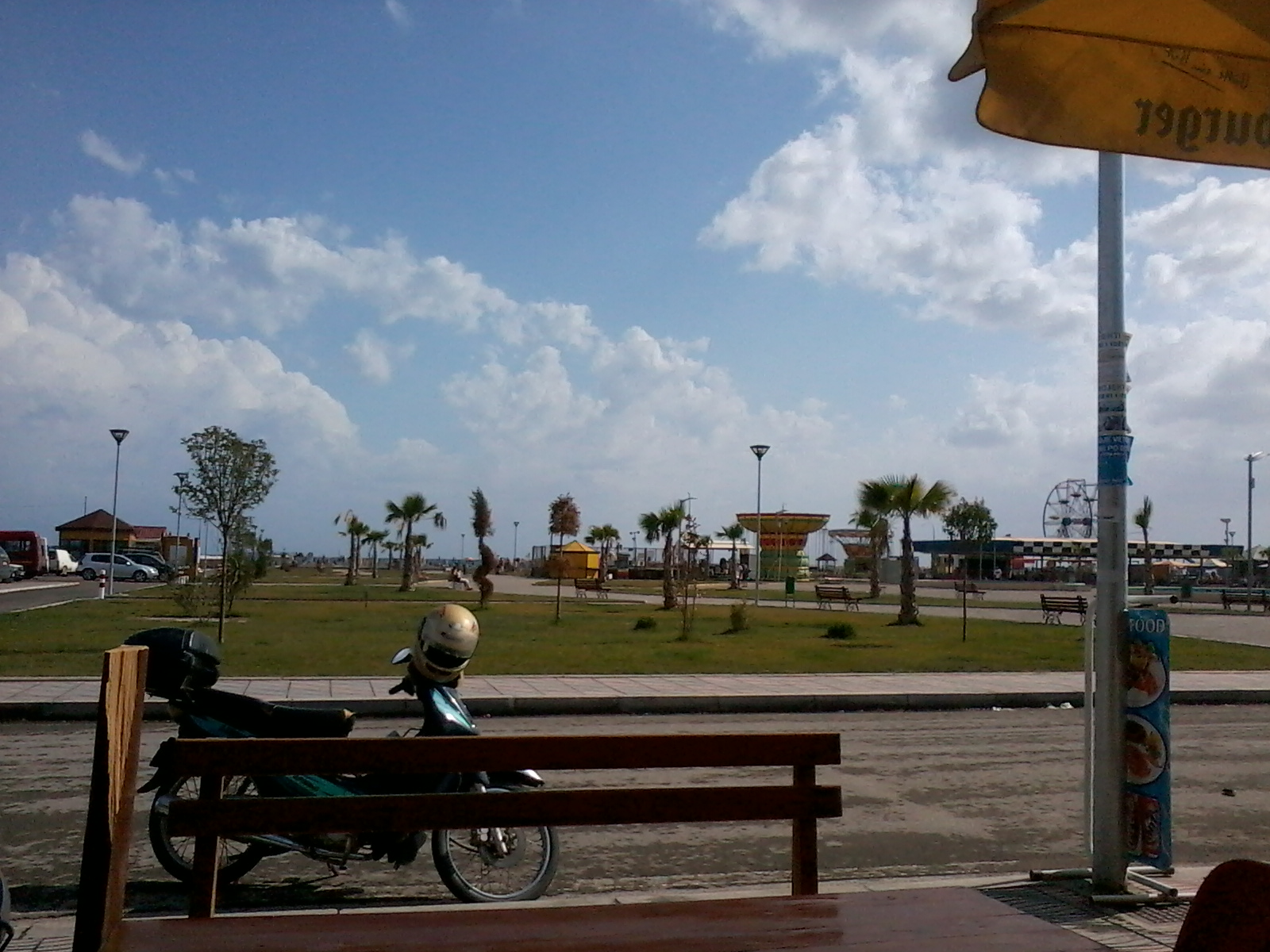
- Velipoja Town Square

- Location within Albania
- Coordinates: 41°51′53″N 19°25′48″E
- Country: Albania
- County: Shkodër
- Elevation: 0 m (0 ft)

Population (2011)
  - Administrative unit: 5,031
- Time zone: UTC+1 (CET)
  - Summer (DST): UTC+2 (CEST)
- Postal Code: 4020
- Area Code: 0267

Velipojë (Albanian definite form: Velipoja) is a village and a former municipality in Shkodër County, northwestern Albania. At the 2015 local government reform, it became a subdivision of the municipality of Shkodër. The population at the 2011 census was 5,031.

== Etymology ==
The name Velipoje comes from the Slavic word Velikopoje, which in English translates to the Great Plain. The name would have been given during one of the many times the Slavs invaded Albania.

== Geography ==
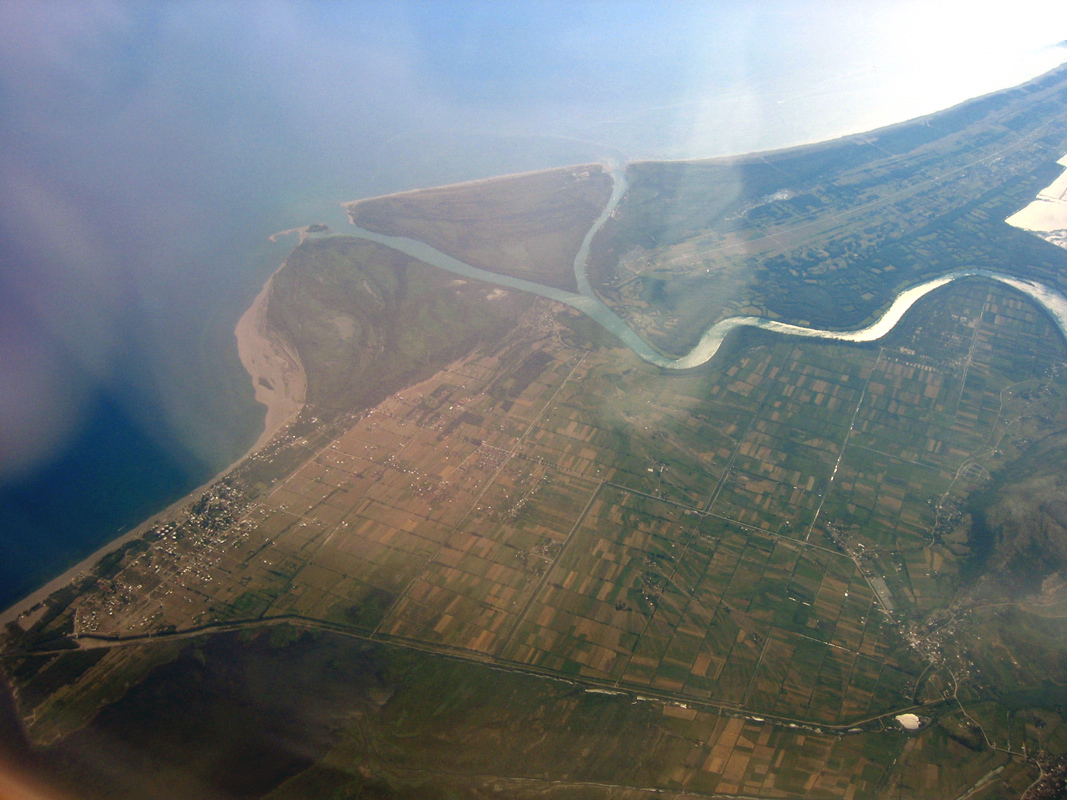
The Buna estuary with Velipojë to the left

Velipojë is situated on the estuary of the Buna river (the only navigable river of Albania), where it flows into the Adriatic Sea while constituting the natural border with Montenegro.

The administrative unit of Velipojë has a population of around 10,000, spread over several small settlements, the largest of which is the town of Velipojë itself. Since 2005, Velipoje has been within the boundaries of the Buna River-Velipoja Protected Landscape.

=== Economy ===
Velipojë's economy is based on agriculture, tourism, and some fishing. There have also been recent efforts to develop fish farming.

=== Tourism ===
A long, sandy, curative beach with a seaside promenade is a popular attraction in the summer. The village hosts the Land and Sand Art Festival, which consists of carving sand sculptures along the beach.

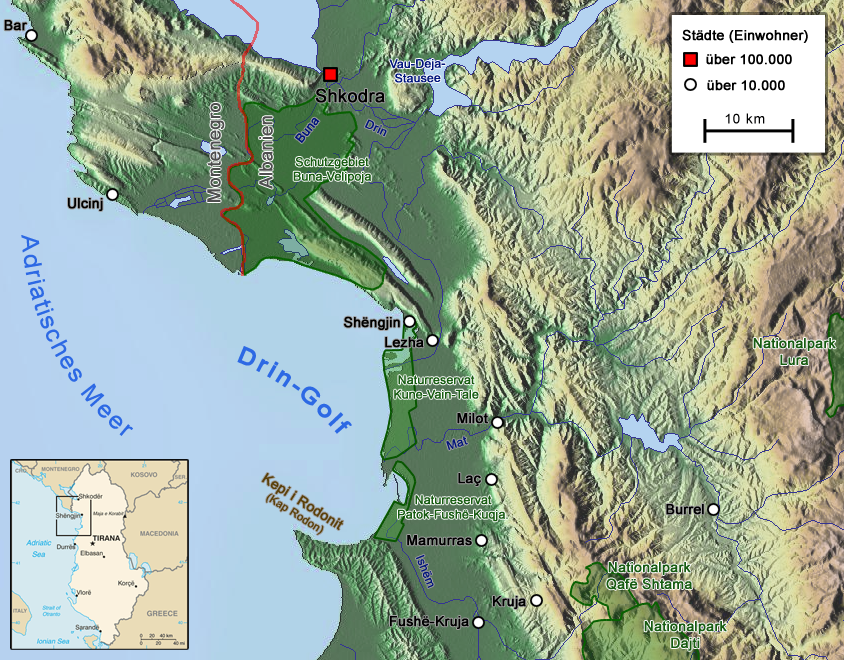
Coastal protected areas near Velipoja and Shengjin

In recent years, several projects have been instituted with the aim of conserving the environment (including the marine life of the Buna) and encouraging ecological tourism. The scenery is largely unspoiled, a mixture of seacoast, river estuary, heathland, thick pine woods, farmland, and high mountains. The area is a prime site for birdwatching, game shooting, and fishing.

Historically a poor area, and like the rest of the country subject to much emigration, Velipojë has recently begun to expand as a tourist resort, favoured especially by the inhabitants of Shkodër, the chief city of northern Albania, which lies about 30 km (19 mi) inland. The construction of the highway that started in 2021, linking Shëngjin with Velipojë, is expected to further develop tourism and the local economy.

== Education ==
In the commune, there is a church-sponsored kindergarten, several primary schools, two secondary schools, and one gymnasium.

== Culture and sports ==
There is also a small theatre and a local football team, KS Ada Velipojë.

== See also ==
- Buna River-Velipoja Protected Landscape
- Shengjin
- Albanian Adriatic Sea Coast
- Albanian Riviera
- Tourism in Albania
