= Himarë (town) =

Town in Vlorë County, Albania

Himarë Χειμάρρα
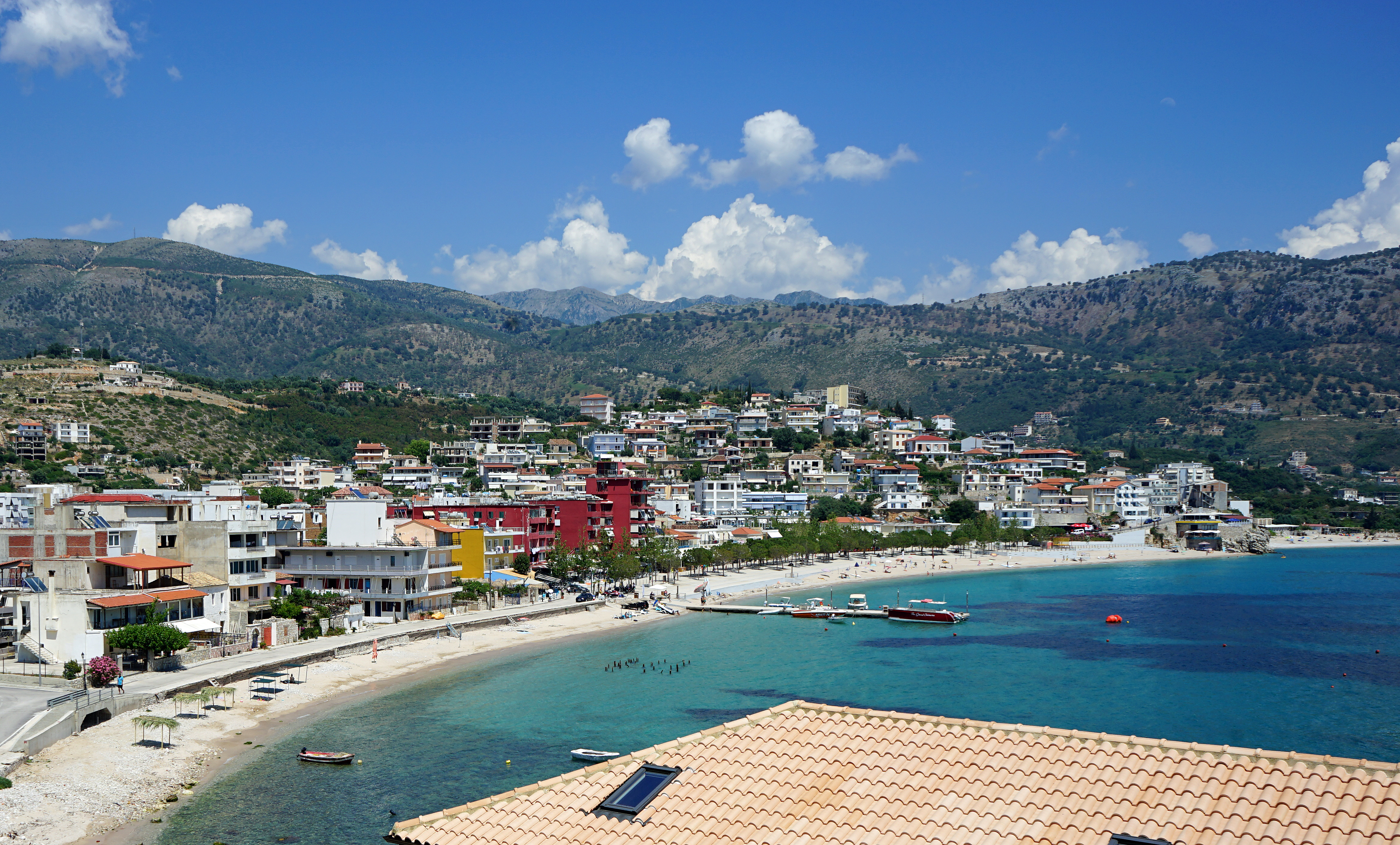
- Interactive map of Himarë
- Coordinates: 40°6′5″N 19°44′48″E
- Country: Albania
- County: Vlorë
- Municipality: Himarë

Government
  - Mayor: Vangjel Tavo (PS)
- Postal code: 9425
- Area code: 0393
- Website: www.himara.gov.al

Himarë (Albanian definite form: Himara, Greek: Χειμάρρα, romanized: Himárra) is a town in Southern Albania along the Albanian Riviera and part of the Vlorë County. It is the largest settlement and the seat of the municipality of Himarë. Its population is predominantly Greek.

== History ==
In antiquity the region was inhabited by the Epirote tribe of the Chaonians. The town of Himarë is believed to have been founded as Χίμαιρα, (Chimaira or Chimaera, hence the name Himara) by the Chaonians as a trading outpost on the Chaonian shore. However, another theory according to the name suggest that comes from Greek χείμαρρος (cheimarros), meaning "torrent". The Chaonian castle in Himara appears to belong to the set of the earliest Chaonian fortifications. Its ancient walls probably date to the 5th-4th centuries BC. In antiquity the town was known for its mineral springs. Nearby Panormοs, must have served as one of the town's harbors considering that the beaches of Spile and Livadh in the open bay below the town are unsuitable for sheltering vessels during marine storms.

The town of Himara during the 16th-18th centuries was ecclesiastically under the jurisdiction of Rome, and some of its inhabitants were Catholics of the Eastern rite.

Himarë is recorded in the Ottoman defter of 1583 as a settlement in the Sanjak of Delvina with a total of 130 households. The anthroponymy recorded predominantly belonged to the Albanian onomastic sphere (e.g., Gjok Dhim Gjini, Dedë Kola, Gjika Gjoni, Lika Kondi), however, personal names reflecting broader Orthodox Christian anthroponymy are also recorded – including Greek (e.g., Thanas Jorgonllu).

The Italian missionary Giuseppe Schirò wrote in 1722 that the town of Himarë was inhabited by Greeks.

In the Ottoman census of 1895 in the town of Himara around 220 houses were counted, being also the center of a Nahiyah that consisted of seven settlements.

After World War II the town was not included by the state system of minority schooling inside the Albanian state, and as such from 1946 until 2006, there had been no education in the Greek language.

== Old and new town ==
The town of Himara consists of the old settlement (Fshat) located at the top of a hill overlooking the Ionian Sea which coincides with the location of the ancient settlement of Chimarra.

The modern settlement is located on the adjacent coast centered on Spilë. It is the administrative and financial center of the municipality of Himarë. Commercial services, schools, a health center and organized sports facilities are also located in Spilë. The settlement was developed during the Socialist Post-World War II era.

== Monuments ==
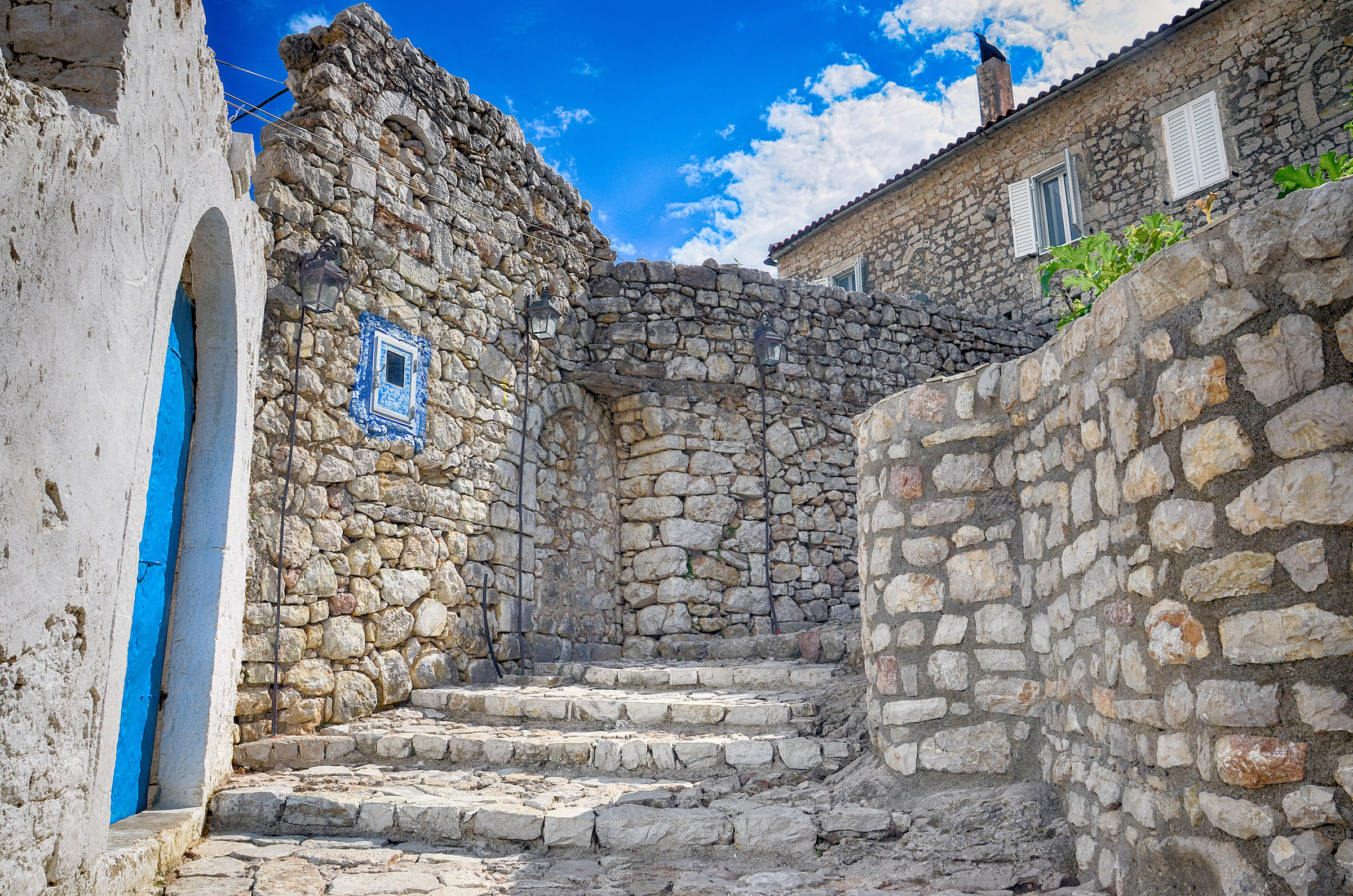
View from the old town inside the castle district

One of the main attractions is the castle located in the old town of Himara. A number of Orthodox churches are located there among them Panagia Kassopitra, Saint Sergios and Bakchos (11th century), Saint Michael (13th century). and the All Saints.

== Beaches ==
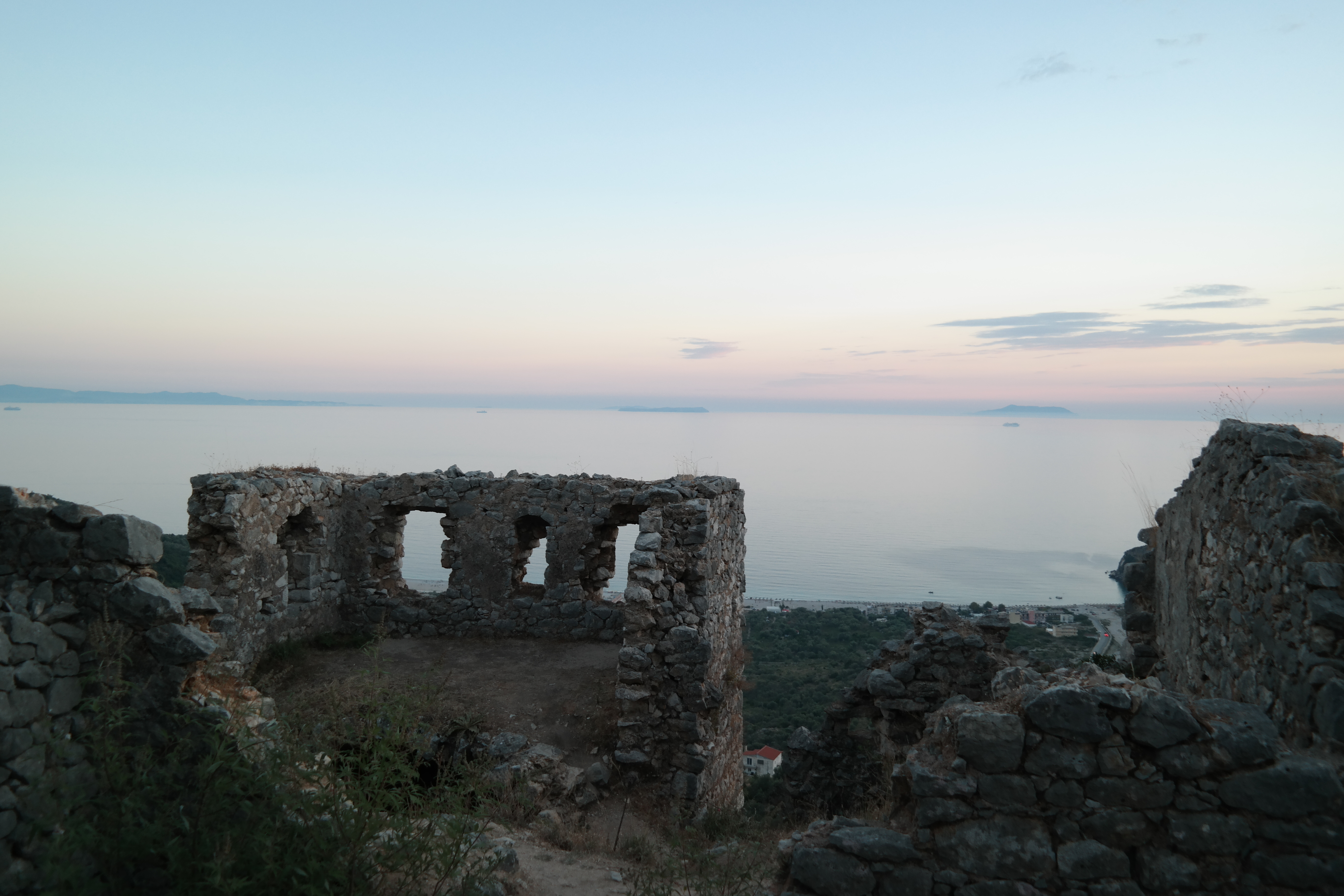
View towards Livadhi beach as seen from the castle

The beaches that are found in the town of Himara or directly linked to the town are located in Spile, Potam, Llaman and Livadhi.

== Demographics ==
In 1990 the population of the town was estimated to 5,224: The old town Fshat and Shen Mehill with 1,595 was inhabited by a Greek community, while Spile with 3,629 inhabitants was predominantly Greek including also less numerous communities of Albanian Christians and Muslims (the latter c. 1,000).

In 2005 according to the Albanian Civil Registry offices the town has a population of 5,418.

== Language ==
The locals of the town of Himara mainly use the local Greek dialect and partly a Tosk Albanian dialect. Having lived in present-day Albania, the local ethnic Greeks are fairly balanced bilinguals in both their local Greek and Albanian varieties.

Although the town of Himara is geographically located on the northern borders of the Greek-speaking world in the Balkans, local Greek speech in the town is classified as a part of the southern Modern Greek. However, the speech of the adjacent villages of Palasë and Dhërmi is classified as semi-northern Greek.

== Notable people ==
- Christos Bekas, Greek Army general in the Greek War of Independence (1821–1830)
- Vasil Bollano, former mayor of Himarë and President of the organization of the Greek minority, "Omonoia"
- Pyrros Dimas, Greek weight-lifting athlete
- Christos Armandos Gezos, Greek novelist and poet
- Kostas Kaznezis, Greek Army general in the Greek War of Independence
- Zachos Milios (1805–1860), Greek Army officer and revolutionary
- Sotiris Ninis (born 3 April 1990), Greek footballer
- Spyromilios (1800–1880), Greek Army general and politician
- Spyros Spyromilios (1864–1930), Greek Gendarmerie officer, declared the region's autonomy (1914)
- Pyrros Spyromilios (1913–1961), Greek Navy officer
- Neço Muko (1899–1934), Traditional Albanian music Singer and Composer
- Fredis Beleris (born 9 August 1972) is a Greek politician, a Member of the European Parliament for Greece

== See also ==
- Himara
- Greeks in Albania
- Tourism in Albania

== Bibliography ==
- Çipa, Kriledjan (2017). "Himara in the Hellenistic period. Analysis of Historical, epigraphic and Archaeological Sources". Novaensia. 28.
- Gregorič, Nataša (2008). "Contested Spaces and Negotiated Identities in Dhërmi/Drimades of Himarë/Himara area, Southern Albania" (PDF). University of Nova Gorica.
- Kyriazis, Doris (2016). "Γλωσσικές επαφές και διαστρωματώσεις στην περιοχή Χιμάρας". Βορειοηπειρωτικά (in Greek). 5. Aristotle University of Thessaloniki.
- Triantis, Loukas (2016). "The Politics of Space, Institutional Change and International Development: the Area of Himara/Albania during the post-Socialist Transition". Didaktorika.gr (in Greek). Athens National Polytechnic. doi:10.12681/eadd/37436. hdl:10442/hedi/37436.
