= Himariote dialect =

Dialect of Greek spoken in the Himarë region of Albania

Himariote Greek
- Χειμαρριώτικα
- Region: Himarë, Albania, Greece
- Language family: Indo-European: Hellenic; Greek; (disputed); Attic–Ionic; Attic; Koine; Southern Greek; Northern Epirote; Himariote Greek

Language codes
- ISO 639-3: –
- Glottolog: hima1251
- IETF: el-u-sd-al12

Himariote Greek (Greek: Χειμαρριώτικη διάλεκτος, romanized: Cheimarriṓtikī diálektos [çimaɾˈʝo̞tici ˈðjale̞kto̞s] or Χειμαρριώτικα, Cheimarriṓtika [çimaɾˈʝo̞tika]; Albanian: Dialekti himariot) is a dialect of the Greek language that is mainly spoken by ethnic Greeks in the Himara region of Albania. Despite the small distances between the settlements in the region, there exists some dialectal variation, most prominently in accent.

== Geography ==
The dialect is used as the language of communication in the villages of Himara, Dhërmi and Palasë and as a learned language in the villages of Vuno, Qeparo, Kudhës and Pilur. Based on the geographical distribution of the local toponyms a linguistic boundary between local Greek speech and adjacent Albanian coincides with the direction of the mountain range that separates western Himara from the mountainous hinterland.

== Classification ==
As part of the Greek dialects spoken in Albania, known also as Northern Epirote dialects, the dialect of Himara is part of the linguistic continuum of the dialects of modern Greek.

Despite the fact that the Greek community in Himara resides at the northern end of the Greek-speaking world, in a region known among Greeks as Northern Epirus, the Himariote dialect is a southern dialect of the Greek language, a trait shared by most other dialects in southern Albania and Greek prefecture of Thesprotia. Although links with the Greek dialects spoken in Apulia and Mani have been suggested, the exact provenance of Northern Epirote dialects remains obscure. According to Greek linguist Vayacacos, Himariote, as a subbranch of the Northern Epirote dialects, is classified as a southern dialect, but the two towns next to Himarë, Dhërmi and Palasë, speak semi-northern dialects.

Because of the region's geography and isolation, the local dialect in the Himarë region became separated from the surrounding dialects and underwent a slower evolution, preserving a more conservative and faithful picture of the medieval Greek vernacular. According to Greek professor Anagnostopoulos, this dialect, like other conservative forms of modern Greek, such as the Maniot dialect, was spoken by populations that lived in virtual autonomy during Ottoman rule. Another linguistic analysis suggests that Himarë was colonised by Apulian Italiots after the Turkish raid on Otranto in 1480, but this position is vigorously questioned. Some scholars have argued that there are parallels with the local idioms spoken in Crete as well as in nearby Corfu. In particular, these scholars argue that the dialect of Himarë has parallels with dialects in Crete, whereas the dialect of Dhërmi and Palasë has parallels with those in Corfu.

== Influences ==
The dialect has been affected by pressures from standard varieties of Greek/Albanian and emigration.

The conservative Greek dialect spoken in Himara has been under pressured by various other types of Greek, such as the language used by the Greek Orthodox Church as well as from the Greek idioms from nearby Ioannina and Corfu.

In spite of the short distances between these towns, there are differences in the accents of the dialect in every town. Himariote has been affected by language contact, and uses some borrowed words from the Lab Albanian dialect. Some Greek words have also been partially influenced by their Albanian counterparts, such as the local pronunciation of [mexanikos] for Standard Greek [mixanikos] ("engineer"), under the influence of Albanian mekaniku. Among those who identify as Greeks in Himara there is near equal proficiency with Albanian, although there also are monolingual Greek speakers among the older generations. This may be explained by mixed marriages with Albanian elements on the part of the ancestors of the Himara Greeks and Hellenization of the local Albanian population via policies encouraged by the Greek Orthodox Church and accentuated by the differences in cultural norms among Christians and Muslims.

Compared to the nearby Albanian idioms that are spoken both inland (Kurvelesh) and in the coastal region in Himara, Himariote Greek is less affected by Slavic influence.

The continuous presence of Himariote Greek is also supported by the fact that the idiom of the adjacent Albanian-speaking settlements has been widely influenced by Greek features.

== Phonology ==
A common characteristic of local Greek dialects including Himariote is the use of the archaic disyllabic -ea form. Moreover, the phoneme /s/ is pronounced in a slightly different way, depending on the town: in Dhërmi as a soft /ś/; in Palasa as a half-hard /š’/ while in the town of Himarë as a hard /š/. The people who originate from Himarë sometimes also pronounce /k/ as /ts/. Many younger speakers do not use "hard accentuations" anymore, due to the widespread influence by standard modern Greek in the context of migratory patterns to Greece.

== History ==
=== Coexistence with Albanian ===
It's unclear when Albanians and Greeks arrived in the Himara region and when contacts between the two groups began. Nevertheless, contacts between them hardly started later than the 13th or 14th century.

Multi-lingualism has been historically attested in Himarë at least since the beginning of the 16th century. In 1500, the Himariotes were considered Albanians, but Greek was also spoken, though in a "barbaric" manner. "In-group" Himariote letters during the same period (1532, 1578) indicate that Himariotes consisted of both Albanians and non-Albanians. The Italian missionary Giuseppe Schiro, who visited the region, wrote during the same period (1722) that the settlements of Himarë (town), Dhërmi, and Palasë were ethnically Greek, while the rest ethnically Albanian. In 1759, Himariot leaders wrote to the Russian representatives in Greek that the population speaks Albanian, the same language spoken at neighbouring Albania and Bosnia; in many areas all learned speak Greek, while noble families spoke even Italian. The representatives of Himare that year consisted of both the traditional coastal settlements, as well as many more from the coast and inland.

They all wrote in the Greek dialect of the region in their "in-group" communication, mixed with Albanian, Turkish, Italian and some Arabic words. They used Greek in their correspondence with the Pope and other representatives of western countries, as well as with the Russian Empire. When they communicated in Italian, they used a translator, but signed in Greek, with Greek conferments of their names. Their preference of writing in Greek was conscious and not imposed by any conditions or a secretariat. Eqrem Vlora wrote at the turn of the 19th century that among Himariotes there were only 3,000 who had always been Greek-speaking. According to him, they were of a single Greek line of descent, regardless how old it was.

Although Albanian has been the state language as well as the sole language of administration and education during the last half of 20th century in Himara, it has not led to its dominance over Greek.

=== Archaisms and unique features ===
More recent research focusing on the study of local idioms have added to historically documented knowledge. Himariote Greek has isoglosses that link it to a broader dialectal continuum throughout time, that comprises the Greek varieties from Sarandë, Delvinë, Gjirokastër, Nartë, Ionian Islands (including the Diapontia), and southern Italy; however, it has distinctive characteristics that don't support its origin from any other Greek-speaking area. Τhe existence of toponyms with the -eos (–έος) suffix in modern Himara (such as Δραλέος, Ελατέος, Κασανέος, etc.), relate it to the medieval dialect of the Ionian islands which also used -éos genitive suffixes in toponyms; as attested in the mid-13th century. In turn, from Himariote Greek they became -e suffix toponyms in the local Albanian dialect. This medieval attestation of -éos toponyms indicates an old emergence of the Himariote dialect. Other evidence that support the early dating of Himariote Greek are the appellations and toponyms associated with old Greek dialects (both ancient and medieval). Continuous presence of Himariote Greek without intervals is attested by its rich Doric substratum and archaic features. In Palasa, lexical borrowings from Albanian into the local Greek dialect have been found in terminology concerning village life, indicating that the culture of the village was originally Albanian and reflecting the function of the older language (Albanian) as prevailing in affairs of village life.

The use of words that possibly preserve the digamma in the Himara (βρόζος, “ρόζος/knot”. βράγα “ρώγα σταφυλιού/grape”) also points to the archaic character of the local speech.

Himariote was among the few Greek dialects that did retained non-synizesis forms, a typical feature in medieval Greek language that occurred as late as 13th century.

=== 20th century developments and politics ===
During the communist era in Albania, the country's borders were sealed for 45 years (1945–1990), while Himarë remained outside of the so-called Greek minority zone, which the Albanian state recognized as Greek populated regions. In accordance with the communist Albanian policy of unification and homogenization, the use of the Greek language in Himarë was forbidden in public, and many Greek-speaking people were forced to move to places in northern or central Albania. As a consequence, Greek schools in the Himarë area were closed, and the local communities stuck to their language, which was archaic in comparison to the dialects they encountered after emigrating to Greece (1991) in the aftermath of the communist regime's collapse.

After the fall of communism, a considerable number of the population from Himarë migrated to Greece where it largely adopted standard Greek. At present they are still not considered as part of the recognized Greek minority by the Albanian state, while on the other hand they are counted as ethnic Greeks according to the Greek migration policy. There is an overall reduction in the competence of the dialect by its speakers. Those who have emigrated from Himara, especially the younger generation, are no longer active speakers of it.

== Written accounts ==
Correspondence of the Himariotes to foreign European powers was written in their local Greek dialect. A letter to the archbishop of Otranto, at 1577, indicates that their preference to writing in Greek was conscious and not imposed by any conditions or secretariat, while they signed in Greek with Greek conferments of their names.

Written traces of the Himariote dialect can also be seen by a letter of 1814. A novel by Christos Armandos Gezos was written in 2021 in the Himariote dialect.

== Sources ==
- Joseph, Brian; Novik, Alexander; Sobolev, Andrey; Spiro, Aristotle (2018). "Greek and Albanian in Palasa and Environs: A Report from the Field" (PDF). Proceedings of the 8th International Conference of Modern Greek Dialects and Linguistic Theory (MGDLT8) Gjirokastër, 4-6 October 2018.
- Rusakov, Alexander (2021). "Contemporary Language Contacts in the Balkans: Situations and Outcomes". In Sobolev, Andrey (ed.). Between Separation and Symbiosis: South Eastern European Languages and Cultures in Contact. de Gruyter. ISBN 978-1501509254.
- Bon, Nataša Gregorič (2008a). "Contested Spaces and Negotiated Identities in Dhërmi/Drimades of Himarë/Himara Area, Southern Albania" (PDF). Nova Gorica, Slovenia: University of Nova Gorica.
- Bon, Nataša Gregorič (2008b). "Storytelling as a Spatial Practice in Dhërmi/Drimades of Southern Albania" (PDF). Anthropological Notebooks. 14 (2). Slovene Anthropological Society: 7–29. ISSN 1408-032X.
- Nicholas, Nick (December 1998). "The Story of pu: The Grammaticalisation in Space and Time of a Modern Greek Complementiser (Appendix A. ˚History & Diatopy of Greek")". Melbourne, Victoria, Australia: University of Melbourne.
- Pettifer, James (2001). The Greek Minority in Albania - In the Aftermath of Communism. Camberley, Surrey: Conflict Studies Research Centre, Royal Military Academy Sandhurst. ISBN 1-903584-35-3. Archived from the original (PDF) on 2010-05-21.
- Kyriazis, Doris (2006). "Η σχέση του ελληνικού γλωσσικού ιδιώματος της Χιμάρας με τα άλλα νεοελληνικά ιδιώματα". Studies in Greek Linguistics: Proceedings of the Annual Meeting of the Department of Linguistics, School of Philology, Faculty of Philosophy at Aristotle University of Thessaloniki (May 6–7, 2006) (in Greek). Vol. 27. Aristotle University of Thessaloniki (published 2007). pp. 198–209. ISBN 978-960-231-125-7.
- Kyriazis, Doris (2016). "Γλωσσικές επαφές και διαστρωματώσεις στα αλβανικά και ελληνικά ιδιώματα της περιοχής Bregu i Detitsti". Βορειοηπειρωτικά (in Greek). Aristotle University of Thessaloniki.
- Kyriazis, Doris (2020). "Rreth diakronisë dhe diatopisë së të folmeve greqisht të Shqipërisë së Jugut ("Dialog" me të paharruarin Prof. Sh. Demirajn)". In Çepani, Anila; Skënderi-Rakipllari, Elsa (eds.). AKTE TË KONFERENCËS SHKENCORE NDËRKOMBËTARE: SHABAN DEMIRAJ, PERSONALITET I GJUHËSISË, ARSIMIT DHE I KULTURËS SHQIPTARE (in Albanian). Tirana: Fakulteti i Historisë dhe i Filologjisë – Universiteti i Tiranës. pp. 33–52.
- Giakoumis, Konstantinos (2016). "Self-identifications by Himarriots, 16th to 19th Centuries". Erytheia. 37.
