= Qeparo =

Qeparo Κηπαρό
- Village
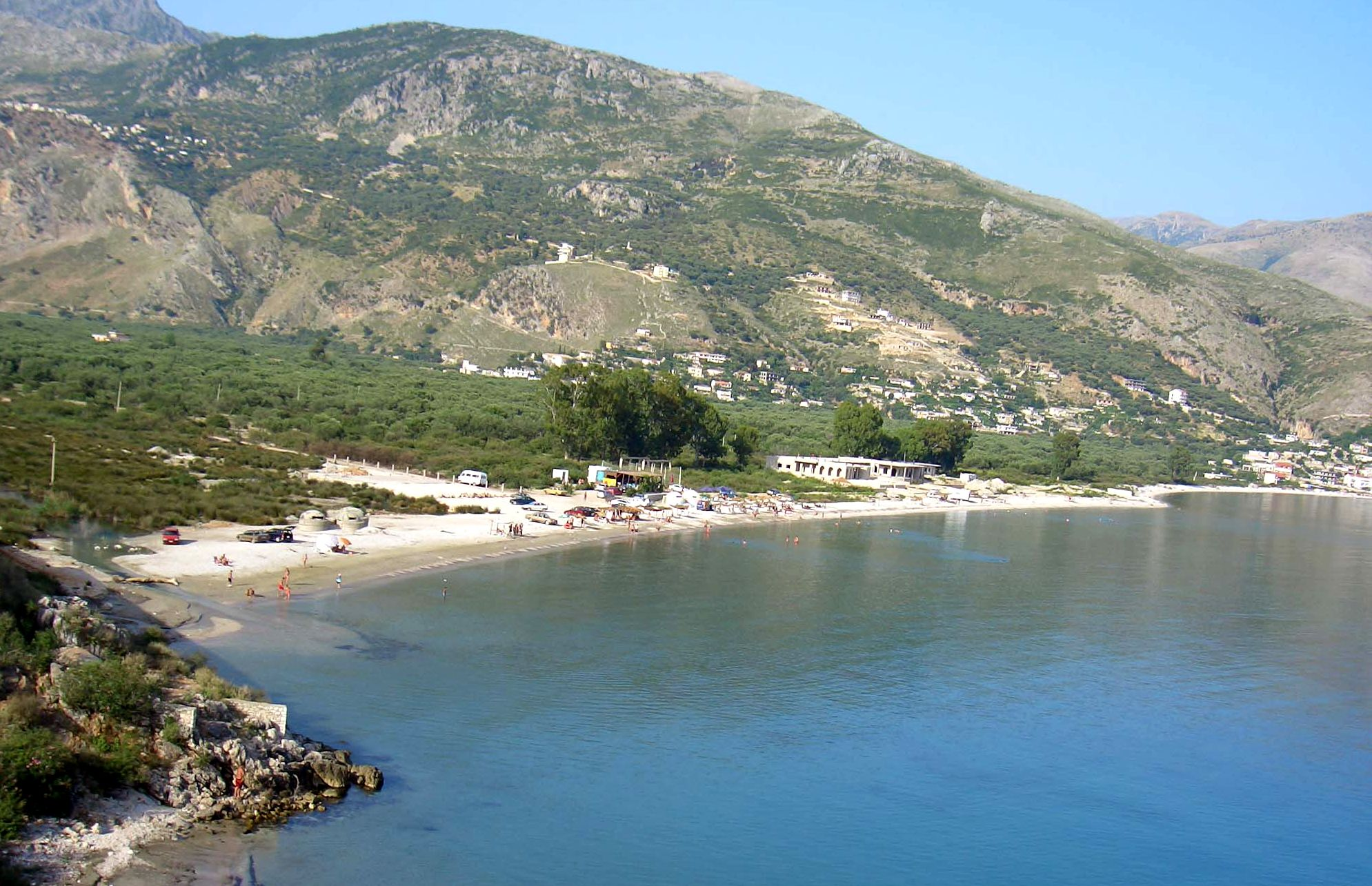
- Qeparo village and the bay on the Ionian Sea

- Location within Albania
- Coordinates: 40°3′9″N 19°49′45″E
- Country: Albania
- County: Vlorë
- Municipality: Himarë
- Administrative unit: Himarë
- Elevation: 450 m (1,480 ft)

Population (2005)
  - Total: 1,563
- Time zone: UTC+1 (CET)
  - Summer (DST): UTC+2 (CEST)

Qeparo (Albanian definite form: Qeparoi; Greek: Κηπαρό, Kiparo) is a seaside village in the municipality of Himara in Vlorë County, Albania. The village is part of the Albanian Riviera and is divided into two parts – Upper or Old Qeparo on higher ground, and Lower or New Qeparo on the coast. Qeparo is an Albanian-speaking village.

== Name ==
The first identified form of the name of the village is "Clapero" in the 1566 correspondence of the people of Himara who were seeking refuge from the Ottoman Empire with the Kingdom of Naples. The name is thought to derive from the word kllapë and the Greek suffix -erό, which is commonly used in toponyms (e.g. Vromero). As "kllapë/klapa" has nearly the same meaning in the local Albanian and Greek dialects, the question arises as to whether the name is Albanian or Greek. The form Qeparo is a later innovation which was produced via vowel metathesis and the typical shift of /kl/ to /q/ in southern Albanian dialects.

== History ==
=== Antiquity and medieval period ===
Early and Middle Bronze Age fortifications have been found in Kukum, a hill to the west of the Qeparo basin that rises 100 m above sea level, and in Ngurë, a hill to the west of Qeparo basin that rises 70m above the sea level. Kukum's Early Bronze Age pottery and building techniques and pattern bear similarities to those of the same period found in Maliq, Shkodër, Gajtan and Mat. Those of Kukum are the earliest known buildings on the Albanian Ionian Sea Coast.

Mycenaean Greek Buchholz IV double axes of the final stage of the LBA palatial system (1100-1030 BC) have been found in the location Shafka e Kudhësit between Qeparo and Kudhës. Similar items which originated in the Aegean region were imported throughout the territory of what is now Albania during this period.

Fortifications with multiple-row walls dating back to the Late Bronze Age and Early Iron Age have been found in the Karos castle in Qeparo. The settlements in what would become western Chaonia, including Karos, were probably fortified in the LBA and EIA due to internal as well as external factors. Among the internal factors was the process of socio-economic differentiation, with the emergence of an aristocratic class and the consequent conflicts between settlements that required defence structures. Among the external factors could have been the pressure from neighbouring territories of Greece, due to the uncertainty and turmoil that started with the collapse of the Mycenaean civilization and continued in the Dark Ages (12th–8th centuries BCE). Determining the ethnic belonging of these fortifications is problematic, and it should be associated to the study of the culture of these fortifications, in relation to the culture of the same period discovered in the area of Shkodra, Mati and in eastern Albania. The Late Bronze Age fortification of Karos shares common typological features with that of the castle of nearby Himara.

Karos also has a type of Early Iron Age fortifications with a more advanced architectural composition featuring several wall enclosures. Archaeological evidence so far shows that the planimetric structure of these Iron Age Karos-type fortifications was a characteristic of the border area between Illyria and Epirus, and that the architecture of Karos was influenced by the nearby area of Amantia, where similar structures can be found. In terms of the planimetric structures they find parallels with similar settlements in the rest of the territory of Chaonia and southern Illyria, but they are different from the prehistoric fortified villages of Molossia, which on the other hand clearly display an organization of the inhabited spaces and provide evidence for a continuous habitation from the Bronze Age to the Hellenistic period.

In classical antiquity the area made up the Chaonian coast, located in north-western Epirus. Hellenistic, Roman and Late Antiquity archaeological material found on the surface near these fortifications and on the archaeological excavations in some of them, is related to the establishment of the komai (Greek: κώμη/κώμαι, "unwalled village(s)") type rural settlements, which were built near them. The inhabitants of the komai should have used these abandoned fortified structures only in cases of danger. A Roman site has been found in Qeparo, dating back between the beginning of the imperial period and the 3rd century CE.

It has been suggested that the ancient fortification of Karos was reoccupied in late antiquity, with structures presumably dated to the 6th to 7th centuries CE, since some ceramics and pottery found on the site have been dated to the later Byzantine period.

=== Ottoman period ===
In 1501, villages in the Himara region were governed by their own elders, and the traditional meeting place of the region was in the locality of Spilea, near the village of Qeparo. Certain villages enjoyed more privileges than others, as they were provided with Kapedana - hereditary leaders with military roles, particularly regarding recruitment. The Gjika family held this title in Qeparo, and a major by the name of Atanasio Gjika was mentioned in Neapolitan documents relating to the king's recruitments in the region during the end of the 18th century. Apart from these Kapedana, the villages in the Himara region did not have unique leaders, but rather a council made up of the heads of the local fis or brotherhoods known as primates in relevant documents. In 1583 Kleparo (Qeparo) was listed among the villages of the Sopot Nahiye, which was an administrative division of the Sanjak of Albania within the Ottoman Empire.

In 1722, Qeparo was inhabited by ethnic Albanians. Eastern-rite missionary Giuseppe Schirò from the Arbëresh town of Piana degli Albanesi in Sicily, visited the Himara region in 1722 due to connections based on the founders of Piana degli Albanesi being from the region of Himara. In the same year, the villages of Himara, Palasa, Ilias, Vuno, Pilur and Qeparo refused to submit to the Pasha of Delvina.

The village has an Orthodox Church dedicated to Saint Demetrius, dated 1760, one of the nine churches in Albania today dedicated to that saint. The church was erected at a period when pressure for conversion to Islam was strong. Another church which is stands in the centre of the settlement is that of St. Mary and was erected in 1796.

The Greek school of Qeparo, which still stands today, dates to the early 19th century. It was built at a time when Greek education was thriving in the region. Later in 1860, a Greek school was sponsored by the Greek national benefactors Evangelos and Konstantinos Zappas. In 1898-1899 a total of three Greek schools were operating in Qeparo: elementary, secondary and a girls' school with a total of 100 students.

During the Balkan Wars (1912–1913) the locals attacked and killed communities from adjacent Muslim villages in fear that the later would be recruited by the Ottoman army against Qeparo. The locals of Qeparo were supported with ammunition by Greek units stationed in the area. Along with other adjacent villages residents of Qeparo and Vuno supported the armed operations of the Greek Army during the Balkan Wars.

=== Modern period ===
In 1912-1913 Qeparo was a Greek-speaking settlement. According to Martin Urban in 1938, Qeparo was among the Greek villages of Himara, with the Albanian ones being Pilur, Vuno and Kudhes. Nicholas Hammond described that the village formed in the 1930s on the southern border of the Greek-speaking pocket of which the town of Himara (town) was the centre.

During the interwar period, the village was Greek-speaking. After 1957, the village developed into two parts, New Qeparo where the population became concentrated and Old Qeparo. That year the government of the People's Republic of Albania built the main road along the coast which boosted economic and other opportunities in the area. The water channel built near the road was a factor that made people over time settle near the sea, resulting in the village becoming split into parts, Old Qeparo and New Qeparo. Coastal New Qeparo is the hub of both villages where government services are located and social activities take place. In post communist Albania, some two thirds of the village population emigrated from Qeparo. The remaining people were involved in developing the village by constructing new homes and focusing on raising the quality of life. Later, the wider area became a tourist destination and New Qeparo has had to deal with problems related to uncontrolled urban sprawl and population growth. Emigration mostly impacted Old Qeparo whose population has declined, with many old houses being uninhabited and in various states of disrepair.

== Geography ==
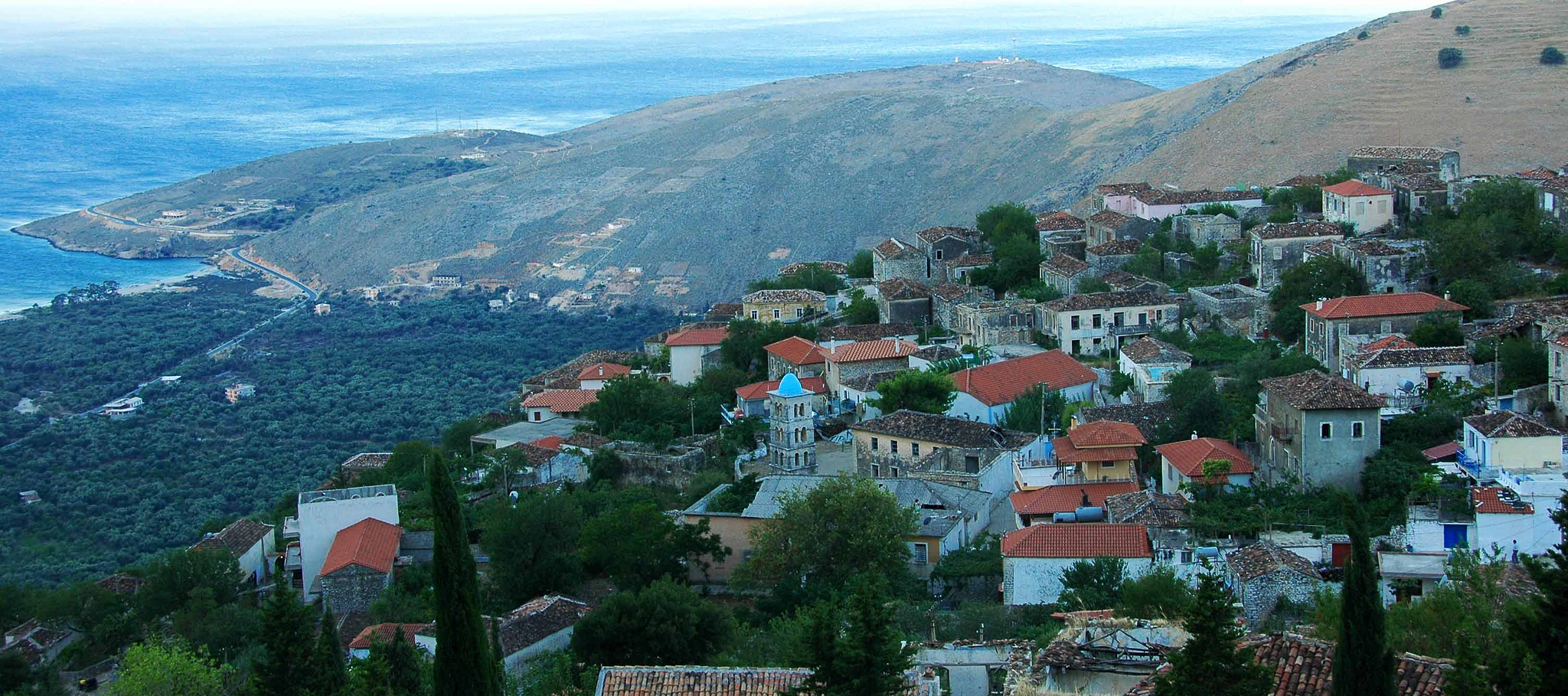
Old Qeparo

Qeparo is situated on the western slope of Mount Gjivlash, at about 450 metres (1,480 ft) above sea level. In ancient times, Qeparo was situated in the hill of Kasteli. Later on, its inhabitants settled a little further down, in the Gjivlash Slope, southeast of the hill of Kasteli, to be closer to their fields and to escape the cold of the winter. From 1957 onwards, Qeparo was split into the Old Village (Albanian: Fshati i vjetër, Greek: Άνω or Παλαιό Κηπαρό), and the New Village (Albanian: Fshati i ri, Greek: Κάτω or Νέο Κηπαρό).

To the east, Qeparo is bounded by the village of Borsh, to the northeast by Çorraj, to the north with Kudhës, to the northwest by Piluri, to the west with the town of Himara and to the south and southwest by the Ionian sea. The Porto Palermo Castle, probably built by the Venetian and later used by Ali Pasha to guard against the Himariotes is part of the territory of Qeparo.

Qeparo has cultivated olives for centuries, as mentioned in the early 19th century in the work of François Pouqueville, Napoleon Bonaparte's general consul at the court of Ali Pasha in Ioannina. Testimony to this, are some centennial olive trees still existing in the village.

== Demographics ==
Qeparo in the early 1990s was mainly inhabited by an Albanian speaking population, many being Orthodox Christians. Kallivretakis estimated in 1995 that an Orthodox Albanian population inhabited Qeparo Poshtme (lower neighbourhood) and a Greek population inhabited Qeparo Sipërme/Άνω Κηπαρό, Ano Kiparo (upper neighbourhood). A figure also accepted by Nitsiakos presenting the local demography in 2010. Today Qeparo is an Albanian-speaking village. Modern Qeparo is divided in two parts: the old part (or upper part) is located on a hill c. 300–400 metres above the sea level, while the new part (lower part) extends along the coastal road and slowly descends to the Ionian coast.

The Albanian local dialects, are part of southern Tosk, and more precisely, of the Labërisht sub-group. The Labërisht variant of Albanian spoken in Qeparo shares many features with the Arbëresh language which it is related to. The local Albanian idiom spoken in the village includes loanwords that go back to an old phase of the Greek language.

Greek loanwords also witness the tsitakism feature which is typical to various Greek idioms including the one of Himara, such in the case of foreshí (costume), shimé (flag). Qeparo is part of a common and barely traceable Greek language substratum area which includes both sides of the Ionian Sea as seen in local toponyms.

The village is composed of the following neighbourhoods or brotherhoods (Albanian: vëllazëri): Ballëguras, Bragjint' e Poshçërë, Bragjint' e Sipërmë, Dhimëgjonas, Gjikëbitaj, Mërtokaj, Ndregjin, Peçolat, Pogdan and Rushat. Every brotherhood had its own patron saint. Today the vast majority of the locals have moved to nearby Greece in search of permanent or seasonal work.

== Tourism ==
Qeparo is one of the favorite tourist destinations in the Albanian Riviera. Two hotels and a few guesthouses serve the tourists' enjoyment of the small beaches.

Famous attractions include: Frëngu Cave, Hunda e madhe, Skaloma Beach, and the ancient harbour.

== Notable people ==
- Persefoni Kokëdhima, Albanian Partisan, Hero of the People and member of Albanian National Liberation Movement
- Andon Qesari, Albanian actor and director.
- Georgios Stephanou, Greek Gendarmerie officer and revolutionary.
- Andrea Varfi, Albanian poet and nationalist.

== See also ==
- Albanian Riviera
- Dhërmi
- Himara

== Bibliography ==
- Joao, Rett Lemos; Rizky, Pratama Adh; Moutasem, Al Khnaifes; Ayse, Altinsoy (2018). Sustainable Models of Heritage Conservation and Revitalization: A Proposal for the Historic Villages of Vuno and Qeparo, Albania. Technische Universität Berlin. ISBN 978-3-9812769-8-5.
- Çipa, Kriledjan; Meshini, Mariglen (2016). "Të dhëna të reja rreth fortifikimeve paraurbane në Shqipërinë Jugperëndimore" [New data's of the preurban fortifications in the South-western of Albania]. Iliria. 40: 59–95.
- Floristán, J.M. (1992). "Los contractos de la Himarra con el reino de Napoles durante el siglo XVI y comienzos de XVII". Erytheia (13): 53–87.
- Gjipali, Ilir (2007). "Kërkime prehistorike në Shqipërinë Jugperëndimore / Prehistoric Research in the Southwestern Albania". Iliria. 33 (1): 107–133. doi:10.3406/iliri.2007.1067.
- Koçi, Jano (1991). "Fortifikimet parahistorike në bregdetin kaon /Les fortifications préhistoriques de la côte chaonienne". Iliria. 21: 39–64. doi:10.3406/iliri.1991.1581.
- Shpuza, Saimir (2022). La Romanisation de l'Illyrie méridionale et de la Chaônie. Collection de l'École française de Rome. Publications de l'École française de Rome. ISBN 9782728310982.
- Wasiucionek, Michal (2012). "Ethnic solidary in the wider Ottoman Empire revisited: cins and local political elites in 17th century Moldavia and Wallachia". In Sariyannis, Marinos (ed.). New Trends in Ottoman Studies: Papers presented at the 20th CIÉPO Symposium Rethymno, 27 June – 1 July 2012. University of Crete – Department of History and Archaeology.
- Qiriazi, Dhori (2008). "Review: N.Sotiri, E folmja dhe toponimia e Qeparoit [Ιδίωμα και τοπωνυμικό του Qeparó]" (PDF). Albanohellenica. 3.
