= Koço Muka =

Albanian policeman, politician

Ministry of Education
- In office 7 September 1944 – 28 August 1944
- Preceded by: Zef Benushi
- Succeeded by: Rrok Kolaj

Personal details
- Born: 1895 Himarë, Ottoman Albania
- Died: 21 November 1954 (aged 58–59) Grottaferrata, Italy
- Party: Balli Kombëtar
- Profession: Politician and lawyer

Koço Muka (1895 - 21 November 1954) was an Albanian politician, lawyer and Minister of Education in 1944.

== Biography ==
He was born in 1895 in Himara. He attended and graduated from the Zosimaia School in Ioannina and then studied law in Istanbul at Dar al-Huk. In 1916 he started working as a notary in Himara. He then became a military officer in the period 1920-1924 and even became the district commander of the Gjirokastër gendarmerie. After supporting the June Revolution, with the Triumfin e Legalitetit he left the country as an emigrant to Italy, Greece and Austria. In 1942 he became a quaestor in Gjirokastër, also holding the office of prefect. In August 1943 he quarreled with General Criminello and left along with the entire quaestorship. In 1944 he was appointed Minister of Education in the Mitrovica government. He left Albania with the coming to power of the communists. On June 1, 1945, the Prime Minister of Albania, Enver Hoxha, asked the President of the United States, Harry S. Truman, to hand over Koço Muka to the Albanian authorities for trial. He died in Grottaferrata, Italy on November 21, 1954.

== Legacy ==
A street in Paskuqan was named after him.
