= Andon Qesari =

Albanian actor (1942–2021)

- Born: 27 June 1942; Qeparo, Himarë, Albania
- Died: 13 February 2021 (aged 78)
- Occupation: Actor
- Awards: Merited Artist

Andon Qesari (27 June 1942 – 13 February 2021) was an Albanian actor and stage director. He made a handful of films as an actor, and was also known for his work in theater. The government of Albania declared him to be an Artist of Merit.

== Filmography ==
- Gadhnjim mbi vdekjen (1967)
- Gjurma (1970)
- Në fillim të verës (1975)
- Pylli i lirisë (1976)
- Ata ishin kater (1977)
- Dëshmorët e monumenteve (1980)
- Tela për violinë (1987)
- Në emër të lirisë (1987)
- Dashuria e fundit (1995)
