= St. Sergius' and St. Bacchus' Church, Himarë =

Cultural monument in Albania

St. Sergius' and St. Bacchus' Church
- Kisha e Sergjit dhe Bakut (Albanian)
- Location: Himarë

Cultural Monument of Albania

St. Sergius' and St. Bacchus' Church (Albanian: Kisha e Sergjit dhe Bakut) is an Albanian Orthodox church in Himarë, Vlorë County, Albania. It is a Cultural Monument of Albania.
