= Himarë =

Himarë Himara Χειμάρρα
- Municipality
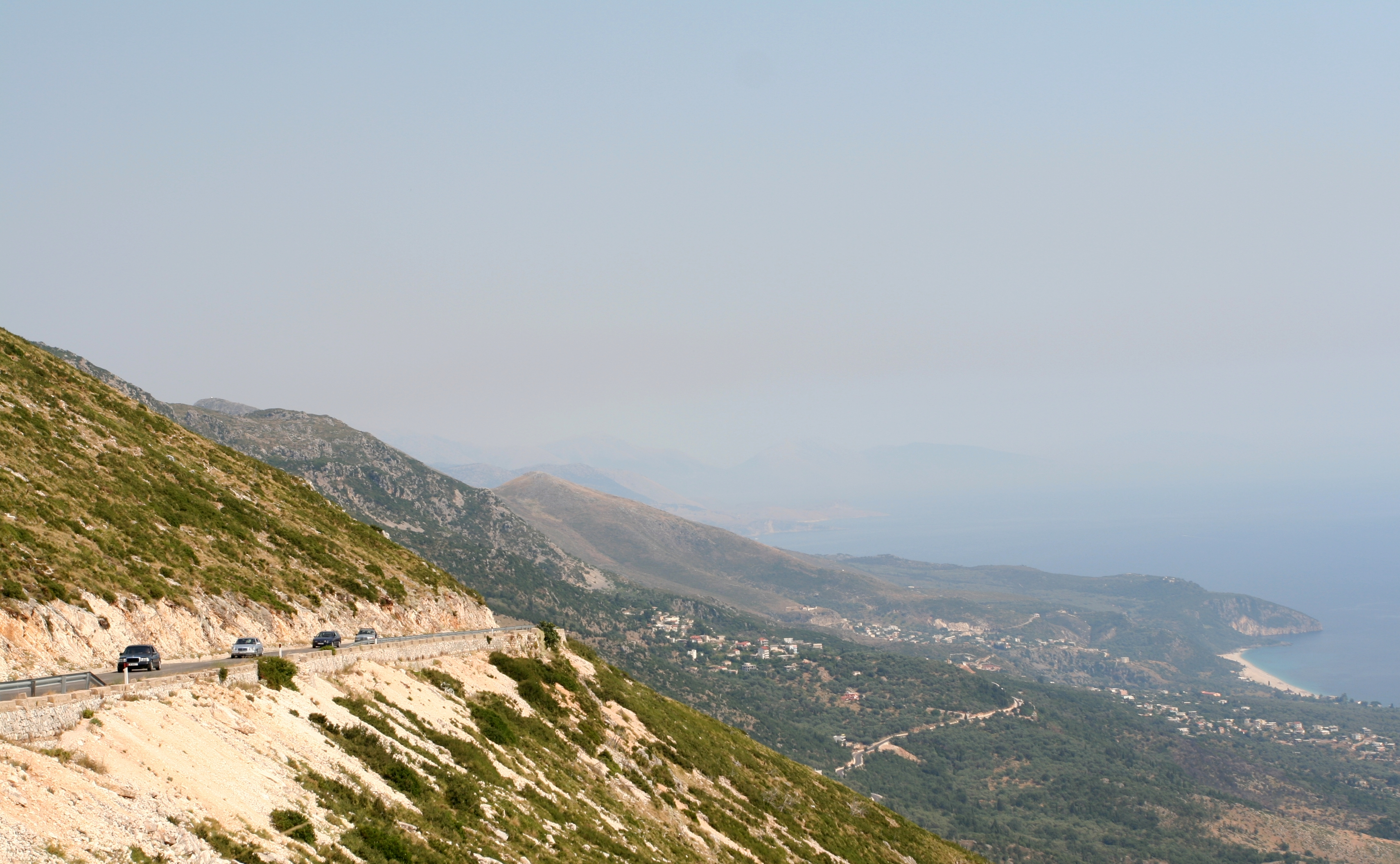
- The region of Himarë seen from the Ceraunian Mountains

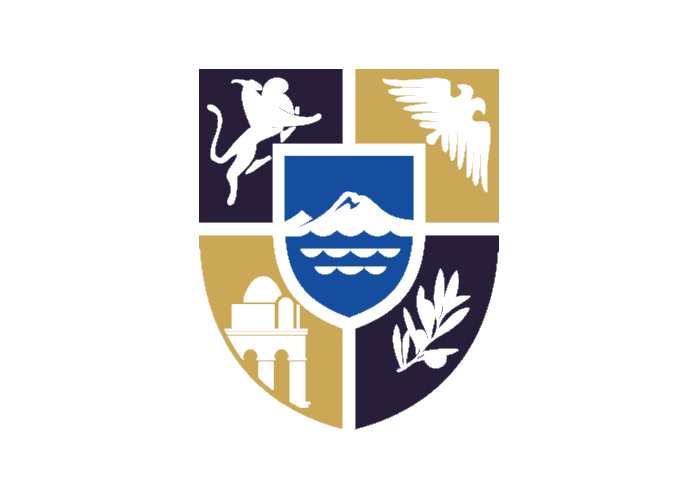
- Flag Emblem

- Location within Albania
- Coordinates: 40°7′N 19°44′E
- Country: Albania
- County: Vlorë

Government
  - Mayor: Vangjel Tavo (PS)

Area
  - Municipality: 571.94 km^{2} (220.83 sq mi)

Population (2011)
  - Municipality: 7,818
  - Municipality density: 13.67/km^{2} (35.40/sq mi)
  - Administrative unit: 2,822
- Demonym(s): Albanian: Himariot (m), Himariote (f)
- Time zone: UTC+1 (CET)
  - Summer (DST): UTC+2 (CEST)
- Postal Code: 9425
- Area Code: (0)393
- Website: himara.gov.al

Himarë (Albanian definite form: Himara; Greek: Χιμάρα, Chimara or Χειμάρρα, Cheimarra) is a municipality and region in Vlorë County, southern Albania. The municipality has a total area of 571.94 km^{2} (220.83 sq mi) and consists of the administrative units of Himarë, Horë-Vranisht and Lukovë. It lies between the Ceraunian Mountains and the Albanian Ionian Sea Coast and is part of the Albanian Riviera. The traditionally perceived borders of the Himarë region gradually shrank during the Ottoman period, being reduced to the town of Himarë and the villages of the coastline (Bregdet in Albanian), generally including only Palasë, Dhërmi, Pilur, Kudhës, Vuno, Iljas and Qeparo.

The coastal region of Himarë is predominantly populated by an ethnic Greek community. The local population is bilingual in Greek and Albanian. The town of Himarë and the villages of Dhërmi and Palasa, which together account for the bulk of the population of the region, are primarily populated by a Greek population. The villages of Iljas, Lukovë, Kudhës, Pilur and Vuno are inhabited by an Albanian population, while Qeparo is inhabited by both ethnic Albanians and Greeks. In the 2011 census, 83% of the inhabitants of the former municipality of Horë-Vranisht declared themselves as Albanians, while the rest failed to provide a reply. In the former Lukovë municipality, the population is predominantly Albanian (94%) with a small Greek minority (6%).

== Geography ==
The Himarë region is a strip approximately 20 km long by 5 km wide, covering a total of 132.13 km^{2}, and bounded by the 2000-metre-high Ceraunian mountains to the northeast and the Ionian Sea to the southwest. There are long pebbled beaches and the few hills close to the sea are terraced and planted with olive and citrus trees. The traditionally perceived borders of the Himarë region gradually shrank during the Ottoman period, being reduced only to the town of Himarë and the villages on the coastline (Bregdet in Albanian).

== History ==
=== Antiquity ===
In antiquity the region of Himarë was part of the territory of the Chaonians.

In antiquity the region was inhabited by the Greek tribe of the Chaonians. The Chaonians were one of the three principal Greek-speaking tribes of Epirus, along with the Thesprotians and the Molossians. The town of Himarë is believed to have been founded as Chimaira (Χίμαιρα) by the Chaonians as a trading outpost on the Chaonian shore. However, another theory suggests that it comes from Greek χείμαρρος (cheimarros), meaning "torrent". An oracular lamella from the Οracle of Dodona, dated to the first half of the 4th century BCE and written in the Doric Greek dialect, has the inscription "περὶ τᾶς οἰκήσιος τᾶς ἐγ Χεμαρίων πότερον αὐτεῖ οἰκέωντι;", which translates as "regarding the settlement by the inhabitants of Himarë, [they submit the question] should (or can) they settle here?".

In classical antiquity, Himarë was part of the Kingdom of Epirus under the rule of the Molossian Aeacid dynasty, which included King Pyrrhus of Epirus. When the region was conquered by the Roman Republic in the 2nd century BCE, its settlements were badly damaged and some were destroyed by the Roman General Aemilius Paulus.

=== Middle Ages ===
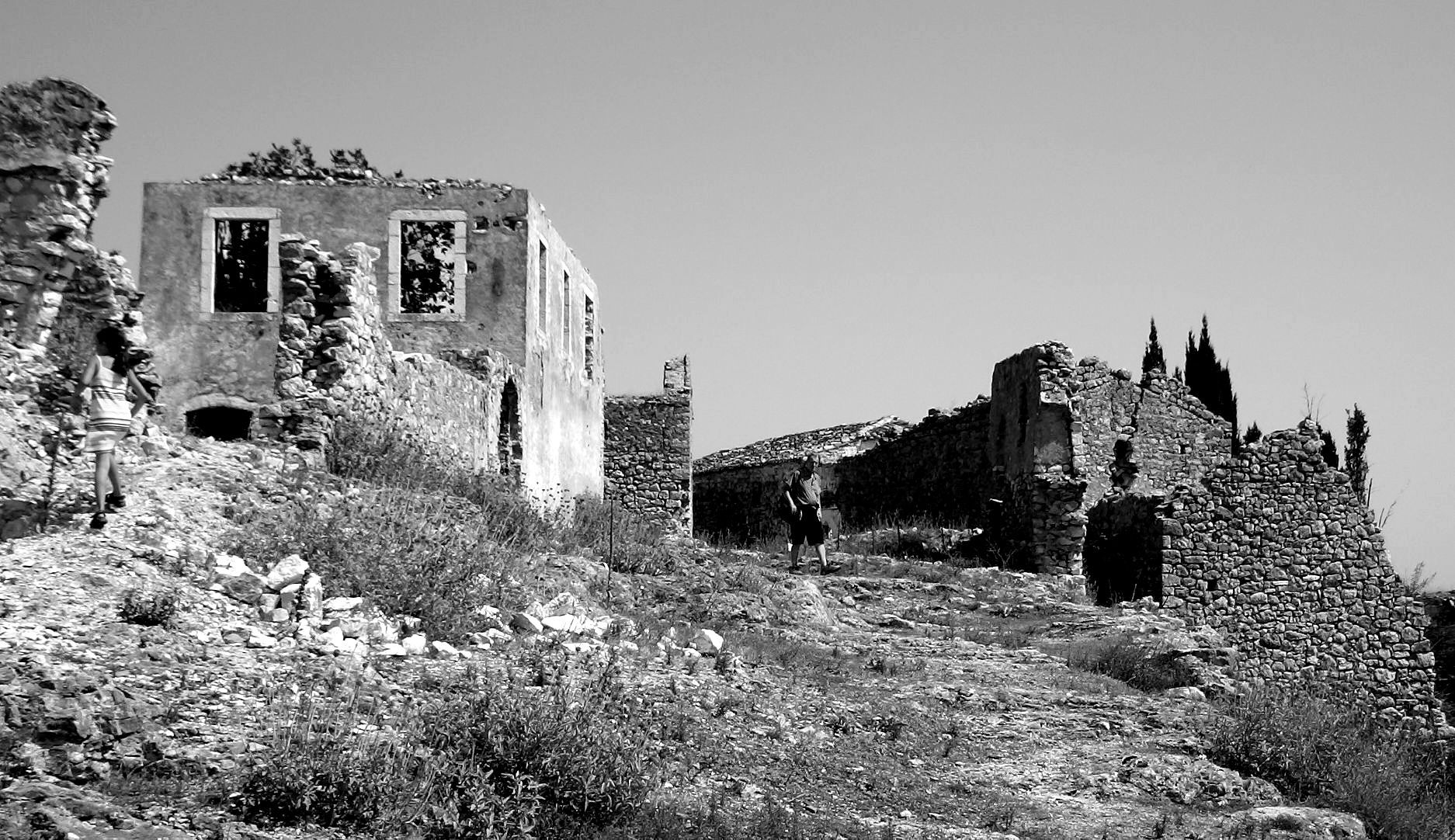
Ruins of the Himarë Fortress, locally known as 'Kastro' meaning castle

Himarë and the rest of the southern Balkans passed into the hands of the Byzantine Empire following the fall of Rome, but like the rest of the region it became the frequent target of various attackers including the Goths, Avars, Slavs, Bulgars, Saracens and Normans. Himarë is mentioned in Procopius of Caesarea's Buildings (544) as Chimaeriae, being part of Old Epirus and that a new fortress was built in its location. In 614, the Slavic tribe of the Baiounetai invaded the area and controlled a region from Himarë to Margariti called "Vagenetia".

A local diocese of Cheimara (Greek: Χειμάρα) was formed as noted in a Byzantine Taktikon of the late 10th century (972-976) under the jurisdiction of the Metropolitan bishopric of Nicopolis. It is unclear when Albanians and Himarë Greeks arrived in the Himarë region and when contacts between the two groups began. Nevertheless, contacts between them probably started in the 13th and 14th centuries. The use of the name "Chaonia" in reference to the region apparently died out during the 12th century, the last time it is recorded (in a Byzantine tax collection document). In 1278, Nicephorus of Epirus surrendered to the Angevins the ports of Himarë, Sopot and Butrint. As a result, Charles of Anjou controlled the Ionian coast from Himarë to Butrint. It must have returned to Byzantine rule in 1281 after the battle of Berat. In c. 1360 the Latin bishop of Chimara renounced his office and his Catholic faith and submitted to the Patriarch of Constantinople. Himarë was later ruled by Serbian Empire between 1342 and 1372. In 1372, Himarë, together with Vlora, Kanina and Berat region, was given as a dowry to Balsha II due to his marriage with Comita Muzaka, the daughter of Andrea II Muzaka. After the death of Balsha II, his widow and his daughter Rugjina Balsha (who married Mrkša Žarković) managed to keep possession of the region up to 1417 when the Ottomans captured Vlora. At the Battle of Kosovo of 1389, contemporary Greek authors list among participants Northern Albanians, those of Himarë, Epirus and the coast. Though in 14th century Byzantine control in Himarë was lost, the local bishop remained under the jurisdiction of the Orthodox Patriarchate of Constantinople.

=== Early Ottoman period ===
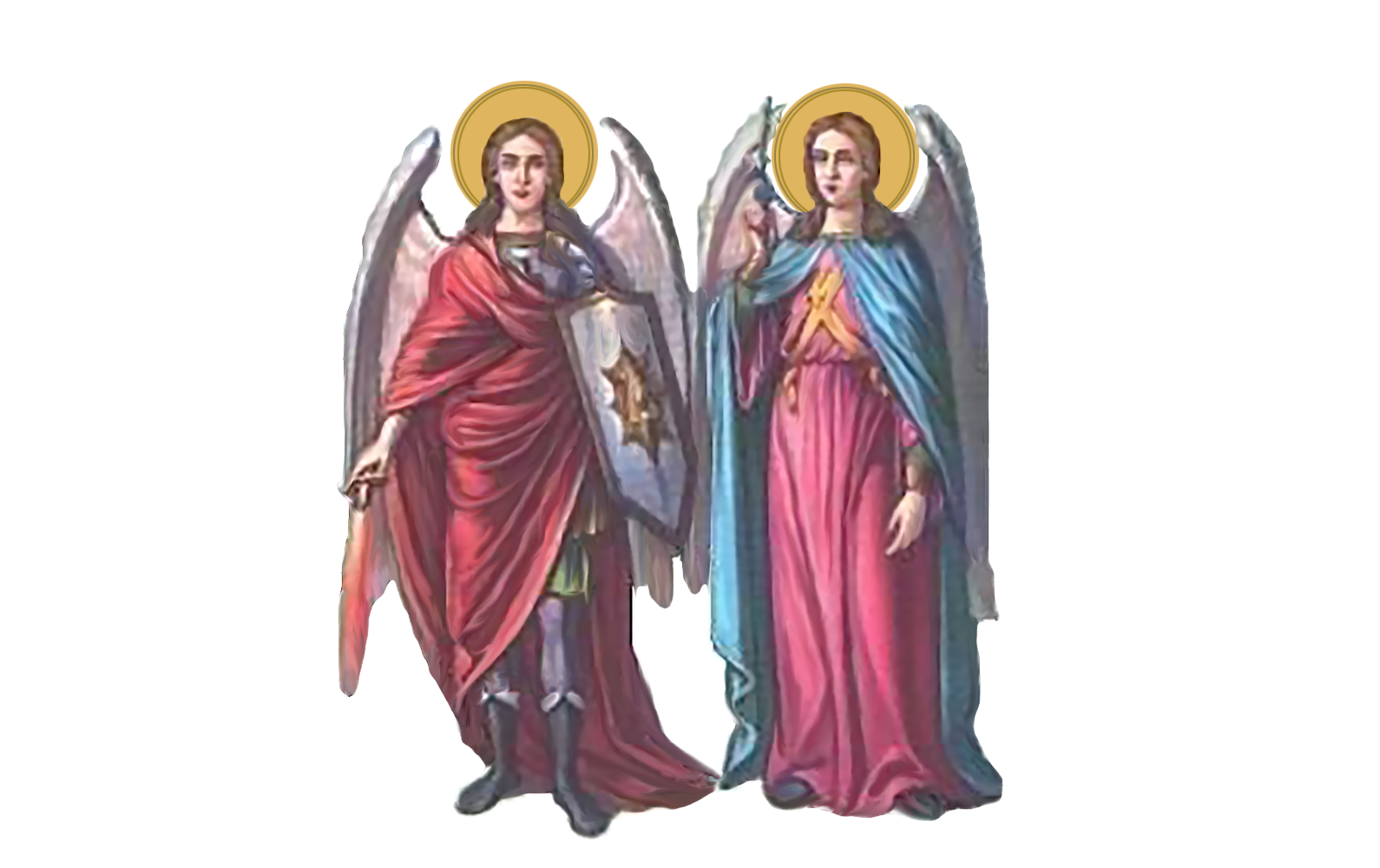
The flag of Himarë during the Ottoman era, depicting the Archangels Michael and Gabriel

In 1431 Himarë became a nahiye, an administrative division, of the Sanjak of Albania. It became a symbol of resistance to the Ottomans but suffered from an almost continuous state of warfare. Himariots participated in Skanderbeg's resistance against the Ottoman Empire. During Skanderbeg's rebellion and the rule of Gjergj Arianiti, Himarë was within the domains of the Principality of Arianiti between 1443 and 1462. In the summer of 1473 the chieftain John Vlasis, with a small unit from nearby Corfu and with native Himariot support, took control of the entire coastal region from Sagiada to Himarë, but when the ongoing Ottoman-Venetian war ended (1479) the region was again under Ottoman control. In 1481, one year after the Ottomans had landed in Otranto in southern Italy, the Himariots joined the forces of Gjon Kastrioti II (son of Skanderbeg) in his uprising against the Ottomans. The Albanian rebellion in Himarë was led by Konstantin Muzaka with aid from Krokodeilos Kladas. The uprising failed, but the Himariots rose up again in 1488, and between 1494 and 1509, destabilizing Ottoman control but failing to liberate their territory.

In 1501, Himarë was governed by its own elders, and the traditional meeting place of the region was in the locality of Spille, near the village of Qeparo; the region at this time consisted of 7 villages - Qeparo, Himarë, Vuno, Sopot (which was divided into two, Shën Vasija and Nivicë Bubari), Dhërmi, Palasë and Kudhës-Perivoli. Certain villages enjoyed more privileges than others, as they were provided with Kapedana - hereditary leaders with military roles, particularly regarding recruitment. The Spiromilio family were the hereditary holders of this position in Himarë, while the Gjika family held the title in Qeparo and the Kasneci family in Vuno. Sopot also had its own Kapedan but lost the privilege prior to the other three aforementioned villages, as was observed when Neapolitan documents relating to the king's recruitments in the region during the end of the 18th century only mentioned a lieutenant and future captain called Giovanni Spiro (Spiromilio), alongside a major by the name of Atanasio Gjika and a lieutenant called Costantino Kasneci, as well as multiple cadets. Apart from these Kapedana, the villages in the Himarë region did not have unique leaders, but rather a council made up of the heads of the local tribes or brotherhoods known as primates in relevant documents. The Albanians in southern Albania and northern Greece were not divided in fis like northern and central Albanians, but in fara or gjeri ("common thing"). Among the lineages was that of Himarë.

In 1532, Denis Possot, who travelled through the region, described Albania as divided into three parts: one ruled by the Ottomans, one ruled by the Venetians and the other ruled by the Albanians themselves. He included the Himarë region, which still included all of Labëria, among those ruled by the Albanians. He added that it could field 20,000 warriors against the Ottomans.

The Ottoman Sultan Suleiman the Magnificent personally mounted an expedition in 1537 that destroyed or captured many surrounding villages but did not manage to subdue the area. The Ottomans found it necessary to compromise with the inhabitants by giving them a series of privileges: local self-government, the right to bear arms, exemption from taxes, the right to sail under their own flag into any Ottoman port and to provide military service in time of war. However, despite the privileges, the Himariots revolted during the following conflicts: Ottoman–Venetian War (1537–40), Albanian revolt of 1566–1571, Ottoman–Venetian War (1570–73), Morean War (1684–99), Ottoman–Venetian War (1714–18) and the Russo-Turkish wars of the 18th century. On the other hand, Ottoman reprisals depopulated the area and led to forced Islamizations which finally limited the area's Christian population by the 18th century to the town of Himarë and six villages. In 1567, Himariots are counted among Albanians that could be rallied against the Ottoman, as they, together with other Albanians, had caused great damage to the Ottomans since 1537.

In one occasion, in 1577, the villages of the bishopric of Himarë appealed to the Pope for arms and supplies promising to fight the Ottomans. They also promised to transfer their religious allegiance to Rome, provided that they would retain their Eastern Orthodox liturgical customs; the letter concludes with "From Himarra, i.e. Epiros of the Arvanids [Albanians], on July 12th 1577". The term "Albanian" was used by the Himariots, both as an identifier of local Himariotes, and as an identifier of "otherness" (as for example in letters from 1532 and 1578), which has led some to suggest that it indicated that Himariots consisted of both Albanians and non-Albanians. In various letters to European rulers the Himariots claimed that they were once ruled by leaders such as Alexander the Great, Pyrrhus of Epirus and Skanderbeg, personalities with which the Himariotes formed identitarian historical memory; as they later did with the figure of Spyros Spyromilios. The most cited figure with which the Himariots proud themselves through their past is Skanderbeg. The Himarë region was one example where Christian Albanians during the Ottoman period could carry arms and have a rather independent life. In the second half of the 16th century, Himarë was one of the cities of southern Albania that maintained the pre-Ottoman Christian character. It did not have a single Muslim family. By the end of the century, an Italian author states that the Himariots are peoples of Albania who speak Albanian and adhere to the Greek Orthodox rite.

The Ottomans managed to register the population for taxation purposes in 1583. Kristo Frashëri describes the list as having predominantly Albanian anthroponymy. The town of Himarë had 130 households and 7 orphans, where the most common names and surnames were Dhima/Dhimo, Gjon, Kont/Kond, Gjin, Gjoka; the village of Dhërmi had 50 households and 3 orphans, where most common anthroponyms were Gjin, Dhima/Dhimo, Kond, Todor; the village of Palasë had 95 households, where the most common anthroponyms were Dhima/Dhimo, Jorgo, Pali, Andrea, Nika/Niko. Oliver J. Schmitt notes that in the 16th century Ottoman registers the anthroponyms of Himarë includes not only Albanian, Greek, Orthodox but also Slavic baptismal names.

Albanians organized an uprising again in the region of Himarë on 1596 against the Ottoman Empire.

During the Ottoman period, the people of Himarë established close links to the Italian city states, especially Naples and the powerful Republic of Venice, which controlled Corfu and the other Ionian Islands, and later with Austro-Hungary. In 1743, Albanian families from Piqeras, Lukovë, Klikursi, Shën Vasil and Nivica-Bubar migrated to Italy and founded the village Villa Badessa in Abruzzo, where the Arbëreshë dialect is still spoken. After the death of Skanderbeg, successive waves of Albanians from regions such as Himarë moved to Italy, and often settled in depopulated places; they are known as Arbëreshë.

The first school in the region opened in 1627, where lessons were held in the Greek language. The following years (until 1633) Greek-language schools opened also in the villages of Dhërmi and Palasa. During the Ottoman period, judicial authority in Himarë and the surrounding villages was exercised by community courts also known as "councils of elders", that consisted exclusively of laymen. Their decisions was subject to the sanction of the local Orthodox bishop who belonged to the metropolis of Ioannina. In 1632 Albanian schools were founded in Himarë by Neophytos Rodinos.

In 1661, both the Muslims and the Christians of the region had joined in rebellion against the Ottomans. In 1720, the villages of Himarë, Palasa, Ilias, Vuno, Pilur and Qeparo refused to submit to the Pasha of Delvina. In 1759–1760, local leaders sent three letters to the government of the Russian Empire, stating that the population of Himarë was Orthodox Christian, Albanian-speaking (with the educated speaking Greek and the nobility Italian) and willing to join an anti-Ottoman uprising, provided the Russians would support a liberation movement of the Greece. The Himariots did revolt in 1767, laying siege to Delvinë and Vlorë, but were eventually defeated by Ottoman reinforcements from nearby regions. This defeat resulted in large numbers fleeing to Apulia and Corfu, where many were recruited as Albanian contingents for the Russian fleet.

The Italian missionary Giuseppe Schiro, who visited the region, wrote during the same period (1722) that the settlements of Himarë (town), Dhërmi, and Palasë were ethnically Greek, while the rest ethnically Albanian. They all wrote in the Greek dialect of the region in their "in-group" communication, mixed with Albanian, Turkish, Italian and some Arabic words. They used Greek in their correspondence with the Pope and other representatives of western countries, as well as with the Russian Empire. When they communicated in Italian, they used a translator, but signed in Greek, with Greek conferments of their names. Their preference of writing in Greek was conscious and not imposed by any conditions or a secretariat. At that time (1730-1750) after extensive Islamization the term "Albanians" in local literature referred to the inhabitants of nearby Kurvelesh province, or as an identifier of the Islamized Himariots located in the same province, who were portrayed as adversaries of Himarë.

=== Late Ottoman period ===
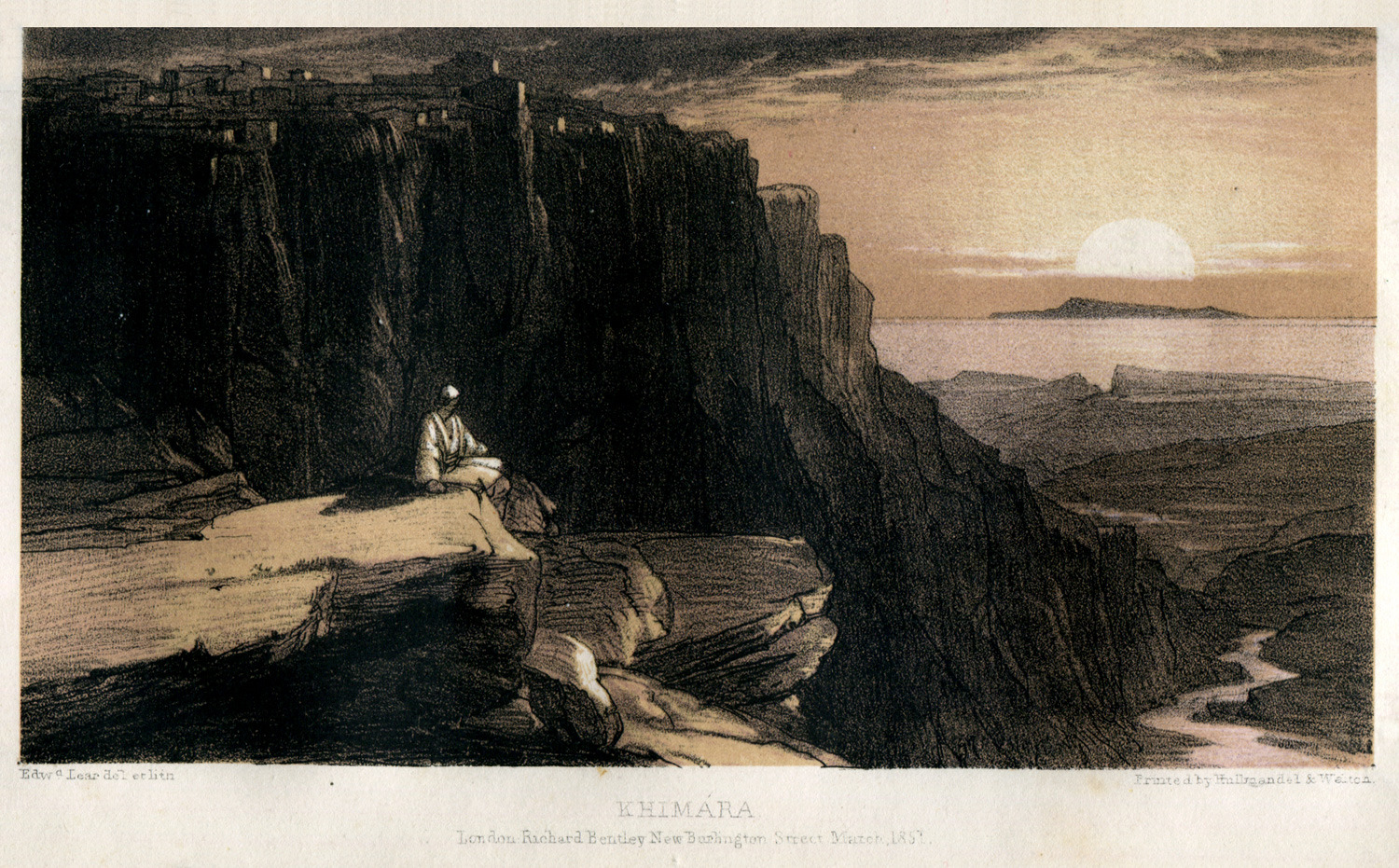
Sunset on the coast of Himarë depicted by Edward Lear, 24 October 1848.

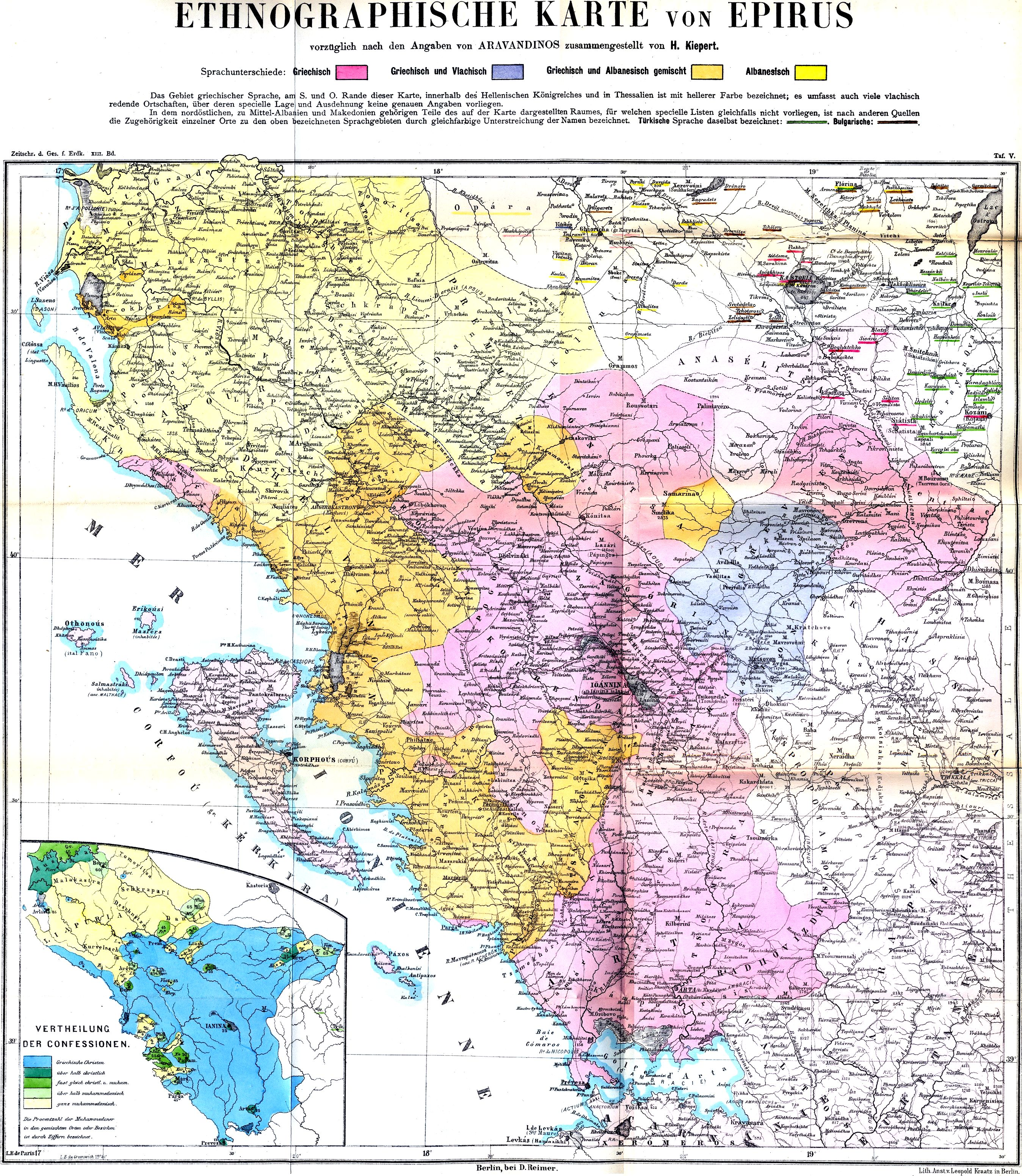
Ethnographic map based on the work of P. Aravandinos of the Epirus region from 1878

The Orthodox-Albanian communities of the Himariots and Souliotes were often in conflict with Ali Pasha of Yanina. In 1797, Ali Pasha, the Muslim Albanian ruler of the de facto independent Pashalik of Yanina, led a raid on the town of Himarë because they supported his enemy, the Souliotes, and more than 6,000 civilians were slaughtered. Two years later, Ali Pasha tried to create good relations with the Himariots after declaring their enclave part of his emerging semi-independent state, by financing various public works and churches. A church he built near Himarë, opposite of the Porto Palermo (Panormos) Castle is the largest and most magnificent in the region and still stands today as a major tourist attraction. Ali Pasha's rule over Himarë lasted about 20 years until it was abruptly terminated by his murder at the hands of the Ottoman agents. Himarë subsequently reverted to its status quo ante of an enclave surrounded by Ottoman territory. To emphasize the region's special status, the terms that the Himariots had reached with Suleiman the Magnificent were inscribed on bronze tablets at the request of their leaders, who wanted to record the agreement on a durable medium. These tablets are preserved to this day in the Topkapi palace museum in Istanbul.

The most famous military corps of the Kingdom of Naples that consisted of Greeks, the Reggimento Real Macedone was initially formed (1735) by Himariots, but after 1739 accepted also Greek fighters from different areas. At the turn of the 18th century various Himariot Albanian captains had their own military troops in the Kingdom of Naples, and they occasionally returned to their homeland in order to recruit new military troops. During the period of Ali Pasha's rule in the late 18th century Dimo Staphanopoli, a Corsican Greek of the French army, was particularly active in spreading revolutionary ideas and was found in areas receptive to the concept of Greek liberation, such as Himarë.

When the Greek War of Independence (1821–1830) broke out, the people of Himarë rose in revolt. The local uprising failed, but many Himariots, veterans of the Russian and French Army, joined the revolutionary forces in today southern Greece, where they played a significant role in the struggle. Many Himariots also joined the revolutionary movement in Greece via Greek commities formed in the Ionian Islands. In 1854, during the Crimean War, a major local rebellion broke out, with Himarë being one of the first towns that joined it. Although the newly founded Greek state tried tacitly to support it, the rebellion was suppressed by Ottoman forces after a few months. The Himariots were continuously held suspicious of supporting the expansionist plans of Greece in the region, especially during the era of the Albanian national awakening.

The leader of Albanian independence, Eqrem Vlora, wrote at the turn of the 19th century that among Himariots there were only 3,000 who had always been Greek-speaking. According to him, they were of a single Greek line of descent, regardless how old it was.

Himara became the most notable centre of the 'Epirote Society' created in 1906 under Spyros Spyromilios that sought the establishment of a network between the Greek state and the Orthodox communities of Epirus.

In 1913, the French journalist Rene Puaux was impressed by the strong Greek feeling of the Himariots.

During the last year of Ottoman rule in Albania, a demographic census conducted in the Kaza of Himara, showed that it was inhabited by 12,000 people.

=== Modern ===
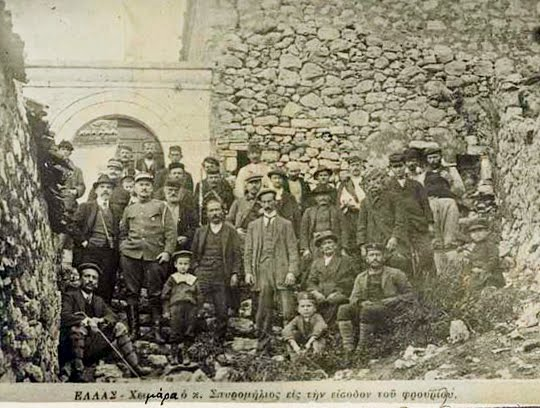
Spyros Spyromilios in the entrance of the castle (locally called Kastro) of Himarë

During the First Balkan War, on 18 November 1912, the town revolted under the Greek Gendarmerie officer and Himarë native Spyros Spyromilios and expelled the Ottoman forces in order to join Greece. In March 1914, the "Protocol of Corfu" was signed, which established the Autonomous Republic of Northern Epirus, of which Himarë formed a part, though the Autonomous Republic itself formally remained part of the newly formed Albanian state. However, in the Panepirotic assembly in Delvinë, that aimed at the ratifications of the terms of the Protocol by the Northern Epirote representatives, the delegates of Himarë abstained, insisting that only union with Greece would be a viable solution.

During the First World War, Himarë was under Greek administration (October 1914-September 1916) and then occupied by Italy. The Italians used Austro-Hungarian prisoners of war to build a road running through Himarë, which greatly reduced the region's isolation. Spiro Jorgo Koleka, a native of Vuno and a local leader of the Albanian national movement, opposed the annexation by foreign powers of Himarë area and the wider region around Vlora. To that effect Koleka was an organiser of the Vlora War, where other local Himariots participated. In 1921 the region came under the control of the Albanian state. The Himarë question in 1921, regarding the rights of "Himariots" and their villages Dhërmi, Vuno, Himarë, Piluri, Kudhës and Qeparo, was supervised by Albanian government representative Spiro Jorgo Koleka. The government concluded that Albanian was obligatory in school, as the official language, while Greek was free to be taught as a second language, as desired by the people. The locals rose in revolt, in 1924, protesting against a series of measures aiming at Albanisation, and demanding the same privileges they enjoyed prior to incorporation to Albania. Other uprisings followed in 1927 and 1932, both suppressed by the government of king Zog of Albania.

Later, Himarë was again occupied by the Italians as part of the Italian invasion in Albania. During the Greco-Italian War, the 3rd Infantry Division of the Greek Army entered Himarë, on 22 December 1940, after victorious fighting against the Fascist Italian forces deployed in the region. The town briefly came under Greek control until the German invasion in 1941.

In 2015 the government merged Himarë with the municipalities Horë-Vranisht and Lukovë. The seat of the municipality is the town Himarë.

== Demographics ==
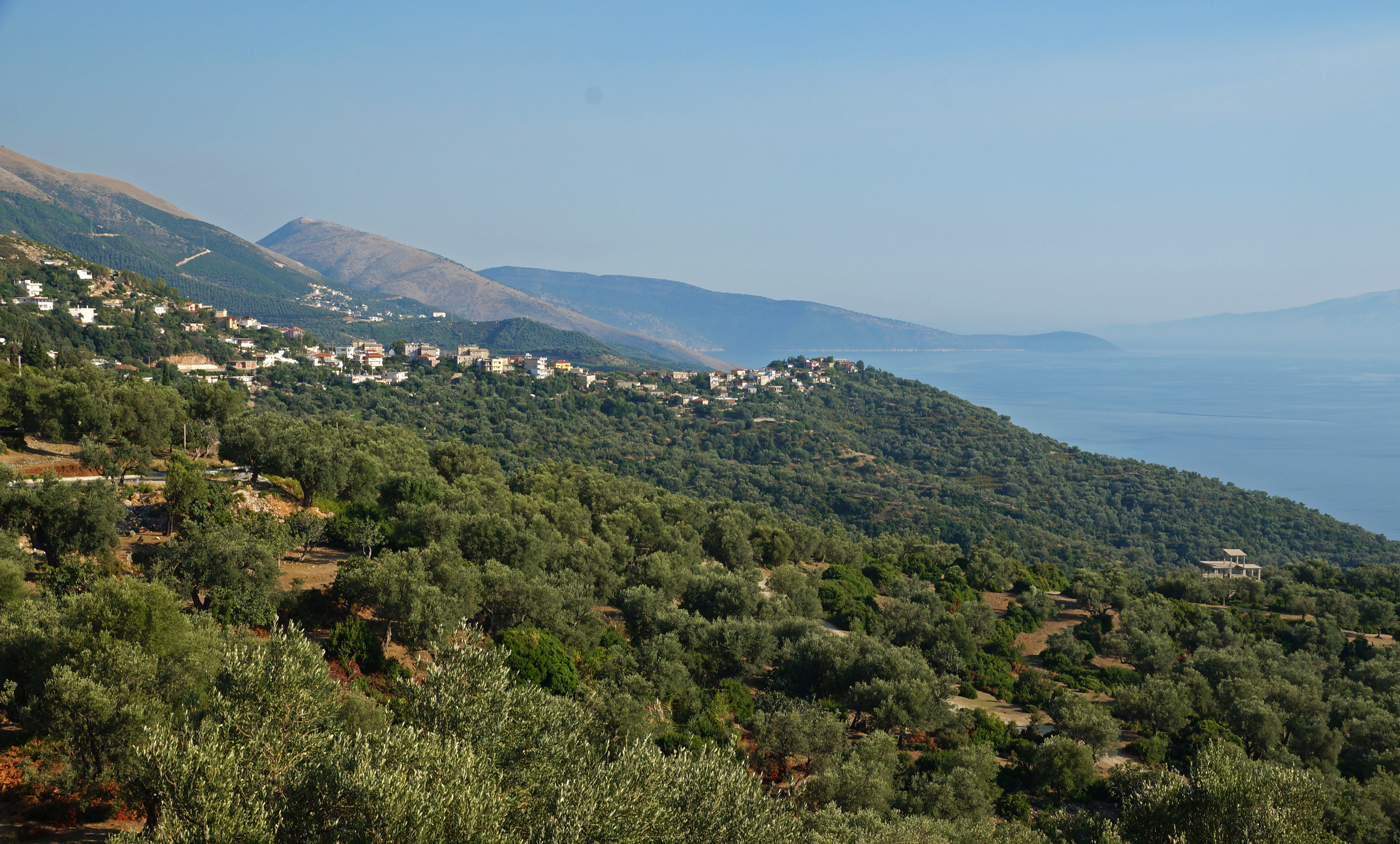
The village of Piqeras and the Albanian Riviera

Himarë is composed of three former municipalities which now serve as administrative divisions of the post-2011 municipality: Himarë, Vranisht and Lukovë. In the 2011 census, the three - then independent municipalities - had a total combined population of ~7,800. Lukovë had 2,916 permanent inhabitants, Himarë 2,822 and Vranisht 2,080. Comparatively, the 2015 Albanian Civil Registry offices, which list all Albanian citizens including those who live abroad, put the population of the municipality at 27,049 people. The Himarë municipality has the second lowest population density in Albania after Dropull. The majority of the population has left to live in Greece or large cities in Albania.

=== Himarë ===
The population of the former Himarë municipality was 2,822 in the 2011 census. 60.38% declared themselves as Albanians, 24.56% as Greeks and 14.00% preferred not to declare any ethnicity at all. 70.5% of the population declared themselves Christian Orthodox, 16.6% as Muslims, 2.7% as Catholics and ~10% declared no religious affiliation. The census results were disputed and affected by a boycott by part of the Greek minority, Mangalakova (2004) describes the ethnic composition of the territory of the former municipality of Himarë as predominantly Greek. Karl Kaser states that the Greek population comprised a majority or at least an important part of the population of Himarë. According to Martin Urban (1938) only three out of eight villages in Himarë were inhabited by a population of Albanian origin (Pilur, Vuno, Kudhes) with the rest being of Greek. From 1989 to 2011, about 3/4 of its population, left the Himarë region.

Today the town of Himarë and the settlements of Dhërmi and Palasë, which account for the bulk of the region's population, are inhabited by Greeks, while Pilur, Kudhës, Vuno and Ilias are populated by an Orthodox Albanian population. The village of Qeparo is inhabited by both Greeks (upper neighbourhood) and an Orthodox Albanian population (lower neighbourhood).

In the early 19th century according to Greek scholar and secretary to Ali Pasha Athanasios Psalidas, three villages of the area were considered Greek, while he also stated that there were also some Orthodox Albanian villages in the region. In general, the allegiances of the locals were in a narrow sense to their respective clans (the "phatriae") and areas, and in a broader sense to their Orthodox religion and cultural heritage. The later factors indicate closer links with their Greek co-religionists than to the Muslim Albanian communities.

=== Vranisht ===
Vranisht had a total resident population of 2,080 in the 2011 census. 83% declared themselves as Albanians and the rest didn't provide a reply. More than 75% of the population declared no religion, while 22.6% are Muslims. Vranisht is largely part of the region of Kurvelesh.

=== Lukovë ===
Lukovë had a total resident population of 2,916 in the 2011 census. 55.8% declared themselves as Albanians, 7.3% as Greeks and the rest didn't provide a reply. ~37% are Muslims, 30.9% are Christian Orthodox, 3.40% are Catholics, 0.6% Bektashi and the rest of the population declared no religious affiliation. In a demographic investigation by Leonidas Kallivretakis in the late 20th century, the population of Lukovë commune and all its villages, 54% were Albanian Christians, 40% were Albanian Muslims and 6% were Greek Christians.

=== Religion ===
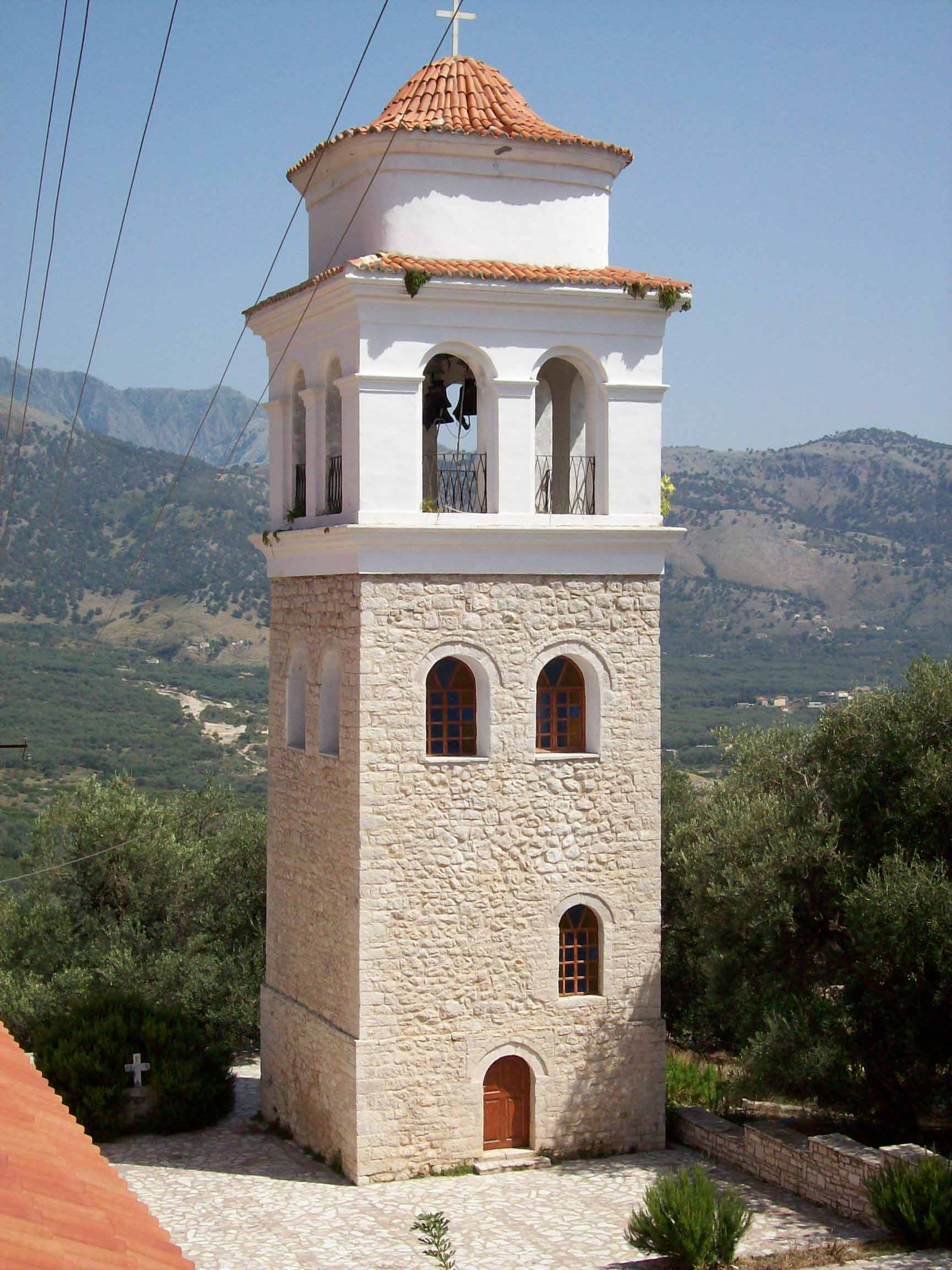
Bell tower of the Orthodox Church

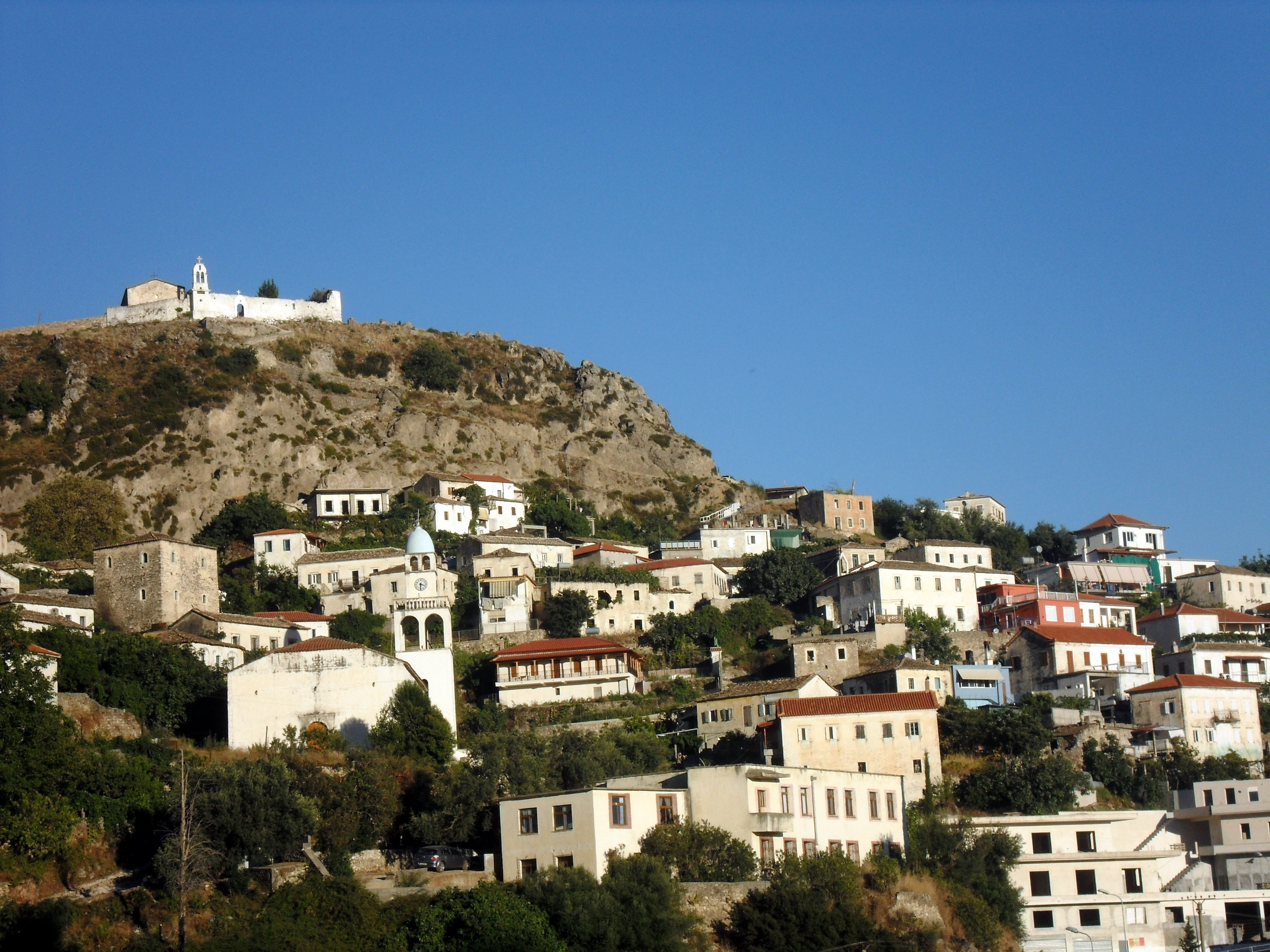
Part of the Dhërmi village with two Orthodox church buildings visible

The inhabitants of Himarë are predominantly Orthodox Christians. In 1577, 38 chieftains of the Himarë region appealed to Pope Gregory XIII for arms and supplies against the Ottomans. They promised to switch allegiance from the Orthodox to the Roman Catholic Church, and recognize Philip II of Spain as their sovereign. They asked to retain their Orthodox liturgical customs 'since the majority of the population is Greek and does not understand the Frankish language'. From 1577 to 1765 the population accepted the Pope as the religious head of the community and identified with the Roman Catholic Church. The success of the Roman Catholic missionaries among the Eastern-rite Albanians in Himarë led to the region becoming a refuge for Orthodox prelates that had converted. Himariotes thus largely adhered to Christian faith, although individual conversions to Islam were recorded from the early 16th century. One of them, Ajaz Pasha, became Grand Vizier and was sent by the Ottoman Sultan to put down the 1537 revolt of Himariotes. Even so, crypto-Christianity appeared, particularly in the villages of Fterre, Corraj, and Vuno. Under the request of Himariots to the Pope of Rome, a Basilian mission to Albania took place. Among the missionaries were Nico Catalano and monk Filoteo Zassi, an Arbëreshë. They departed by the end of January 1693 and first stayed in Dhërmi, where they found a deteriorated spiritual state with pressures from the Ottomans and the Greek Orthodox bishops. As noted by Catalano they: "were making of God's house a house of traffic, of affairs and of sacrilegious trade". He opened a school in the Himarë region, raised in the village of Dhërmi, where more than eighty students, both Christian and Muslim, were registered from the adjacent villages. Apart from preaching Catalano also taught new farming techniques and other professions to locals. He was particularly careful in teaching and preaching in the Albanian language, since he considered it to be the most effective method to counter the diffusion of Islam.

In August 2015 Albanian police demolished the renovated Orthodox church of Saint Athanasius in Dhermi, as local authorities weeks earlier declared it an "illegal construction". The Orthodox Autocephalous Church of Albania declared it a vandalistic act of desecration and a violation of church property and it also triggered diplomatic protests from Greece. This is the second demolition of the church, the first having taken place during the era of the People's Republic of Albania, but at the time the church was rebuilt by the local Orthodox Church after the restoration of Democracy in the country (1991). The Albanian government has promised to rebuild the church after archaeological excavations have taken place. The demolition of the religious monument also triggered strong reactions from the European Commission.

=== Language ===
==== Himariote dialect of Greek ====
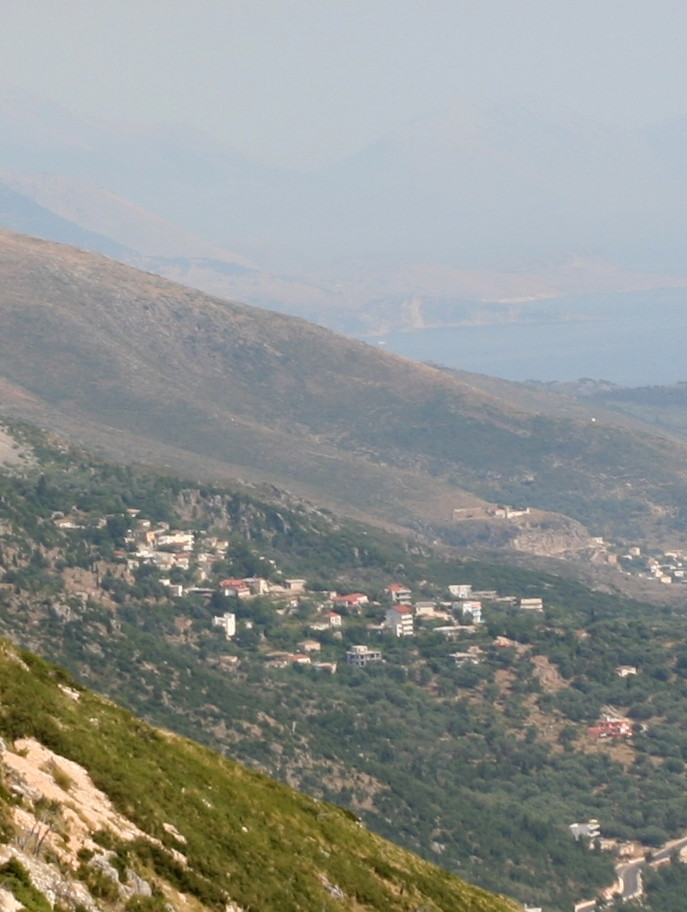
View of the village of Palasë. Its inhabitants speak mainly the Himariote Greek dialect.

On the other hand, the vast majority of people in Himarë, who call themselves "Horiani" (Greek: Χωριανοί), meaning locals in the local Greek dialect, are bilingual in both Albanian and Greek. In the town of Himarë as well as in nearby villages of Dhërmi and Palasa mainly speak a unique local Greek dialect that preserves many archaic features no longer found in standard Modern Greek. This dialect has small variations in the way it is spoken in every town, especially in the accent. Elements of Slavic influence are limited compared to the neighboring Albanian idioms, as well as the other variants of the Greek language spoken in southeast Albania and Nartë region. Greek schools were operating until the 1920s. During the struggle for the re-establishment of Greek education in the area (1934-1936) even the Albanian-speaking villages asked for the reopening of Greek schools, however their demand was rejected by the Albanian government. In the spring of 2006, a private Greek-language school opened in the town of Himarë, at the precise location where the Orthodox missionary Cosmas the Aetolian founded the Acroceraunian School in 1770.

Among those who identify as Greeks in Himarë there is near equal proficiency with Albanian. This may be explained by mixed marriages with Albanian elements on the part of the ancestors of the Himarë Greeks, and as the result of the Hellenization of the local Albanian population via policies encouraged by the Greek Orthodox Church up until the time of Albania's founding, accentuated by the differences in cultural norms among Christians and Muslims. Albanian is the state language, while Greek is the language of high culture, religion, and the state language of an economically powerful neighbor where many Himariotes now earn their living. The Greek language went through a difficult period between 1946 and 1990, when the Greek population of Himarë could not study in its native language, religion was prohibited, and relations with Greece were severed.

==== Himariot subdialect of Lab Albanian ====
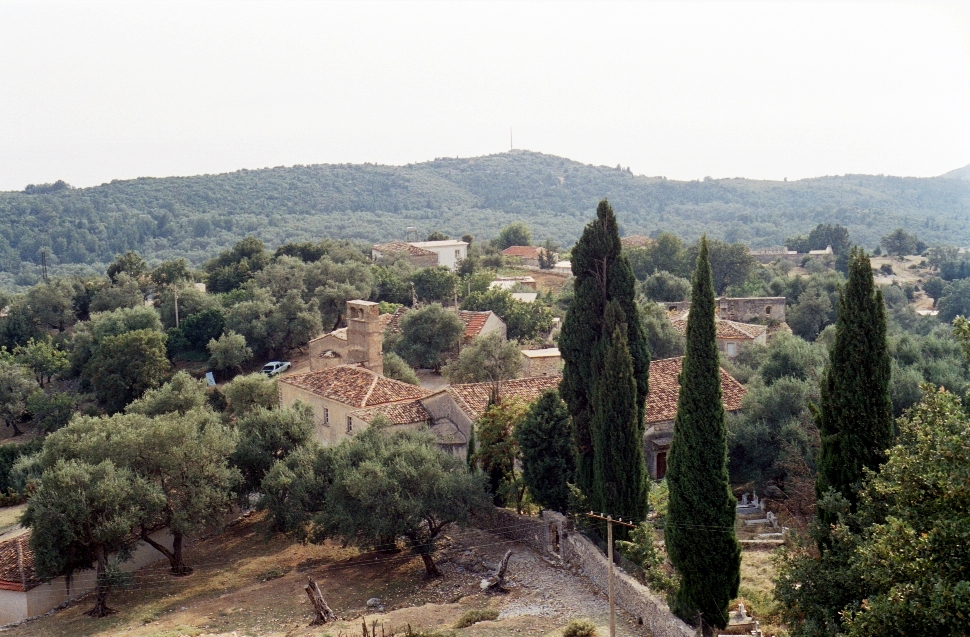
The village of Vuno. Its population speak the Lab dialect of Tosk Albanian.

The surrounding towns of Ilias, Vuno, Qeparo, Kudhës and Pilur mainly speak the Lab Albanian dialect, a subdialect of Tosk Albanian. A conservative phonological trait of Lab is the lack of palatalization, making residents speak "shkjip", not "shqip" (as in Arbëresh). The purported discovery of nasal vowels in the Himarë region and the neighboring Kurvelesh region challenged the traditional view that the split between Gheg and Tosk was in part caused by the phenomenon of nasalization; Elements of Slavic influence in the lexicon are also evident in the local Albanian idiom.

== Politics ==
Jorgo Goro backed by an electoral alliance led by the Socialist Party of Albania is the mayor of Himarë since 2011 when he defeated Vasil Bollano (PBDNJ). Bollano had won the 2007 local elections. He won 49.16% of the total vote, Dhimitri Llazari backed by a PD-led coalition 27.62%, Aleks Tato (PS-led coalition) 20.15% and Kosta Andruco 3.07%. At that time, the possibility of victory by the Greek minority Unity for Human Rights Party in the municipal elections in the past triggered nationalist rhetoric, both at the local and even national level, and heightened tensions in the town. During his tenure, Bollano and his aides were accused of handing building permits on their property by locals of Himarë. Since then he has been charged with abuse of power and falsification of administrative documents related to illegal building permits in the coastal area. He has called his legal issues "politically motivated". His political narrative at the time have been described as " inflammatory nationalist rhetoric to galvanize his power base". In the 2011 elections, a PS-backed coalition fielded Jorgo against him. Goro won 41.97% of the total vote, Bollano 39.25%, Savo Prifti (backed by the right-wing Democratic Party of Albania) 14.93%, Dhimitri Llazari (backed by MEGA, another Greek community party) 3.84%. The PS-backed alliance won 7 councillor seats, PBDNJ in coalition with MEGA won 6 seats and the DP-led alliance 4 seats. In the 2013 governmental elections, the region of Himarë voted 48.3% for the Socialist Party and 25.5% for the Unity of Human Rights party. In the 2015, the elections were held under the new administrative division which includes Himarë, Vranisht and Lukovë. Goro won with 55.6% (14 councillors) of the total vote, Dhionisios Alfred Beleri (PBDNJ) 27.34% (4 councillors), Vladimir Kumi (independent candidate) 10.08%, Lefteri Prifti (backed by PD) 6.98% (3 councillors). In 2019, PD backed by PBDNJ and other smaller parties abstained from the elections. Goro was re-elected without opposition and PS 63.79% of the total vote for councillor seats, while former mayor Bollano who ran as an independent candidate for a seat in the municipal council got 64 votes in total and wasn't elected.

In the local elections of May 15, 2023, Greek minority candidate Dhionisios Alfred Beleri won by a slender margin. Beleri got arrested two days earlier on charges of vote-buying raising diplomatic tensions between Albania and Greece. Beleri's appeal in the middle of June 2023 to have his pre-trial detention lifted was rejected. This turn provoked reactions from the Greek Foreign Ministry.

In March 2024, Himara's acting mayor Jorgo Goro was arrested, along with four others, on charges of corruption and abuse of office by order of the Special Anti-Corruption Structure, following accusations made by Beleri. His criminal activities are connected with Artan Gaçi, the husband of the former Minister of Foreign Affairs, Olta Xhaçka. Following Goro's arrest and resignation, Blerina Bala was elected as caretaker mayor by the Himara council amid protests at the municipality building in support of the jailed Beleri, who is currently challenging his conviction for electoral fraud. Bala will remain in office as caretaker for as long as is needed to hold new elections in the municipality, which will be possible after the final court decision in Beleri's case.

=== Minority issues ===
While the situation of the Greek minority in Albania has improved since the fall of communism, ethnic tensions in Himarë remain. During the 1994 trial of the Omonoia members, an organization that represents the Greek minority in Albania, three local Greeks were arrested and beaten by the Albanian police after they were found in possession of leaflets calling for the release of the arrested Omonoia leaders. In 2008, a number of protests took place with the locals demanding land ownership and autonomy for the region. The house of former mayor of Himarë, Vasil Bollano, has been the target of a bomb attack twice, in 2004 and again in May 2010. In 2009 the ethnic Greek mayor of Himarë ordered the removal of several road signs because they were not written in Greek, but only in Albanian and English. A local court convicted him for the destruction of government property but his conviction was overturned.

On 12 August 2010, ethnic tensions soared after the ethnic Greek shopkeeper Aristotelis Goumas was killed when his motorcycle was hit by a car driven by three Albanian youths with whom Goumas allegedly had an altercation when they demanded that he must not speak Greek to them in his store. Outraged locals blocked the main highway between Vlore and Saranda and demanded reform and increased local Himariote representation in the local police force. The incident was condemned by both the Greek and Albanian governments, and three suspects were charged for the incident.

The census of 2011 included ethnicity for the first time, a long-standing demand of the Greek minority in Albania and of international organizations. However, Greek minority representatives found unacceptable article 20 of the Census law, according to which there is a $1,000 fine for declaring an ethnicity other than what was written down on someone's birth certificate. As a result, the census was boycotted by parts of the Greek community.

In 2005, after years of unanswered demands, Prime Minister Berisha authorized the opening of a Greek-language school in Himarë partially funded by the Greek government.

On 26 August 2015, Albanian government demolished the church of St. Athanasios at Dhërmi. The Greek Ministry of Foreign Affairs condemned this action. In October 2017 the Albanian authorities proceeded with the demolition of properties belonging to Greek minority members. Due to this development the local inhabitants publicly protested while a large number of Albanian policemen were dispatched to Himarë.

In March 2019 the Albanian authorities withdrew a former decision for the seizure of properties belonging to members of the local Greek minority. According to diplomatic sources, this decision came as a result of stern warning by Greek Prime Minister Alexis Tsipras. Moreover, Omonoia appealed to Greece to defend the legal rights of the local Greek population and to avoid seizure of their properties.

== Attractions ==
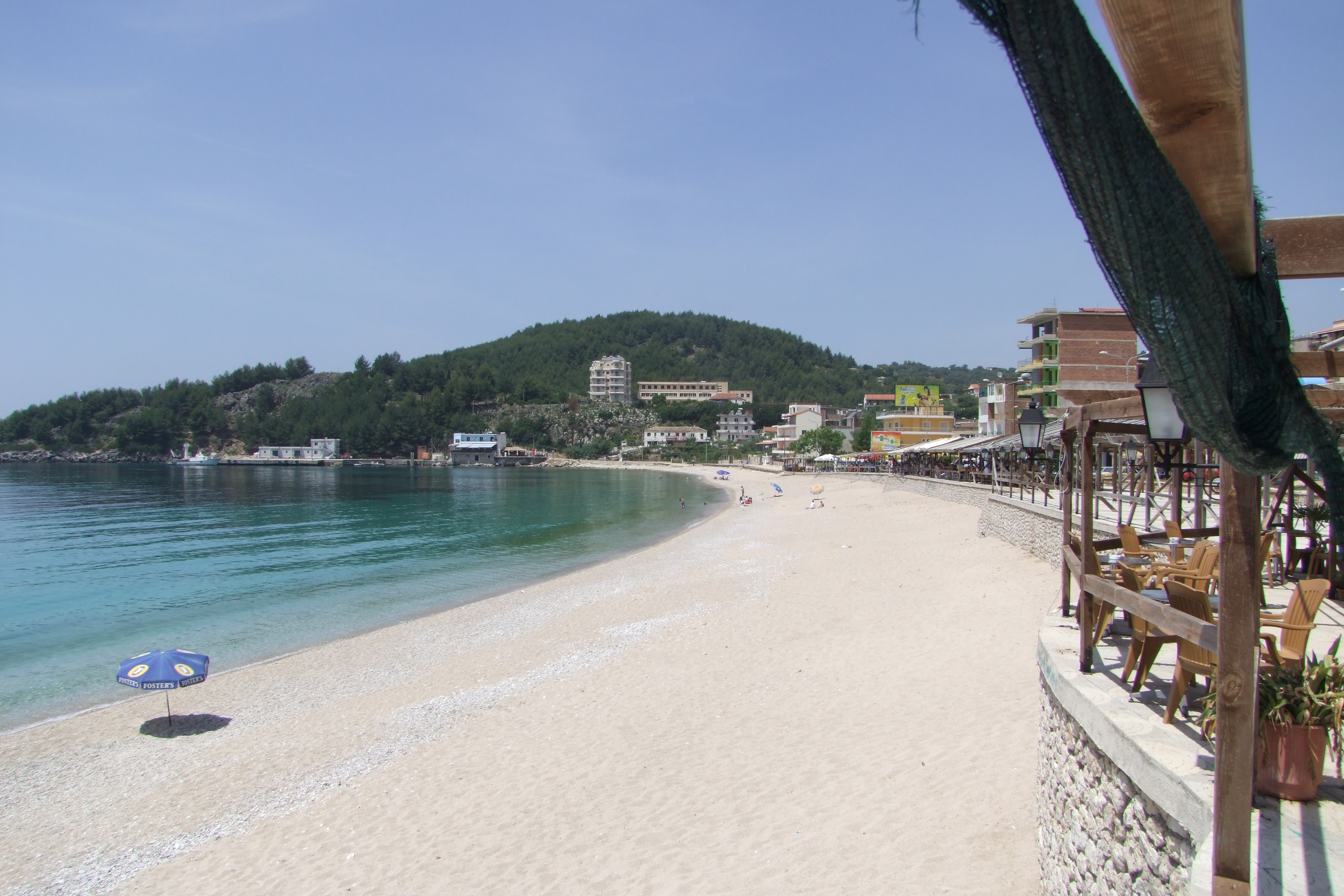
Albanian Riviera at Himarë

The area has a great potential for tourism, with the major characteristics of the municipal town being its seaside promenade, the tavernas and the traditionally preserved old town built on a hill. The town of Himarë consists of the old town, Kastro, situated on and around the old castle and the coastal region of Spilea, which is the touristic and economic center of the region. Other parts of the town are Potami, Livadhi, Zhamari, Michaili and Stefaneli. North of the town of Himarë lie the villages of Vuno, Ilias, Dhërmi, with its coastal region Jaliskari, and Palasë. Dhermi contains a number of recently built beach resorts. On the mountains lie Pilur and Kudhës, while Qeparo lies to the south of the town of Himarë.

The region has several Orthodox churches and monasteries, built with traditional Byzantine architecture, like the Monastery of the Cross, Athaliotissa, Saint Theodore, Virgin Mary in Dhërmi and Saint Demetrius. Moreover, a number of churches are located inside the castle of Himarë, which was initially built in classical antiquity, like the Church of Virgin Mary Kasopitra, Episkopi, which is built on the site of an ancient temple dedicated to Apollo, as well as the Aghioi Pantes church, in the entrance of the castle. Additional monuments in the castle include the mansion of the Spyromilios family and the Greek school.

== Sports ==
The city of Himarë's soccer club KF Himara. The club currently plays in the Albanian Second Division. Its home stadium is Petro Ruci Stadium in Orikum, Albania which is owned by KF Oriku and has a capacity of 2,000 people.

== Notable people ==
- Dhimitër Anagnosti, People's Artist of Albania, cineast, and former Minister of Culture, Youth and Sports
- Nafiz Bezhani, Albanian jurist, politician and writer
- Pano Bixhili, revolutionary
- Vasil Bollano, former mayor of Himarë and President of the organization of the Greek minority, "Omonoia"
- Pyrros Dimas, Greek weight-lifter
- Dimitrios Doulis, Greek military officer and minister of Defence of the Autonomous Republic of Northern Epirus
- Christos Armandos Gezos, Greek novelist and poet
- Zenel Gjoleka, leader of the Albanian Revolt of 1847
- Odhise Grillo (1932–2003), Albanian writer of children's books
- Hysni Kapo, military commander and leading member of the Party of Labour of Albania
- Zaho Koka, Albanian partisan, Hero of The People of Albania
- Spiro Jorgo (Gogo) Koleka (1879 or 1880–1940) prominent Albanian politician and activist
- Spiro Koleka (1908–2001), long-serving member of the Politburo of the Party of Labour of Albania
- Muzafer Korkuti, Albanian archaeologist and Vice President of the Academy of Sciences of Albania
- Vasil Laçi (1922–1941), Albanian patriot
- Sofokli Lazri, counselor of Enver Hoxha and writer
- Petro Marko, Albanian writer of the post-World War II era
- Zachos Milios (1805–1860), Greek Army officer and revolutionary
- Paskal Milo, Albanian historian, politician
- Koço Muka, Albanian politician, lawyer and Minister of Education in 1944
- Neço Muko, Albanian musician of the 1920s
- Robert Ndrenika, Albanian actor
- Niphon of Kafsokalyvia Greek Christian Orthodox saint and monk
- Sotiris Ninis, former international Greek football player
- Gogo Nushi, Albanian political figure and World War II guerilla
- Athanasios Pipis (–1821), revolutionary of the Greek War of Independence
- Andon Qesari, Albanian actor and director
- Spyromilios (1800–1880), Greek Army general and politician
- Pyrros Spyromilios (1913–1961), Greek Navy officer; director of the Greek Radio Orchestra
- Spyros Spyromilios (1864–1930), Greek Gendarmerie officer; declared the region's autonomy (1914)
- Georgios Stephanou (1824–1901), Greek gendarmerie officer; leader of the Epirus Revolt of 1878
- Andreas Tatos (1989–), football player of Olympiacos (Super League Greece)
- Leandro Zoto, politician and former mayor of Tirana
- Fredis Beleris, MEP of Greece

== See also ==
- Autonomous Republic of Northern Epirus
  - Northern Epirus
- Chaonians
- Epirus
- Himarë (town)
- List of cities in ancient Epirus
- Tourism in Albania
- Qafa e Vishës bus tragedy

== Sources ==
- Banac, Ivo; Ackerman, John G.; Szporluk, Roman; Vucinich, Wayne S. (1981). Nation and ideology: essays in honor of Wayne S. Vucinich. East European Monographs. ISBN 978-0-914710-89-9.
- Fine, John V. A. (1994). The Late Medieval Balkans: A Critical Survey from the Late Twelfth Century to the Ottoman Conquest. University of Michigan Press. ISBN 0-472-08260-4.
- Fleming, K. E. (2014). The Muslim Bonaparte: Diplomacy and Orientalism in Ali Pasha's Greece. Princeton University Press. ISBN 978-1-4008-6497-3.
- Gregorič, Nataša. "Contested Spaces and Negotiated Identities in Dhërmi/Drimades of Himarë/Himara area, Southern Albania" (PDF). University of Nova Gorica.
- Hammond, Nicholas Geoffrey Lemprière (1993). Collected Studies: Alexander and his successors in Macedonia. A.M. Hakkert. ISBN 978-90-256-1051-7.
- Hasiotis, Ioannis; Guirao, Motos (2008). Tendiendo Puentes en el Mediterráneo: Estudios Sobre las Relaciones Hispano-Griegas (ss. XV-XIX) (in Spanish). Granada: Centro de Estudios Bizantinos, Neogriegos y Chipriotas, University of Granada. ISBN 978-84-95905-28-4.
- Kallivretakis, Leonidas (1995). "Η ελληνική κοινότητα της Αλβανίας υπό το πρίσμα της ιστορικής γεωγραφίας και δημογραφίας [The Greek Community of Albania in terms of historical geography and demography]". In Veremis, Thanos (ed.). Ο Ελληνισμός της Αλβανίας [The Greeks of Albania]. University of Athens. pp. 25–58. ISBN 9600800545.
- Vasilēs G. Nitsiakos; Vassilis Nitsiakos (2010). On the Border: Transborder Mobility, Ethnic Groups and Boundaries Along the Albanian-Greek Frontier. LIT Verlag Münster. pp. 453–. ISBN 978-3-643-10793-0. OCLC 1040284039.
- Omari, Jeton (2014). Scanderbeg tra storia e storiografia [Skanderbeg between history and historiography] (PDF) (Thesis). University of Padua.
- Pappas, Nicholas Charles (1991). Greeks in Russian military service in the late eighteenth and early nineteenth centuries. Institute for Balkan Studies.
- Sakellariou, M. V. (1997). Epirus, 4000 Years of Greek History and Civilization. Athēna: Ekdotike Athenon. ISBN 9602133716.
- Totoni, Menela (1971). "Vëzhgime rreth të folmeve të Kurveleshit". Dialektologjia shqiptare I, In Domi, Mahir (ed.) (in Albanian). Tirana: Universiteti i Tiranës. pp. 31–117.
- Friedman, Victor (2005). Albanian in the Balkan Linguistic League: A Consideration of Theoretical Implications (PDF). Studia Albanica.
- Paçarizi, Rrahman (2008). Albanian Language (PDF). University of Pristina.
- Rusakov, Alexander (2021). "Contemporary Language Contacts in the Balkans: Situations and Outcomes". In Sobolev, Andrey (ed.). Between Separation and Symbiosis: South Eastern European Languages and Cultures in Contact. de Gruyter. ISBN 978-1501509254.
- Giakoumis, Konstantinos (2016). "Self-identifications by Himarriots, 16th to 19th Centuries". Erytheia. 37.
- Kyriazis, Doris (2016). "Γλωσσικές επαφές και διαστρωματώσεις στα αλβανικά και ελληνικά ιδιώματα της περιοχής Bregu i Detitsti". Βορειοηπειρωτικά (in Greek). Aristotle University of Thessaloniki.
