= Albanian revolt of 1566–1571 =

Albanian revolts against Ottoman Rule

The Albanian revolt of 1566–1571 were a series of conflicts between Albanian revolts against Ottoman rule during the second half of the 16th century.

== Events ==
The main centers of revolt in Ottoman Albania were the Himare region and the Dukagjin Highlands. Rebels from these areas had even attempted to coordinate their actions at times, such as during a meeting at the Cape of Rodon in 1551.

Rebellion erupted in 1566 in Himarë and the surrounding region following an Ottoman attempt to impose regular taxation. The rebels defeated an Ottoman army of 8.000-10.000 and offered Venice support for a potential Venetian invasion of Albania. In 1570, the rebels captured the Castle of Sopot, where a small number of Venetian mercenaries under Emmanuel Mormoris were installed. The few Venetians and a large number of Albanians unsuccessfully assaulted the castle of Nivica in January 1568, but managed to capture it in March 1571. In April 1571, the Ottomans sent two ships to Himara for tax collection and offered amnesty for the rebels. His offer was rejected and 6000 Albanian rebels from Himara and the nearby villages instead attacked and killed 350 Ottoman soldiers. The Albanians then called upon Mormoris and his mercenaries in Sopot Castle to attack the Ottomans. The Albanian army and the Venetian mercenaries assaulted the castle at Kardhiq, but were driven back. Mormori was subsequently captured during the Ottoman advance on Sopot Castle.

In northern Albania, rebels had erupted in large-scale rebellion in Dukagjin in 1565-1566, as well as in 1568 when the Ottomans had tried to tax the non-Muslims. By October 1570, 37 Albanian villages of the Ulqin area, as well as elders of villages near Shkoder had requested the Venetian governor for aid in anti-Ottoman operations since most Ottoman forces had left to quell the revolt in the southern Albanian region of Himare. Led by Bartolomeo Dukagjin (possibly of the noble Albanian Dukagjini family) and supported by the Venetians, the Albanian rebels captured the town of Lezhe in December 1570. Almost simultaneously, another revolt erupted in the region of Mat. Alarmed by the spread of the rebellions, between December 1570 and March 1571, the Sultan ordered local Ottoman authorities to gather a force of janissaries and cavalry to attack Lezhe. Ottoman forces under Ahmed Pasha advanced from Skopje to Albania, then northwest towards Ulqin, overcoming a combined Venetian-Albanian force on the river Buna before reaching Ulqin itself. The defenders finally surrendered the city after the Ottoman fleet of Ali Muezzinzade Pasha and Pertev Pasha appeared in front of the city.

Nevertheless various uprisings were still occurring both in the Albanian provinces of the Ottoman Empire. Rebels from Himara and Dukagjin were still coordinating with the Venetians, even managing to temporarily capture Lezhë and attack Shkodër, while another rebellion had broken out in the region from Elbasan to Ohrid.

== Revolts in other Balkan regions ==
At around the same period various incidents and revolts were reported in several other Ottoman-ruled regions in the Balkan peninsula in Greece, Montenegro and the Ohrid region.
