= Vasil Bollano =

Albanian politician

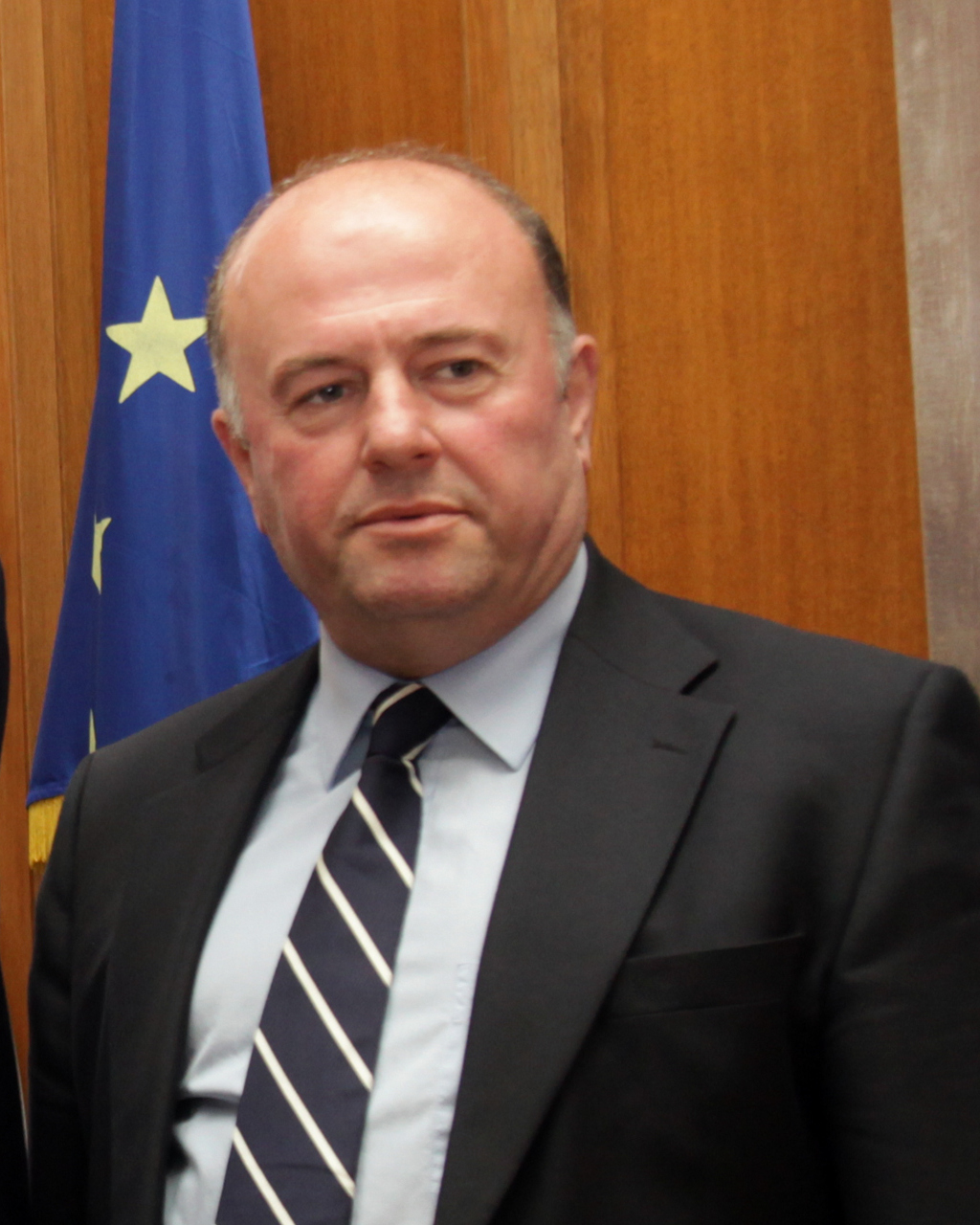
Bollano in Athens (c. May 2011)

Vasil Bollano (Greek: Βασίλης Μπολάνος, Vasilis Bolanos, born 7 July 1958) was the chairman of Omonoia and representative of the Greeks living in Albania.

== History ==
In 2007, Bollano asserted that the Greek community of Albania deserved the same rights as the Albanians in Kosovo. On April 21, 2009, he was sentenced to six months in prison and a 3800 euro fine, for removing road signs in the municipality. Bollano objected to the signs, which had been installed by national authorities, because they were written in Albanian only, and not in Greek also. Bollano appealed against the decision arguing that the installment of road signs was a matter of municipal jurisdiction, and the appeal court overturned the initial sentence.

In December 2009, after investigation of Vlora department of prosecutions, he was indicted for abuse of power and falsification of official documents after issuing illegal building permits along the Albanian southern coast.

On 24 May 2010, a bomb exploded on Bollano's apartment, causing damage to his house and nearby parked cars. The former mayor's house also came under attack during the previous elections.

Bollano was the former mayor of Himara municipality, in Southwestern Albania. An ethnic Greek, Vasil Bollano is the president of Omonoia, which represents the rights of Albania's Greek minority, as well as a member of the Unity for Human Rights Party. On 8 May 2011, he lost in the local elections to Jorgo Goro of the Socialist Party. Although Bollano lost the elections, his coalition secured the greatest number of seats in the municipal council.
