= St. Demetrius' Monastery Church, Qeparo =

Cultural monument of Albania

St. Demetrius' Monastery Church
- Kisha e Manastirit të Shën Mitrit (Albanian)
- Location: Qeparo

Cultural Monument of Albania

St. Demetrius' Monastery Church (Albanian: Kisha e Manastirit të Shën Mitrit) is an Albanian Orthodox monastery church in Qeparo, Vlorë County, Albania. It is a Cultural Monument of Albania.
