= Neço Muko =

- Born: Neço Muko; October 21, 1899; Himarë, Ottoman Empire (modern Albania)
- Origin: Albanian
- Died: December 12, 1934 (aged 35)
- Genres: Traditional music
- Occupation: Musician
- Instrument: Violin
- Years active: 1926–1934

Neço Muko (October 21, 1899 – 1934), also known as Neço Muko Himarjoti, was an Albanian singer and composer. His musical style created a new genre of Albanian iso-polyphony music called avaz himariot, or avaz himariotçe, that became identified with the music of his home region Himarë.

== Life and work ==
Muko was born on October 21, 1899, in Himarë, southern Albania (then Ottoman Empire). After attending primary school, he travelled to the Kingdom of Greece to study in a technical institute. He returned to Albania in 1916, during World War I. Muko learned by himself to play the violin and the mandolin and, in 1923, he started composing vaudevilles. In 1924, he moved to France, but in 1926 returned to Albania. In the town of Sarandë, he founded a choral group named Pif-Paf. In 1929 and 1930, he travelled again to France with his group to make recordings for Pathé Records, in which Albanian students studying in France took part. The group was composed by Koço Çakalli (marrës-1st voice), Pano Kokëveshi (kthyes-2nd voice), Neço Muko (hedhës-3rd voice as well a reciter of poetry), as well as a young Tefta Tashko-Koço. The recordings of the group increased his popularity in southern Albania and helped him establish his new genre the avaz himariot or avaz himariotçe.

Muko's best known song is Vajza e Valëve (English: Girl of the Waves), the poetical composition of which increased his reputation even more. In the 1920s, he also composed songs for well-known singers of Albanian urban music such as Marie Kraja and Tefta Tashko-Koço.

In 1932 Muko was diagnosed with tuberculosis of which he died, two years later, on 12 December 1934.

== Literature ==
  - Tole, Vasil (2014), Enciklopedia e iso-polifonisë popullore shqiptare (in Albanian)
