= Pyrros Spyromilios =

Greek Navy officer (1913–1961)

Pyrros Spyromilios (Greek: Πύρρος Σπυρομήλιος; 1913 – 31 March 1961) was a Greek officer of the Greek Navy in World War II and later director of the Greek Radio Orchestra.

Spyromilios was born in Himara, Northern part of Epirus Greece now days Albania. He became an officer in the Hellenic Navy and participated in the Greco-Italian War (1940-1941). During his service he was positioned in the Northern Epirus Naval Command. In December 1940, he participated in the military operations that led to the liberation of his home town by the Greek military. In another occasion, on March 1, 1941, in charge of a small patrol boat he repelled an attack by an Italian submarine that approached the shores of Himara, in the Panormos sector.

After the end the war Spyromilios became director of the Greek Radio Orchestra. During this era a number of new music celebrities emerged in Greece with his support, like Nana Mouskouri. Spyromilios also agreed to allow the composer Mikis Theodorakis to use his ensemble, along with the popular bouzouki instrumentalist, Manolis Chiotis, and singer Grigoris Bithikotsis, in a premier performance of the Epitaphios, a melodized poetic cycle by the leftist poet Yiannis Ritsos, in Greek radio. This was a rare move at a time when, following the Greek Civil War, the Left and any works associated with it was suppressed.

== Sources ==
- Κολοβός, Γεώργιος (2009). "Η Δράση του Ελληνικού Ναυτικού (Πολεμικού, Αντάρτικού και Εμπορικού) κατά την διάρκεια του Δεύτερου Παγκοσμίου Πολέμου" (PDF).
