= Kudhës =

- Village
- Location within Albania
- Coordinates: 40°5′59″N 19°49′2″E
- Country: Albania
- County: Vlorë
- Municipality: Himarë
- Administrative unit: Himarë
- Time zone: UTC+1 (CET)
  - Summer (DST): UTC+2 (CEST)

Kudhës is a village on the Albanian Riviera, Vlorë County, Albania. It is part of the Himarë municipality.

== Etymology ==
Kudhës and the river with the same name is related to the Albanian word kudh "pot, jug", therefore meaning "potter’s river, pot-shaped river". The toponym is formed with the Albanian nominal suffix --ëѕ, cf. Gjerbës, Krahëѕ.

It was recorded as Kudes in 1431 in Ottoman defters and Coudessi in 1805 by François Pouqueville.

== Demographics ==
The village of Kudhës is inhabited by an Orthodox Albanian population.
