= Christos Armandos Gezos =

Greek author and poet (born 1988)

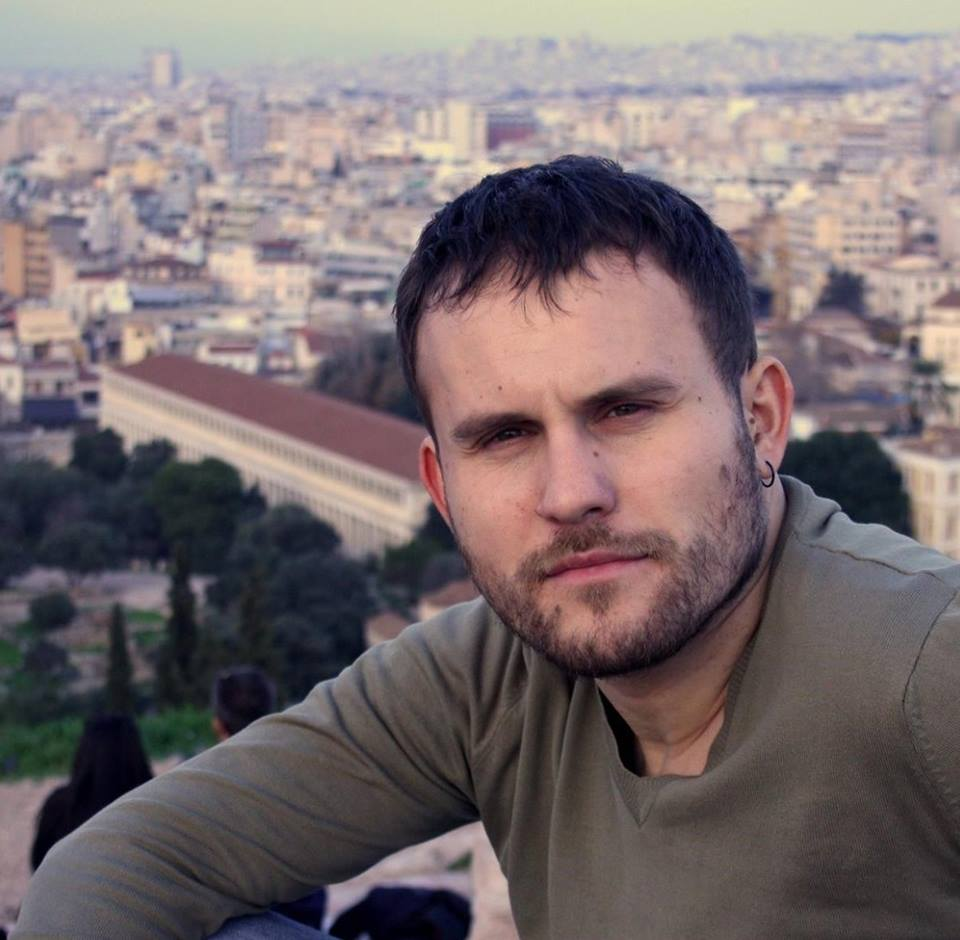
Christos Armando Gezos, in Athens (2015)

Christos Armandos Gezos (Greek: Χρήστος Αρμάντο Γκέζος, born 1988) is a Greek author and poet. Gezos was born in Himara, southern Albania, and grew up in Skala Laconia, Greece. For his poetry collection Ανεκπλήρωτοι Φόβοι (Unfullfilled Fears), he received in 2014 the State Literary Award for Debuting Author. He has also published a novel, Η λάσπη (The mud).

== Early life and education ==
Gezos was born in 1988, in Himara, a small coastal city in the Greek minority zone of southern Albania. In 1991 and after the opening of the Greek-Albanian borders that followed the collapse of the communist regime in Albania, his family immigrated to Greece, particularly in Skala, Laconia, a town half an hour south of Sparta. He studied at the National Technical University of Athens as a Surveying Engineer. He currently lives in Athens.

== Works ==
Gezos started writing poems and stories when he was 19 years old. In 2012 he published his first book, a poetry collection called Ανεκπλήρωτοι φόβοι (Unfullfilled fears), for which he was awarded in the State Literary Awards of Greece in 2014 as "The Best Debuting Author" of the year. In 2014, he published his first novel Η λάσπη (The mud), which was in the short list of the Athens Prize for Literature, for the best Greek novel of 2014.
