= Omonoia (organization) =

Organization

- Democratic Union of the Greek Minority – OMONOIA
- Δημοκρατική Ένωση Εθνικής Ελληνικής Μειονότητας – ΟΜΌΝΟΙΑ
- Founded: 1991; Derviçan, Dropull, Albania
- Type: Political and cultural organization
- Purpose: Minority rights of Greeks
- Location: Albania

The Democratic Union of the Greek Minority – OMONOIA (Greek: Δημοκρατική Ένωση Εθνικής Ελληνικής Μειονότητας – ΟΜΌΝΟΙΑ; Albanian: Unioni Demokratik i Minoritetit Grek – OMONOIA), better known by its short name Omonoia (Greek: Ομόνοια, lit. 'Concord / Peace'), is a social, political and cultural organization in Albania that promotes minority rights for the Greek minority in the south of the country.

== Structure ==
Omonoia has four affiliates in the cities of Sarandë, Delvinë, Gjirokastër and Tirana, and some sub-sections in Korçë, Vlorë and Përmet. Its leading forum is the General Council consisting of 45 members, it is elected by the General Conference and held every two years.

== History ==
The organisation was founded in 1991, after the collapse of the PPSh regime, in the village of Derviçan, by representatives of the Greek national minority. It called for the autonomy of Northern Epirus in 1991 on the basis that the rights provided for the minority under the Albanian constitution were highly precarious. This proposal was rejected and thereby spurred the organization's radical wing to 'call for Union with Greece'.

Under the name "Democratic Union of the Greek Minority", Omonoia contested the Constituent Assembly elections in March and April 1991, the first multi-party elections held since World War II. Despite receiving just 0.7% of the vote, Omonoia won five seats in the 250-seat Assembly. However, it did not contest any subsequent elections. Omonoia was banned from contesting the 1992 elections on the grounds that it violated an Albanian law forbidding the 'formation of parties on a religious, ethnic and regional basis'. This situation was contested during the following elections on behalf of Omonoia by the Unity for Human Rights Party - a party which represents the Greek minority in the Albanian parliament.

=== Trial of the five ===
In late August 1994, when an Albanian court sentenced five members (a sixth member was added later) of Omonoia to prison terms of 6–8 years on charges of treason, because they demanded that Northern Epirus be granted to Greece, and for illegal carrying of arms. Greece responded by freezing all EU aid to Albania, sealing its border with Albania, and between August–November 1994, expelling over 115,000 illegal Albanian immigrants, a figure quoted in the US Department of State Human Rights Report and given to the American authorities by their Greek counterpart. In December 1994, however, Greece began to permit limited EU aid to Albania, while Albania released two of the Omonoia defendants and reduced the sentences of the remaining four. Their arrest was substantially marred by procedural shortcomings in the search of their homes and offices, their detention and their trial. None of the arrestees had access to legal counsel during their initial detention. Four of the five ethnic Greek members of Omonoia stated that, during their detention, authorities subjected them to physical and psychological pressure, including beatings, sleep deprivation, and threats of torture. The Albanian Government rejected these claims. The five ethnic Greeks also complained of lack of access to their families during the first 3 months of their 4-month investigation. During their trial, a demonstration by a group of about 100 Greek lawyers, journalists, and ethnic Greek citizens of Albania took place outside the courthouse. The Albanian Police broke up the protest and detained about 20 lawyers and journalists. The members of Omonoia were eventually sentenced to 6- to 8-year terms, which were subsequently reduced on appeal.

=== Political motivated kidnappings ===
In June 1997 two political motivated kidnappings were reported of relatives of Omonoia members. One of them was the father of the Albanian opposition candidate, who has been required to withdraw her candidacy from the upcoming general elections. The second was the son-in-law of a former Omonoia chairman.

=== Protests against irregularities in the 2011 census ===
In early October 2011, the Albanian government announced that a census would be conducted throughout the country, which would count the exact size of ethnic minorities for the first time after 1989. However, after proposal of the nationalist oriented PDIU, the Albanian government fined $1,000 every citizen that declared an ethnicity other than what was written down on their birth certificate, even if this certificate was written during the era of the pre-1989 communist regime where minority status was limited to only 99 villages. Omonoia responded that such a procedure contains serious irregularities and will absent in case these issues are not resolved.

This is believed to have been an attempt to intimidate minorities into declaring Albanian ethnicity, as the Albanian government has furthermore additionally declared that it would prosecute anyone who did not participate in the census, or refused to declare their ethnicity.

Due to the irregularities in the census procedure, Omonoia representatives conducted another census in order to count the members of the ethnic Greek minority. According to this, a total of 286,852 individuals were counted, which equals to ca. 10% of the population of the country. During the time the census was conducted, half of this number resided permanently in Greece, but maintained strong contacts with its homeland.

=== Prison sentence to Korçë branch leader ===
In January 2012 the leader of the Korçë branch of Omonoia, Naum Disho (Greek: Ναούμ Δίσιος Naoum Disios), was sentenced to prison for constructing a memorial for the fallen Greek soldiers of the Greco-Italian War in Boboshticë, due to accusations of desecrating ethnic Albanian graves, however his sentence was overturned.
