= List of archaeological sites in Albania =

This is a list of archaeological sites in Albania.

== Archaeological parks ==
Name	Photo	Area	County	Location
Amantia		15 hectares (37 acres)	Vlorë County	List of archaeological sites in Albania is located in Albania
Antigonia		92 hectares (230 acres)	Gjirokastër County	List of archaeological sites in Albania is located in Albania
Apollonia		140 hectares (350 acres)	Fier County	List of archaeological sites in Albania is located in Albania
Byllis		30 hectares (74 acres)	Fier County	List of archaeological sites in Albania is located in Albania
Lissus		22 hectares (54 acres)	Lezhë County	List of archaeological sites in Albania is located in Albania
Oricum		694 hectares (1,710 acres)	Vlorë County	List of archaeological sites in Albania is located in Albania
Phoenice		57 hectares (140 acres)	Vlorë County	List of archaeological sites in Albania is located in Albania
Shkodër		70 hectares (170 acres)	Shkodër County	List of archaeological sites in Albania is located in Albania

== Archaeological remnants ==
- Ad Quintum
- Albanopolis
- Amphitheatre of Durrës
- Arapaj
- Arapaj Basilica
- Badhër Castle
- Barç
- Basilica of Ballsh
- Belësh
- Borsh
- Buqezë
- Butrint
- Fterrë
- Gjuricaj Basilica
- Hadrianopolis
- Hills of Triport
- Justinianopolis
- Kamenica Tumulus
- Katundas Cavern
- Kratul
- Nikaia, Illyria
- Olympe
- Persqop
- Rock inscriptions of the Bay of Grama
- Royal Tombs of Selca e Poshtme
- Selcë e Poshtme
- Shurdhah Island
- Tirana Mosaic
- Vlusha
