= Badhër Castle =

Prehistoric fortified site in southern Albania

- Kalaja e Badhrës (Albanian)
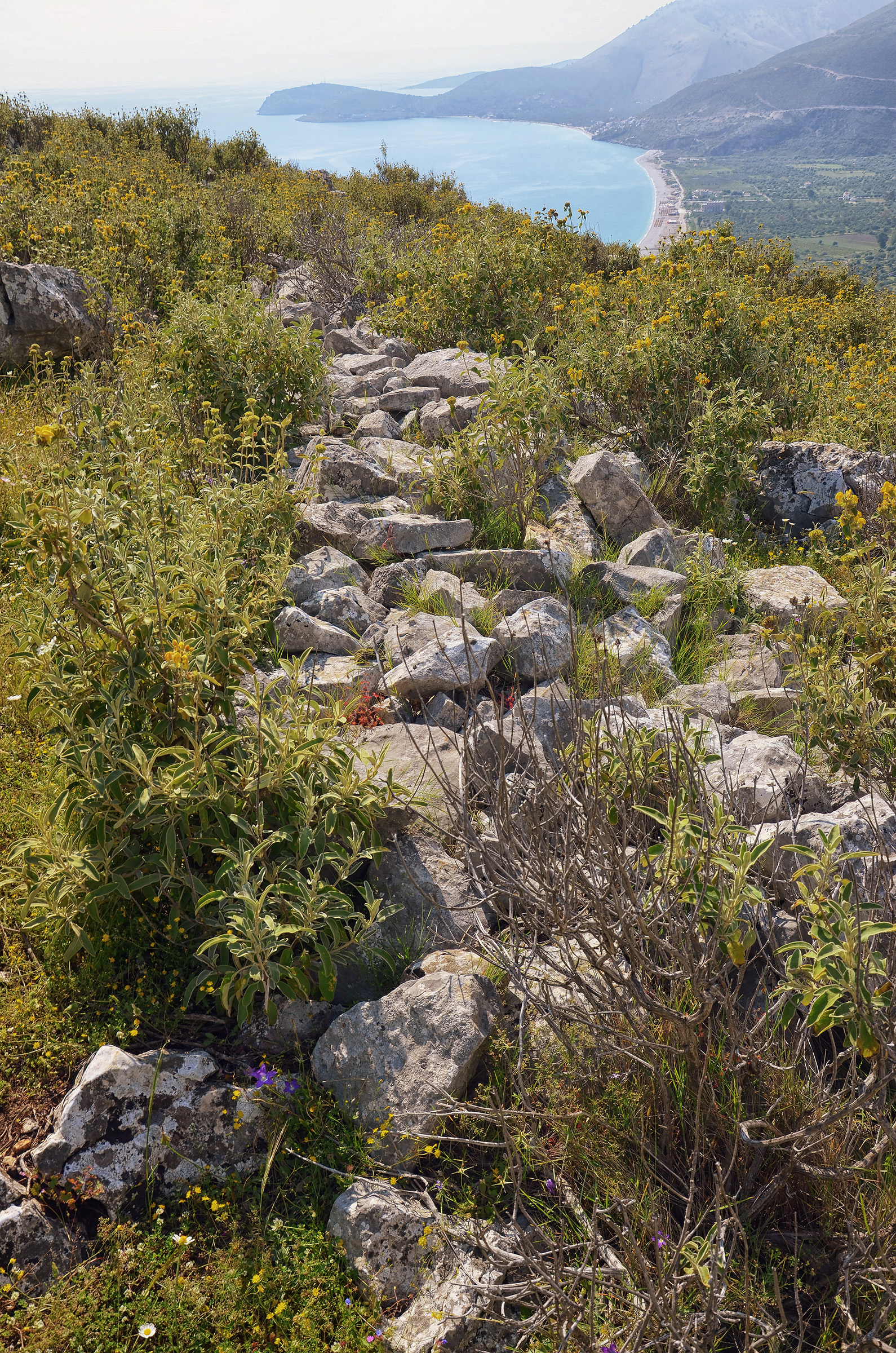
- Ruins on Badhër hill near Borsh
- Interactive map of Badhër Castle
- 40.05°N 19.83°E
- Type: Hilltop fortification
- Location: Borsh, Vlorë County, Albania

History
- Built: Late Bronze Age

Site notes
- Architectural style: Dry-stone fortification

Badhër Castle (Albanian: Kalaja e Badhrës) is a prehistoric fortified hilltop site and later medieval ruin near Borsh, in southern Albania. It occupies a strategic position above the coastal road between Borsh and Piqeras, overlooking the Ionian Sea.

Archaeological evidence places Badhër within the network of small fortified settlements that developed along the Ionian coast during the Late Bronze Age. These sites mark one of the earliest phases of fortified occupation known in the region and form part of the early Illyrian cultural landscape. Surveys in the Borsh area group Badhër with nearby fortified hills such as Kukum, Çip, Gjashnjar, Borsh (Sopot) and Karos.

== History ==
During the Bronze Age, communities in what is now southern Albania began to occupy naturally defensible hills, reinforcing them with stone walls to protect their settlements. According to excavations at Maliq and other sites, these communities built rectangular huts with hearths and ovens and developed local traditions of bronze casting and pottery production. By the Late Bronze Age (c. 1500–1200 BCE), fortified hill settlements had become characteristic of the emerging Illyrian culture, maintaining close contact with the Aegean world.

Within this wider pattern, Badhër is one of a series of fortified hilltop sites identified along the Ionian coast and in the hinterland near Borsh. These sites are interpreted as Late Bronze Age and early Classical communities whose hilltop fortifications were later reused and modified by rural settlements in antiquity and the medieval period.

== Description ==
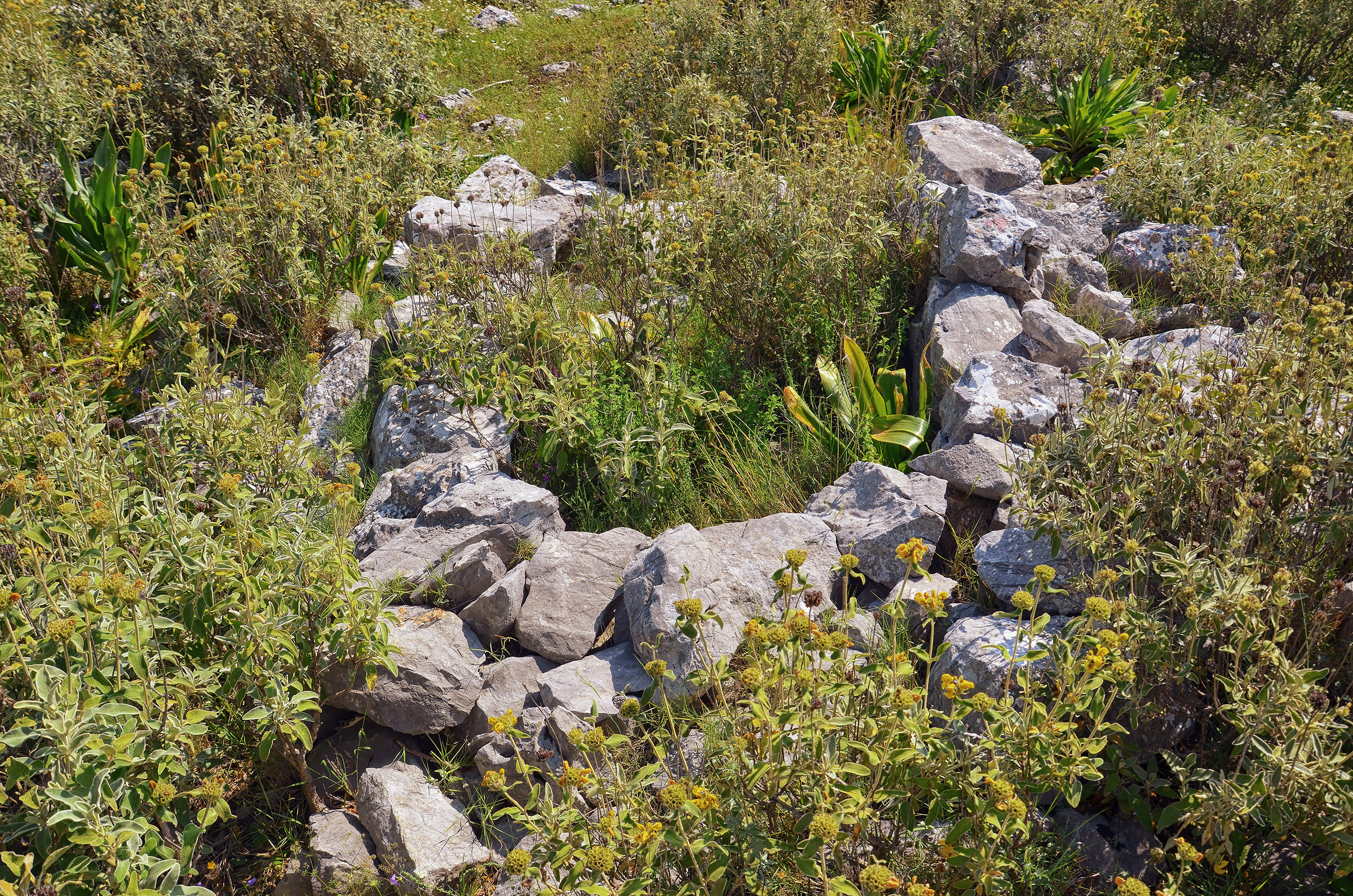
Ruins of the Late Bronze Age fortified settlement at Badhër.

Badhër Castle stands on the hill of the same name above the road from Borsh towards Piqeras, in a coastal belt where a number of prehistoric fortifications are concentrated (Himarë, Porto Palermo, Qeparo, Lukovë). Its position controls movement between the Ionian coast and the interior. The site lies to the south-west of Borsh village, about 7 km (4.3 mi) from Fterrë, and overlooks the coastline of Lukovë and Piqeras.

The fortification lies about 250 m (820 ft) above sea level on a hill dominating the Borsh plain and coast. The enclosing wall, about 180 m (590 ft) in length and between 2 and 2.3 m (6.6 and 7.5 ft) thick, surrounds the summit and has a single southern entrance. The enclosure has an irregular elliptical plan. Its surviving walls, roughly 2 m (6.6 ft) high and built without mortar from small and medium stones, represent an early phase of fortified construction dated to the Late Bronze Age.

The fort follows the contours of the rocky hill and uses natural slopes for defence, especially on the southern side. Inside, the surface is partly rocky and shows few traces of habitation, which has led surveys to suggest limited or seasonal occupation of the enclosed area. Outside the northern and western walls, remains of several dwellings have been recorded and are among the earliest known domestic structures of the Bronze Age in Albania.

== Archaeology ==
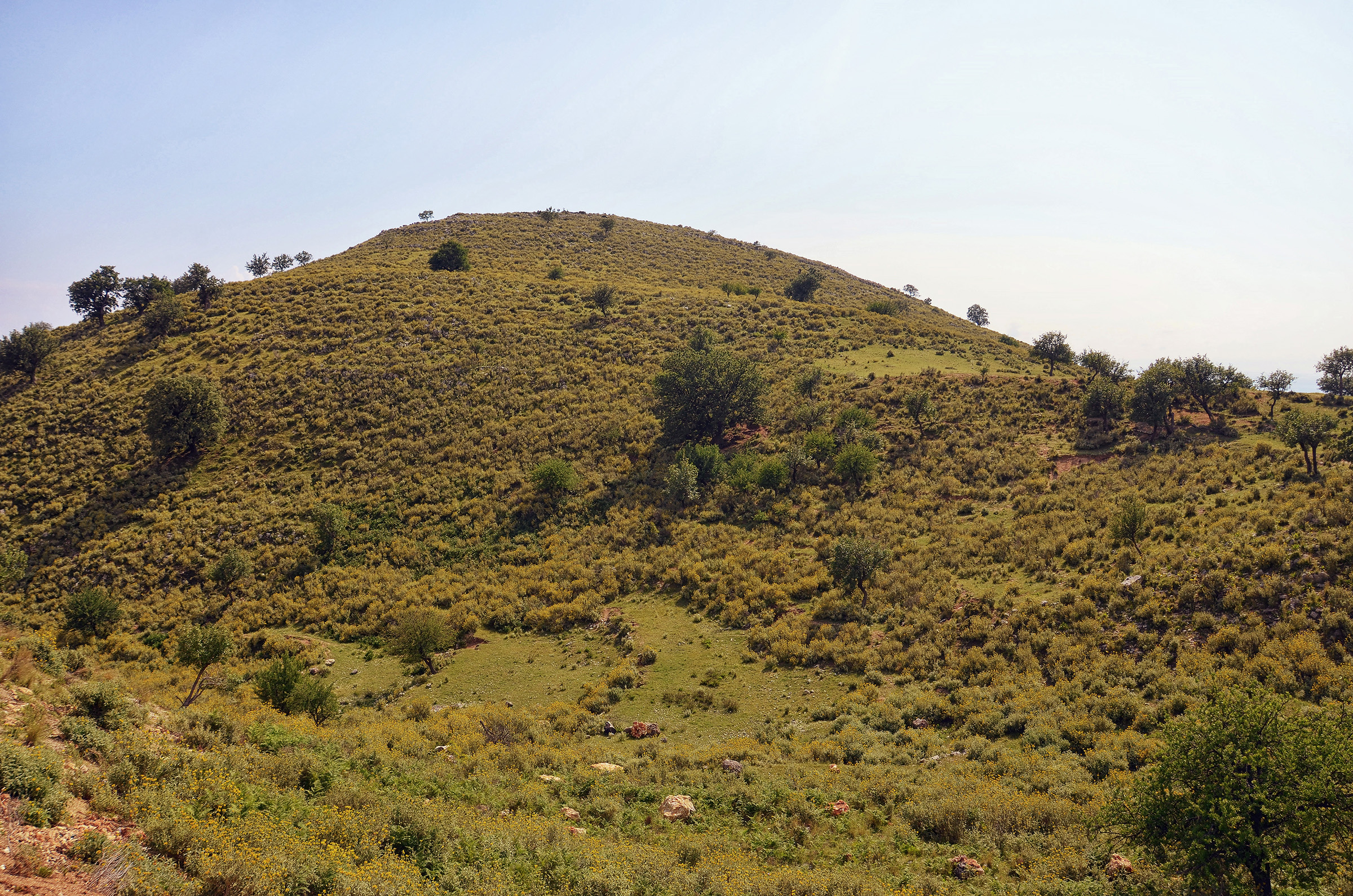
Hill where the castle is located and where traces of prehistoric dwellings have been identified.

Albanian archaeological surveys group Badhër with sites such as Kukum, Çip, Gjashnjar, Borsh and Karos as small fortified settlements that contained dwelling structures rather than simple refuges. These are interpreted as Late Bronze Age and early Classical hilltop communities, later reused by nearby rural settlements.

Archaeological work across Albania in recent years has expanded understanding of prehistoric fortifications in the Ionian and southern regions, where sites like Badhër illustrate the early development of fortified settlement patterns from the Bronze Age onward. Research in the Borsh area has identified several fortified sites dating from the Late Bronze Age to the medieval period. The nearby fortification of Sopot (modern Borsh), about 310 m (1,020 ft) above sea level, preserves walls from the Late Bronze Age and the 5th century BCE built from large roughly cut blocks, similar to those at Butrint. Some dwellings were located outside the main enclosure, as at Badhër and Kukum.

== See also ==
- Borsh Castle (Sopot), a nearby fortified acropolis with medieval remains
- List of castles in Albania

== Sources ==
- Çipa, Kriledjan; Meshini, Mariglen (2016). "Të dhëna të reja rreth fortifikimeve paraurbane në Shqipërinë Jugperëndimore". Iliria (in Albanian). 40. doi:10.3406/iliri.2016.2516.
- Cook, Stanley Arthur; Charlesworth, Martin Percival; Bury, John Bagnell; Bury, John Bernard (1924). The Cambridge Ancient History. Cambridge University Press. ISBN 978-0-521-22496-3.
- Gilkes, Oliver; Melfi, Milena; Muka, Belisa (2024). "Archaeology in Albania, 2014–2024". Archaeological Reports. 70: 173–192. doi:10.1017/S0570608424000048.
- "Kalaja e Badhrës". Pine Albania. 9 August 2022.
- ""Kalaja e Badhrës" (Borsh)". Bashkia Himarë. 24 June 2020.
