= Lukovë =

- Administrative unit
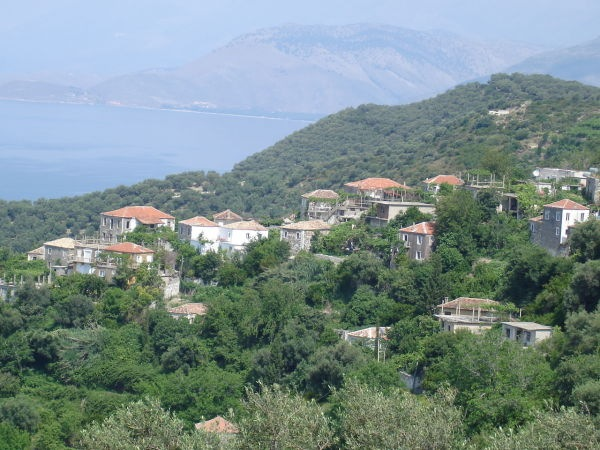
- Lukova village

- Location within Albania
- Coordinates: 39°59′N 19°55′E
- Country: Albania
- County: Vlorë
- Municipality: Himarë

Population (2011)
  - Administrative unit: 2,916
- Time zone: UTC+1 (CET)
  - Summer (DST): UTC+2 (CEST)

Lukovë is a village and a former municipality in Vlorë County, southern Albania. At the 2015 local government reform, it became a subdivision of the municipality Himarë. The population at the 2011 census was 2,916.

== Name ==
The Albanian toponym Lukovë stems from Slavic, either from the words Luk, Laka, Luka meaning water flowing nearby, meadowland, river meadow, wet meadow along a river or from luk, luka, place of onions; alongside the suffix ov/a. It is known in Greek as "Λούκοβο".

== History ==
During the Ottoman period, Lukovë, together with nearby Piqeras and Nivicë, was a part of the Himara area and enjoyed special semi-autonomous status inside this community. In 1570 and 1571, a short-lived rebellion broke out under Emmanuel Mormoris in the Himara region. After a prolonged siege, the rebels managed to capture the castle of Nivicë.

The Italian missionary Giuseppe Schirò wrote in 1722 that Lukovë was inhabited by ethnic Albanians.

In 1798, Lukovë, together with adjacent villages in the region south of Himara, were attacked and plundered by the local Ottoman lord Ali Pasha of Ioannina. In the villages of Nivice and Shën Vasil, massacres of Orthodox inhabitants were committed around Easter of 1798. As such, cases of largescale Islamization among the local population were followed in the region.

During the end of the 19th century, Greek elementary schools were already operating in the villages of Lukovë, Nivicë, Çorraj and Shën Vasil.

== Demographics ==
According to 1991 estimates, Lukovë, the municipal seat is inhabited by a majority Orthodox Albanian population (2076 or 82%), alongside minorities of Muslim Albanians (250 or 12%) and Greeks (150 or 6%). Borsh, Fterrë and Sasaj are exclusively populated by Muslim Albanians. Piqeras is inhabited by an Orthodox Albanian majority (991) with a minority of 100 Muslim Albanians and 50 Greeks. Çorraj is a mixed village inhabited by an Orthodox Albanian population and Albanian Muslims. Shën Vasil (Shënvasil) is inhabited by a majority Orthodox Albanian population (1434) and with a minority of Muslim Albanians (220) and Greeks (210). Nivicë is inhabited by an Orthodox Albanian majority (899) and a minority of Greeks (30). Qazim Pali is a new village established during the communist period and is populated by Muslim Albanians (861) alongside minorities of Orthodox Albanians (50) and Greeks (80). In a demographic investigation by Leonidas Kallivretakis in the late 20th century, the population of Lukovë commune and all its villages, 54% were Albanian Christians, 40% were Albanian Muslims and 6% were Greek Christians.

According to a 2016 estimate the municipality is by majority Albanian speaking with a minority of Greek speakers.

The Albanians of the Lukovë region speak in the Tosk dialect of the Albanian language; more specifically in the Lab regional dialect.

Seaside settlements of the Lukovë area were among Greek minority areas that underwent a substantial decrease in population after the fall of communism in Albania in the early 1990s.

== Climate ==
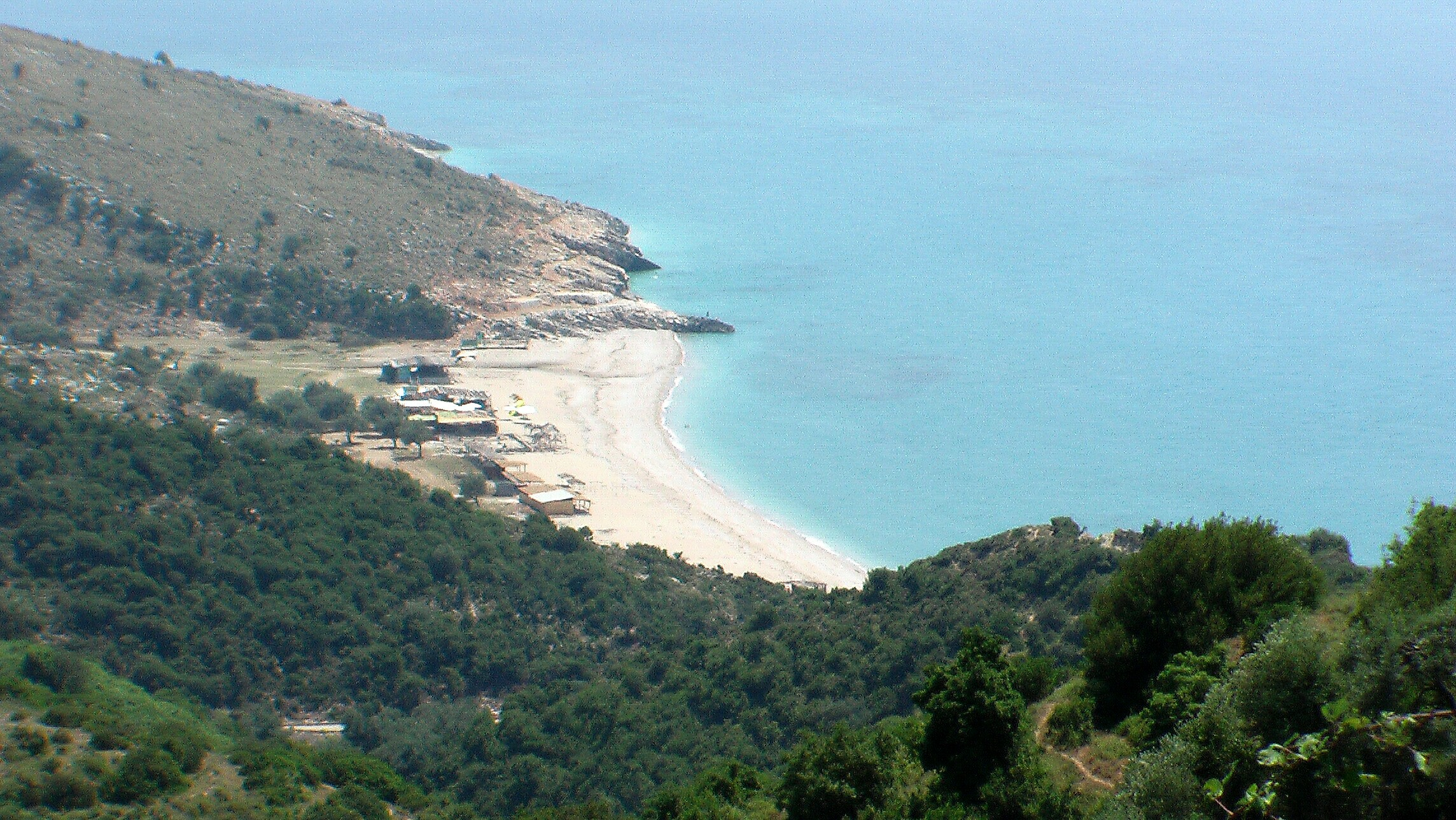
Lukovë is located within the Mediterranean Biogeographic Region.

Lukovë has a hot-summer mediterranean climate (Köppen Csa). Precipitation mainly falls within the winter months. Lukovë has mild winters and hot, dry summers. The average annual temperature is 15.1 °C or 59.2 °F. Precipitation amounts to 737 mm or 29.0 inches annually.

== Notable people ==
- Nafiz Bezhani, Albanian jurist, politician and writer.
- Dimitrios Doulis (1865–1928), Greek politician, minister of military affairs of the Autonomous Republic of Northern Epirus, from Nivice.
- Muzafer Korkuti, Albanian archaeologist and Vice President of the Academy of Sciences of Albania
- Vasil Laçi (1922–1941), Albanian patriot who attempted to kill in 1941 Victor Emmanuel III, then King of Italy and Shefqet Bej Vërlaci, then Prime Minister of Albania
- Jakup Mato, Albanian publicist and educational administrator, head of Centre of Art Studies of the Academy of Sciences of Albania.
- Niphon of Kafsokalyvia (1316–1411), Greek monk and saint of the Eastern Orthodox Church

== See also ==
- List of cities and towns in Albania

== Sources ==
- Bartl, Peter (1991). "Zur Topographie und Geschichte der Landschaft Himara in Südalbanien". Münchner Zeitschrift für Balkankunde (in German). 7–8. ISBN 9783878281962. ISSN 0170-8929.
- Borgia, Nilo (2014). "Kapitulli V: At Giuseppe Schirò-i". In Sinani, Shaban (ed.). Murgjit bazilianë të Italisë në Shqipëri: Shënime mbi misionet në Himarë, shek. XVI-XVIII (in Albanian). Translated by Hysa, Mimoza. Naimi. ISBN 978-9928-109-67-5.
