= Albanian Riviera =

Tourist attraction in Albania

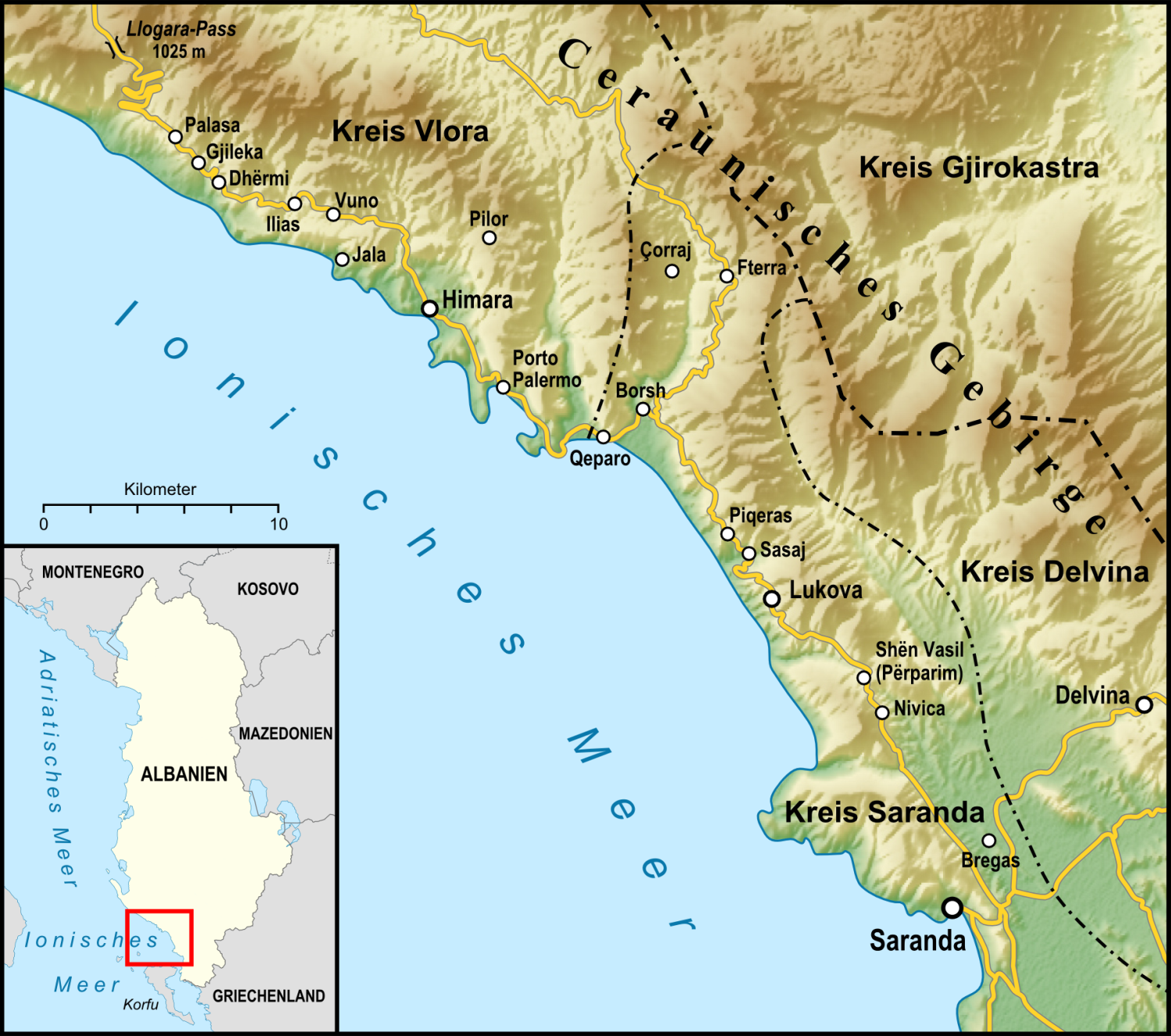
Topographical map of the Albanian Riviera

The Albanian Riviera (Albanian: Riviera shqiptare, pronounced [ɾiviˈɛɾa ʃcipˈtaɾɛ]), also popularly known as Bregu, is a coastline along the north-eastern Ionian Sea in the Mediterranean Sea, encompassing the districts of Sarandë and Vlorë in south-western Albania. It forms an important section of the Albanian Ionian Sea Coast, dotted with the villages of Palasë, Kondraq, Dhërmi, Ilias, Vuno, Himara, Pilur, Kudhës, Qeparo, Borsh, Piqeras, Sasaj, Lukovë, Shën Vasil and Nivicë-Bubari.

The riviera should not be confused with the entire coastline of the country, which includes the Ionian Sea Coast, and the mostly flat Adriatic Sea Coast in the north. The Ceraunian Mountains separate the coast from the hinterland. The area is a major nightlife, ecotourist, and elite retreat destination in Albania. It features traditional Mediterranean villages, ancient castles, churches, monasteries, secluded turquoise beaches, bays, mountain passes, seaside canyons, coves, rivers, underwater fauna, caves, and orange, lemon, and olive groves. During the classical times, 48 BC during his pursuit of Pompey, Julius Caesar set foot and rested his legion at Palasë. He continued onto Llogara Pass in a place later named Caesar's Pass.

The region gained international attention after the 2009 reconstruction of the coastal road SH8, the 2010 tour stop of DJ Tiësto in Dhermi, and the filming of a Top Gear episode featuring a breathtaking car pursuit along the winding coastal road. The Albanian Riviera was proclaimed as the 2012 Top Value Destination by Frommer's. The area has been host to several international music festivals such as Kala Festival, Soundwave Albania, and Turtle Fest, while becoming known for its long standing nightclubs such as Havana Beach Club near Dhermi and recently opened Folie Marine in Jale beach. The number of tourists has increased significantly since 2016. More and more Europeans travel to the Albanian Reviera from year to year, especially from the United Kingdom, Germany, Italy, Sweden, France, Bosnia and Herzegovina, Poland, Ukraine, Moldova, North Macedonia, Serbia and Croatia.

As part of the regional master plan, the World Bank and other institutions are financing local infrastructure projects, including the renovation of roofs and facades of traditional houses overlooking the Riviera, town squares redesign, and the construction of water supply and treatment plants.

== Landmarks ==
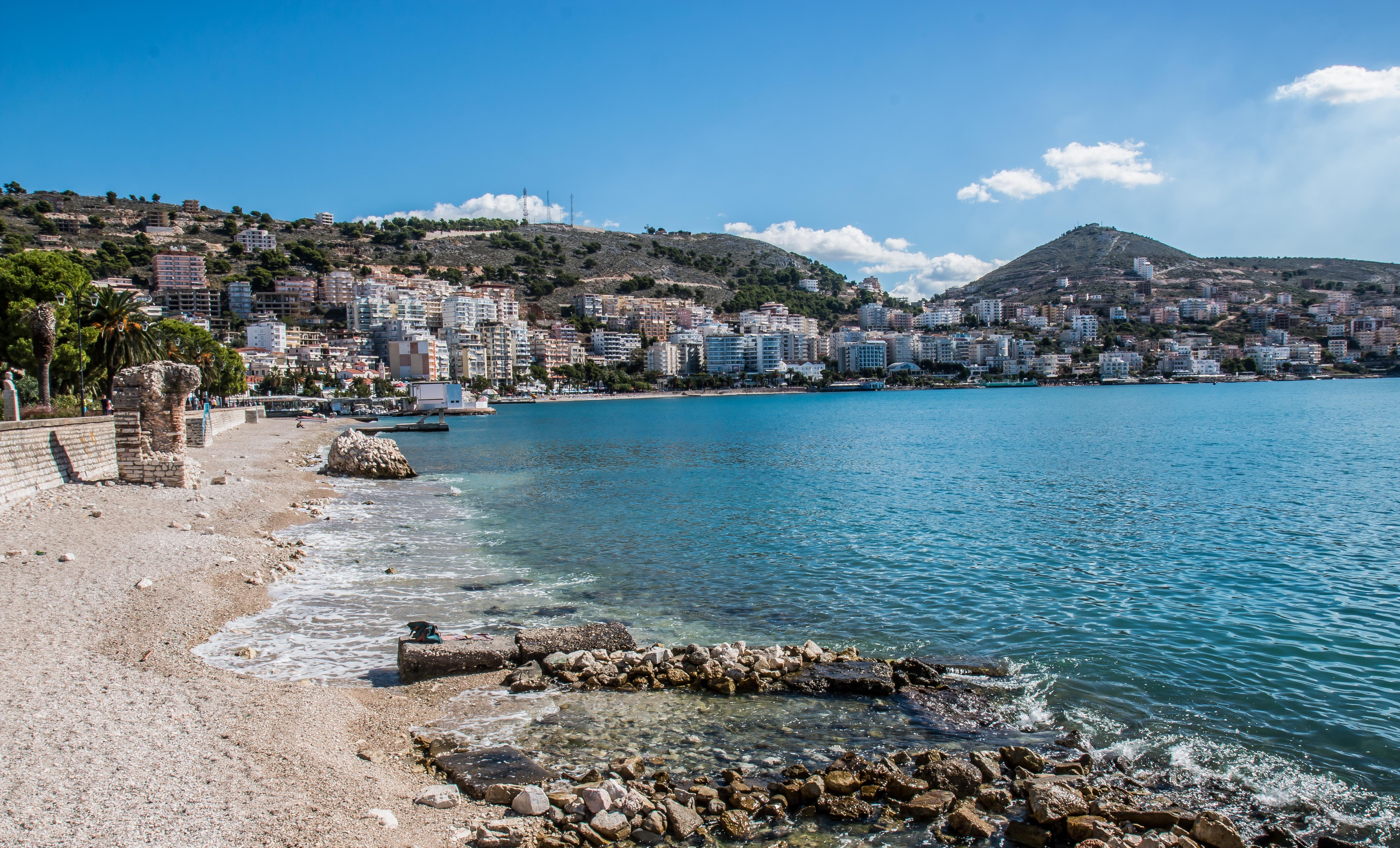
Sarandë

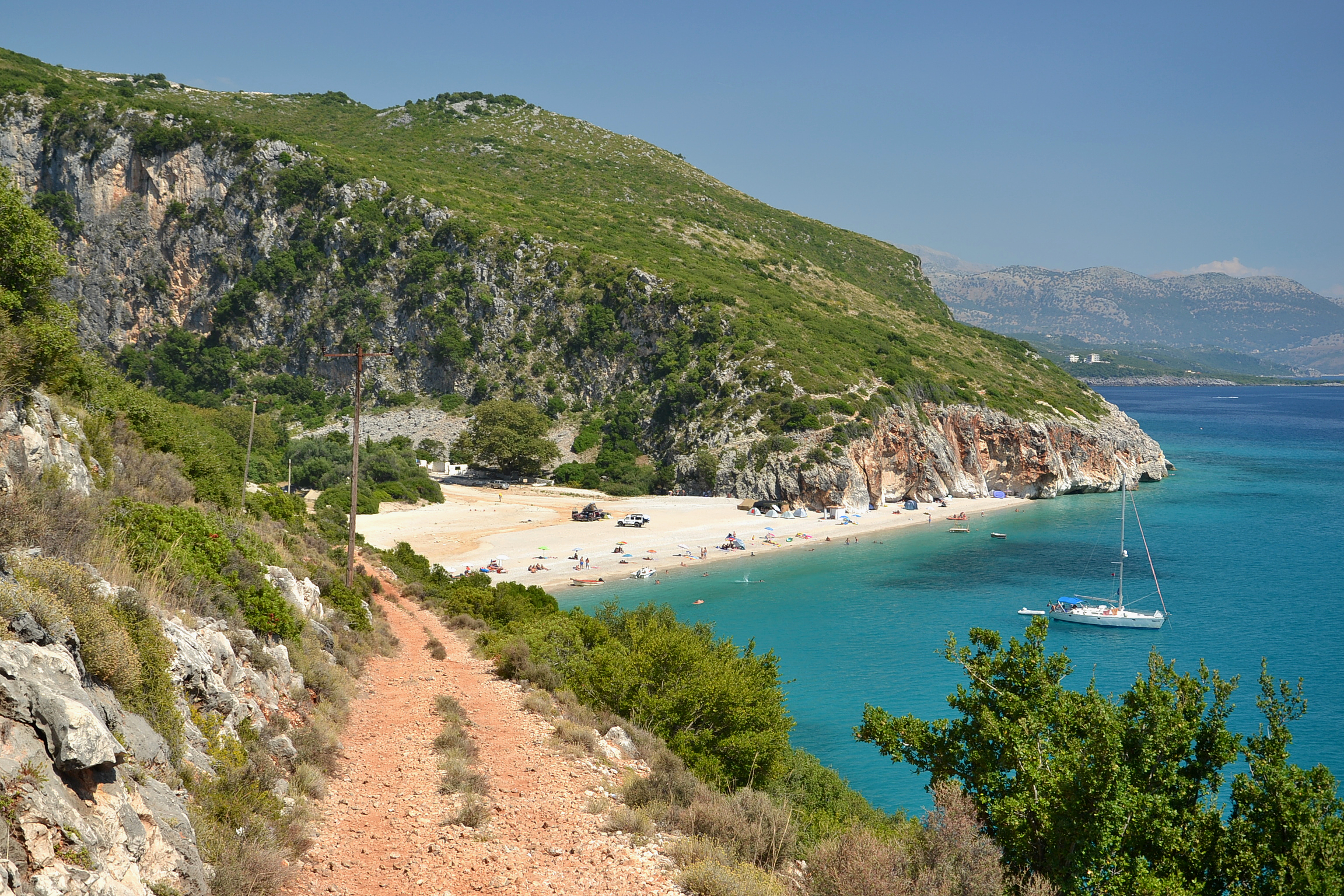
Canyon of Gjipe

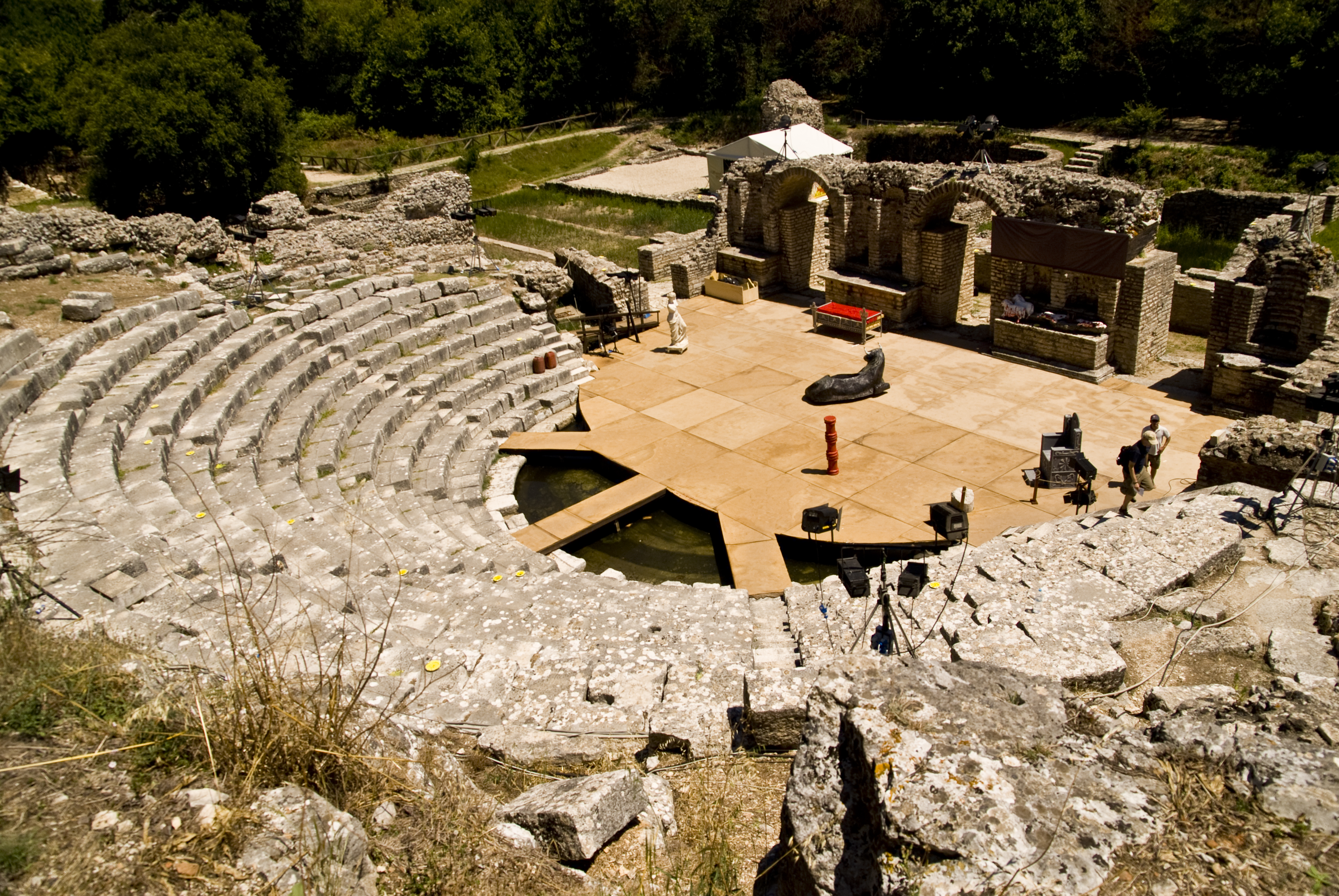
Butrint

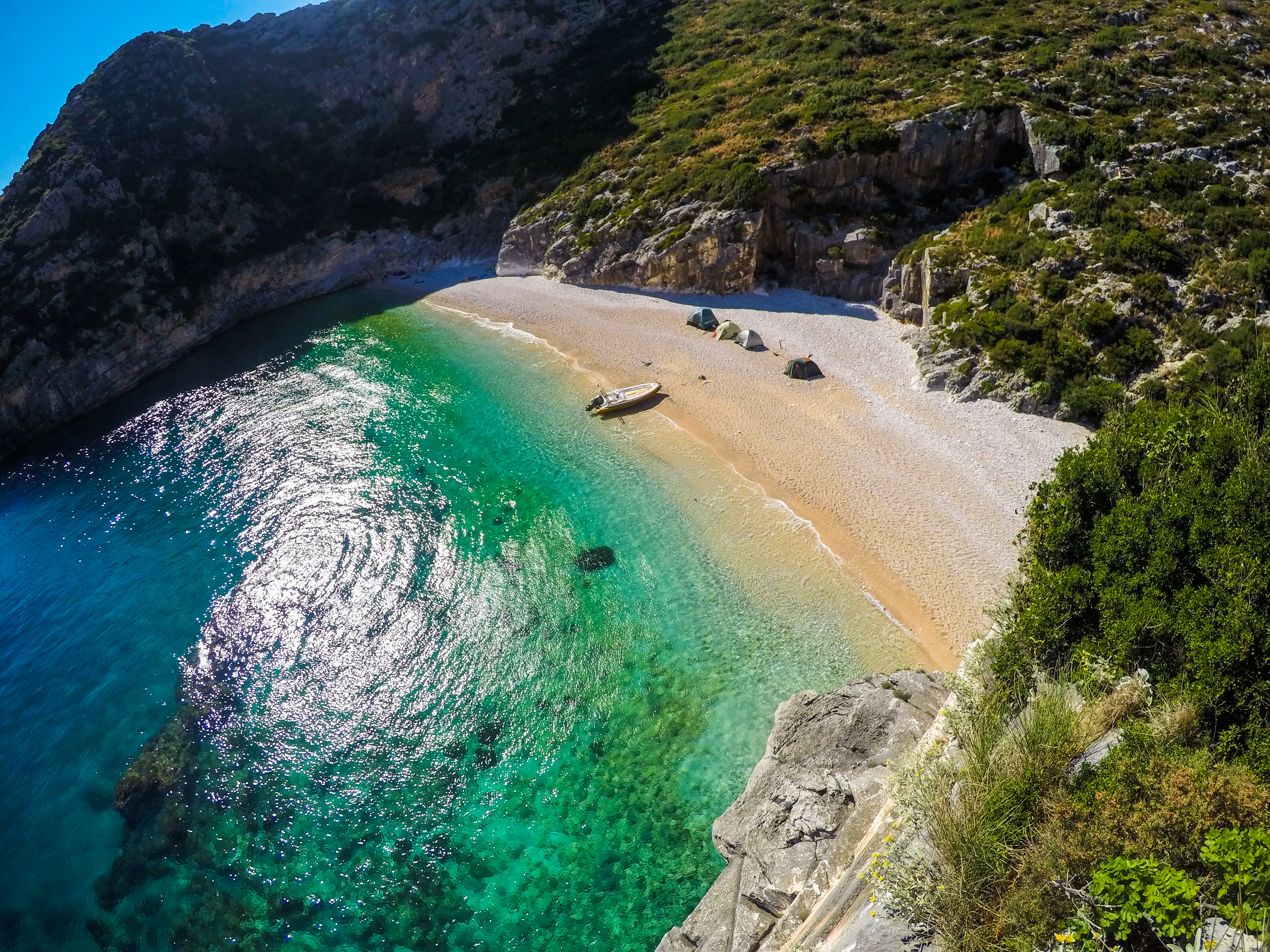
Bay of Grama

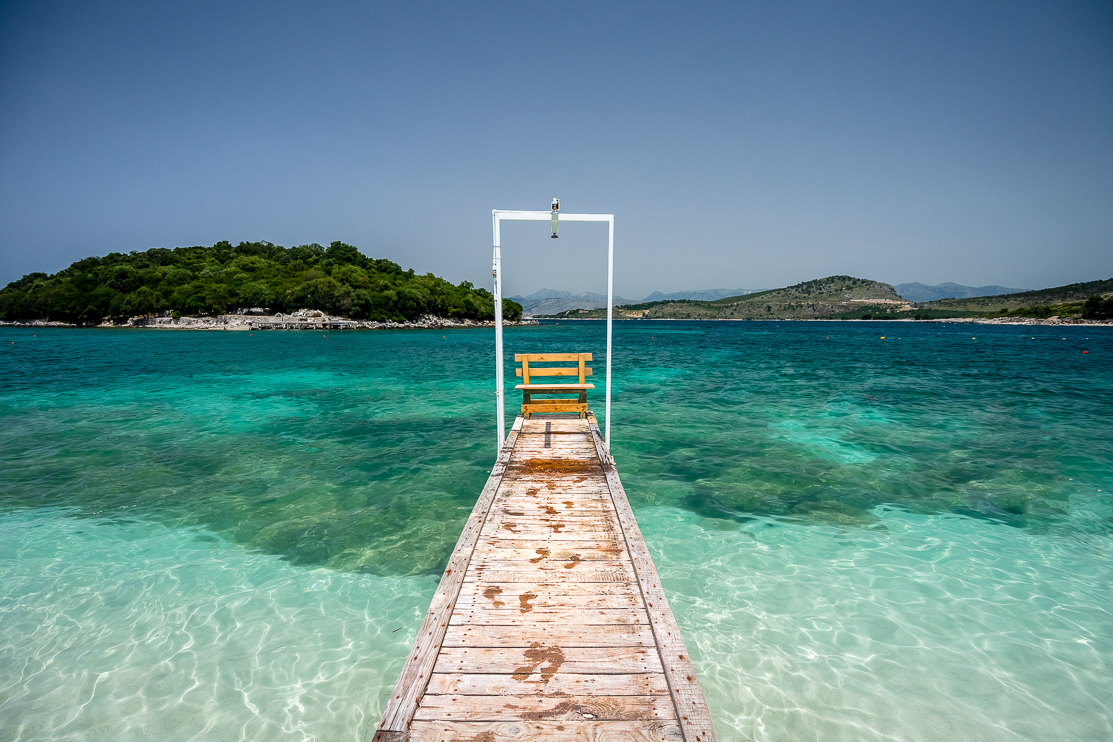
Ksamil

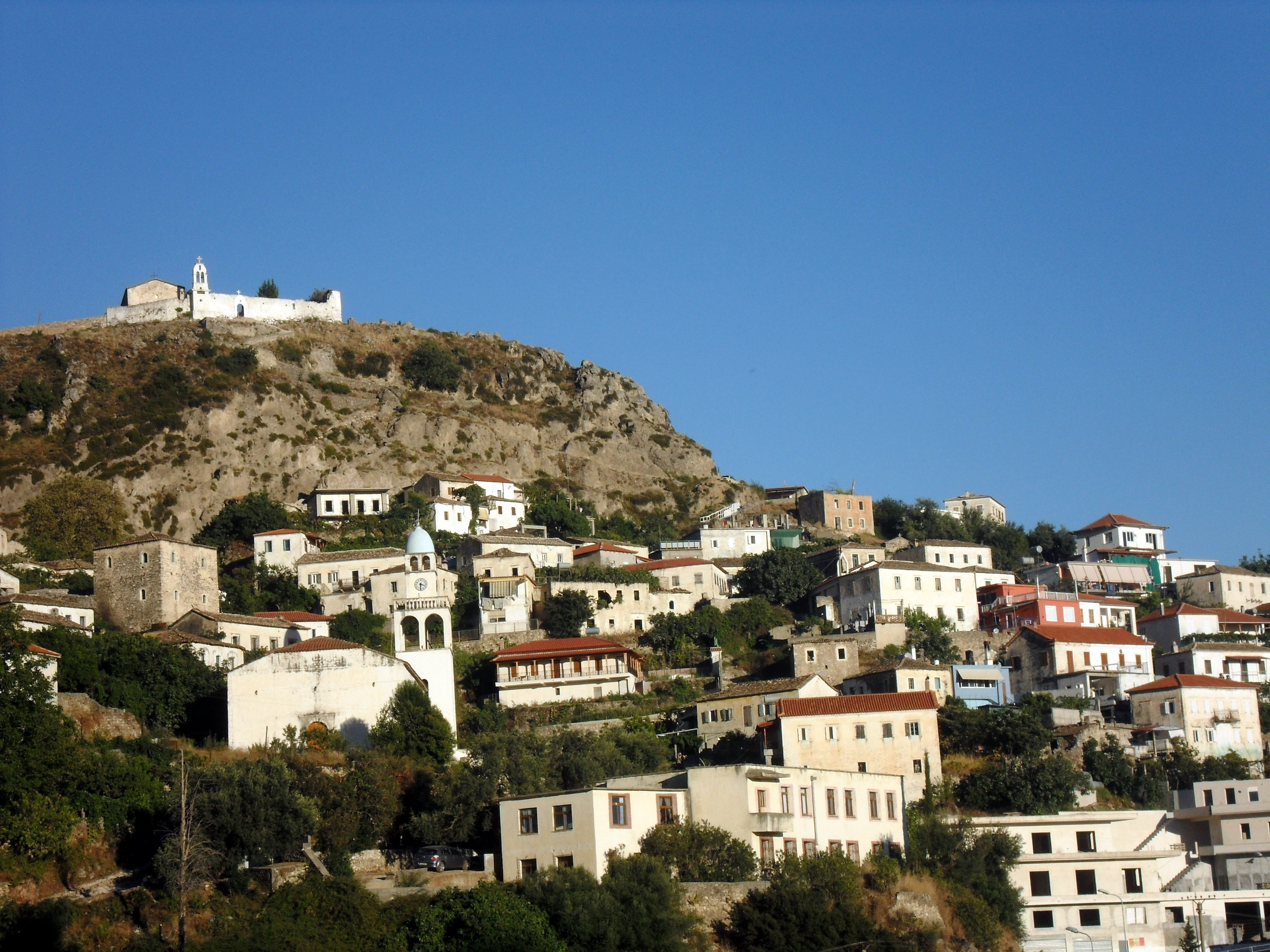
Dhërmi

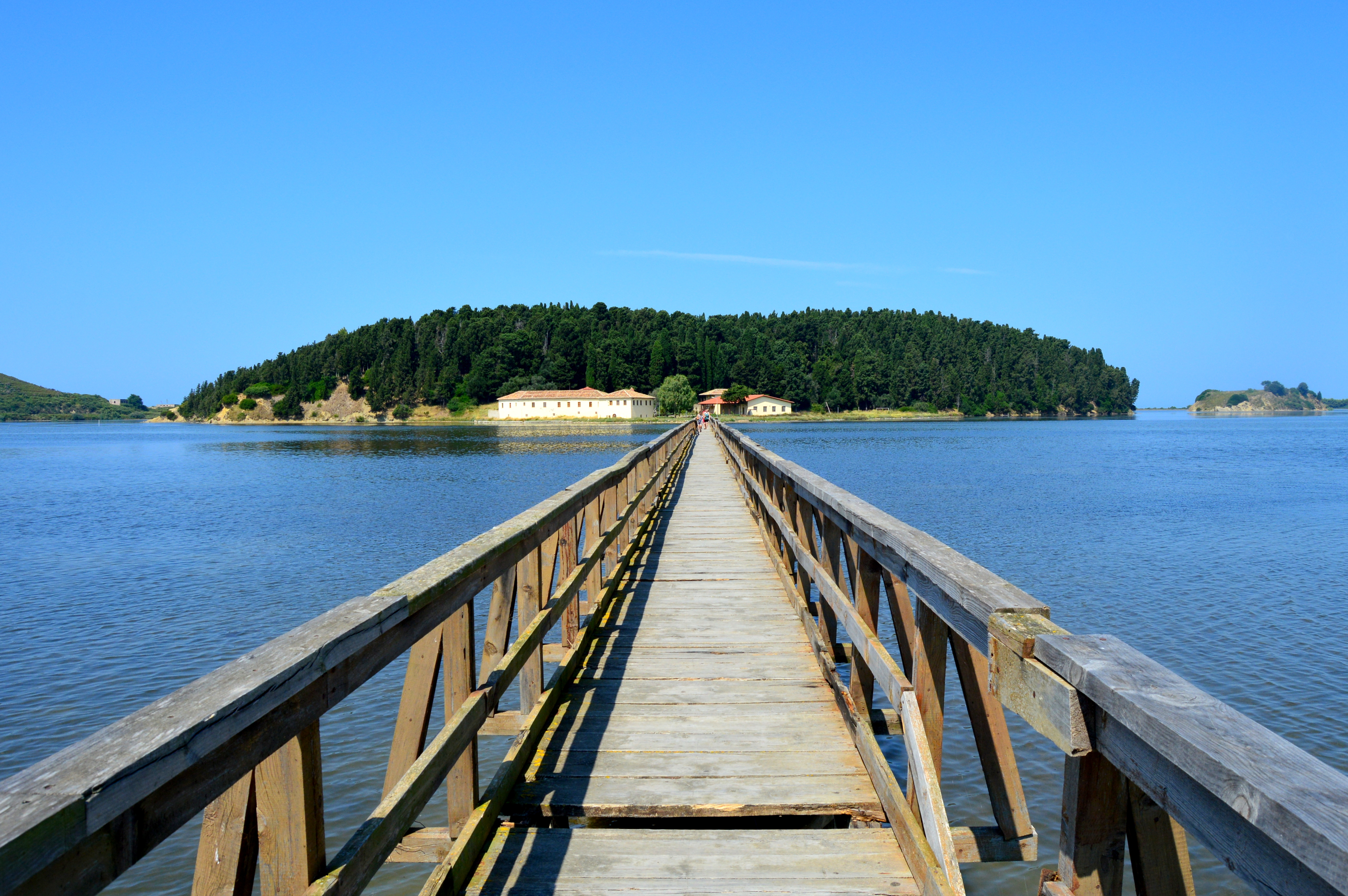
Zvernec Island

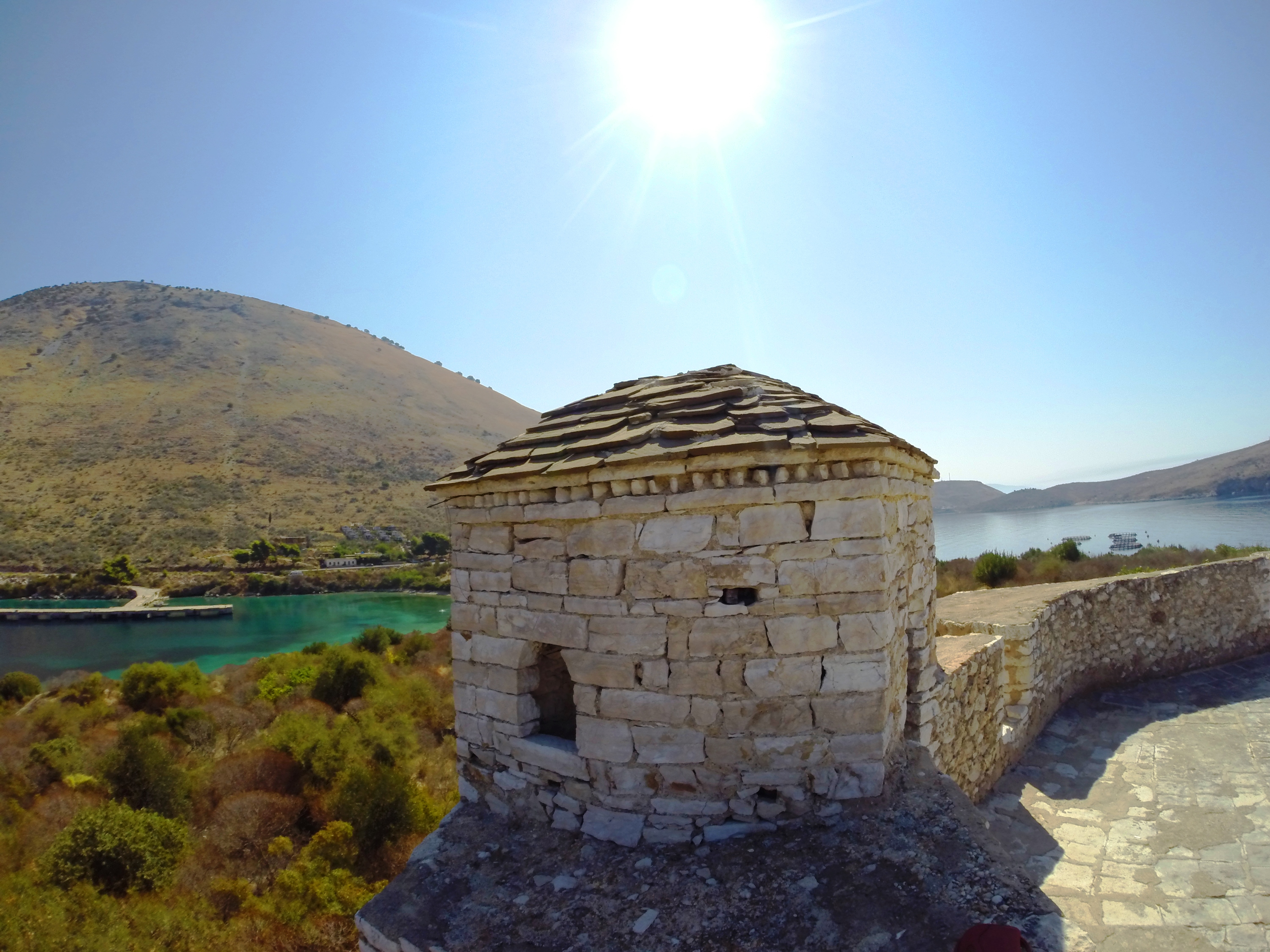
Porto Palermo

- Sarandë is one of the most important tourist attractions of the Albanian Riviera. Near the city are the remains of the ancient city of Butrint.
- Ksamil is one of the most frequented coastal resorts by both domestic and foreign tourists. The Ksamil Islands are a small archipelago just off the coast of the village bearing the same name.
- Dhërmi is built on a slope of the Ceraunian Mountains at approximately 200 meters in altitude. The coastal area has seen a boom in the construction of accommodation facilities, such as wooden villa complexes and modern boutique hotels. In addition, it is considered a nightlife destination.
- Canyon of Gjipe, located in between Iljas and Vuno can only be reached by hiking from the Monastery of St. Theodore.
- Borsh is the largest beach on the Ionian sea (7 km). Tourism here is still developing and there are a handful of small hotels and guesthouses.
- Himara, has long white sandy beaches and the few hills close to the sea are terraced and planted with olive and citrus trees. Above is the Old Town which features a castle and some fortified stone houses.
- Qeparo is situated on the western slope of Mount Gjivlash, at about 450 metres (1,480 ft) above sea level and is split up into two settlements. Old Qeparo crowns the hilltop overlooking acres of olive groves and the sea. The new settlement climbs the hillside above the beach. Many of the houses have steps that lead directly to the beach. A couple of hotels and a few guesthouses provide accommodations. A new seaside promenade was recently constructed and is popular with families in the evenings.
- Palasë is a village close to the Llogara National Park and also a very popular destination for foreign tourists. On 4 January 48 BCE during his pursuit of Pompey, Julius Caesar landed in Palasë.
- Lukovë is a village Vlorë County with great beaches and olive groves planted on terraced hillsides.
- Piqeras village is the birthplace of the Albanian national hero Vasil Laçi who attempted to assassinate Victor Emmanuel III, King of Italy and Shefqet Bej Vërlaci, Prime Minister of Albania after the occupation of Albania by fascist Italy.
- Karaburun Peninsula is the only national marine park of Albania. The Karaburun Peninsula is completely undeveloped and offers an abundance of hiking opportunities. A part of the Mountains is designated as a national park which is rich in wildlife, including deer, foxes, wild boars and even wolves.
- Jalë is known for its nightlife. The Folie Marina is located in Jalë.
- Llaman, is known for the gravel beaches with deep, clear waters.
- Zvërnec Island is an island within the Narta Lagoon. The island is a tourist attraction because it contains the well preserved 13th century Byzantine Zvërnec Monastery.
- Porto Palermo Castle is a castle situated in the bay of Porto Palermo. Huffington Post ranked Porto Palermo first among 15 Undiscovered European Destinations for 2014.
- Butrint was an ancient city and is protected under UNESCO as a World Heritage Site.

== National parks ==
The Llogara National Park is known from its vibrant flora and fauna with over 100 different types of wild animals and birds including: deer, wild cats, foxes, etc. The mixture of refreshing high altitude mountain air and proximity of the sea makes it very attractive destination for tourists. The area is also important for the growth of eco-tourism, picnic, hiking and air sports.

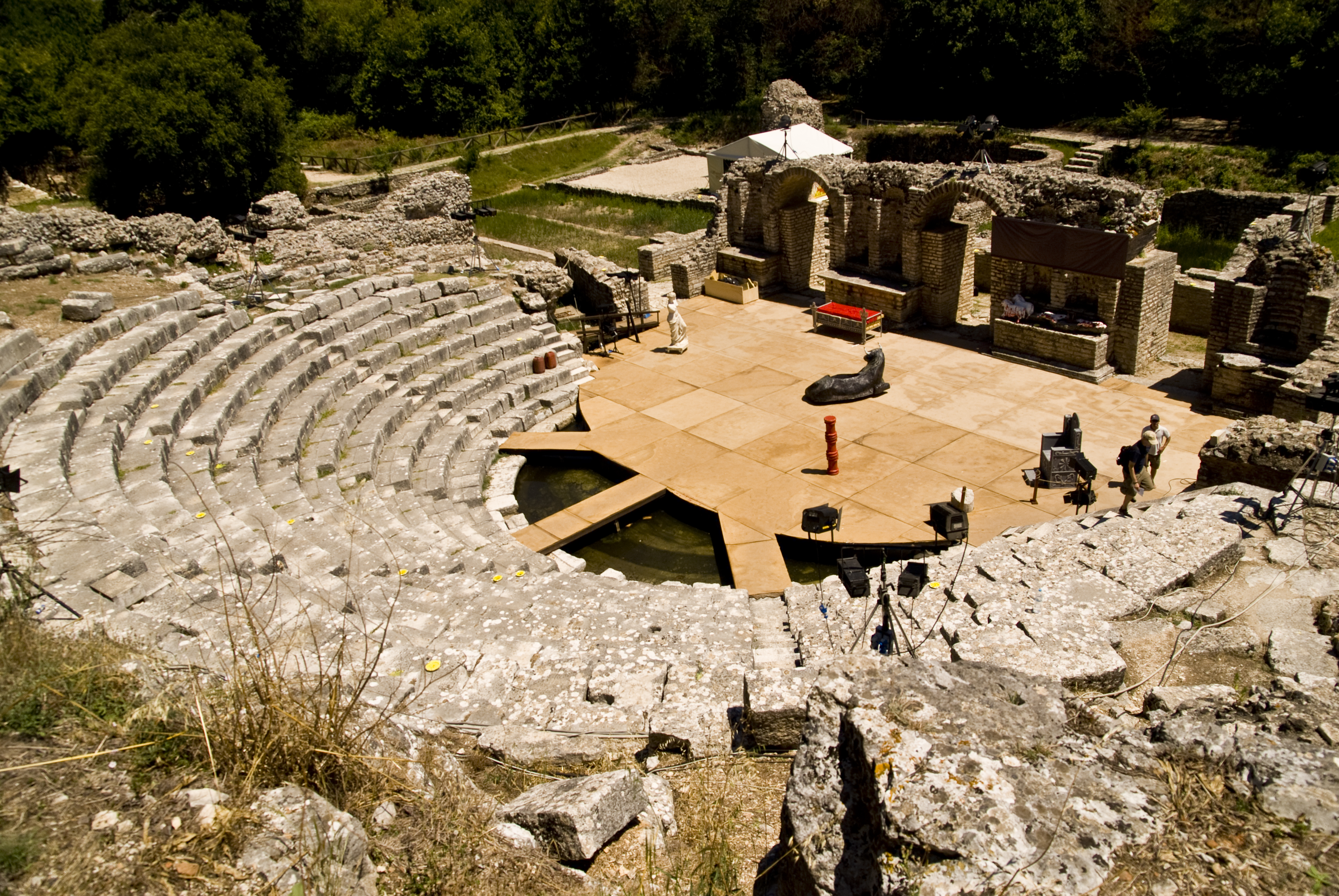
Ancient Theatre in Butrint (Butrint National Park)

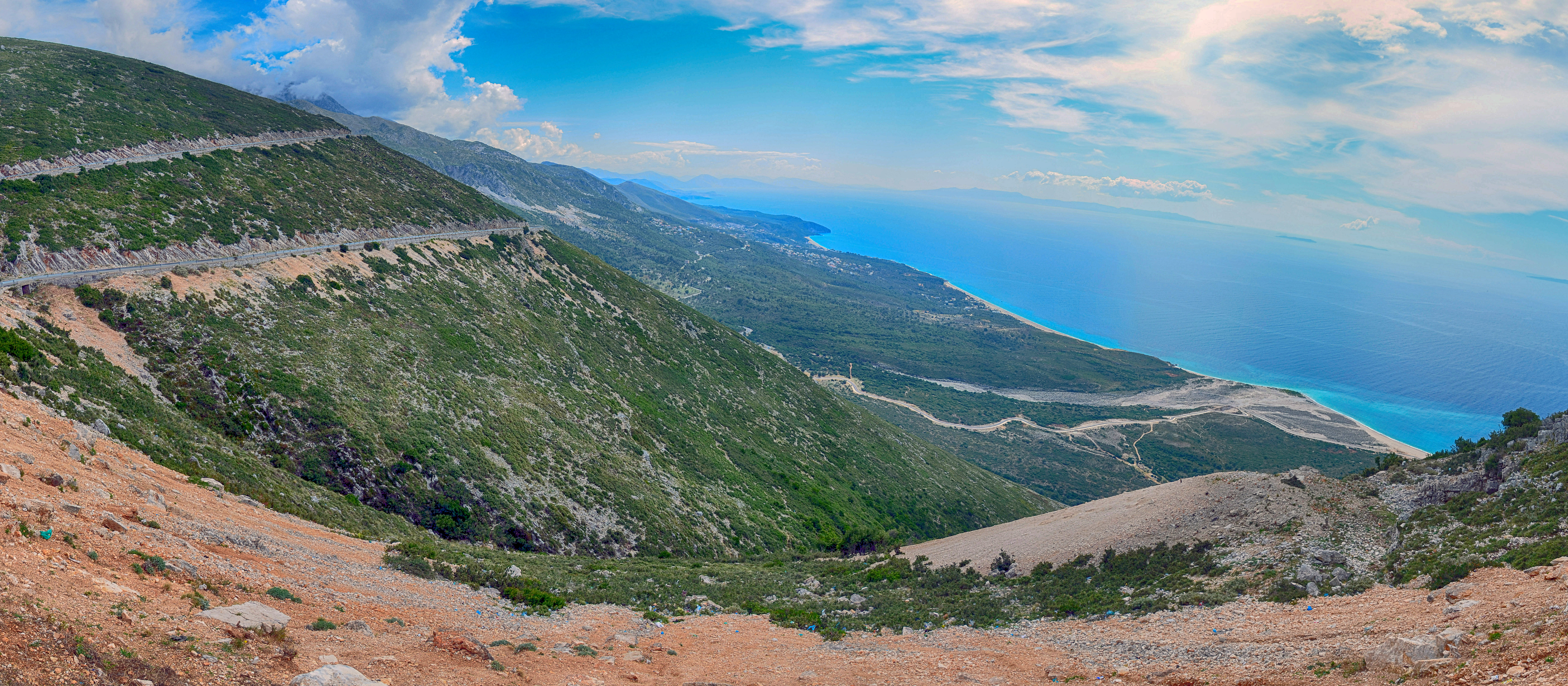
Llogara Pass (National Park of Llogara)

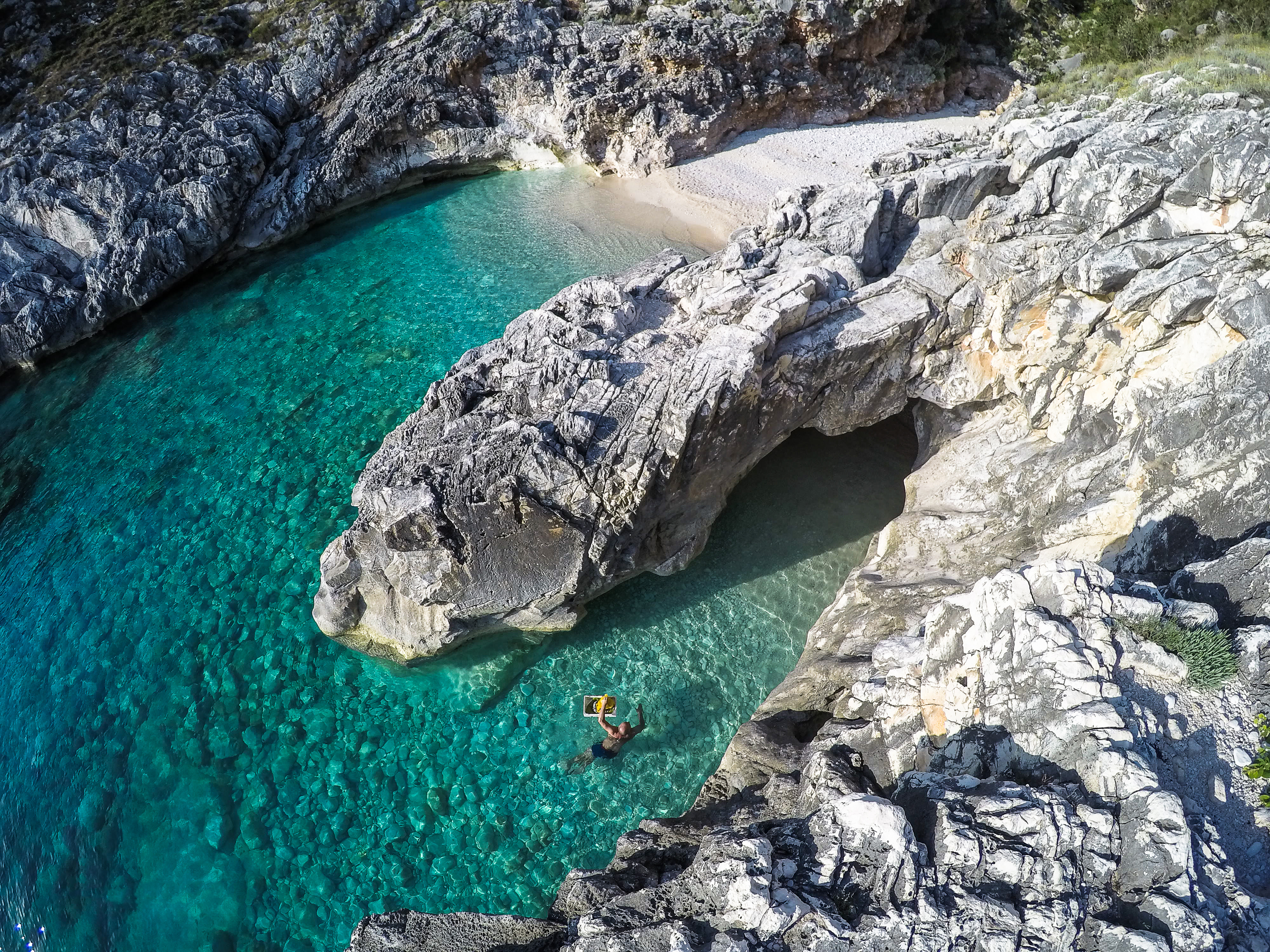
Bay of Skaloma (Karaburun-Sazan Marine Park)

== Castles ==
The Ali Pasha Castle was named after Ali Pasha of Tepelenë, who resided there until 1820. The current fortress was rebuilt in 1819 from its surface with 3 towers. Until 1820, it was the second residence of Ali Pasha. The castle described and pictured is popularly known as The Triangular Fortress. Built under Venetian dominion in the late 15th or early 16th century, it provided a stronghold for the Venetians on Corfu to exploit fishing, grazing, olives and timber in and around Butrint. The Borsh Castle is also known as the Castle of Sopot by the name of the hill on which it is located.

Lëkurësi Castle is located on a strategic hill point overlooking the horseshoe bay of Sarandë. From here one can view the entire town as well as the islands of Ksamil, Corfu Island and the Butrint Lagoon.

Porto Palermo Castle located a few kilometers south of Himarë in southern Albania. It is situated in the bay of Porto Palermo. Huffington Post ranked Porto Palermo first among 15 Undiscovered European Destinations for 2014.

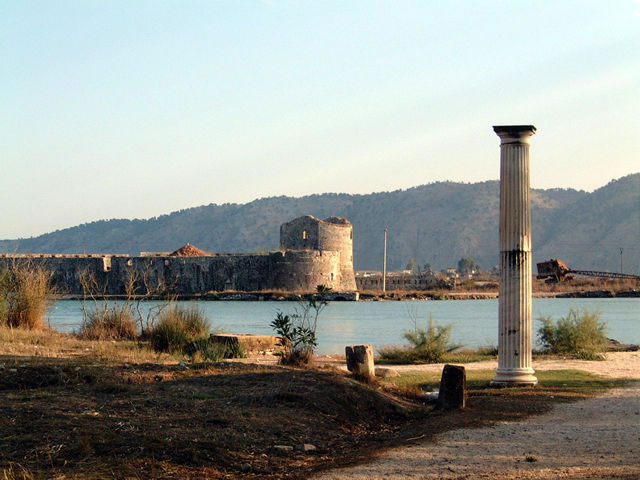
Ali Pasha Castle in Butrint

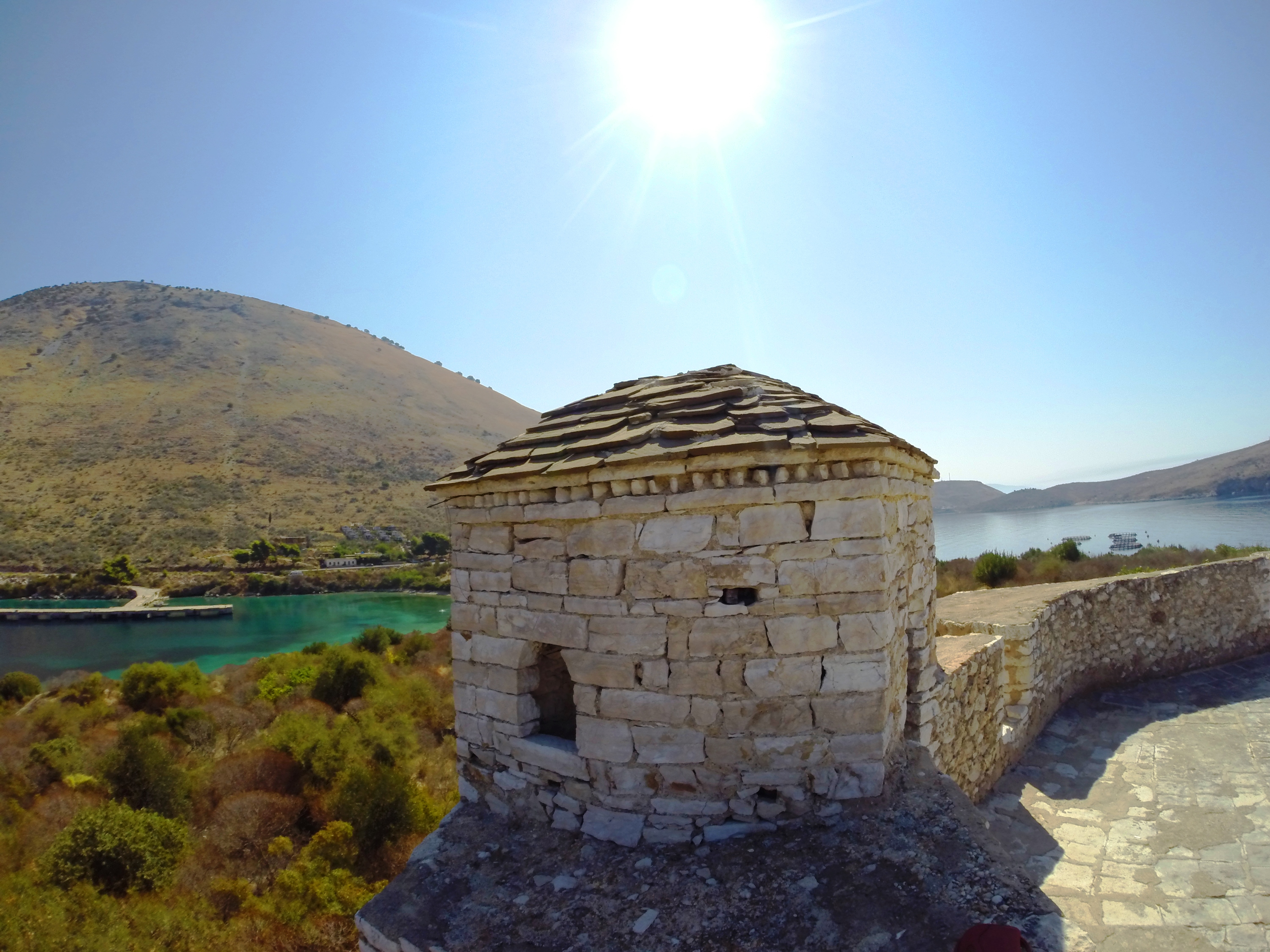
Porto Palermo Castle

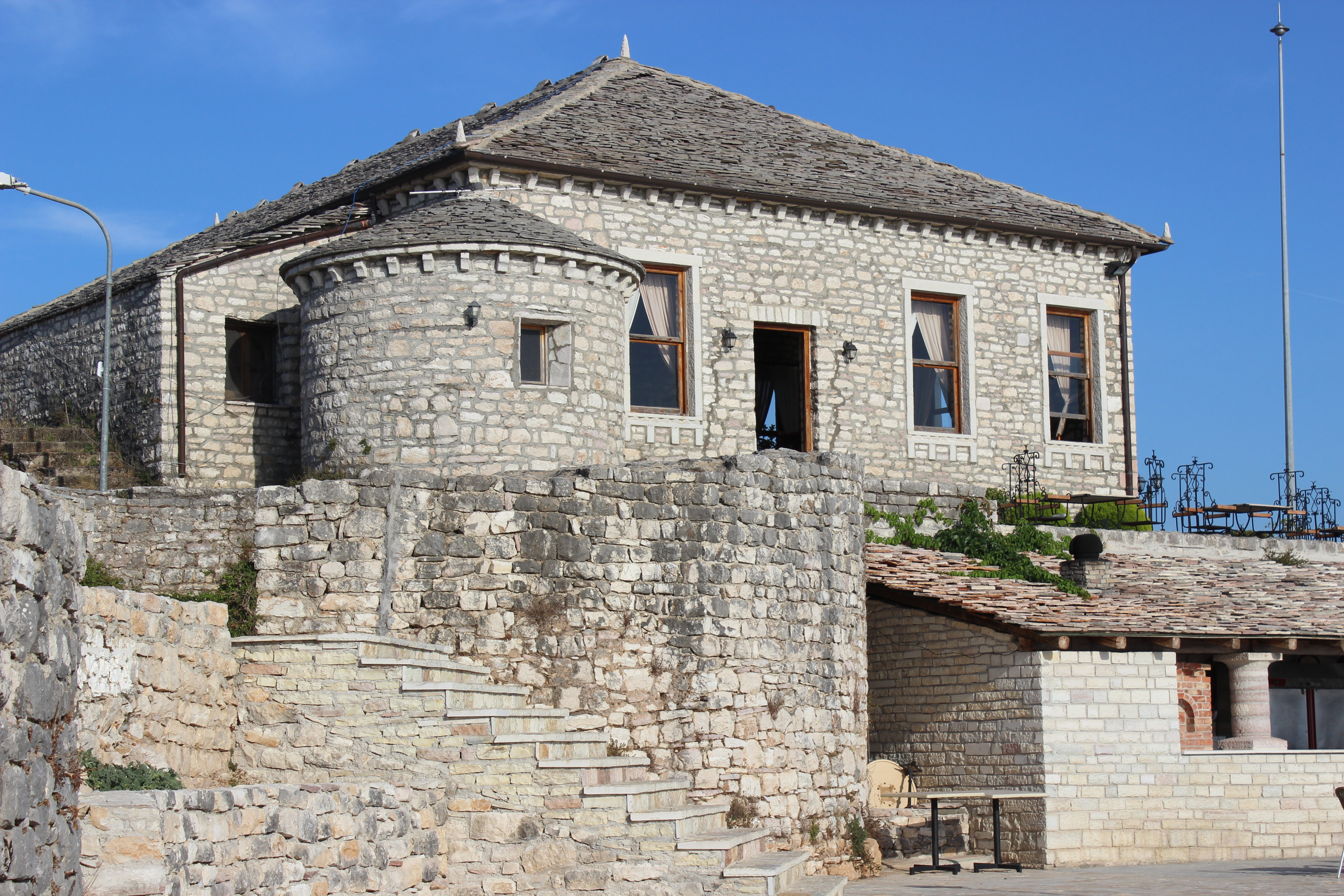
Lëkurësi Castle

== See also ==
- Ceraunian Mountains
- Albanian Adriatic Sea Coast
- Geography of Albania
- Tourism in Albania
- Dear Albania
