= Piqeras =

- Village
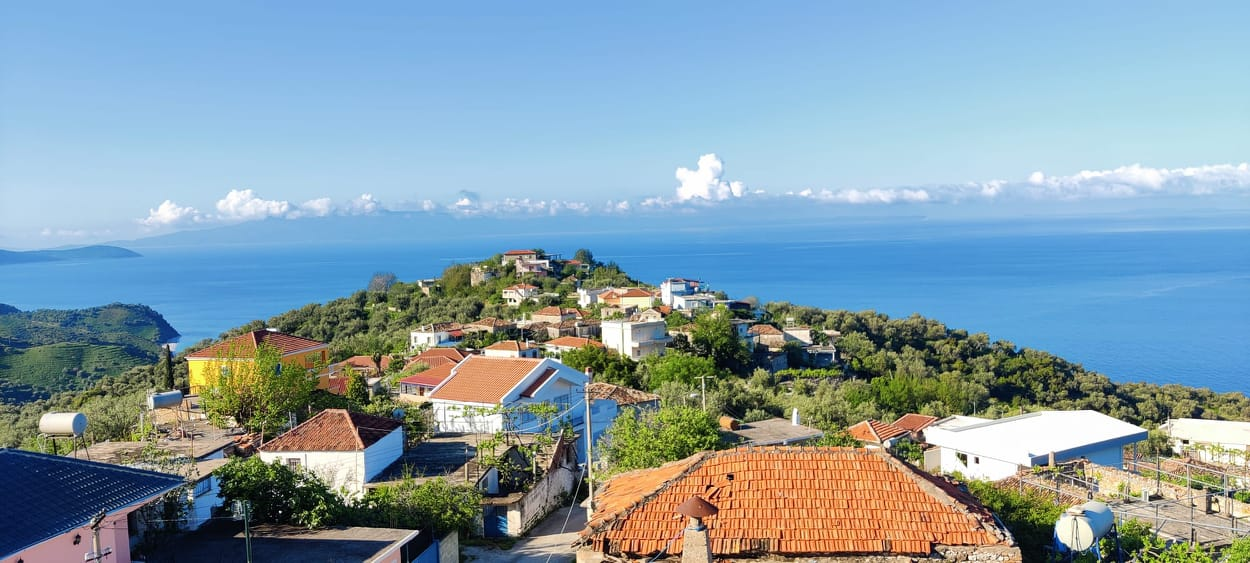
- Overview of Piqeras

- Location within Albania
- Coordinates: 40°0′59″N 19°53′33″E
- Country: Albania
- County: Vlorë
- Municipality: Himarë
- Administrative unit: Lukovë
- Time zone: UTC+1 (CET)
  - Summer (DST): UTC+2 (CEST)

Piqeras (Albanian definite form: Piqerasi) is a village in the former municipality of Lukovë, Vlorë County, southern Albania. At the 2015 local government reform it became part of the municipality Himarë.

== Demographics ==
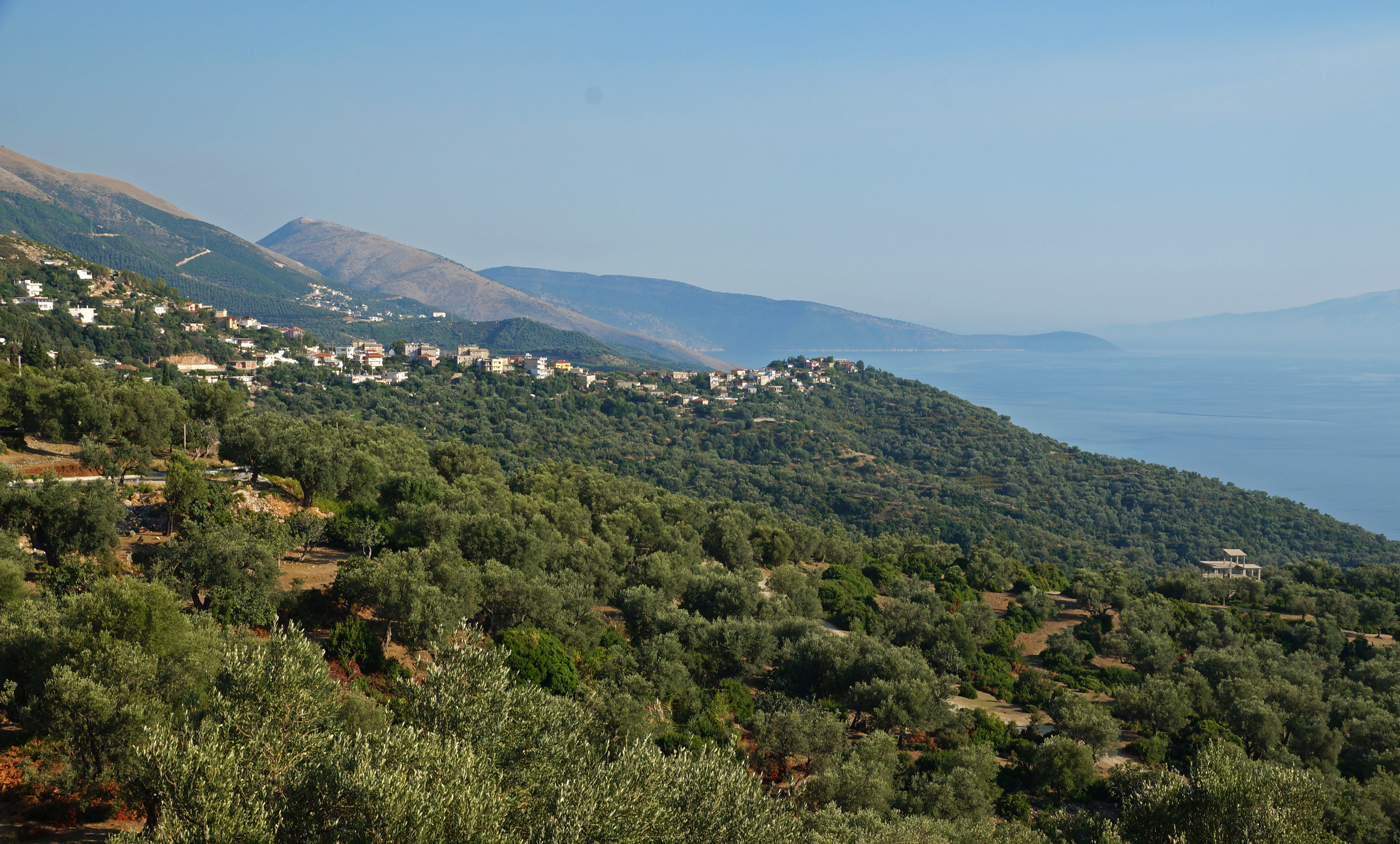
The village of Piqeras and the Albanian Riviera

In fieldwork conducted in 1992, Piqeras had a total population of 991, of which 941 were Albanians. Piqeras is inhabited by an Orthodox Albanian majority with a minority of 100 Muslim Albanians and 50 Greeks.

== History ==
During the Ottoman period, Piqeras, together with nearby Lukovë and Nivicë, was a part of the Himara area and enjoyed special semi-autonomous status inside this community.

The Arbëresh missionary Giuseppe Schirò wrote in 1722 that Piqeras was inhabited by ethnic Albanians.

In 1743-44, Piqeras which was Christian at the time was attacked by villagers of Borsh with assistance from Fterrë and Çorraj, most of which had converted to Islam about 50 years earlier. The attack was likely linked to village boundaries related to agricultural land and grazing grounds. During the attack, more than 20 of the attackers were killed in an ambush and many families from Piqeras were forced to leave the village to avoid retaliation. Between 1744-1748, they first fled to Venetian Corfu and then reached a deal which allowed them to settle in part of Rosciano which became known as Villa Badessa (Albanian: Badhesa). The village is still Albanian-speaking since its foundation and it is one of the settlements where Albanian is an officially recognized language in Italy. Several local families remained in Piqeras after 1744: Vovlataj, Xhanaj, Spiraj, Zahaj, Ndreraj, Kondaj and possibly the Çunaj, who might be a pre-1744 family or a later arrival. The descendants of these families form the locals of Piqeras today along with a few families from Kallarat and Çorraj which settled later in the village.

In 1798 the village became the target of an attack by the forces of Ali Pasha who managed to control the southern part of Himara. In 1875, some Albanian speaking families with Piqeras heritage from Villa Badessa decided to relocate to Nea Pikerni, a settlement founded by the Greek state in the Peloponnese which after some time was abandoned due to economic and relocation hardships.

A Greek school was operating in Piqeras from 1871. Greek education was sponsored by the local diaspora and in 1902-1904 it was expanded with a girls' and a middle level school.

The village is the birthplace of the Albanian national hero Vasil Laçi who attempted to assassinate Victor Emmanuel III, King of Italy and Shefqet Bej Vërlaci, Prime Minister of Albania after the occupation of Albania by fascist Italy.

== Notable people ==
- Vasil Laçi, Albanian patriot and anti-monarchist
