= Iljas =

- Village
- Location within Albania
- Coordinates: 40°8′34″N 19°40′16″E
- Country: Albania
- County: Vlorë
- Municipality: Himarë
- Administrative unit: Himarë
- Time zone: UTC+1 (CET)
  - Summer (DST): UTC+2 (CEST)

Iljas (Albanian definite form: Iljasi; Albanian pronunciation: [iˈljas] or [iˈljasi]) is a village in Himarë municipality (13 kilometres from the town), Vlorë County, southern Albania. It is located near the Ionian coast on the Albanian Riviera.

== Demographics ==
The village of Iljas is inhabited by an Eastern Orthodox Albanian population.

== History ==
In 1720, the villages of Himara, Palasë, Ilias, Vuno, Pilur and Qeparo refused to submit to the Pasha of Delvina. In 1722, the Italian-Arberëshë missionary Giuseppe Schirò, wrote that Albanians inhabited Ilias.
