= Pilur =

- Village
- Location within Albania
- Coordinates: 40°7′43″N 19°46′30″E
- Country: Albania
- County: Vlorë
- Municipality: Himarë
- Administrative unit: Himarë
- Time zone: UTC+1 (CET)
  - Summer (DST): UTC+2 (CEST)

Pilur is a village on the Albanian Riviera in Vlorë County, Albania. It is part of the Himarë municipality.

== Demographics ==
The village of Pilur is inhabited exclusively by an Albanian-speaking Orthodox Albanian population.

== History ==
In 1720, the villages of Himarë, Palasë, Iljas, Vuno, Pilur and Qeparo refused to submit to the Pasha of Delvinë.
