= Jakup Mato =

Albanian publicist, educational administrator and lector

Jakup Halil Mato (16 September 1934 in Fterra, Albania – 30 August 2005 in Tirana, Albania) was an Albanian publicist, educational administrator and lector of Tirana University. He started publishing his articles and research studies in the field of literature and arts since the beginning of the 1960s. In the 1990s he served as head of Centre of Art Studies of the Academy of Sciences of Albania.

== Biography ==
After attending the former French Lyceum in Gjirokastra, Mato was a teacher and principal in the southern Albanian village of Kuç near Vlora. In 1959 he graduated from the University of Tirana.

He was editor in chief of the newspaper 'Mesuesi'. Until the 1970s, he worked first at the Pedagogical Institute and then as a head of department in the Ministry of Culture and Education. Mato was then editor-in-chief of the newspaper "Mësuesi" (The Teacher) and was involved in the artistic field. Among other things, Jakup Mato was director of the Art Academy in Tirana Instituti i Lartë i Arteve, today the University of Arts Tirana. Twice, from 1991 to 1993 and from 1997 to 1998, he was director of the Arts Research Center (Qendra per Studimin e Arteve) at the Albanian Academy of Sciences. For many years Mato was a lecturer at the University of Tirana and at the Academy of Arts in the subject of aesthetics. He was also Commissioner of the Encyclopaedia of Albanian Arts.

== Books ==
- "New trends in Albanian literature" Risi të letersisë shqipe, Naim Frasheri Publishing House, 1983, Bib.m+v 891983.01
- "Paradox of the humor and satire" Paradokset e satirës dhe të humorit, Toena Publishing House, 2000, ISBN 99927-1-267-8 / 9992712678
- "Images, codes, traditions" Imazhe, kode, kumte, Albanian Academy of Sciences, 2001, ISBN 99927-761-8-8 / 9992776188
- "In the footsteps of the pre-professional art" Rrjedhave të artit paraprofesionist, Albanian Academy of Sciences, 2004, ISBN 99943-614-2-2
- "Poetics of drama and aesthetic thoughts" Poetika e dramaturgjisë dhe mendimi estetik, Albanian Academy of Sciences, 2005, ISBN 9789994376322

== Article ==
- "Misioni anglez ne Fterre" (British mission in Fterra) gazeta "Fterra jonë" Nr 2 korrik viti 2001
- The cultural paradoxes and the influneces on emigrants live. Krahu i shqiponjës, 15. Februar 2008 (Artikel online)

== Articles in foreign language ==
- "Folklordaki mizah ve hiciv artistik araclarinin niteligi” bei IV Milleterasi tuerk halk kueltuerue kongresi program ve bildiri oezetleri Ankara Turqi 1991 f 77
- "Emigrants involved in approaching and opposing attitudes to the albanian and italinan cultures në www.afcr-al.org
- "The cultural paradoxes and the influneces on emigrants live"(About the book of Dr. Zyhdi Dervishi, "The crossed glimpses on the sea Krahu i shqiponjës 2008
