= Muzafer Korkuti =

Albanian archaeologist and prehistorian

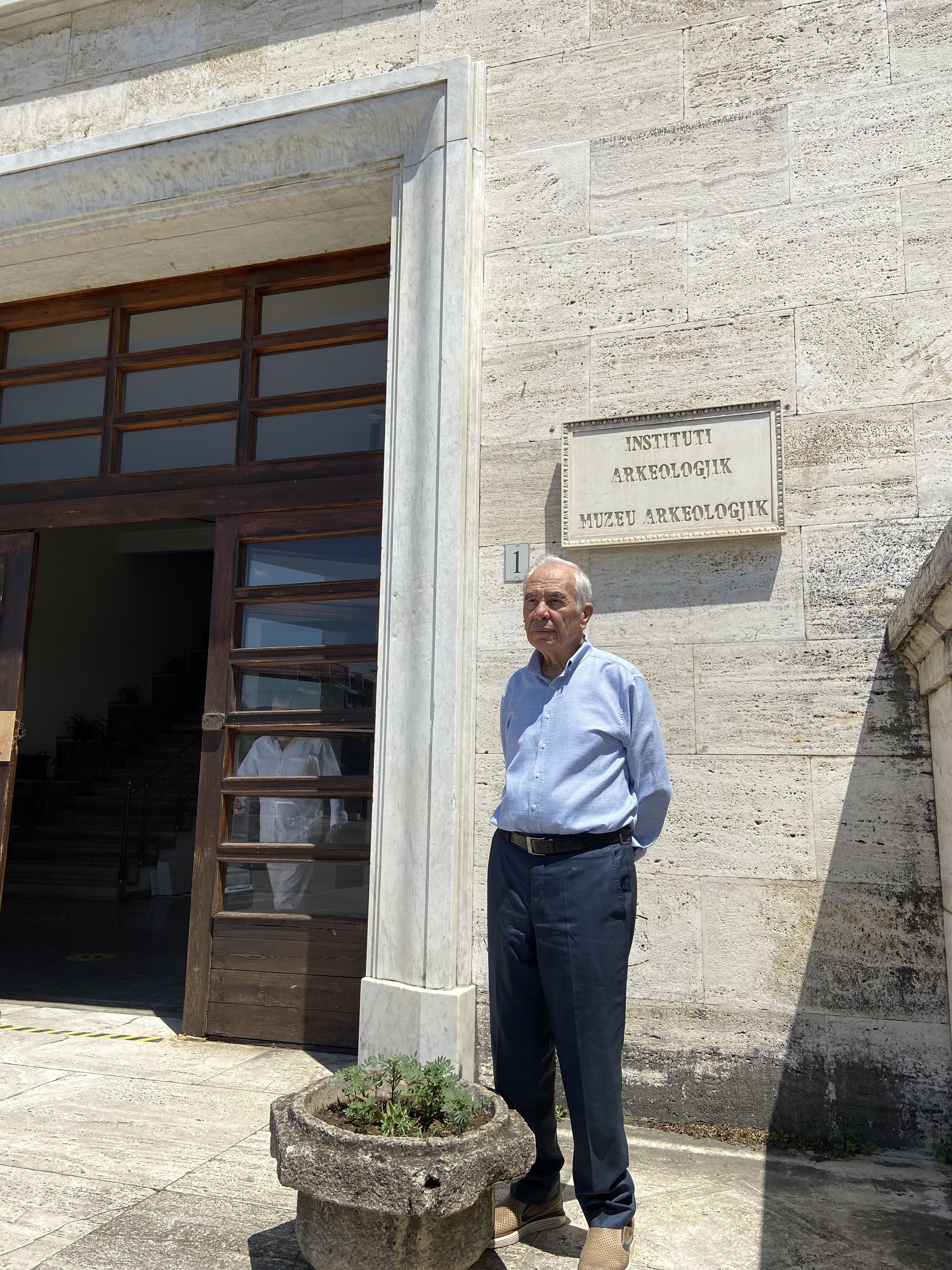
- Born: 17 May 1936; Fterrë, Albanian Kingdom
- Education: University of Tirana
- Occupations: Archaeologist, prehistorian
- Known for: Albanian prehistoric archaeology
- Notable work: Studies on Neolithic and Chalcolithic Albania
- Spouse: Adelina Korkuti
- Children: 2

Muzafer Korkuti (born 17 May 1936) is an Albanian archaeologist and prehistorian, regarded as one of the most influential scholars in the study of Albania’s prehistoric past. His academic work has focused primarily on the Neolithic, Chalcolithic and early Bronze Age periods, contributing significantly to the understanding of prehistoric settlements, material culture and continuity in the Western Balkans.

== Early life and education ==
Korkuti was born in the village of Fterrë, in southern Albania. He completed his primary and secondary education in southern Albania and Shkodër before enrolling at the University of Tirana, where he studied history between 1957 and 1962. He later specialized in archaeology through advanced studies abroad, including training in the Soviet Union and China. In 1978, he was awarded a Doctoral Science degree for his research on prehistoric and protohistoric matters in Albania.

== Career ==
Following his studies, Korkuti joined the Institute of Archaeology in Tirana, where he spent the majority of his professional career. He led and participated in numerous archaeological excavations across the country, with particular emphasis on prehistoric sites such as Maliq and other key Neolithic and Chalcolithic settlements.

From the early 1990s, he was involved in international research collaborations, including joint Albanian–American excavations at the Konispol Cave. He served multiple terms as Director of the Institute of Archaeology and later headed the Institute within the Centre for Albanological Studies. Alongside his research work, Korkuti taught archaeology at the University of Tirana and lectured at academic institutions in Europe and the United States.

== Research and contributions ==
Korkuti’s scholarly output includes monographs, excavation reports and numerous academic articles addressing prehistoric chronology, settlement patterns and cultural development in Albania. His research has played an important role in establishing the scientific framework for Albanian prehistoric archaeology and integrating it into broader Balkan and Mediterranean studies.

== Honors ==
In recognition of his contributions to science and national heritage, Korkuti has received several high state decorations, including the title Honor of the Nation.

== Selected works ==
- Parailirët, ilirët, arbërit: histori e shkurtër (2003)
- Qytetërimi neolitik dhe eneolitik në Shqipëri (2010)
- Archeological studies on the prehistory of Albania (2013)
- Etnogjeneza e Ilirëve (2016)
- L'Albanie archéologique (1971)
- Dardania: Kërkime dhe studime arkeologjike (2015)
- Arti shkëmbor në Shqipëri (2008)
- A propos de la formation de l'ethnie-illyrienne (1972)
