= Nafiz Bezhani =

Albanian judge

Nafiz Bezhani (1928–2004) was an Albanian jurist, politician and writer.

== Life ==
Born in 1928 in Fterrë, southern Albania, and was educated at the Faculty of Law of the University of Tirana. In 1943 he joined the National Liberation Movement and was elected a delegate of the First Council of the Anti-fascist Youth in August 1944. After the 1956 conference of the Party of Labour of Albania he was expelled from the party.

In 1992 he became a member of the Court of Cassation and in 1997 head of the Verification Committee of the Parliament of Albania, which was responsible for finding out possible agents of the Sigurimi that held political and judicial offices in post-Communist Albania.
