= Vasil Laçi =

Albanian patriot and anti-monarchist

- Vasil Laçi on police photo before execution
- Born: 15 September 1922; Piqeras, Principality of Albania
- Died: 27 May 1941 (aged 18); Tirana, Italian-occupied Albania
- Cause of death: Execution by hanging
- Known for: An attempt to kill in 1941 Victor Emmanuel III, then King of Italy and Shefqet Bej Vërlaci, then Prime Minister of Albania
- Awards: Hero of the People

Vasil Laçi, also referred to as Vasil Llaçi (15 September 1922 – 27 May 1941), was an Albanian patriot and anti-monarchist who attempted to kill Victor Emmanuel III, King of Italy and Shefqet Bej Vërlaci, Prime Minister of Albania after the occupation of Albania by fascist Italy.

== Early life ==
Vasil Laçi was born in the village of Piqeras in southern Albania near the city of Sarandë on 15 September 1922, son of Mihal Laçi and Vitori. His father died at the age of 30, while Vasil was still a child. He spent his childhood in Piqeras, where he studied in the local elementary school. In 1933-1935 he worked in Durrës as a stevedore. In 1936 he moved to Tirana, capital of Albania, after being invited to work there. The Italian invasion found him in Tirana. There he developed relations with patriotic groups, and helped several of their members escape from the Italian troops and police. He worked initially as a dishwasher, and later as a servant. His cousin Kolë Llaçi was member of the Communist Group of Korçë (where he had migrated) and died in September 1941 in the prison of Voskopojë after being arrested by the Italians. The Fascist military reports states that "Llaçi had communist ideas and he had been in contact with communist literature".

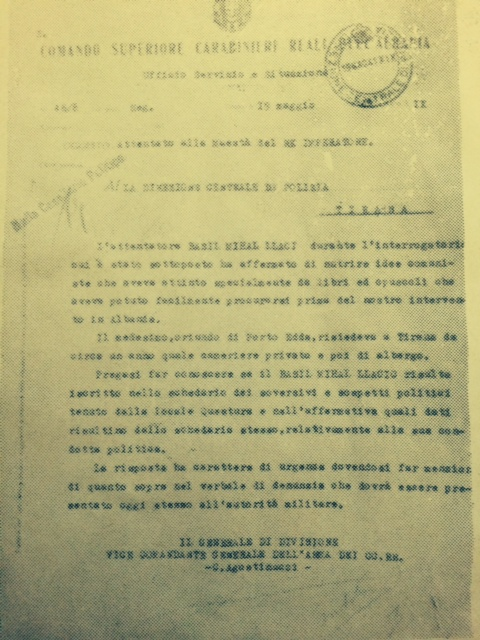
Document of Fascist military authorities, accusing Vasil Laçi as a communist. Full name appears as Vasil Mihal Llaçi.

== Assassination attempt against Victor Emmanuel III ==
Victor Emmanuel III decided to visit Albania on 12 April 1941 and he arrived one month later, after being reassured by the Italian fascist police of Tirana that all security measures had been taken. Laçi found out about Victor Emmanuel's visit to Albania 15 days before his arrival on 2 May 1941. He got a job at the Hotel International where Victor Emmanuel would stay, and borrowed a Beretta M1915 pistol from Pëllumb Koka, another Albanian patriot. On 17 May 1941 the 18-year-old Laçi, wearing an Albanian national costume, attacked the car in which Victor Emmanuel and Shefqet Bej Vërlaci, Prime Minister of Albania were travelling accompanied by the ministers of the government. He fired four shots towards them while shouting "Long live Albania! Down with fascism", but failed to hit anyone. After the assassination attempt, the Italian sources in Rome accused Greece of being behind Laçi and called him a "Greek-Macedonian named Mihailoff Vasillaci" (di origine grecomacedone).

== Aftermath and legacy ==
Laçi was arrested immediately and executed by hanging ten days later. The Italian fascist government attributed his attack to economic issues he had with Shefqet Bej Vërlaci, to prevent possible uprisings of the Albanian people.

Laçi was one of the first people to posthumously receive the People's Hero of Albania award from the Albanian government. His assassination attempt was documented in a book, which was adapted for the 1980 movie Bullets for the Imperator (Albanian: Plumba Perandorit). A monument to Laçi stands in Tirana.
