= Fterrë =

- Village
- Location within Albania
- Coordinates: 40°6′51″N 19°53′36″E
- Country: Albania
- County: Vlorë
- Municipality: Himarë
- Administrative unit: Lukovë

Area
  - Total: 37 km^{2} (14 sq mi)
- Elevation: 225 m (738 ft)

Population
  - Total: 168
  - Density: 4.5/km^{2} (12/sq mi)
- Time zone: UTC+1 (CET)
  - Summer (DST): UTC+2 (CEST)

Fterrë (Albanian definite form: Fterra) is a village in the former commune of Lukovë, Vlorë County, southern Albania. At the 2015 local government reform it became part of the municipality Himarë. It is located in a side valley of the Albanian Riviera, within the region of Kurvelesh and 10 km northeast of Borsh. The village is inhabited by Muslim Albanians.

== Geography ==
Fterrë is located 200 to 250 m above sea level on the western slope of Mt Lajthi (1418 m). The highest peak of the village's area is that Gjeshnikoshi (1478 m) and the lowest that of Leka (315 m). There are also numerous karst springs and six caves. A road from Borsh to Vlorë passes through the village.

== History ==
Fterrë was first mentioned in 1431, in the Sûreti defter-i sancak-i Arvanid (defter of the Albanian Sanjak). At that time, it consisted of twelve – affluent – families. In 1583, the Ottoman Defter mentioned the place as Ifteran with 24 extended families and in later years is listed with 45 extended families. During the early Ottoman era it was part of the nahiye of Sopot, while in the 16th century it was incorporated into the kaza of Kurvelesh.

In the Albanian Revolt of 1910 the çetë (military unit) from Fterrë was led by Lazo Kofina.

In 1914 the village was destroyed during the advance of army of the Kingdom of Greece. The villagers, who had fled the vicinity of Vlorë, rebuilt the village in 1916 when the Greek army retreated from Albania. In autumn 1916 the village's school was rebuilt and Selim Gjonika became its first teacher. In the Vlora War in 1920 the band of Fterra took part under the leadership of Xhafer Shehu.

In World War II part of the village was destroyed by Italian artillery fire during the Greco-Italian War. In 1942 the first council of the National Liberation Movement in the village and its volunteer platoon were founded under Hiqmet Çallo. In total during World War II six volunteer soldiers from Fterrë were killed and forty houses damaged and destroyed.

== Demographics ==
Population
Year	Number of Families
1431	12
1583	24
1900	80-100
1944	116
1960	102
1980	109
1990	114
1998	61
2004	50

== Notable people ==
- Nafiz Bezhani, jurist, politician and writer.
- Muzafer Korkuti, archaeologist and Vice President of the Academy of Sciences of Albania.
- Jakup Mato, head of Centre of Art Studies of the Academy of Sciences of Albania.
