= Giuseppe Schirò (bishop) =

Arbëreshë writer and priest

Giuseppe Schirò (1690–1769) was an Arbëreshë writer of the 18th century, and Catholic priest of the Byzantine Rite. In 1736, he was appointed Byzantine Catholic Archbishop of Durazzo.

He was born in 1690 in Piana degli Albanesi, an Arbëreshë village of Sicily and there he became a priest of the Italo-Albanian Catholic Church. He is thought to have taken his first lessons from Giorgio Guzzetta.

He became a writer in Greek and in Arbëresh, and later (1736) became Archbishop of the Byzantine Catholic Archdiocese of Durazzo, and vicar apostolic in mission of Himara.

Schirò died in 1769 and will be remembered for his important contributions to early Albanian literature.
