= List of castles in Albania =

This article lists the castles and fortifications of Albania. There are a total of 158 castles and fortifications in the country that have achieved the status of monument of cultural heritage. The English equivalent for Kala in Albanian is Fortress. The latter is most fit for usage to describe many of the below structures as documented by official travel guides.

== Main castles ==
| # | Name | Location | Status | Elevation | Built | Description | Image |
|---|---|---|---|---|---|---|---|
| 1 | Krujë Fortress | Krujë; 41.506944°N 19.793889°E | preserved | 557 m (1,827 ft) | 5th–6th century | The fortress served as the center of Skanderbeg's rebellion against the Ottoman Empire. | |
| 2 | Gjirokastër Fortress | Gjirokastër; 40.073822°N 20.140750°E | preserved | 336 m (1,102 ft) | 12th century | The fortress dominates the town of Gjirokastër and overlooks the strategically important route along the river valley. | |
| 3 | Berat Castle | Berat; 40.708514°N 19.945727°E | preserved | 214 m (702 ft) | 13th century | The castle is built on a rocky hill on the left bank of the river Osum overlooking the town of Berat. | |
| 4 | Rozafa Castle | Shkodër; 42.046468°N 19.493669°E | ruin | 130 m (430 ft) | 4th–3rd century BC | Located on a hilltop and surrounded by the rivers Buna and Drin, the castle has been settled since antiquity. It was an Illyrian stronghold until it was captured by the Romans in 167 BC. | |
| 5 | Ali Pasha Castle | Butrint; 39.741619°N 19.992480°E | preserved | 30 m (98 ft) | 15th–16th century | The castle lies some 2.4 km (1.5 mi) due west at the mouth of the Vivari Channel. It was built to prevent the advancement of French forces from Corfu. | |
| 6 | Bashtovë Fortress | Vilë-Ballaj; 41.046900°N 19.496500°E | ruin | 0.2 m (7.9 in) | 15th century | Located near the outflow of the Shkumbin River into the Adriatic Sea in Central Albania, the fortress is part of the tentative list for inclusion in the UNESCO World Heritage Site list. | |
| 7 | Porto Palermo Castle | Himarë; 40.062248°N 19.790703°E | preserved | 113 m (371 ft) | 15th century | The triangular shaped castle is situated in the closed bay of Porto Palermo, a few kilometers south of Himarë. | |
| 8 | Rodon Castle | Cape of Rodon; 41.585815°N 19.448147°E | ruin | 1 m (3 ft 3 in) | 1452, 1500 | According to Marin Barleti the castle was destroyed by the Ottomans in 1467. In 1500, the castle was rebuilt by the Republic of Venice. | |
| 9 | Elbasan Castle | Elbasan; 41.113188°N 20.081693°E | ruin | 133 m (436 ft) | 1466 | This rectangular shaped fortress houses 12 monuments of cultural heritage within its walls. | |
| 10 | Tepelenë Castle | Tepelenë; 40.299167°N 20.021483°E | ruin | 190 m (620 ft) | 1819 | The walls of this castle do not form a normal geometric pattern. It once served as the second residence of Ali Pashë Tepelena. | |
| 11 | Lezhë Castle | Lezhë; 41.783678°N 19.649914°E | ruin | 322 m (1,056 ft) | 9th century | This massive fortification was built on the ruins of ancient Akrolis (Lissus). It was burnt twice in 1478 and 1503 from local residents who tried to push the invading Ottoman armies from settling their military base there. | |
| 12 | Durrës Castle | Durrës; 41.310530°N 19.446060°E | preserved | 3.3 m (11 ft) | 5th century | The castle was built by the Byzantine Emperor Anastasius I (r. 491–518), who was born in Durrës. | |
| 13 | Petrelë Castle | Petrelë; 41.254795°N 19.854176°E | preserved | 329 m (1,079 ft) | 6th century | Perched on a rocky hill, above the village with the same name, the castle has a triangular shape with two observation towers. | |
| 14 | Prezë Castle | Prezë; 41.431477°N 19.672327°E | preserved | 253 m (830 ft) | 550s | Located on a hilltop in the village of Prezë, the castle once belonged to the feudal Thopia family which ruled the region. | |
| 15 | Lëkurësi Castle | Sarandë; 39.865875°N 20.025714°E | ruin | 246 m (807 ft) | 1537 | The castle of Lëkurës was built by Sultan Suleiman the Magnificent who had attacked Corfu and needed to control the harbor of Saranda and the road that connected it with Butrint. | |
| 16 | Libohovë Castle | Libohovë; 40.031393°N 20.265551°E | preserved | 455 m (1,493 ft) | 1798 | The castle was a present by Ali Pasha to his sister Shanisha, who was born in Libohovë. | |
| 17 | Ishëm Castle | Ishëm; 41.539281°N 19.595598°E | ruin | 204 m (669 ft) | 1574 | Located near the river Ishëm, the castle was built by the Ottomans to stop the peasant rebellions. | |
| 18 | Delvinë Castle | Delvinë; 39.946833°N 20.090722°E | ruin | 221 m (725 ft) | 14th century | The castle, in the shape of an ellipse, whose protective walls surround a steep rocky hill about 60 meters long and 30 meters wide, played a strategic role in closing the Delvina basin and the Rëzomë area for passage to the Drinos valley. | |
| 19 | Borsh Castle | Borsh; 40.069870°N 19.856091°E | ruin | 287 m (942 ft) | 4th century BCE | Historically known as the Castle of Sopot by the name of the hill on which it is located, the castle was heavily damaged during the barbarian invasions of the fifth and sixth centuries AD, and it was rebuilt in the Middle Ages at which time it took its present name. | |
| 20 | Kaninë Castle | Kaninë; 40.444566°N 19.521313°E | ruin | 325 m (1,066 ft) | 6th century | During the 13th and 14th centuries, the castle turned into a first-class military center, serving the Kingdom of Albania. It was later remodeled by Suleiman the Magnificent in 1530 and recently by the Albanian feudalists of Vlorë in the 17th and 19th centuries. | |
| 21 | Venetian Acropolis Castle | Butrint; 39.746108°N 20.019950°E | Preserved | 253 m (830 ft) | 14th century | In 1386 the Venetians purchased the land around Butrint from the Angevins. The castle was built in the 14th century on the highest point on the peninsula. | |

== Other castles ==
- Dajti Castle
- Dorëzi Fortress
- Drisht Castle
- Gjon Boçari Castle
- Himarë Castle
- Kardhiq Castle
- Këlcyrë Castle
- Kratul Fortification
- Margëlliç Castle
- Paleokastra Castle
- Peca Castle
- Peqin Castle
- Persqopi Castle
- Pogradec Castle
- Tirana Fortress
- Tujani Castle
- Venetian Triangular Castle
- Vlora Castle
- Vokopolë Castle
- Sati Castle
- Grazhdan Castle

== See also ==
- List of castles
- Tourism in Albania
