= Uji i Ftohtë, Tepelenë =

Water spring and natural phenomenon

Cold Water, Tepelenë
- Uji i Ftohtë, Tepelenë
- IUCN category III (natural monument or feature)
- Location within Albania
- Location: Tepelenë, Gjirokastër County, Albania
- Coordinates: 40°18′31″N 20°0′17″E
- Area: 1.5 ha (3.7 acres)
- Designation: Natural Monument
- Designated: 2020
- Governing body: National Agency for Protected Areas

Uji i Ftohtë is a natural spring located approximately 8 km south of the town of Tepelenë, in Gjirokastër County, southern Albania. The spring has existed for over 250 years and emerges from rocky terrain, with cold and clear water that contributes to the Vjosa River, also from the upper left slope of the Drino Valley in the contact of limestone with flushes. Historically, it was reportedly discovered by Ali Pasha (1740–1822) during the Ottoman period. The surrounding area includes native vegetation such as oak and hawthorn trees, along with various shrubs.

The site is recognized as a natural monument by the Albanian government. It has hydrological, geomorphological, and recreational significance. The surrounding natural park provides habitat for regional flora and fauna. The spring is accessible via the Tepelenë–Gjirokastër road and is visited throughout the year.

== See also ==
- Tepelenë
- Drino Valley
