= Dorëzi Fortress =

Fort in Tirana, Albania

- Dorëz village, 5 km east of Pezë, and 20 km southwest of Tirana, Albania

Site information
- Type: Hill castle
- Owner: Public
- Open to the public: No
- Condition: Inaccessible

Location
- Coordinates: 41.2265°N 19.7435°E

Site history
- Built: 9th century BC
- Built by: Unknown
- In use: Until 6th century AD
- Materials: Stone

The Dorëzi Fortress is situated close to Dorëz village in Albania, 5 km east of Pezë and 20 km southwest of Tirana. It is the oldest in the Tirana County and dates to the 9th century BC.

== History ==
The first archaeological expedition was performed in 1951. The ruins of the fortress are to be found in one of the highest hills of the Krrabë, at about 479 metres (1,572 ft) above sea level. It is thought that Dimale may have been situated in the Dorëzi Fortress. The surrounding wall is in its southern part, and is 300 metres (980 ft) long from east to west. The fortress construction seems to have had three phases—the first with raw stones, the second with carved blocks placed with no mortar (Hellenistic period) and the third with crushed stones and the use of mortar (4th–6th centuries AD). One can see the main entrance of the fortress. The presence of old vases that date to those centuries suggests that the site was inhabited until at least the 4th–6th centuries AD.
