= All Saints' Church, Himarë =

18th-century church in Albania

Coordinates: 40°7′3″N 19°44′2″E

All Saints' Church
- Kisha e Gjithshenjtorëve; Greek: Ναός Αγιών Πάντων (Albanian)
- Interactive map of All Saints' Church
- Location: Himarë

Cultural Monument of Albania

All Saints' Church (Albanian: Kisha e Gjithshenjtorëve, Greek: Ναός Αγιών Πάντων) is an Albanian Orthodox church and Cultural Monument of Albania in Himarë, Vlorë County, Albania. It was built around 1775 at the behest of Kosmos of Aetolia and contains an iconostasis. During the communist period of Albania's history, the church was used as a warehouse for oranges.

== Description ==
All Saints' Church style is similar to that of churches in Central and Western Macedonia during the 19th century. The walls are made up of rubble stone and plaster. It has a single tiled roof, a timber-roofed basilica with a gallery and three aisles which are divided by two colonnades each consisting of four plastered columns. The central aisle's roof is four-pitched, taller than the other roofs and rests on the colonnades. The other two aisles have lean-to roofs.

The approximate dimensions of the church are 15.4 metres by 30.7 metres with an internal height of 9.5 metres. There are different levels within the church due to it being built on sloping ground.

== History ==
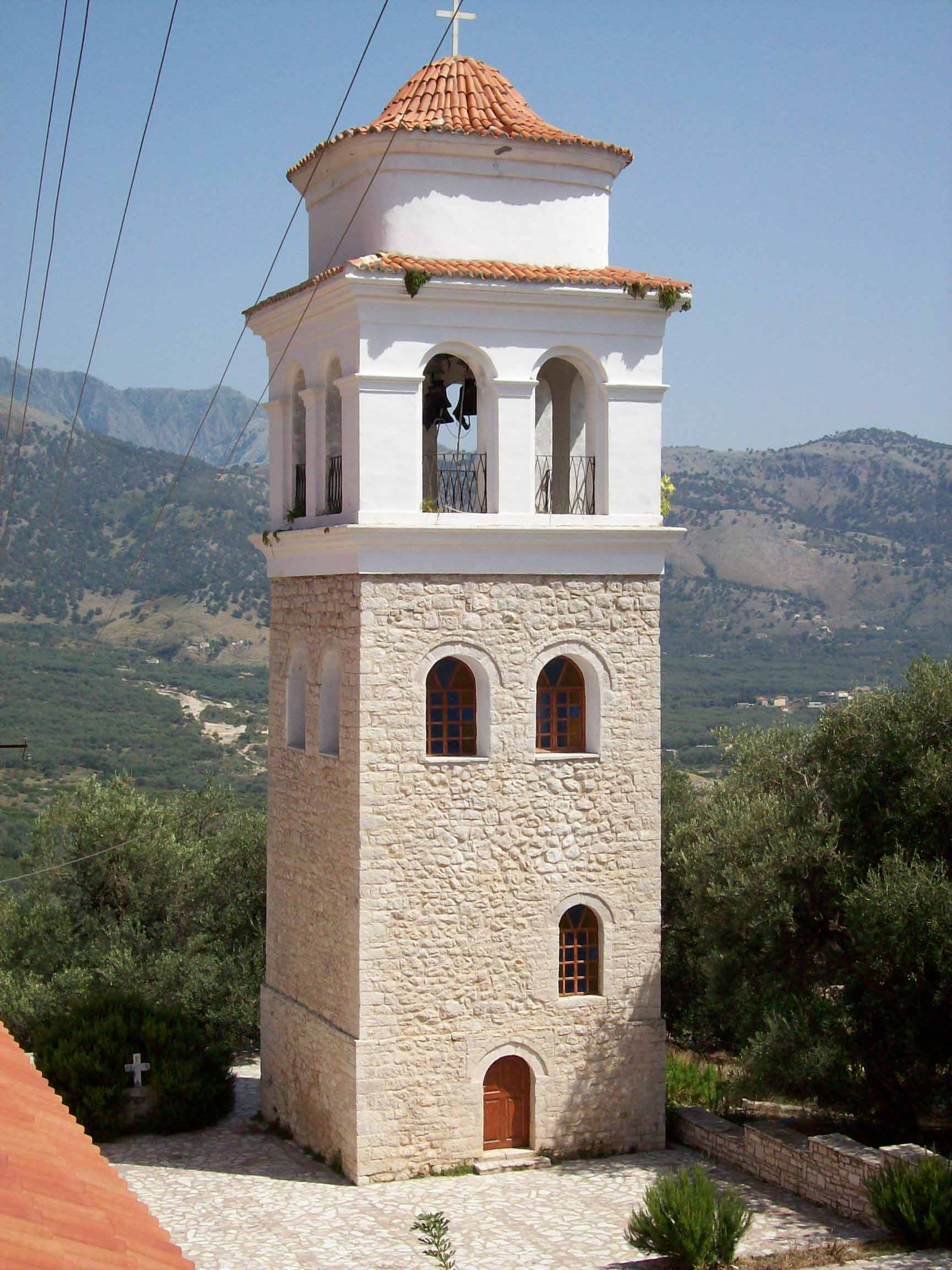
Himarë Bell Tower, located besides All Saints' Church

According to legend, Kosmos of Aetolia commissioned the church around 1775. It was built at the entrance to Himare Castle. He reportedly asked residents to build more schools than churches and had a Greek school built near All Saints' Church. A bell tower was built beside the church in 1878.

The iconostasis, constructed by a master and delivered in 1826, includes an ornate wooden cross. It was damaged during the communist period of Albania's history when the church was used as a warehouse for oranges. All Saints' Church was declared a Cultural Monument of Albania in 1970 and was restored and reopened in the 1990s under the care of Archbishop Anastas.

During the 1990s, the bells in the neighbouring belltower were stolen. In July 2012, on two separate occasions, parts of the iconostasis were stolen but the icons and other historical items in the All Saints' Church went untouched.

In 2022, the Himara International Music Festival was held at All Saints' Church. Ana Carla Maza, Matthias Kirschnereit, Rea Veizi and Endri Nini performed at the festival.
