= Ali Pasha Castle =

Fort in Butrint, southern Albania

- Kalaja e Ali Pashës
- Butrint, Vlorë County in Albania
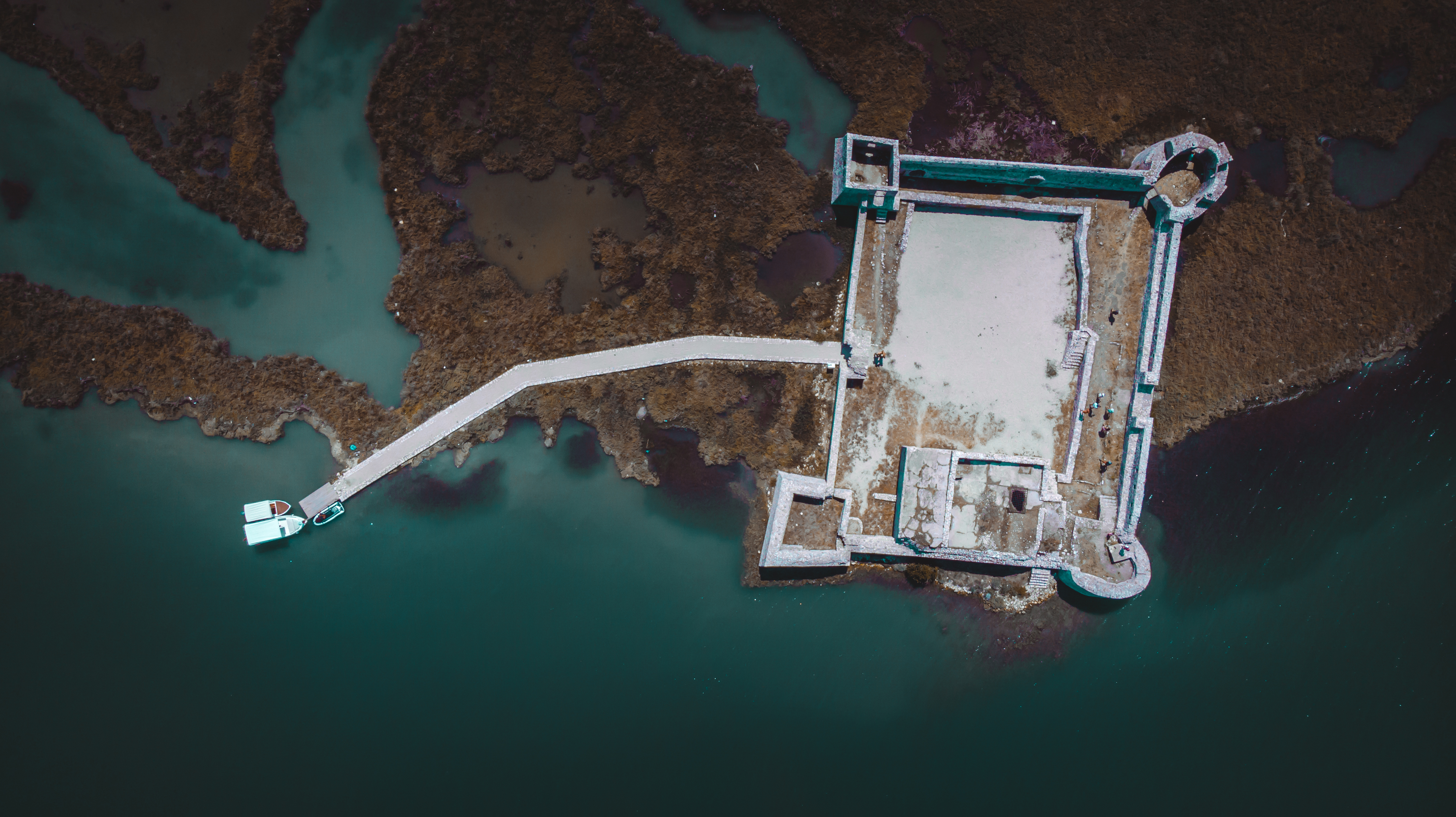
- Aerial view of Ali Pasha Castle

Site information
- Type: Fortress
- Owner: Albania
- Controlled by: Republic of Venice; Ottoman Empire; Albania
- Open to the public: Yes

Location
- Location in Albania
- Coordinates: 39°44′30″N 19°59′33″E

Site history
- Built: 15th Century

Ali Pasha Castle (Albanian: Kalaja e Ali Pashës) is a castle in Albania. It is named after Ali Pasha of Tepelenë who resided there until 1820. The current fortress was rebuilt in 1819 from its surface with 3 towers. Until 1820 it was the second residence of Ali Pashe Tepelena.

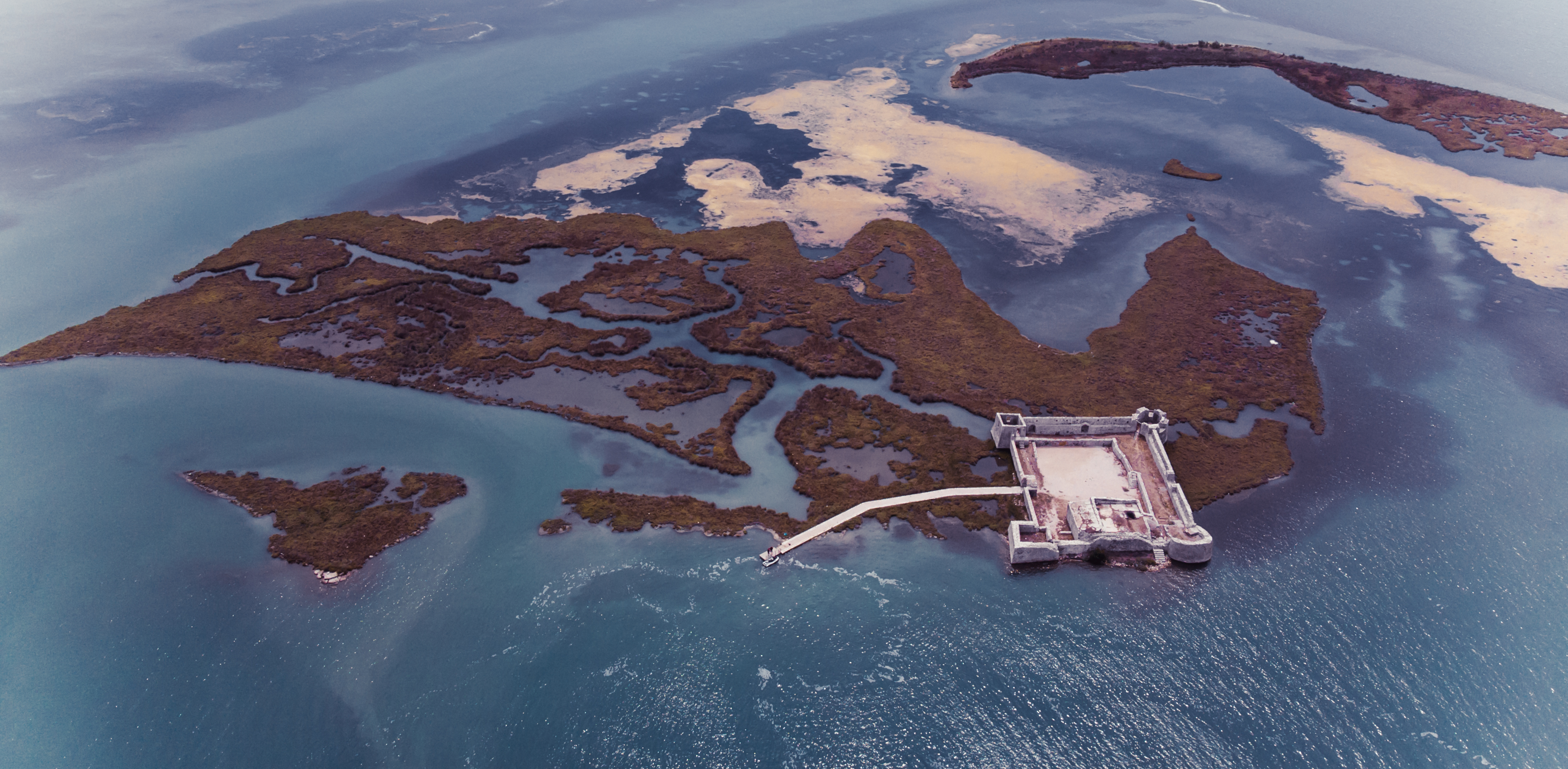
Aerial view of the castle.

== History ==
Built under Venetian dominion in the late 15th or early 16th century, it provided a stronghold for the Venetians on Corfu to exploit fishing, grazing, olives and timber in and around Butrint. The castle was the centrepiece of numerous conflicts with the burgeoning Ottoman Empire, and changed hands on several occasions. It was destroyed by a retreating French army in 1798 to prevent it falling into the hands of Ali Pasha.

The fortification attributed to Ali Pasha at Butrint lies some 2.4 kilometres (1.5 mi) due west at the mouth of the Vivari Channel. This in itself began life in the late 17th or early 18th century as a fortified estate centre belonging to a Corfiote family that farmed land on the plains south of the ancient city. Ali Pasha seized control of the structure around 1804 and carried out a series of defensive improvements including the installation of gun batteries. Given its small size it is unlikely that the fort functioned as anything more than a control over access from the sea to Butrint, and it can not be compared to Ali's more redoubtable fortresses in the region at Tepelena, Gjirokastra and Ioannina.

== See also ==
- List of castles in Albania
- Tourism in Albania
- Architecture of Albania
