= Prezë Castle =

Medieval castle in Albania

- Kalaja e Prezës
- Prezë Albania
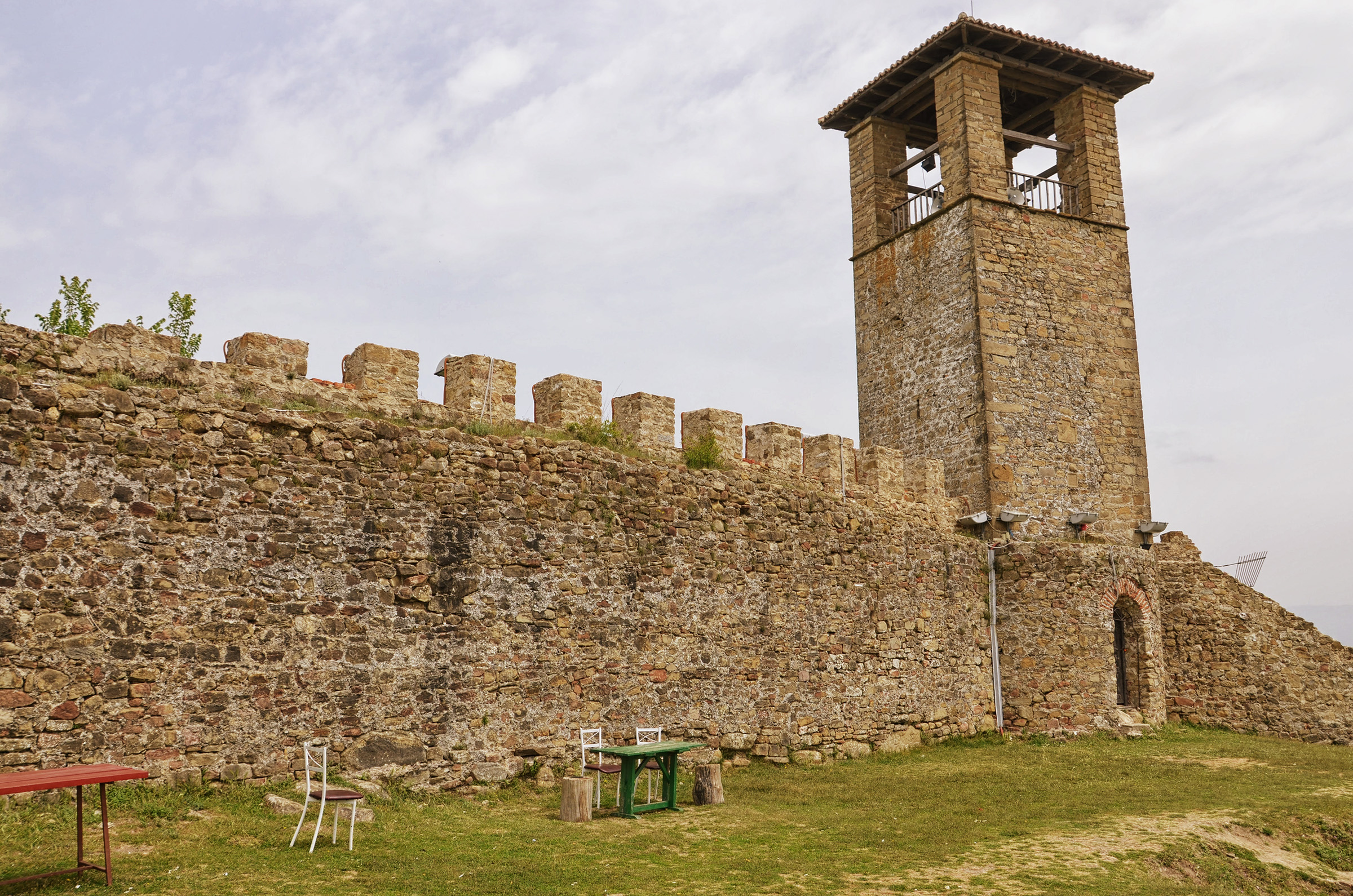

Site information
- Type: Castle
- Owner: Albania
- Controlled by: Byzantine Empire; Principality of Arbanon; Kingdom of Albania; Principality of Albania; Principality of Kastrioti; League of Lezhë; Ottoman Empire; Albania
- Open to the public: Yes

Location
- Location within Albania
- Coordinates: 41.431°N 19.672°E

Site history
- Built: 550
- Built by: Justinian I
- Materials: Stone

Garrison information
- Current commander: Njesia Administrative Prezë

The Prezë Castle (Albanian: Kalaja e Prezës) is a medieval castle in Prezë, Albania. The mosque inside the castle, built in the 1500s, is one of the oldest mosques in Albania.

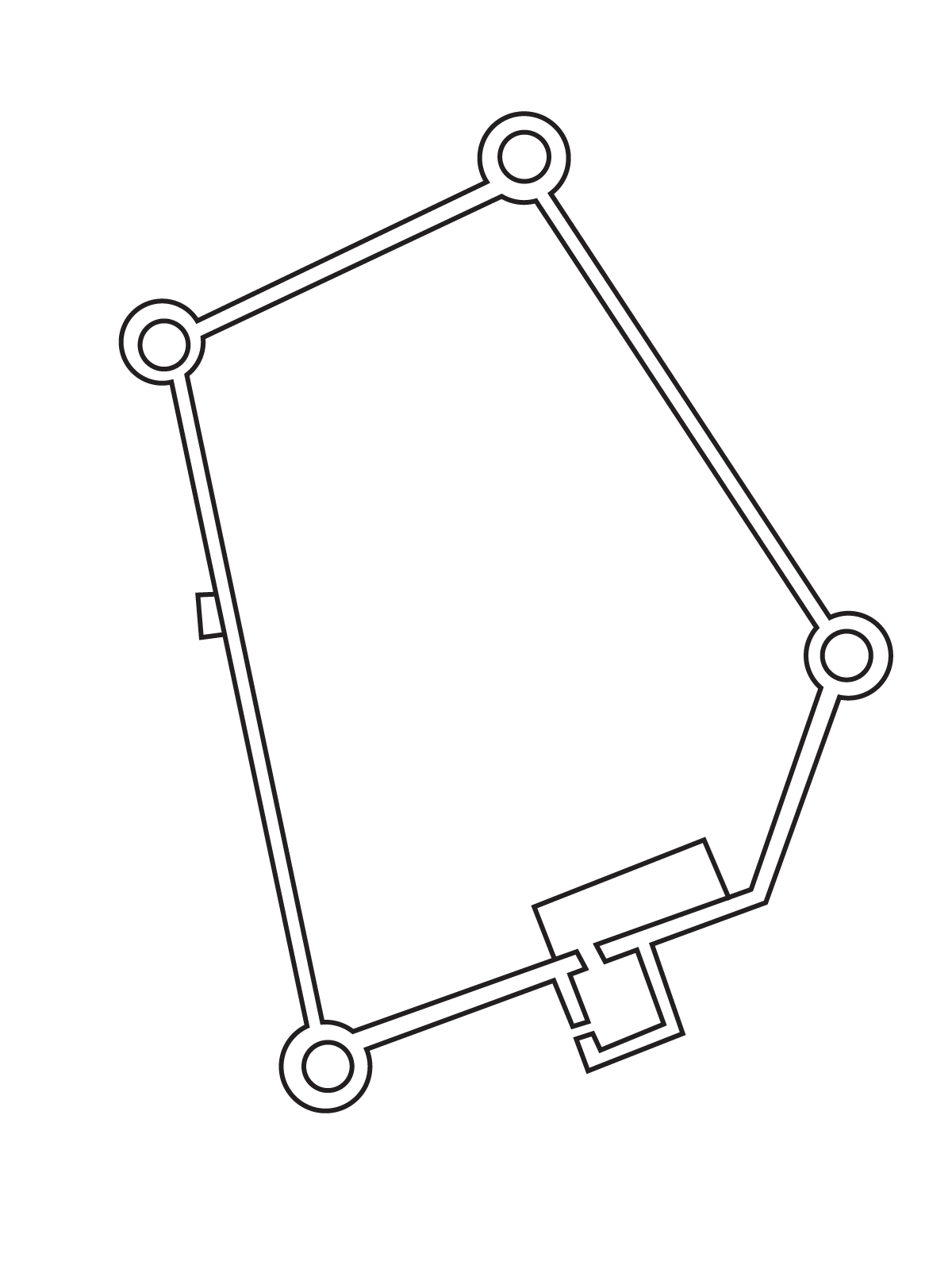
Planimetry of Prezë Castle

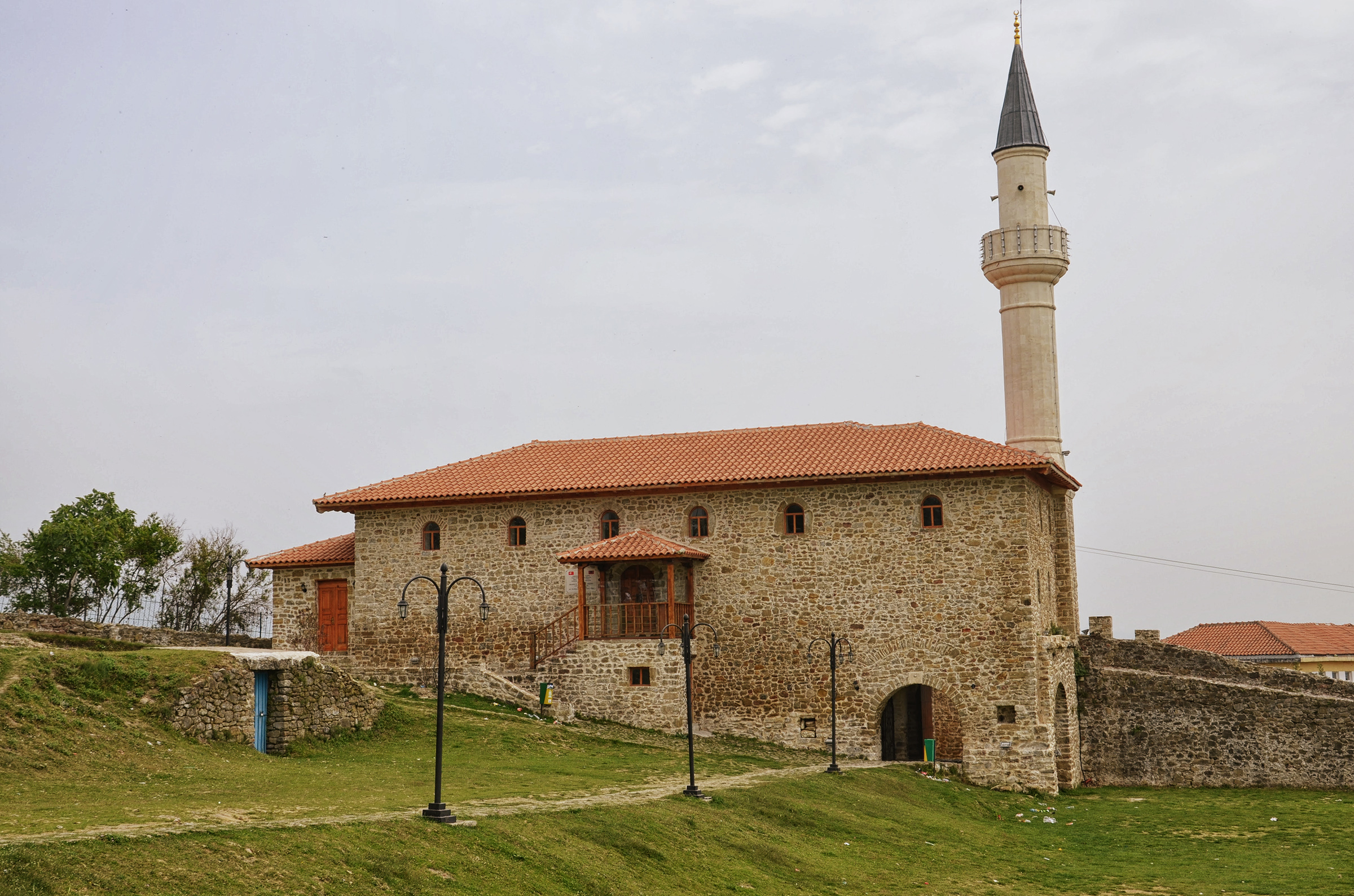
Image of the castle mosque from the West Tower

Preza Castle was built by the Byzantine emperor Justinian the Great in the 550s.

The castle overlooks the village with the same name and is located on a hilltop. The castle was enlarged by a construction which started in the 14th century and was completed in the early 15th century and belonged to the Thopias, a local Albanian feudal family. During 1443-1468 it was one of the core strongholds of the Albanian resistance against the Ottoman Empire led by Skanderbeg.

The castle has been declared a 'monument of culture'. It has four towers, one in each corner. The clock tower was erected around 1800–50. It is known for its beautiful location, overlooking the Tirana plain. The castle is quite close to the Mother Teresa International Airport. A restaurant named Kalaja E Prezës and other service facilities are found inside the castle.

== See also ==
- List of castles in Albania
- Tourism in Albania
- Landmarks in Tirana
- Architecture of Albania
