= Delvinë Castle =

- Delvinë, in Southern Albania
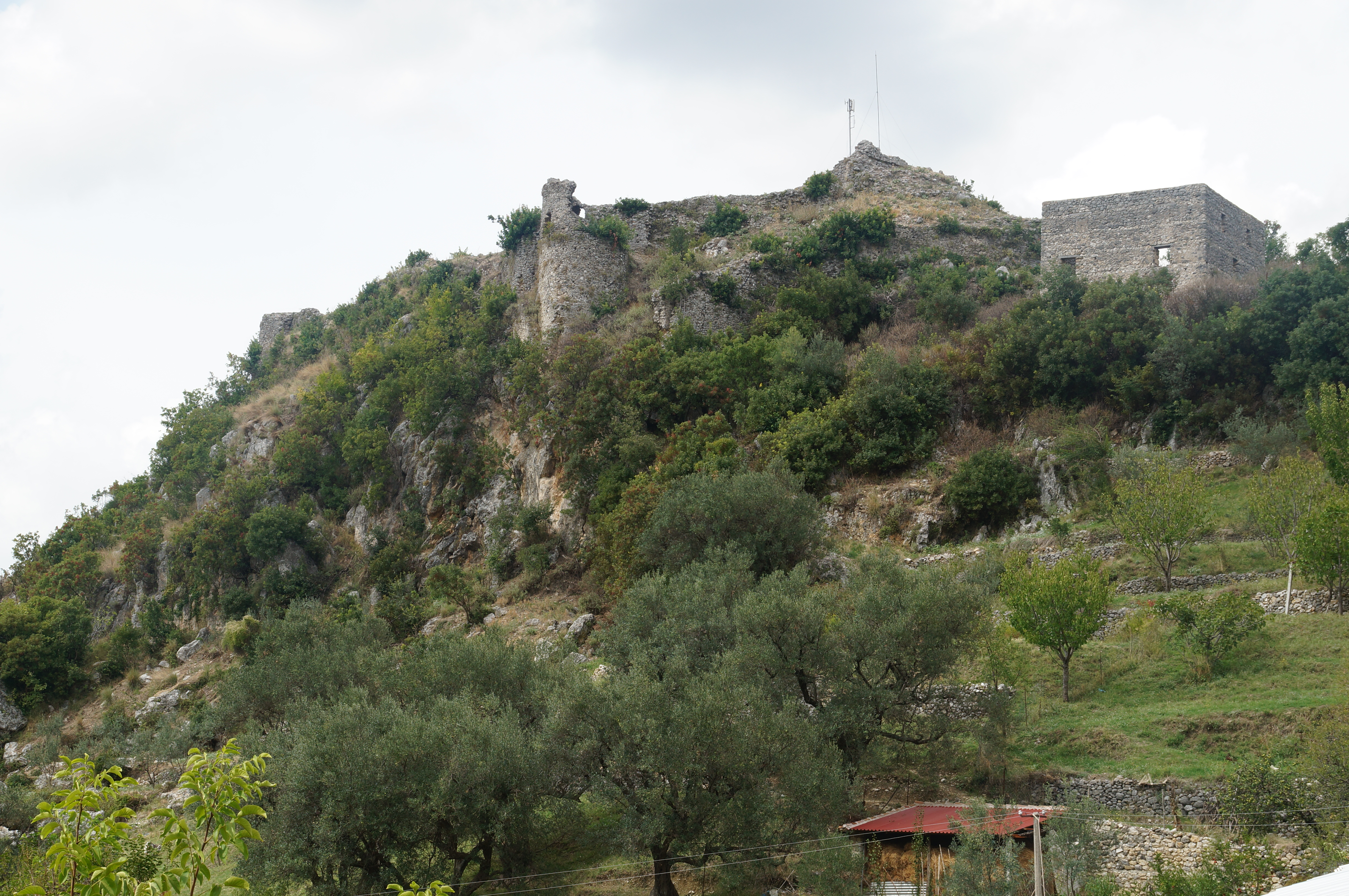
- The Delvinë Castle

Site information
- Owner: Albania
- Controlled by: Roman Empire; Byzantine Empire; Spata family Republic of Venice; Spanish Empire; Ottoman Empire; Albania
- Open to the public: Yes

Location
- Coordinates: 39.947169957260634°N 20.090884286583556°E

Site history
- Materials: Ancient Blocks

Delvinë Castle is a castle near Delvinë. It is unclear when the castle was built exactly but it is theorized the castle was first built in late antiquity. It was rebuilt and restored in the 11th and 12th century. It is fully formed in the 13th to 14th century. It was held by the Spata family and became vassals to the Venetian and finally Ottomans. The castle was held by the Venetian and possibly fell into Spanish hands as well. Evliya Çelebi describes the ancienty city in his book when he visited Delvinë in 1670. Today there is not much left of the castle and it is in ruins.

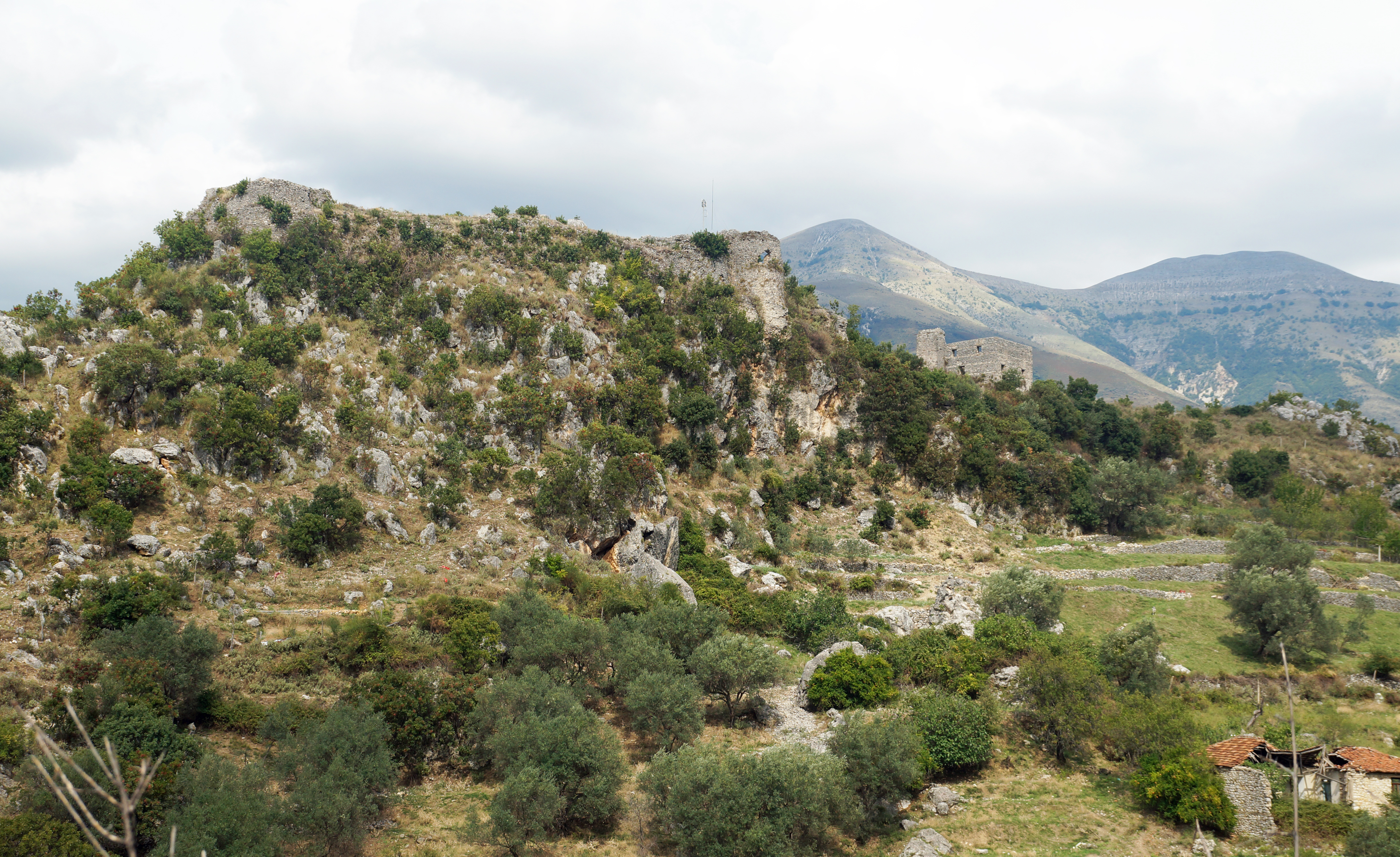
Another angle of the castle.

== See also ==
- Delvinë
- List of castles in Albania
- Tourism in Albania
- History of Albania
