= Tepelena Castle =

Castle in southern Albania

- Tepelenë, Southern Albania
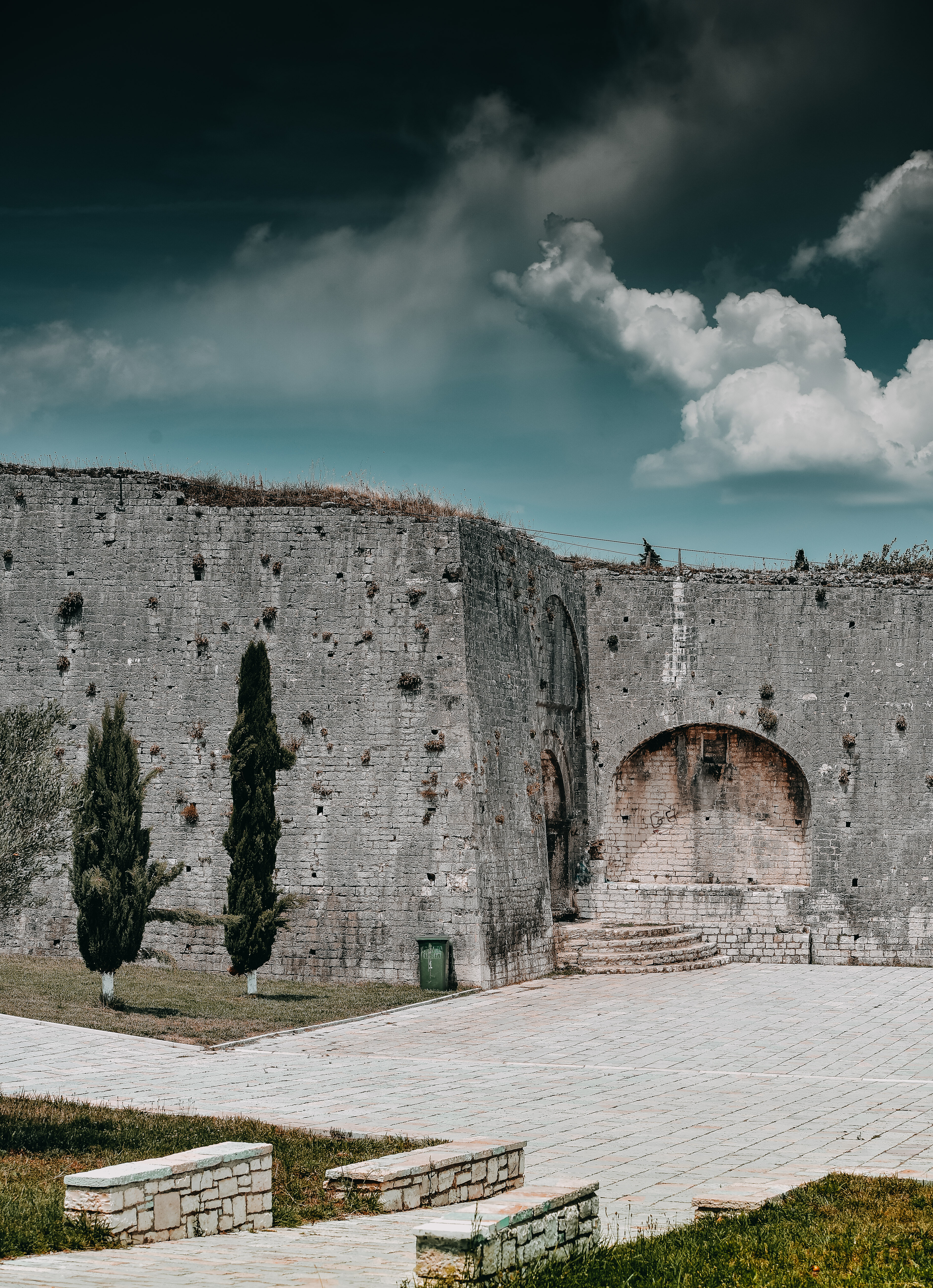
- Tepelena Castle

Site information
- Owner: Albania
- Controlled by: Byzantine Empire; Zenevisi family Ottoman Empire; Albania
- Open to the public: Yes

Location
- Location within Albania
- Coordinates: 40.2989°N 20.0214°E

Site history
- Built: Unknown date of Byzantine foundation, Ali Pasha of Ioannina expanded fortress in 1819

Tepelena Castle, also known as Ali Pasha's Castle, is a 4-hectare (9.9-acre) castle that lies in the southern Albanian town of Tepelenë. It was once an important residence of Ali Pashë Tepelena, a local ethnic Albanian and powerful Ottoman ruler of the Pashalik of Yanina.

== History ==
The city of Tepelena (Ottoman Turkish: Tepedelen) is first mentioned in 1482, during a one month long visit of Sultan Bayezid II. Only ten years later the town is mentioned in connection with a battle between Venetian forces and Albanian rebels against Ottoman forces.

The site of today's castle was most probably originally occupied by a Byzantine one. The hill on which Tepelena lies is very strategically important, as it is where the Drino valley and the Vjosa valley unite.

After occupying Tepelena and destroying the old Byzantine fortification, the Ottomans built a small castle. The tax register of 1520 mentions the settlement having 27 Christians and 3 Muslim households and the castle having a garrison of 183 soldiers.

In 1670, Evliya Çelebi describes the 40 houses of Tepelena in a rather desolate condition and also mentions that the settlement had no khan, no hammam, and no medrese or mekteb. Çelebi also mentions that the 80 villages of the region have a rather rebellious stance against the Sultan.

The Kâmûsü'l-A'lâm describes the town as rather small with 1800 inhabitants in 1888/89. It had 30 shops and two mosques, one of Sultan Bayezid II and one of Ali Pasha of Tepelena.

== Construction ==
=== Ottoman castle ===
The Ottoman castle had a size of 56 m x 40 m and had a wall which was 350 metres long. It had two gates, one to the North and one to the East. Parts of these gates still exist, together with remnants of the wall and two towers with a diameter of 10m and around 5m height. Part of this old castle are also the remnants of an old minaret, belonging to a former mosque. The walls of the castle were built using the Cloisonné technique.

According to Evliya Çelebi who describes the circumference of the castle as being 600 steps long, mentions a garnison of around 100 men in 1670.

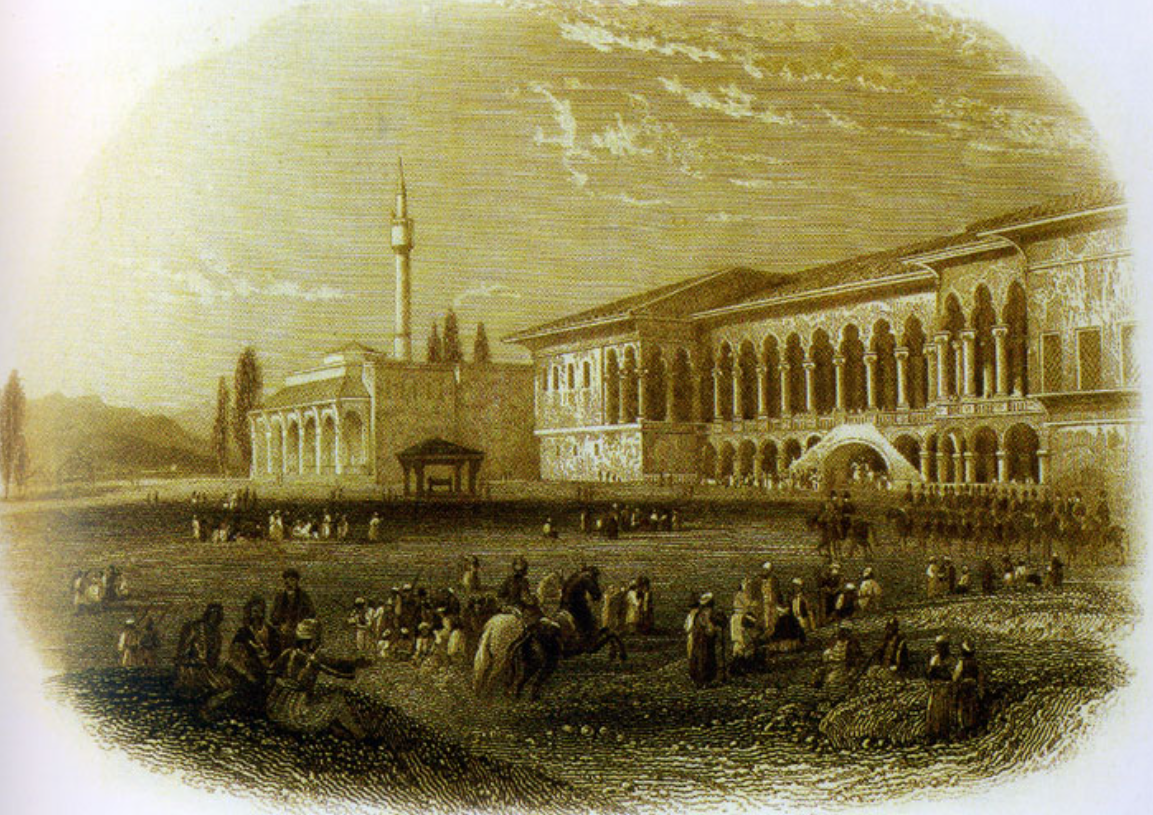
The palace of Ali Pasha in Tepelena together with his mosque, Engraving of Edward Finden, based on a drawing by William Purser, Early 19th century.

=== Ali Pasha's castle ===
Ali Pasha, a powerful Albanian who originally came from either Tepelena or Beçisht, a village nearby, took control of Tepelena in 1789. He expanded the fortress massively in the early 19th century. On the eastern gate, the so-called Vizier Gate (Albanian: Porta e Vezirit) a Greek inscription mentions the year 1819, however the castle remained unfinished as Ali Pasha died only shortly after in 1822 in Yanya. The main entrance had an Ottoman inscription up until the 1970s when it vanished. The castle Ali Pasha built is around 4ha big, the walls reach widths of up to 5m. The castle thrones above the Vjosa Valley and has three gates. The remnants of the walls have a height of around 10 metres. Three polygonal towers have survived, one in the southeast, one in the southwest and one in the northwest. The castle itself is a good example of Ottoman castle engineering of the 17th and 18th century. The old Ottoman castle of Bayezid II, which found itself inside the much bigger new castle, was used by Ali Pasha as a storage space

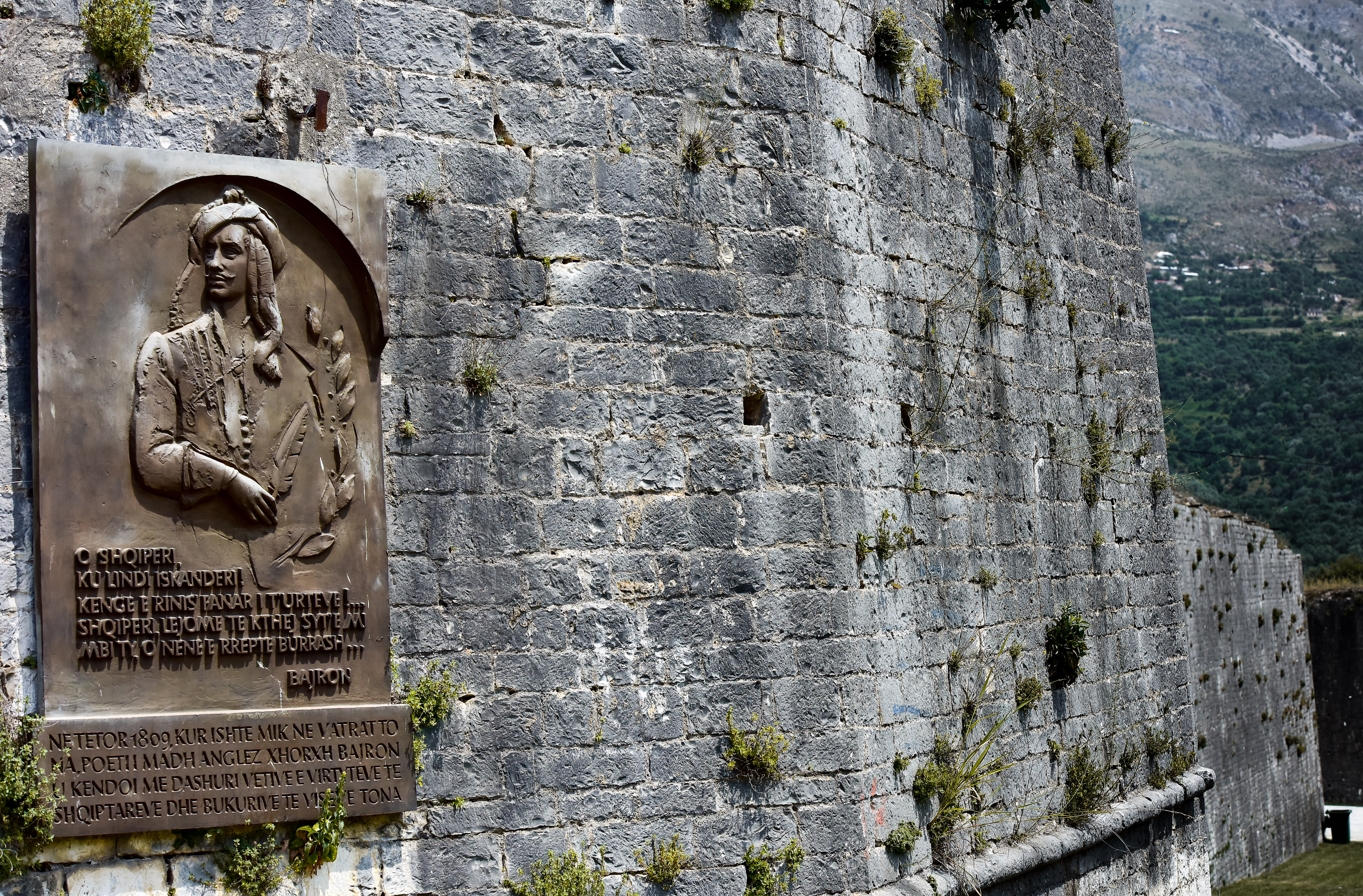
Monument of Lord Byron

The castle was home to several buildings, from barracks for the soldiers, to magazines, religious buildings and a prison. One of the most important buildings of the castle, which does not exist anymore, is the palace of Ali Pasha (Albanian: Sarajet e Ali Pashës). It was here that Lord Byron met Ali Pasha in 1809 and made him famous in Western Europe through his poem Childe Harold's Pilgrimage. François Pouqueville, on the other hand, who also visited Ali Pasha in his castle, compared it to a prison.

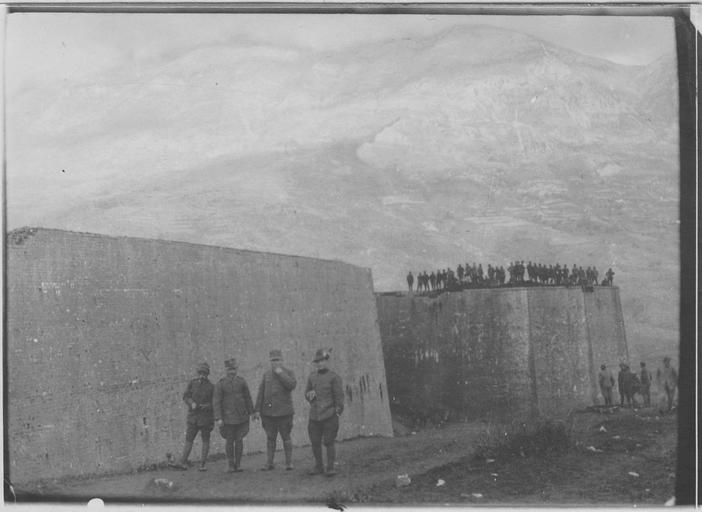
Greek soldiers after capturing Tepelena in 1916 next to its castle's main entrance.

== Present day ==
Today not far from the main entrance of the castle a monument commemorating Ali Pasha is found. Not much of the historic buildings of Tepelena in and outside of the castle have survived as the town suffered from severe damage from a massive earthquake and plundering Greek irregulars in the early 20th century, and saw enormous destruction in both world wars.

== See also ==
- Tepelena
- List of castles in Albania
- Tourism in Albania
