= Peca Castle =

- Kalaja e Pecës
- Kukës, in Northeastern Albania
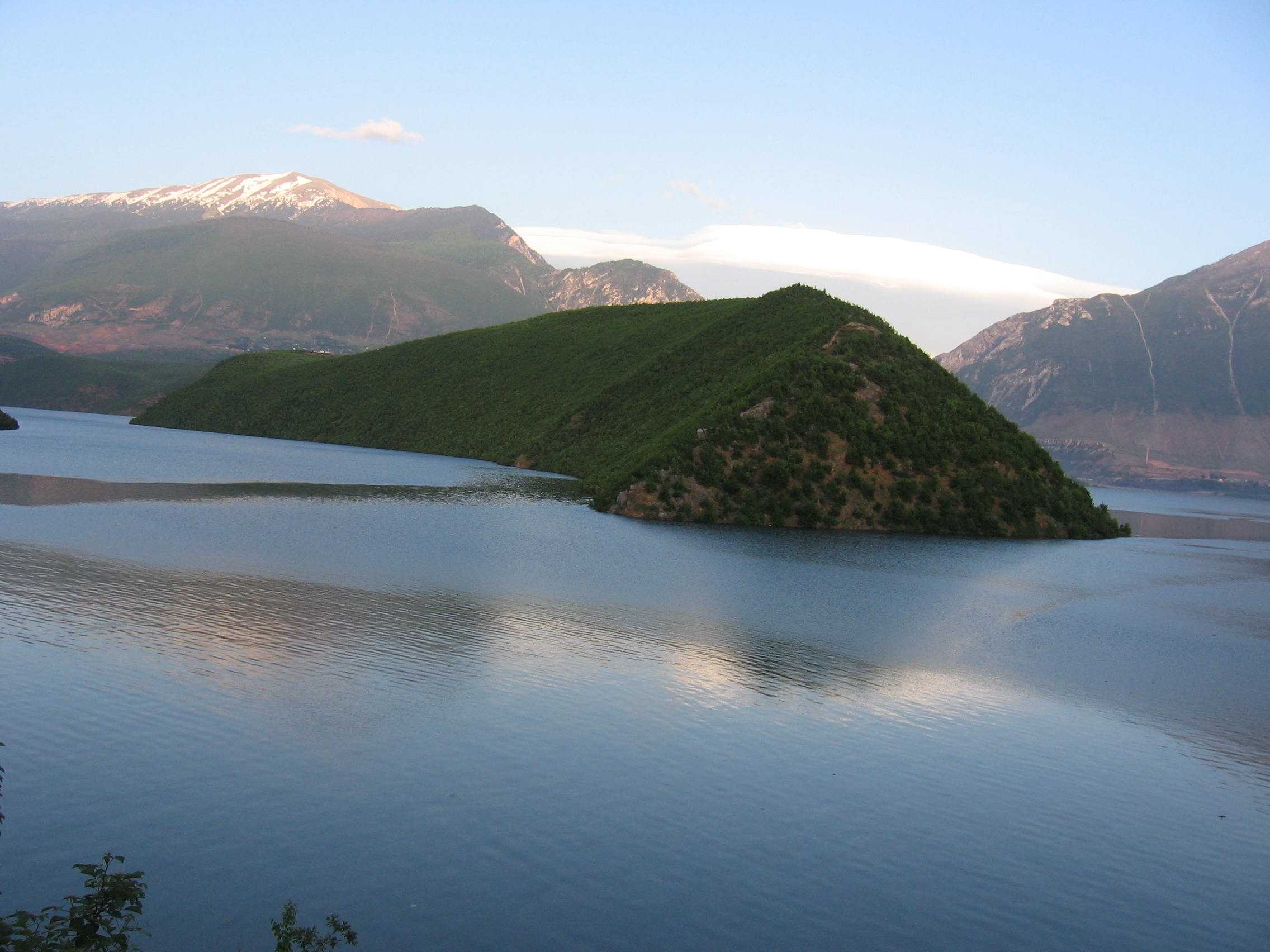
- Ruins of Peca Castle on the hill.

Site information
- Owner: Albania
- Controlled by: Illyrian tribes Roman Empire; Byzantine Empire; Principality of Arbanon; Principality of Dukagjini; League of Lezhë; Ottoman Empire; Albania
- Open to the public: Yes

Location
- Location within Albania
- Coordinates: 42.097359213151755°N 20.422866343259713°E

Site history
- Built: 6th century BC
- Materials: Ancient blocks

Peca Castle (Albanian: Kalaja e Pecës) is a castle near the city of Kukës, in northeastern Albania. It sits on a Peninsula on Fierza Reservoir. The castle is believed to have been built in the 6th century BC. There is a church inside the castle built by Justinian.

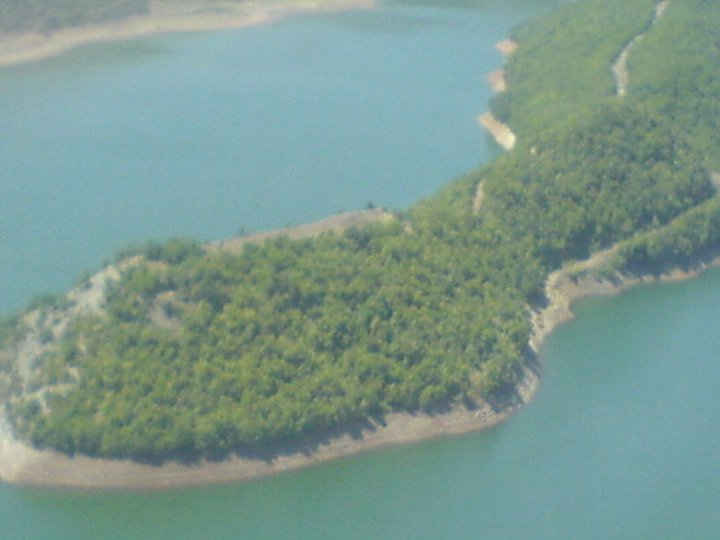
The Ruins of the castle can be seen sitting on the hill of the Peninsula.

== See also ==
- Kukës
- List of castles in Albania
- Tourism in Albania
- History of Albania
