= Borsh Castle =

Castle in Albania

- Kalaja e Borshit
- Borsh, in southern Albania
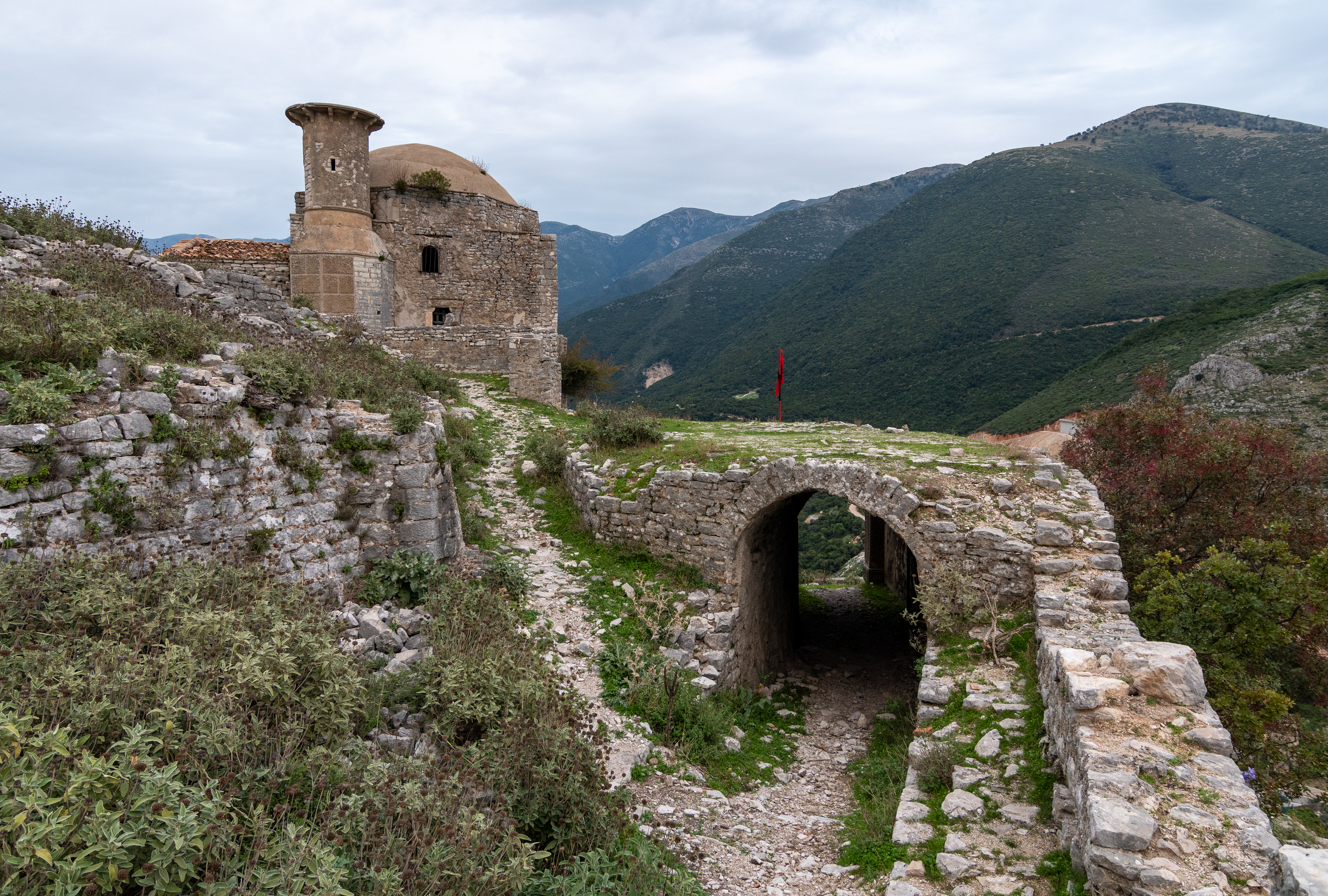
- Borsh Castle entrance with its Haji Bedo Mosque

Site information
- Owner: Albania
- Controlled by: Chaonians; Despotate of Epirus; Byzantine Empire; Republic of Venice; Ottoman Empire; Albania
- Open to the public: Yes

Location
- Location within Albania
- Coordinates: 40.070278°N 19.855556°E

Site history
- Built: 4th century BC
- Materials: Limestone, brick

Borsh Castle (Albanian: Kalaja e Borshit) also known as Sopot Castle (Albanian: Kalaja e Sopotit) from the hill it is located, is a historic castle near the village Borsh, Albania, near the coast of the Ionian Sea. The only standing building inside the castle is the 17th-century Hajji Bendo Mosque from Ottoman times which got ruined in the 20th century.

== History ==
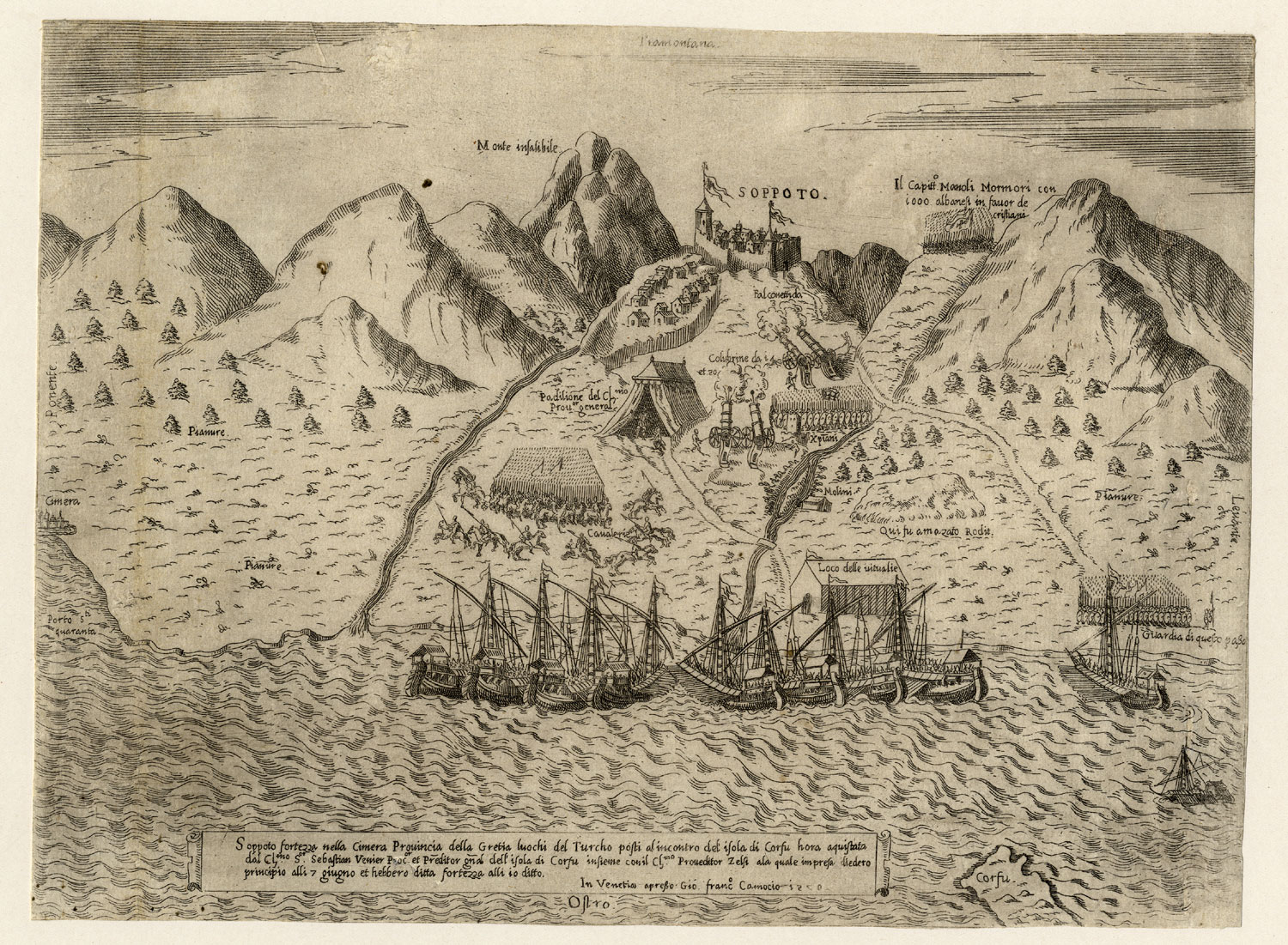
Drawing of Borsh Castle in 1570 during capture by Venetian Ships.

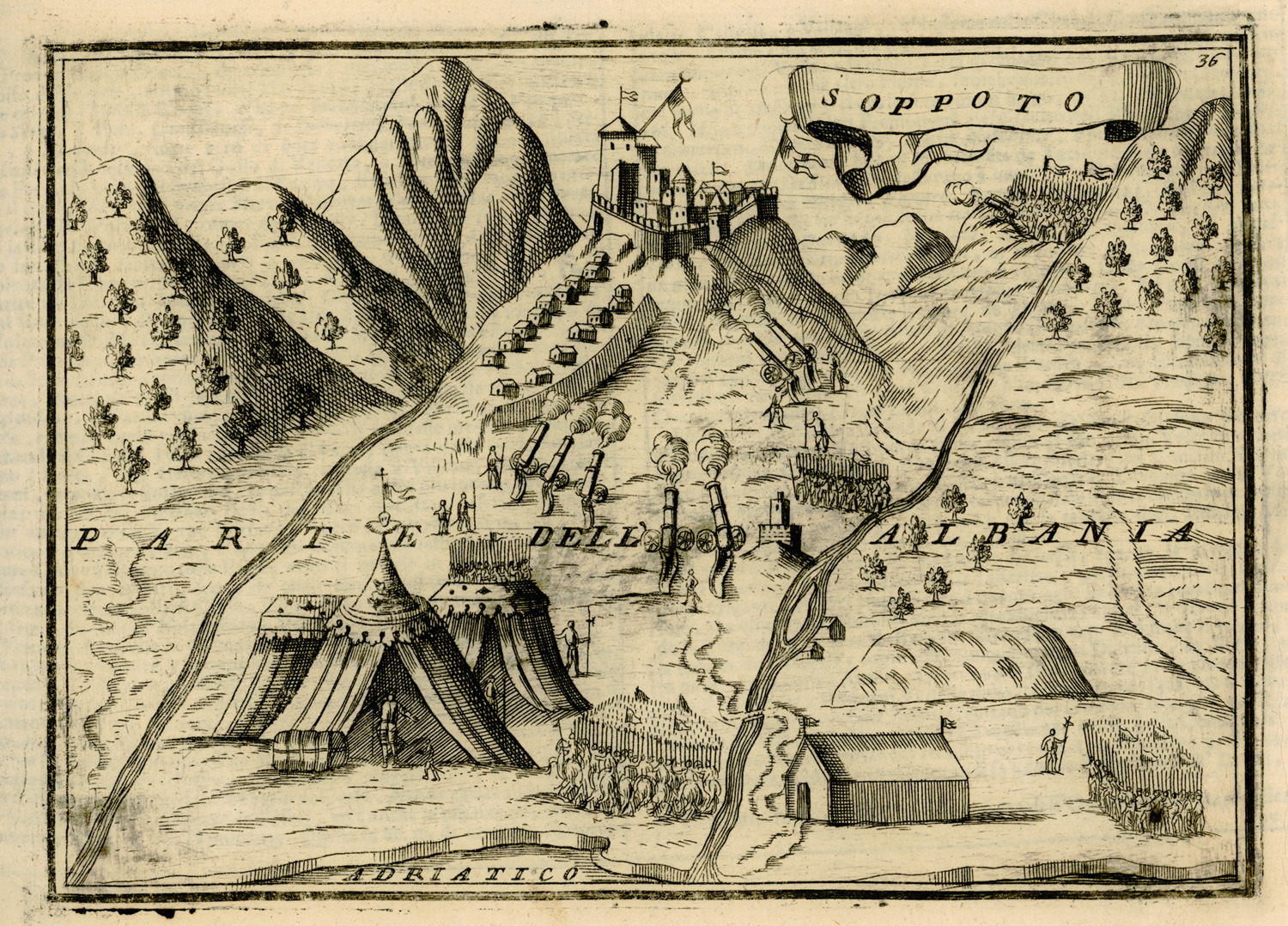
The fortress of Borsh besieged by the Venetian army and fllet in 1570. Drawn by Vincenzo Coronelli

The earliest finds date to the end of the Bronze Age, when early fortifications were built along the coast. Their purpose probably was to defend against Dorian attacks in the 12th century BC. Later in the second half of the 4th century BC the site evolved into a small hill town. The castle's fortifications follow the trace of an acropolis, with four subsequent phases of reconstruction, ranging from the early Byzantine period to the late Middle Ages. At the end of the 1st century BC the settlement was abandoned for more than 1100 years. Since then the history of the place has been closely linked with that of Himara. The name "Sopot" is of Slavic origin. In medieval Greek documents, the castle is named Sopoton or Sopotos, while its harbour is mentioned in Greek portolans with the name Gazopolis.

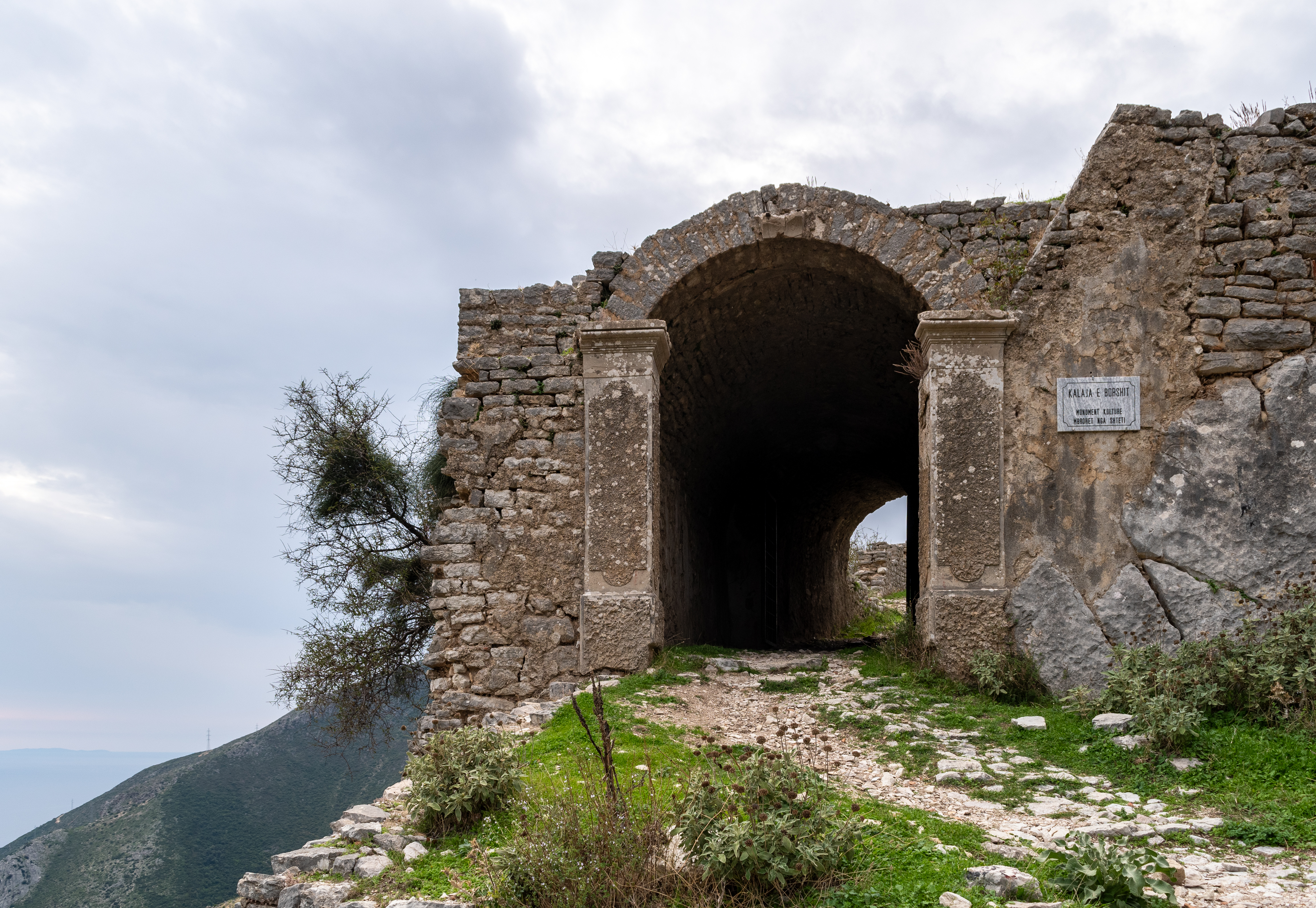
Entrance to the Castle.

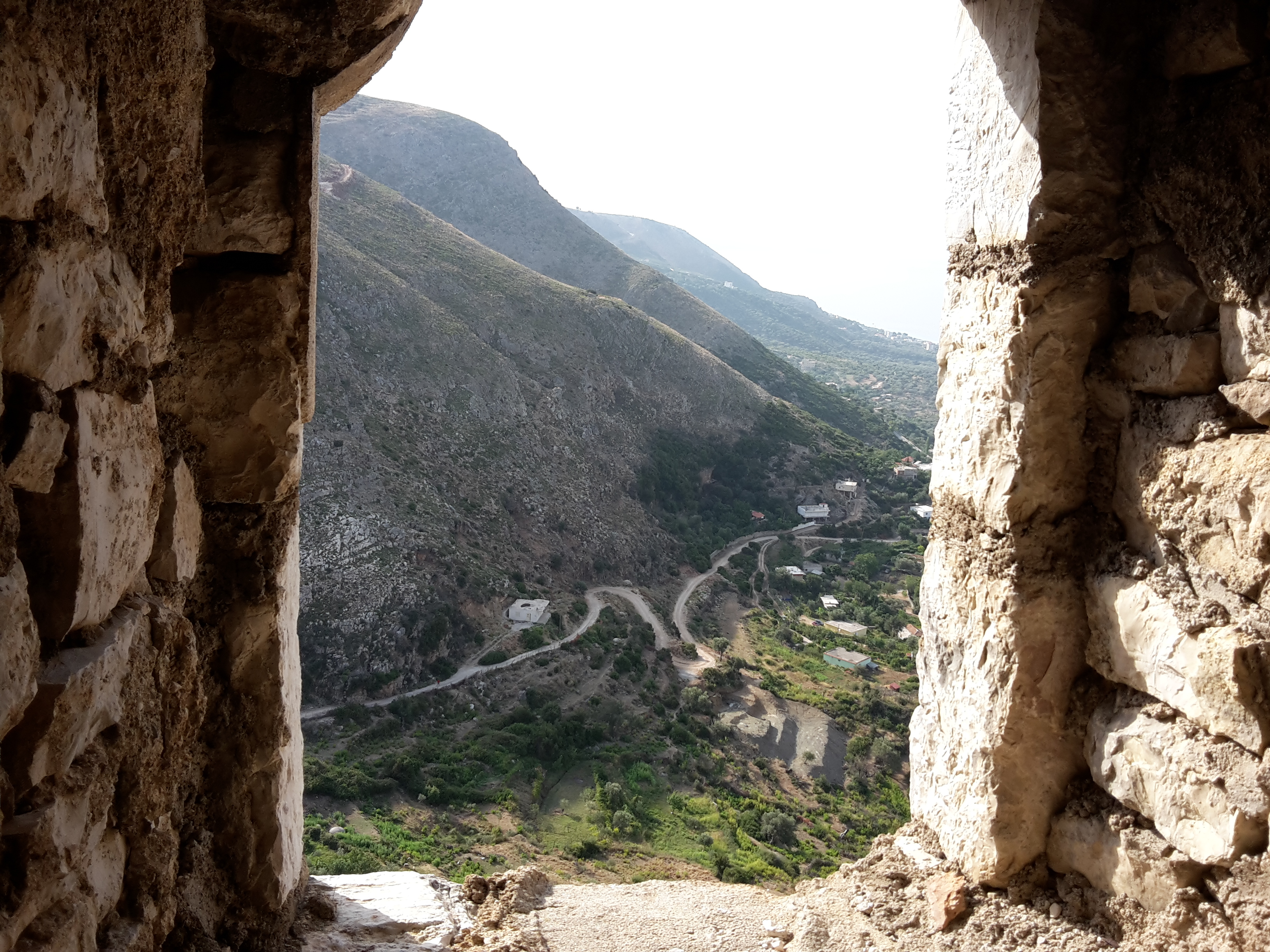
View from the inside of the castle.

The site is first mentioned in the early 13th century, when archbishop Demetrios Chomatenos wrote of the "archonship of Sopotos", part of the region of Vagenetia. In 1258, the Despot of Epirus Michael II Komnenos Doukas gave the castle along with Buthrotum and the island of Corfu as dowry for his daughter Helena to Manfred, King of Sicily. It came back under Epirote control soon thereafter, before being once again ceded by Nikephoros I Komnenos Doukas to Charles I of Anjou in 1279. The area returned again to Epirote hands in the subsequent decades, but in the Epirote rebellion against Palaiologan Byzantine rule in 1338–39, it remained loyal to Emperor Andronikos III Palaiologos.

Following the Ottoman conquest, a cadaster from 1431 lists Sopot with 60 households, and as capital of a nahiye. In 1456, troops of King Alfonso V of Aragon were operating in the area of Sobato against the Ottomans. In 1470 it was under Venetian control, under the jurisdiction of the governor of Corfu; at the end of the Ottoman–Venetian War of 1463–1479, the Ottomans laid claim to it and apparently received it. In 1481 Albanians led by Gjon Kastrioti II invaded Southern Albania from Italy and captured the castle, but retreated in 1484. In 1488 the local Albanian population rebelled against Ottoman rule. In the 16th century Venetians retook Sopot under control, though it lost it later to local rebels. Its last ruler was Ali Pasha of Yanina until it was abandoned.

The walls of the castle, which follow the ancient fortifications, survive. In the interior, the medieval fortress was divided through a wall in two. Triangular towers were added later, probably during the middle Byzantine period. In the interior of the castle stand ruins of various buildings and cisterns.

== See also ==
- List of castles in Albania
- Tourism in Albania

== Sources ==
- Akademia e Shkencave e Shqipërisë (2002). Historia e popullit shqiptar (in Albanian). Vol. 1. Tirana, Albania: Botimet Toena. ISBN 978-99927-1-622-9.
- Soustal, Peter; Koder, Johannes (1981). Tabula Imperii Byzantini, Band 3: Nikopolis und Kephallēnia (in German). Vienna: Verlag der Österreichischen Akademie der Wissenschaften. ISBN 3-7001-0399-9.
