= Hajji Bendo Mosque =

Former mosque in Himara, Vlorë County, Albania

- Xhamia e Haxhi Bendos
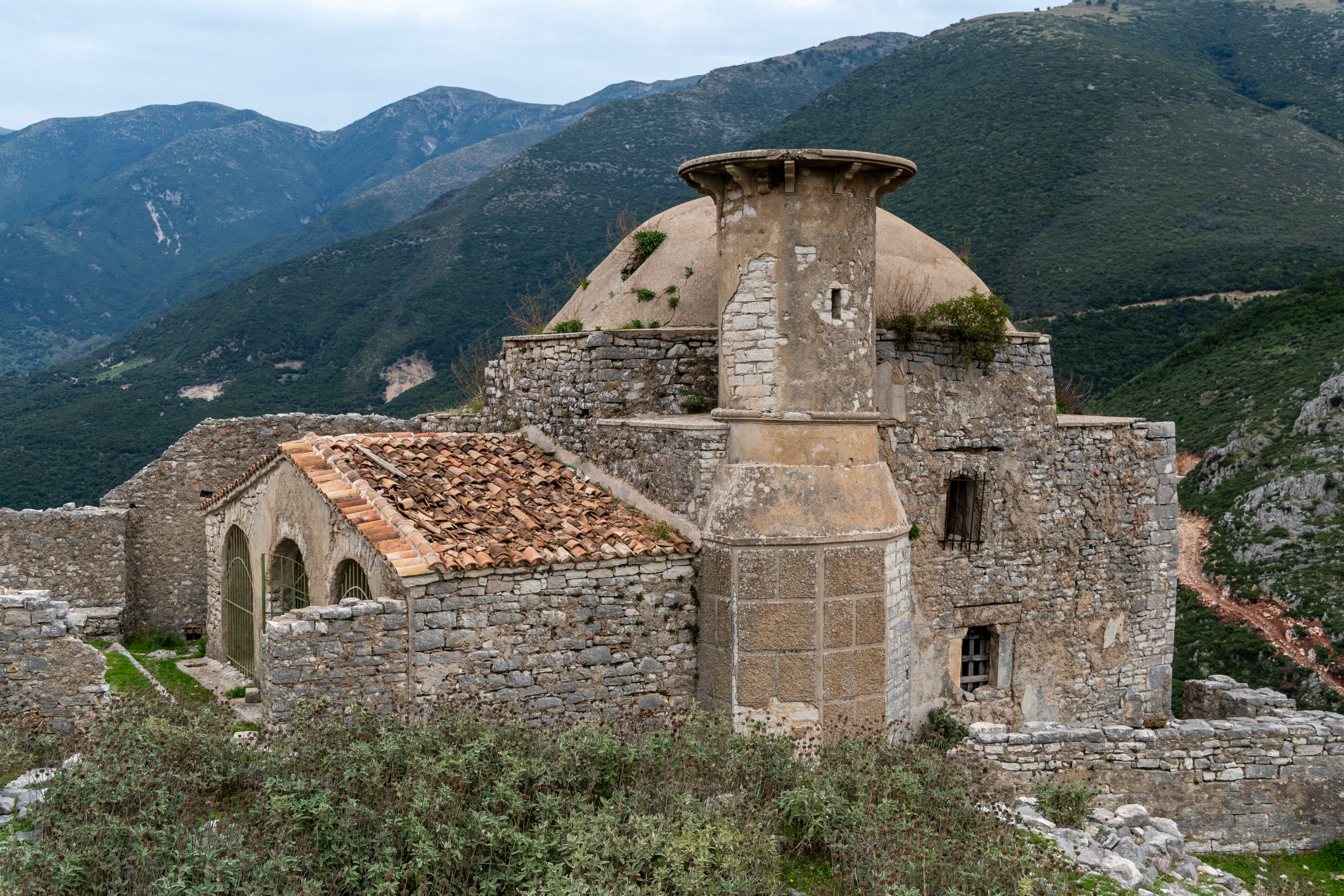
- Ruins of the former mosque

- Location of the former mosque in Albania

Religion
- Affiliation: Sunni Islam (former)
- Ecclesiastical or organizational status: Mosque (16th century–c. 1967)
- Status: Destroyed (ruinous state)

Location
- Location: Borsh Castle, Himarë, Vlorë County
- Country: Albania
- Interactive map of Hajji Bendo Mosque
- Coordinates: 40°04′11″N 19°51′24″E

Architecture
- Type: Islamic architecture
- Destroyed: c. 1967

Specifications
- Dome: 1 (since destroyed)
- Minaret: 1 (since destroyed)

Cultural Monument of Albania
- Official name: Hajji Bendo Mosque

The Hajji Bendo Mosque (Albanian: Xhamia e Haxhi Bendos) or Haji Bedo Mosque (Xhamia e Sopotit) is an Ottoman-era former Sunni mosque, that was built before the 17th century inside the Borsh Castle on the Sopot hill of Himara, Albania. The former mosque was badly damaged in the 20th century by the Greeks, further damaged during the Communist dictatorship of Enver Hoxha in 1967, and remains in a ruined state. The former mosque was designated as a Cultural Monument of Albania.

== Overview ==
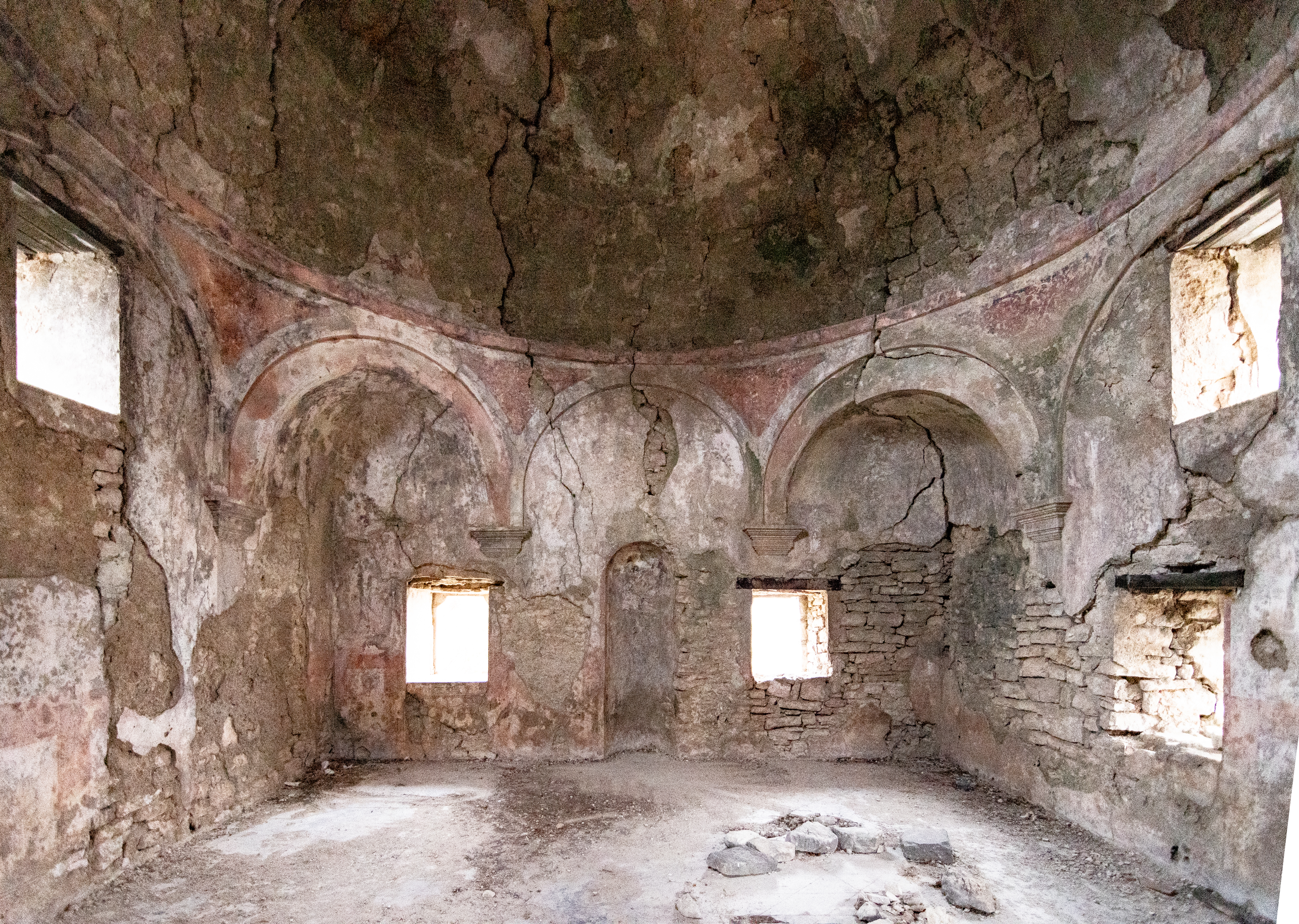
Mihrab and remains of the old paintings which deteriorated due to neglect in the 20th and 21st century

The dome, which used to be of red tiles, is now covered with concrete. The Muslim frescoes and nakkaşlık works inside are endangered. Half the stone minaret is still missing until today.

The Hajji Bendo Mosque was built before the 17th century and named after the vassal of Ali Pasha of Janina, Haxhi Bendo. After being destroyed in the 20th century by the Greeks, since Communism the mosque did not got rebuilt for the local Albanian population under the reign of post-Communist regime, while most of the Byzantine-Greek churches and monasteries of the region get rebuilt.

The building is one of the works of Ottoman architecture in Albania. Today it is an important tourist spot in Borshi village.

The Hajji Bendo is located in the Lukovë administrative unit of Himara Municipality of Vlorë County. It is one of the Ottoman mosques that was damaged and closed during the dictatorship of Enver Hoxha. During the reign of the People's Socialist Republic of Albania, many of the Ottoman mosques were destroyed and replaced by Socialist and Modernist architecture.

Its reconstruction and the restoration of the mosque as a whole did not get the approval by law from the municipality (bashkia) of Himara.

== See also ==
- Islam in Albania
- List of mosques in Albania
- List of Religious Cultural Monuments of Albania
