= Himarë Castle =

Castle in Himarë in southern Albania

- Kalaja e Himarës
- Himarë, Albania
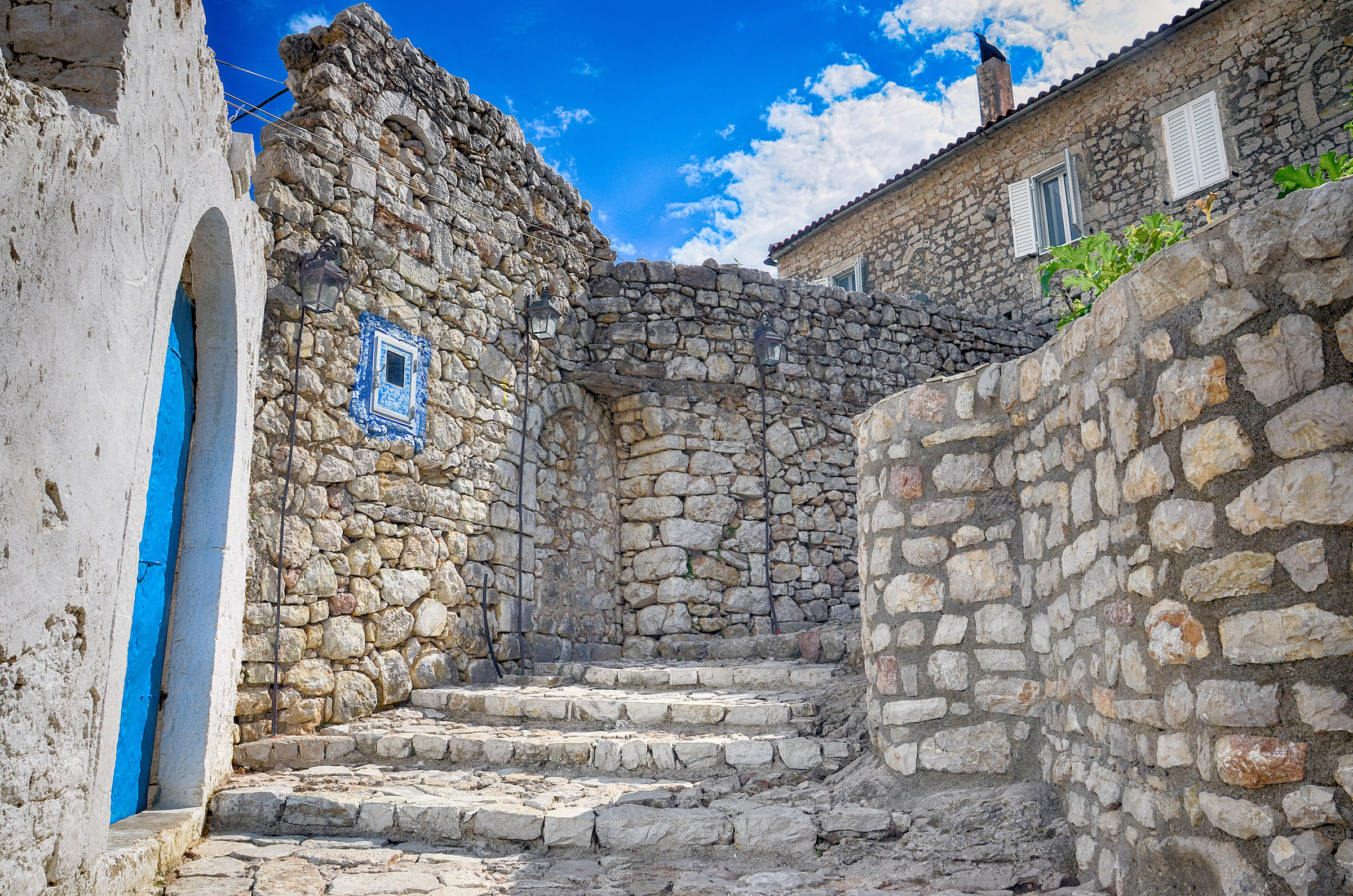
- Himarë Castle

Site information
- Owner: Albania
- Controlled by: Chaonians (Epirus); Roman Empire; Byzantine Empire Despotate of Epirus; Kingdom of Albania; Republic of Venice; Ottoman Empire Albania; Italy Albania
- Open to the public: Yes

Location
- Location within Albania
- Coordinates: 40.11771°N 19.73166°E

Himarë Castle (Albanian: Kalaja e Himarës), locally also known as Kastro is a castle in Himarë, in southern Albania.

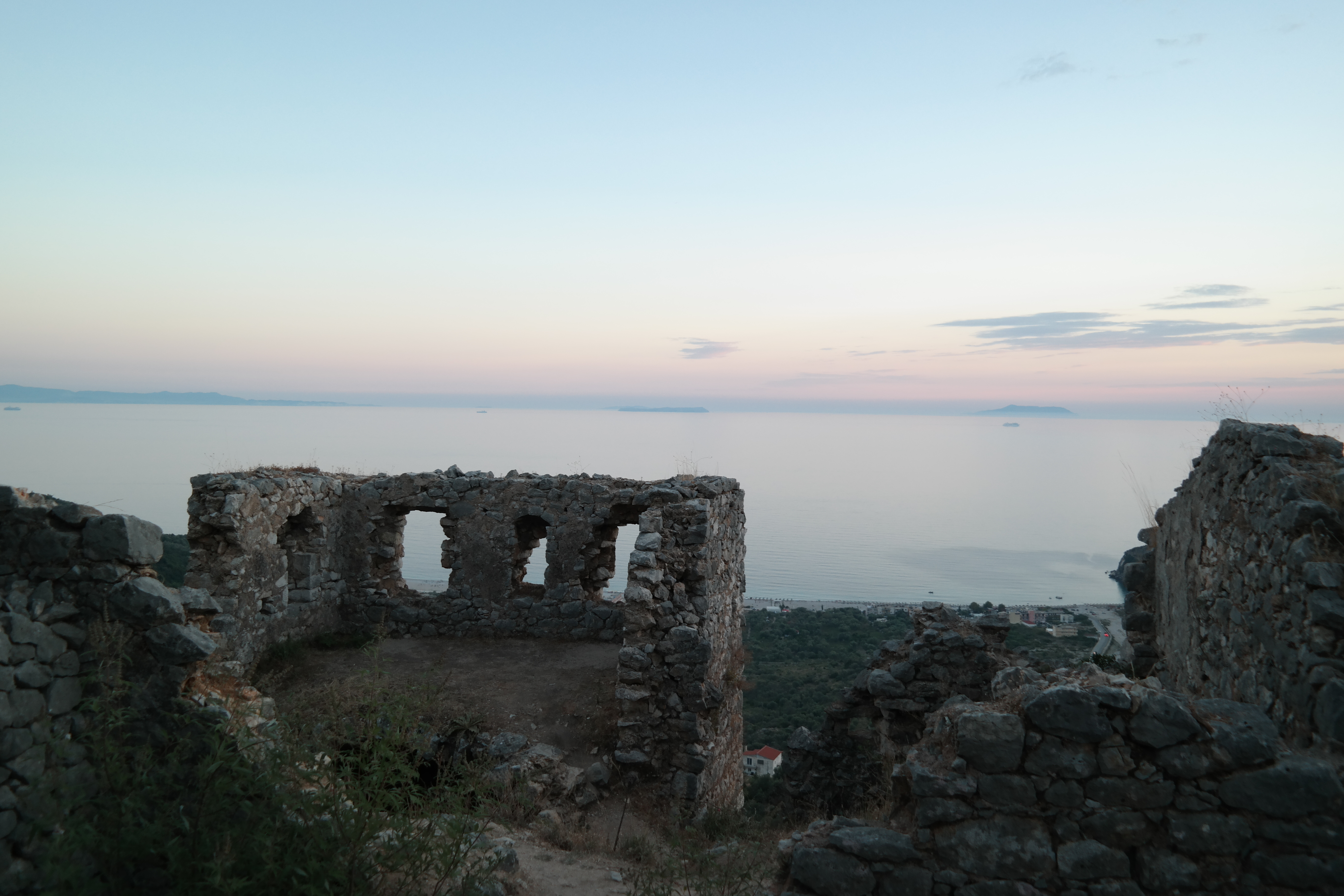
View towards Livadhi beach as seen from the castle

It is one of the main attractions located in the old town of Himara. The Chaonian castle in Himara appears to belong to the set of the earliest Chaonian fortifications. Its ancient walls probably date to the 5th-4th centuries BC. There are also a number of Orthodox churches there such as Panagia Kassopitra where parts of the western side of the ancient wall are preserved inside it.

Another church inside the castle is that of the All Saints. According to a local legend when the Greek Orthodox missionary Kosmas visited Himara in 1779, he proposed to the locals to destroy part of that church in order to build a Greek school with this material.

The church of Saint Michael also inside the castle was erected during the 13th century.

The old mansion of Spyros Spyromilios is also among the main attractions found inside the citadel.
