= Vokopolë Castle =

- Kalaja e Vokopolës ose Kalaja e Plënckës (Albanian)
- Location within Albania
- Location: Vokopolë, Uravajgurore, Berat, Shqipëri

Site notes
- Current use: Open to the public
- Owner: Albania

Cultural Monument of Albania
- Designated: 8 January 1977

Vokopolë Castle (Albanian: Kalaja e Vokopolës, but also known as Kalaja e Plënckës or Kalaja e Ali Pashë Tepelenës) is a castle in Berat, Albania. It is on a hill at 765 m over the sea level, northwest of Vokopolë, in the Ballolli region, close to the city of Berat. It is a monument of cultural heritage, recognized as such on 8 January 1977 in the Berat County, Albania.
