= Persqopi Castle =

Ancient fortress in Albania

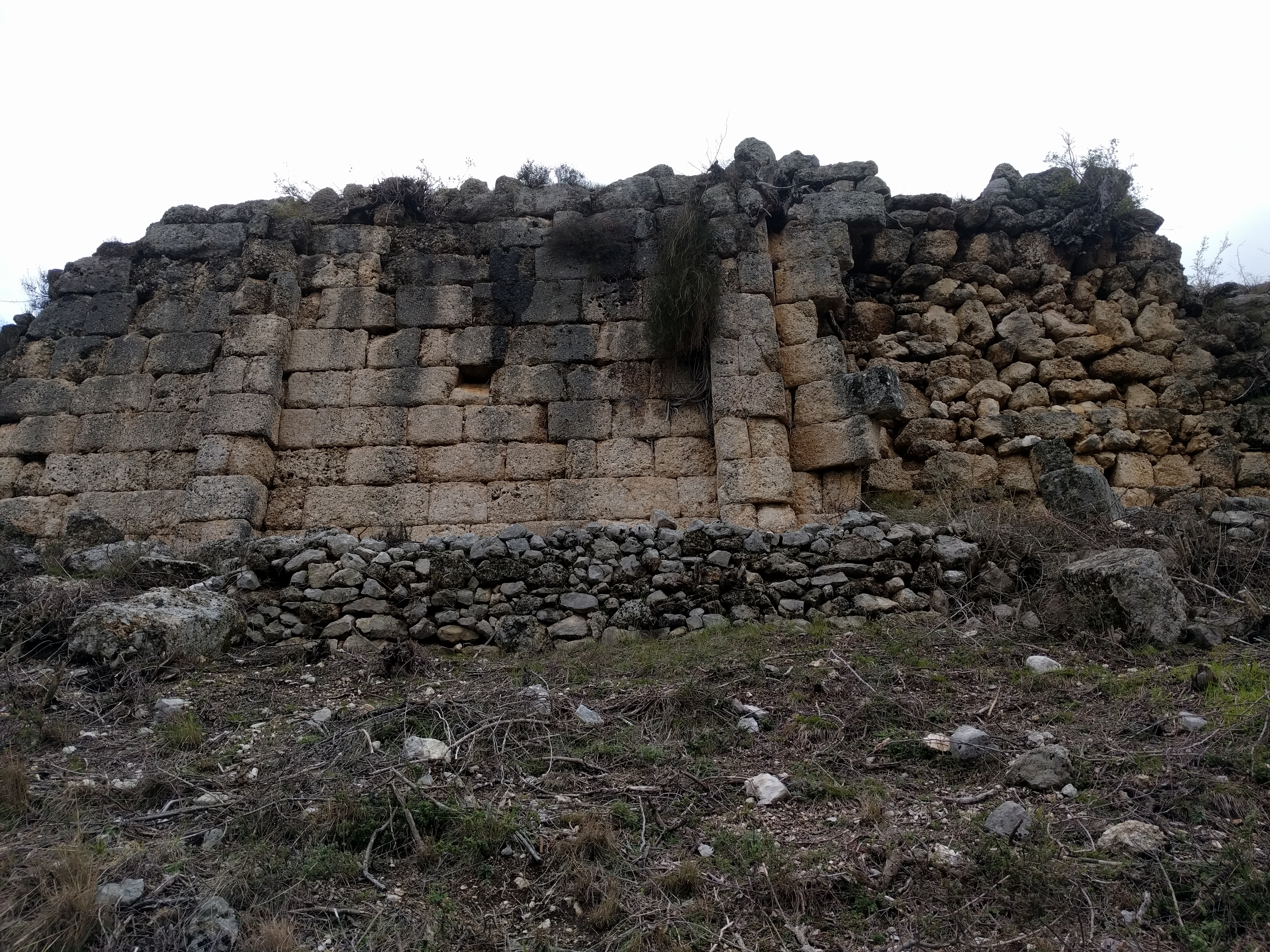
View of the walls from below

The Persqopi Castle is a 4th century BC era Illyrian ancient city, located near modern Tirana, Albania.

== History ==
The Persqopi settlement can be dated to the second half of the 4th century BC. No ancient author mentions it by its Perqopi current name. It is thought to have been lived by the Illyrian tribe of the Parthini. The ancient city is on one side of the Vila Mountain, which is the last peak of the Krrabë mountain range. At 590 m over the level of sea, its strategic position facilitated the control of a large territory of the roads around the mountain. Its fortifying wall is one of the best preserved in the Albanian territory, and is 60 m long and 7 m high. There are 10 lines of stones. The entrance is 2.6 m large and is the only one that can still be seen today.

There are two adjacent walls (an external and an internal one). The external wall is 2m thick and the internal one 1m thick. The connection of the two walls to one another is through perpendicular additional walls, built at a 5.6 – 6.1 m distance from each another. The empty spaces created between the walls are filled with soil and stones of different dimensions, which creates an emplecton type of wall. Besides the ancient walls, in Persqop are conserved traces of multiple dwellings, as well as remains of an ancient tomb. In addition, there is an aqueduct, which provided water from the Vila Mountain.

== Preservation efforts ==
Funding became available to the Albanian Fund for Development in 2011 for a feasibility study to build a road to the site, as well as to make the site an archaeological attraction, however until now neither project has been completed.
