= Tirana Plain =

Coordinates: 41°23′33″N 19°42′58″E

The Tirana Plain is a plain in Central Albania, part of the Western Lowlands, where its main populated center is the capital city of Tirana.
