= Ana Carla Maza =

Cuban musician (born 1995)

Ana Carla Maza (born 14 June 1995) is a Cuban cellist, singer, composer, arranger and record producer. Her music combines classical training with jazz, French chanson, and Cuban and Latin American traditions.

== Early life and education ==
Maza was born in Alamar, Havana, in the residential complex known as the “Edificio de los Chilenos”. She subsequently grew up in Bahía, Hershey, between Havana and Matanzas, and Guanabacoa. Her father is the Chilean pianist and composer Carlos Maza, also known as Newen Tahiel, and her mother is the Cuban guitarist and choir director Mirza Sierra. Her sister, Hilda Camila Maza, is a violinist.

She began learning piano at five with Miriam Valdés, the sister of pianist Chucho Valdés, and began studying the cello at eight at the Guanabacoa conservatory. She gave her first performance in Havana at the age of ten. In 2007, her family left Cuba and settled in Spain.

As a teenager she participated in her father's projects and recorded with her family on albums including En Familia, Quererte and Pueblo del Sol. At thirteen, she won first prize in the 14th L'Arjau music performance competition, the special Francesc Dagà prize and first prize in the Cuerdas de Barcelona competition. At fourteen, she toured as soloist with the Orquesta Sinfónica Europea Mediterránea under conductor Cristian Florea, performing works by Camille Saint-Saëns and Pyotr Ilyich Tchaikovsky.

In 2012, she moved to Paris. She studied cello at the Conservatoire à rayonnement régional de Paris with Raphaël Pidoux and Hélène Dautry, continued at the Pôle supérieur d'enseignement artistique Paris Boulogne-Billancourt, and studied musicology at Paris-Sorbonne University. In 2014, she accompanied Jean-Louis Aubert on cello and vocals during the Aubert chante Houellebecq tour in French Zénith arenas. She later received a 22-month creative residency at the Cité internationale des arts.

== Solo career ==
Encouraged by cellist Vincent Ségal, whom she met in 2011, Maza developed a repertoire for voice and cello. She performed with him at Jazz à Porquerolles and the Opéra de Lyon. She self-produced the live album Solo Acoustic Concert in 2016. Her first studio album, La Flor, was released in 2020 and combined original compositions with influences from French chanson, bossa nova and Cuban music.

She has also contributed to film music. Her cello can be heard in Souleymane Cissé's O Ka, presented at the Cannes Film Festival, and Pengfei's Underground Fragrance, presented at the Giornate degli Autori at the Venice Film Festival.

The album Bahía was released in February 2022. Recorded acoustically in Barcelona, it was performed from beginning to end in a single take. Its tour comprised more than 150 concerts in approximately fifteen countries.

In 2023, Maza wrote, arranged and produced Caribe, recorded with a sextet and featuring saxophone and trombone. The Transglobal World Music Chart named it the best album from North America, Central America and the Caribbean for the 2023–2024 season, and it was one of three nominees for world music album at the 2024 Victoires du Jazz. The Caribe tour brought her career total to more than 400 concerts in more than 25 countries.

The official music video for Caribe, released on 15 March 2024, had received more than two million YouTube views by September 2026. The videos for Las Primaveras and Te me fuiste had each passed one million views, while her official channel had accumulated more than 8.5 million views.

Maza has performed at festivals and venues including Jazz à la Villette, Jazz sous les pommiers, Jazz à Vienne, Bergamo Jazz Festival, Blue Note Milano and the London Jazz Festival. In 2022, she opened Chucho Valdés's La creación concert at the Royal Festival Hall. In 2025, she performed Caribe at the ancient theatre during Jazz à Vienne and at Cadogan Hall during the London Jazz Festival.

Her television appearances include Save the Date on Rai 5, Via dei Matti n°0 with Stefano Bollani and Valentina Cenni on Rai 3, and two editions of Radio2 Social Club on Rai 2. In Spain, she appeared on Culturas 2 on La 2/TVE, performed A tomar café on Col·lapse on TV3, and performed twice on Canal Sur's La tarde, aquí y ahora in 2025. In France, Michel Drucker received her on Vivement dimanche on France 3 on 22 March 2026 for the release of Alamar.

In Japan, she was the central performer in Amami, an episode of the music-documentary series Mirador: Zekkei o kiku (ミラドール 絶景を聴く), produced for Japan's public broadcaster NHK and directed by Azusa Maruyama. Filmed in the Amami Islands, the documentary follows her exploration of the archipelago's natural sounds and traditions; she composed its original music and performs it on cello and voice. The episode premiered on NHK BS8K on 29 March 2026 and was rebroadcast on NHK BS Premium 4K on 2 July.

Her self-written, composed and produced album Alamar was released on 27 March 2026, preceded by the singles Corazoncito mío on 27 February and Habanera on 13 March.

On 19 July 2026 at Sanremo's Auditorium Franco Alfano, she premiered Alamar Symphonic Suite, an orchestral work for which she wrote the music and symphonic arrangements. On 29 August, she appeared with Jovanotti at the Jova Summer Party in Palermo, performing her composition Ma chérie before approximately 50,000 people.

In 2026, Arte broadcast the profile Ana Carla Maza, un violoncelle rebelle. Her first headline concert at the Olympia in Paris is scheduled for 25 May 2027.

== Discography ==
=== Solo albums ===
- Solo Acoustic Concert (2016)
- La Flor (2020)
- Bahía (2022)
- Caribe (2023)
- Caribe Deluxe (2025)
- Alamar (2026)

=== Recordings with Carlos Maza and family ===
- En Familia (2009)
- Quererte (2010)
- Pueblo del Sol (2012)

== Awards and nominations ==
- First prize, 14th L'Arjau performance competition, and the special Francesc Dagà prize
- First prize, Cuerdas de Barcelona competition
- Latin American Impact Award, Yacht Club de Monaco (2024)
- Victoires du Jazz nomination for world music album, for Caribe (2024)
- Transglobal World Music Chart best album from North America, Central America and the Caribbean, for Caribe (2024)
