= Krrabë =

- Administrative unit
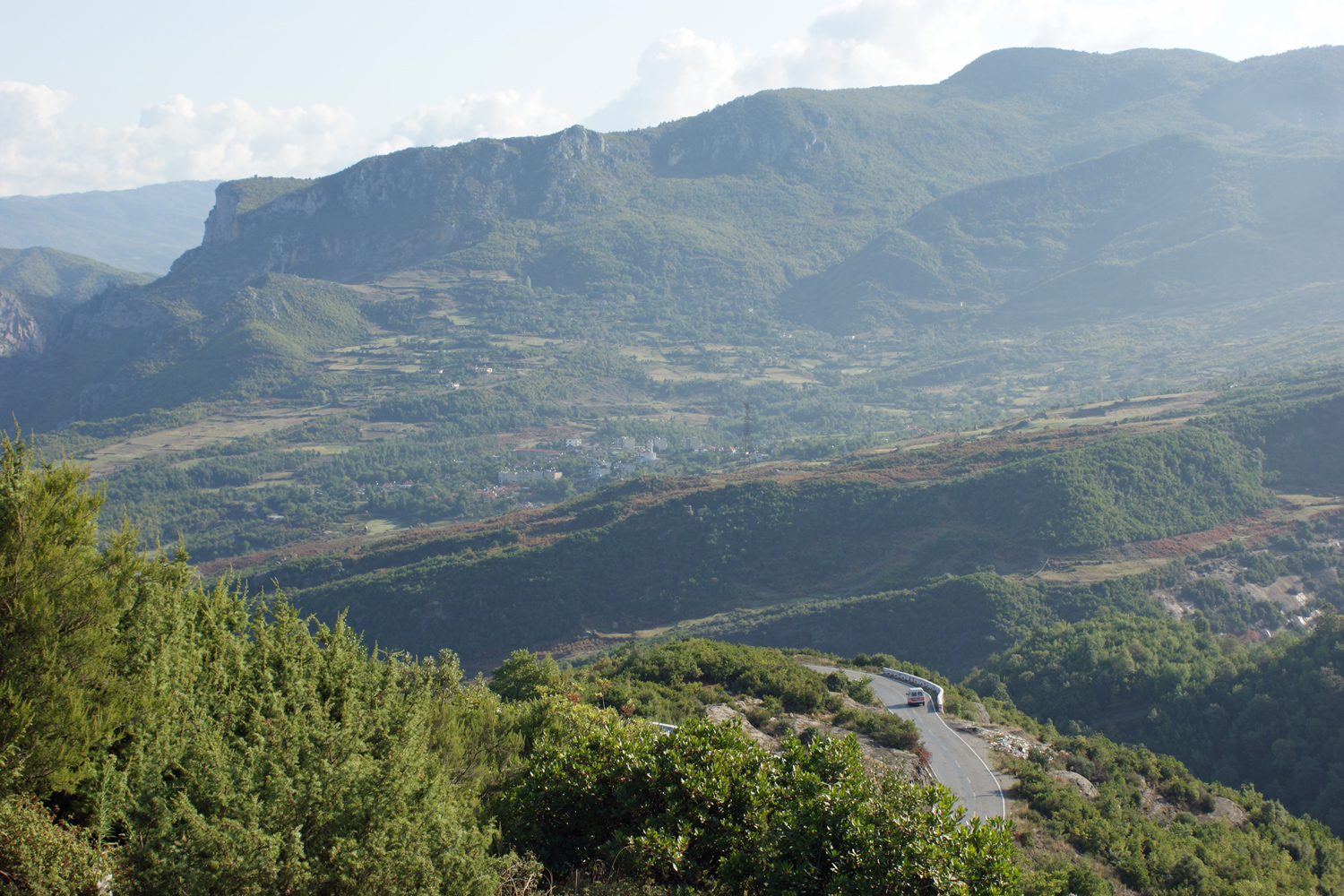

- Location within Albania
- Coordinates: 41°13′N 19°58′E
- Country: Albania
- County: Tirana
- Municipality: Tirana
  - Administrative unit: 14.45 km^{2} (5.58 sq mi)
- Elevation: 410 m (1,350 ft)

Population (2023)
  - Administrative unit: 2,023
  - Administrative unit density: 140.0/km^{2} (362.6/sq mi)
- Time zone: UTC+1 (CET)
  - Summer (DST): UTC+2 (CEST)
- Postal Code: 1049
- Area Code: (0)49

Krrabë is a town and a former municipality in the Tirana County, central Albania. At the 2015 local government reform it became a subdivision of the municipality Tirana. The population as of the 2023 census is 2,023.

Historical population
Year	Pop.	±%
1989	2,392	—
2001	2,493	+4.2%
2011	2,343	−6.0%
2023	2,023	−13.7%

== History ==
The village has been inhabited since ancient times by Illyrians who built the Persqopi Castle near Krrabë.
