= Drino Valley =

Valley in southern Albania and northwestern Greece

Coordinates: 40°17′12″N 20°02′32″E

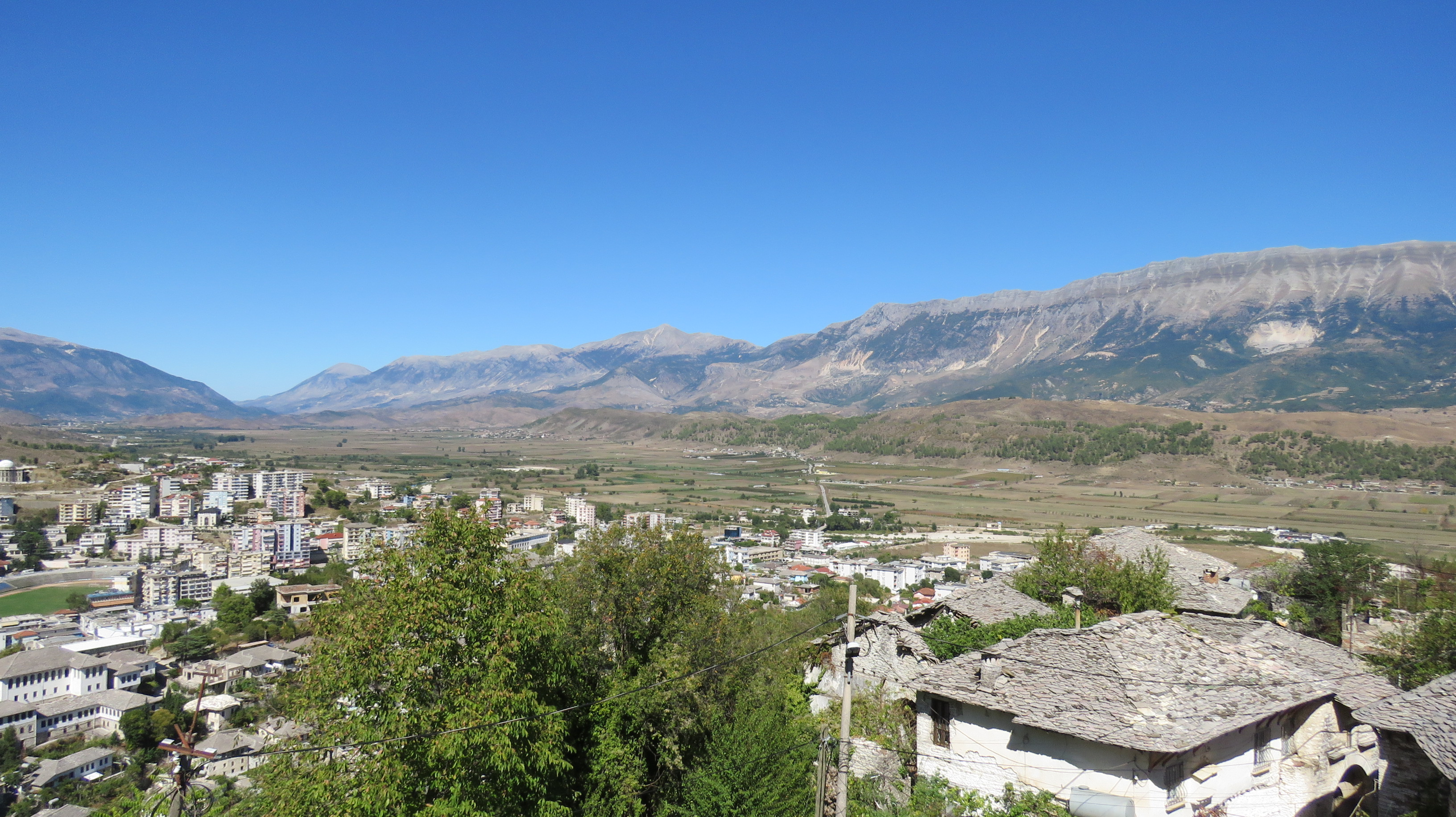
The Drino Valley seen from Gjirokastër

The Drino valley (Albanian: Lugina e Drinos, Greek: Κοιλάδα Δρίνου) is a valley in southern Albania and northwestern Greece along the Drino river.

Drino valley contains several monasteries, the most important of which dedicated to Saints Quiricus and Julietta.
