= Vasa Koilaniou =

Vasa Βάσα
- Village
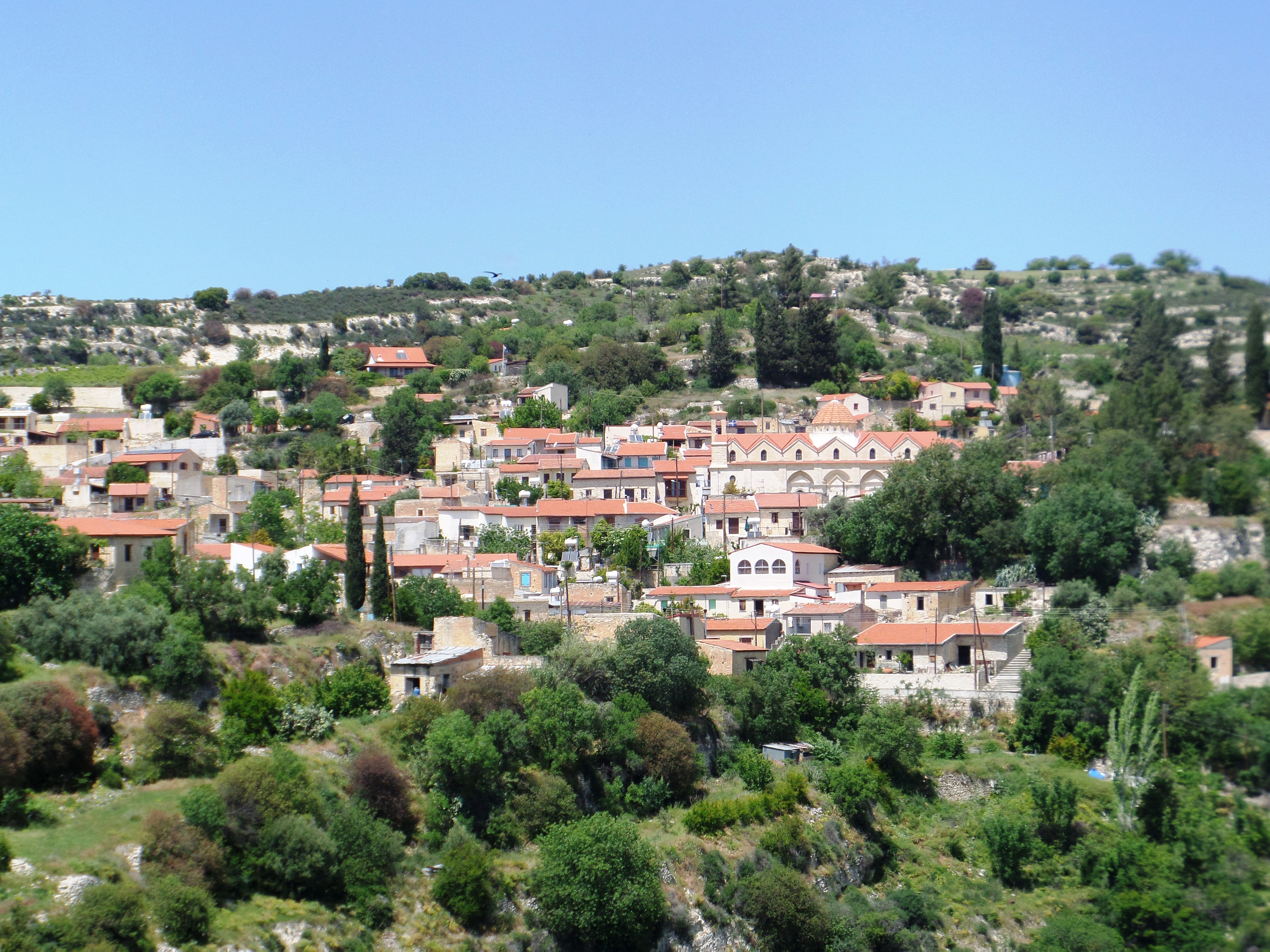

- Location in Cyprus
- Coordinates: 34°49′59″N 32°47′28″E
- Country: Cyprus
- District: Limassol District

Population (2001)
  - Total: 118
- Time zone: UTC+2 (EET)
  - Summer (DST): UTC+3 (EEST)

Vasa Koilaniou (Greek: Βάσα Κοιλανίου) is a village in the Limassol District of Cyprus, located 4 km south of Omodos.

== Location ==
Vasa is located 35 kilometres from the city of Limassol. It is built at an altitude of 760 metres above sea level. To the west it borders Arsos, to the north-east Omodos, to the south-east Potamiou and Kissoúsa, and to the south Malia.

== Natural Environment ==
Most of the village's area consists of cultivated land planted with vineyards. Vasa is one of the wine-producing villages of the Limassol district. Raisin production is also significant in the village.

== Name ==
The name of the village derives from the ancient Greek word Bassa or Bissa, meaning "wooded valley". Over the centuries, the letter beta in Greek came to be pronounced as v rather than b, resulting in the current form: "Vasa". In Arcadia, in the Peloponnese, there was an ancient settlement called Bassae, where the Temple of Apollo Epicurius (today a UNESCO World Heritage Site) was located. It is possible that the name Bassa is connected with the settlement of Cyprus by Arcadians. This view is reinforced by the existence of an ancient sanctuary of Apollo in the village.

== Sourcing ==
- Καρούζης, Γιώργος (2001). Περιδιαβάζοντας την Κύπρο: Λεμεσός (πόλη και επαρχία) [Wandering Around Cyprus: Limassol (City and District)] (πρώτη ed.). Λευκωσία: ΣΕΛΑΣ Κεντρο Μελετων Ερευνων & Εκδοσεων. pp. 231–233. ISBN 9963-566-67-7.
