= Neophytos Rodinos =

17th-century Greek Cypriot scholar

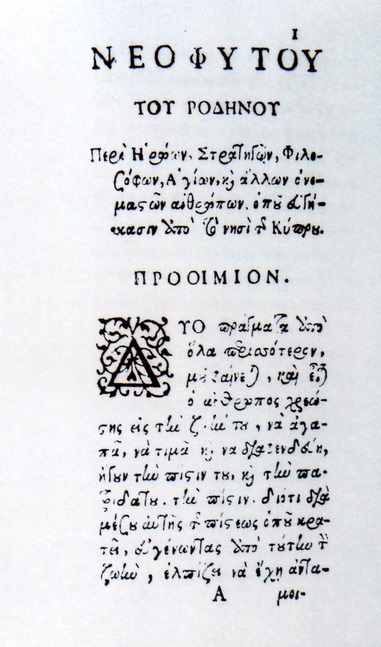
First page of Rodinos' work: "On Heroes, Generals, Philosophers, Saints and other noble men, where they emigrated from the island of Cyprus", 1659

Neophytos Rodinos (Greek: Νεόφυτος Ροδινός; 1576/7–1659) was a 17th-century Greek Cypriot scholar and Catholic missionary. Born in Ottoman Cyprus, he later converted from Eastern Orthodoxy to Catholicism and undertook missionary work preaching in Italy, Poland, Greece, Turkey and Albania. Rodinos was a professor of classical Greek with enormous educational activity until his death, using vernacular Greek speech in his proselytizing missions. He was crucial in maintaining cultural ties between his native Cyprus and the wider Greek world as well as preserving a distinctive Greek literary and philosophical tradition.

== Life ==
=== Early life ===
Neophytos Rodinos was born in 1576/7 at the village of Potamiou, in Ottoman Cyprus. His father Solomon Rodinos (1515–1575/6) was a scholar and poet who composed the threnos "Lament of Cyprus" which described the Ottoman conquest of Cyprus (1571).

During the 1590s, Rodinos became a student of scholar Leontios Efstratios, but he soon moved to Candia, Crete, probably in search for a better education. He attended classes at the metochion of Saint Catherine's Monastery of Sinai and in 1596 was ordained a monk there. For the rest of his career, Rodinos signed his works under the full name "Neophytos Rodinos Cypriot Sinaitis".

On the recommendation of scholar Ioannis Morezinos, abbot of the metochion of Sinai, he went to Venice, where he became a student of Maximos Margunios and worked as his subordinate from 1599 to 1602. Margunios was a professor at the Greek School in Venice at that time.

=== Education and conversion to Catholicism ===
After Margounios' death in Venice in 1602, Rodinos converted to the Roman Catholic Church. In the period 1602–1607, he returned to Cyprus where he set up a tutoring center in a monastery, but he encountered opposition to this initiative and was forced to abandon it. In 1607, at the suggestion of Nikephoros Chartophylax, the abbot of the monastery of Saint John the Theologian in Patmos, he attended classes at the Pontifical Greek College of Saint Athanasius in Rome. There, he studied Greek, Latin, and Logic, and graduated in 1610. In this period, he had special relations with scholars Gabriel Severos, Georgios Korresios, and Frangiskos Kokkos.

Rodinos most likely converted to Catholicism in the spring of 1607 in Venice. As with many Greeks who traveled to western Europe in this period, a passive drift into the Catholic faith may be more accurate a description of his progress than a conscious conversion. He then enlisted in the Catholic congregation Propaganda Fide (now the Congregation for the Evangelization of Peoples). Rodinos became a tireless worker for the Union of the Roman Catholic and Orthodox churches by the apparatus of the Propaganda Fide.

From 1610 to 1616, Rodinos continued his philosophical and theological studies at the University of Salamanca, where he became a professor of classical Greek and transcribed numerous Greek codices. He was not the first Greek scholar to teach at Salamanca, since Paranomaris did so some decades earlier. He also attended courses at the University of Coimbra. He also became active in the Dauphiné region of France.

=== Missionary and educational work ===
Rodinos went to Poland and in the following years was ordained a priest by a bishop of the Ruthenian Uniate Church. In 1620, he visited various Greek regions in the Ottoman Empire, settling in Sicily, where he taught Greek at Mezzojuso from 1622 to 1625. He was then sent to Apulia for missionary work, and returned to Rome in 1629. He visited Naples frequently (in 1630, 1643, 1645, and 1655), where he taught Greek at the University of Naples Federico II while being the parish priest of the Neapolitan Greek Orthodox Church.

Other stations in his life were Patmos and Ainos. Based on autobiographical accounts, he also visited the Sinai Peninsula and Alexandria, Egypt.

Approximately between 1628 and 1648 he developed missionary activity in Ottoman ruled areas, especially in Epirus. Rodinos used the vernacular Greek speech during his proselytizing missions. He visited the region four to five times during this period.

In general, he went through areas of Epirus (today's southern Albania and northwestern Greece) such as Himarë, Ioannina, Pogoniani, trying to set up schools and undertaking educational work. Rodinos unsuccessfully attempted to found a school in Ioannina. Though various contradicting accounts about Rodinos's foundation of educational institutions exist, modern scholarship agrees that in 1627 he founded a school in Himarë as part of his mission, the first Catholic school in southern Albania. Lessons were taught in the Greek language there. Rodinos also passed through Nivicë, Albania, where he founded a school in 1648. Rodinos was assisted by other Cypriot missionaries especially in Himarë such as Athanasios Konstantzos, Kalimeras, and Ioannis Chrysadifas, who were also active in various Greek-inhabited regions.

In 1639, while in Himarë, Rodinos reported to the Catholic mission that he planned to translate liturgical books in Albanian, assisted by an Albanian-speaking priest. His missionary work gained popularity and he was targeted by the Greek Orthodox bishop of Ioannina. The suffragan Orthodox bishop of Himarë was ordered to use all possible means to stop Catholic missionary work. Greek Orthodox priests attacked and excommunicated those who were drawn to Catholic missionaries. Rodinos reported in 1642 that his life was in danger in a very hostile environment.

Rodinos also managed to distribute all copies of the first edition of his work Σύνοψις (Synopsis) in Greece (across Thessaly, Epirus, and especially in Ioannina) as well as in Albania. Although he also aimed at translating a two-page catechesis (doctrina christiana) to Albanian in cooperation with his student Papa Demetrios, a priest of Albanian origin from Dhërmi, he was dissuaded from doing so because the Propaganda Fide had already printed one earlier. In the following years, his newly printed works – the second edition of Synopsis, Περί Εξομολογήσεως (On Confession) and Πνευματική Πανοπλία (Spiritual Armor) – were circulated in Epirus and other areas of the Ottoman Empire. In the region of Himarë he distributed those books himself.

Rodinos, being a Greek scholar educated in western Europe, was well received by the Christian population in Epirus since he was also active in undertaking educational initiatives. On the other hand, the Greek Orthodox leadership saw him as a dangerous propagandist of the Roman Catholic Church. As such, the Ecumenical Patriarch, Cyril Loukaris, became his main antagonist. Therefore, although Rodinos was invited in 1633 by Parthenios, the metropolitan bishop of Ioannina, he had to decline the invitation. The same reasons also led Rodinos to decline an invitation from the bishop of Paramythia, Porphyrios. In his correspondence, he expresses his joy when being informed that the metropolitan bishops of Adrianoupolis and Chalcedon had attempted to dethrone Loukaris.

=== Later life ===
Rodinos returned to Cyprus in 1656. He died there in 1659 at the Kykkos Monastery. The year of his death, the first edition of his last work was published in Rome: Περί ηρώων, στρατηγών, φιλοσόφων, αγίων και άλλων ονομαστών ανδρών, οπού ευγήκασιν από το νησί της Κύπρου (On Heroes, Generals, Philosophers, Saints and other noble men, where they emigrated from the island of Cyprus, 1659). It was most probably composed shortly before that year. The work comprises a historical treatise and collection of speeches inspired by the history of Cyprus. In this context the Rodinos projects notable spiritual figures of the local past, both ancient and Christian. It is considered one of the first essays written in vernacular Greek, and played a decisive role in shaping the national consciousness of the Greek diaspora during the following years.

== Legacy ==
Rodinos generally believed that support from western Europe to overthrow Ottoman rule would be possible if the native populations in Greece accepted the Roman Catholic Church.

Rodinos is regarded as one of the most important Cypriot prose writers and among the most prominent Cypriot scholars of the seventeenth century. His work is particularly notable for his exceptional ability to handle the early modern Greek language. However, much of his extensive body of work still has yet to receive systematic scholarly editing and analysis.

Rodinos' writings played a significant role in the dissemination of Catholicism among the Greek-speaking Orthodox of the East and Italy during the transitional period at the beginning of the seventeenth century. He also contributed to maintaining Cypriot intellectual and cultural connections with the wider Greek literary world and its philosophical traditions.

He is also considered a precursor to figures such as Frangiskos Skoufos, Ilias Miniatis, Rigas Feraios and Kosmas the Aetolian.

== Works ==
In addition to his theological works published by the Propaganda Congregation, he wrote a large number of other pieces. His work is generally divided into three categories:

- Ecclesiastical works, including catechisms, prayer books, confession books, and martyrologies
- Logographic works, essays and sermons:
  - Περί Εξομολογήσεως (On Confession, 1630)
  - Πνευματική Πανοπλία (Spiritual Armor, 1630)
  - Άσκησις Πνευματική (Spiritual Asceticism, 1641)
  - Απόκρισις εις την Επιστολήν Ιωάννου Πρεσβυτέρου και Ρεφενδαρίου της Εκκλησίας της Παραμυθιάς (Response to the Letter of John the Elder and Refendario of the Church of Paramythia, 1659)
  - Περί ηρώων, στρατηγών, φιλοσόφων, αγίων και άλλων ονομαστών ανδρών, οπού ευγήκασιν από το νησί της Κύπρου (On Heroes, Generals, Philosophers, Saints and other noble men, where they emigrated from the island of Cyprus, 1659).
- Translations:
  - Εγχειρίδιο και Μονολόγιο του Αυγουστίνου (Augustine's Manual and Monologue) and various synaxes

An unknown number of Rodinos' works and letters survive as manuscripts in several libraries, especially in the Vatican.

== See also ==
- Greek scholars in the Renaissance

== Sources ==
- Doja, Albert (2022). "Ecclesiastical Pressures and Language Politics: The Boundary Work of Albanian Language in the 17th-18th Centuries". Nationalities Papers. 50 (4): 742–769. doi:10.1017/nps.2021.55. S2CID 248275762.
- Kaplanis, Tassos A. (2015). "Νεόφυτος Ροδινός – Ιωακείμ Κύπριος: Λογοτεχνικές απεικονίσεις της Κύπρου και των ταυτοτητες στο 17° αι.*" [Neofytos Rodinos – Ioakeim Kyprios: Literary Depictions of Cyprus and Identities in the 17th c.]. Επετηρίδα Κέντρου Επιστημονικών Ερευνών (in Greek). 37: 283–310.
- Lubin, Matthew (2012). Aftermath of War: Cypriot Christians and Mediterranean Geopolitics, 1571-1625 (PhD). Chapel Hill, North Carolina: University of North Carolina at Chapel Hill. doi:10.17615/gm5f-ft36.
- Papageorgiou, Margarita (2013). ""Εισαγωγή" (για το έργο Περί ηρώων, στρατηγών, φιλοσόφων, αγίων και άλλων ονομαστών ανθρώπων, οπού εβγήκασιν από το νησί της Κύπρου του Νεόφυτου Ροδινού)" ["Introduction" (for the work On Heroes, Generals, Philosophers, Saints and Other Famous People Who Came from the Island of Cyprus by Neophytos Rodinos)] (PDF) (in Greek). Centre of Modern Greek Studies: Δημώδης Γραμματεία.
- Tsakiris, Vasileios (2009). Die gedruckten griechischen Beichtbücher zur Zeit der Türkenherrschaft : ihr kirchenpolitischer Entstehungszusammenhang und ihre Quellen [The printed Greek confessionals during the time of Turkish rule: Their ecclesiastical-political context and their sources] (in German). Berlin: Walter de Gruyter. ISBN 9783110212853.
- Tsirpanlis, Zaharias (1972). "Ο Νεόφυτος Ροδινός στην Ήπειρο" [Neophytos Rodinos in Epirus]. Epirotiki Estia (in Greek). 1. doi:10.26268/heal.uoi.9822.
- Voutsa, Styliani (2021). "Salamanca y helenismo. Intelectuales Griegos que Pasaron por la Ciudad de Salamanca a lo Largo de los Siglos" [Salamanca and Hellenism: Greek Intellectuals Who Passed Through the City of Salamanca Throughout the Centuries]. Fortunatae (in Spanish). 33: 227–236. doi:10.25145/j.fortunat.2021.33. ISSN 1131-6810. S2CID 236722395.
