= Arsos =

Arsos is the name of two villages in Cyprus :

- Arsos, Larnaca, in Northern Cyprus
- Arsos, Limassol, a village near Limassol
