= Hypapante Church, Dhërmi =

Church and cultural monument in Albania

Hypapante Church
- Kisha e Ipapandisë (Albanian)
- Interactive map of Hypapante Church
- Location: Dhërmi

Cultural Monument of Albania

Hypapante Church (Albanian: Kisha e Ipapandisë, Greek: Ιερός Ναός Υπαπαντής του Κυρίου) is an Albanian Orthodox church in Dhërmi, Vlorë County, Albania. It is a Cultural Monument of Albania.
