= Dhërmi =

Dhërmi Δρυμάδες
- Village
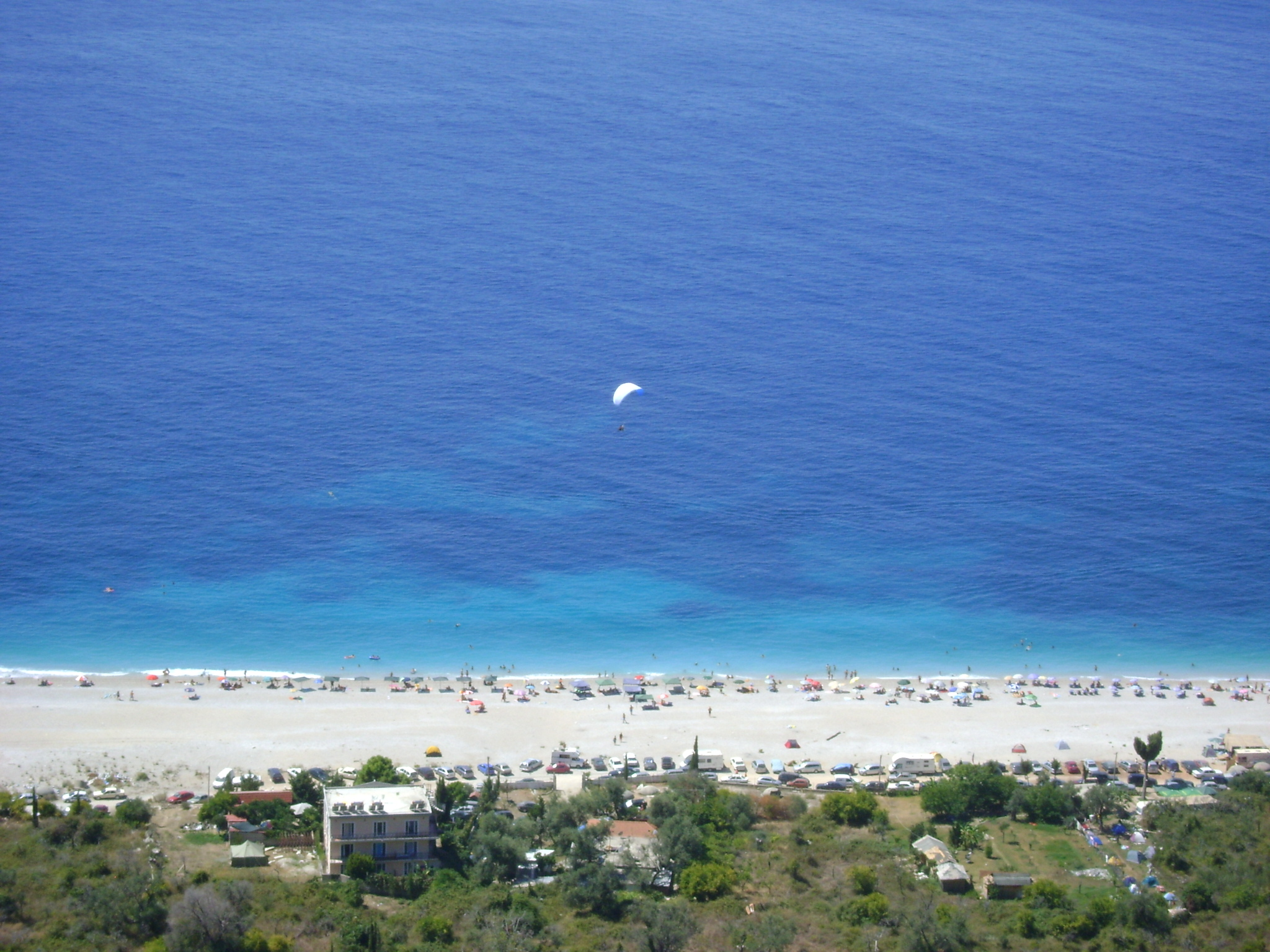
- A view of the Dhërmi coastline

- Location within Albania
- Coordinates: 40°9′0″N 19°38′20″E
- Country: Albania
- County: Vlorë
- Municipality: Himarë
- Administrative unit: Himarë
- Elevation: 200 m (660 ft)

Population
  - Total: 1,800
- Time zone: UTC+1 (CET)
  - Summer (DST): UTC+2 (CEST)
- Postal Code: 9422
- Area Code: 393

Dhërmi (Albanian definite form: Dhërmiu; Greek: Δρυμάδες, Drymádes) is a village in Vlorë County, Albania. It is part of the municipality of Himarë. The village lies 42 kilometers south of the city of Vlorë and 69 kilometers north of the southern city of Sarandë. It is built on a slope of the Ceraunian Mountains at approximately 200 meters in altitude, and comprises three neighborhoods: Gjilek, Kondraq, Kallami, and Dhërmi itself. The mountains descend to the southwest into the Ionian coast and Corfu in the distance to the south. Nearby is the village of Palasë. The local inhabitants of Dhërmi are ethnic Greeks that mainly speak a variant of the Greek Himariote dialect, and partly the Tosk Albanian dialect. During the last decade, the coastal area has seen a boom in the construction of accommodation facilities, such as wooden villa complexes.

== Name ==
The official Albanian name "Dhërmi" is mainly used by those inhabitants and seasonal workers who use either the Tosk or Gheg Albanian dialect. Many of these newcomers and seasonal workers moved to the Dhërmi from other parts of Albania during the socialist period (1945-1991) or more recently. On the other hand the Greek name of the village, "Drimades" or "Drymades", is mainly used by the inhabitants, in particular the ones who mainly use the local Greek dialect and partly the southern Albanian (Tosk) one.

== History ==
Dhërmi is recorded in the Ottoman defter of 1583 as a settlement in the Sanjak of Delvina with a total of 50 households. The anthroponymy recorded predominantly belonged to the Albanian onomastic sphere (e.g., Leka Gjini, Gjin Kondi, Gjoka Qezari), however, personal names reflecting broader Orthodox Christian anthroponymy are also recorded (e.g., Petri Dhima, Nikolla Kosta, Kristo Dhimo). Albanian historian Kristo Frashëri further writes that none of the recorded personal names can be classified as ethnic Greek onomastics.

In 1632 the first Albanian school in Dhërmi was founded by Greek Cypriot missionary Neophytos Rodinos. A Greek-language school was also founded in 1633 in Dhërmi by the same missionary.

Additional Greek schools operated by 1682 with the support of the local bishopric of Himara. During the 17th century (precise year is unknown) another Greek school (the Vizilios School) opened under the sponsorship of a local benefactor. In the 1898–1899 school season three Greek schools were operating: elementary, secondary and a girls' school.

On the request of Himariots to the Pope of Rome, a new Basilian mission to Albania was launched in 1693. Among the missionaries were Nico Catalano, who in Albania had already been titled Archbishop of Durrës, and Basilian monk Filoteo Zassi, from the Arbëreshë town of Mezzojuso. They departed by the end of January 1693, and firstly stopped in Dhërmi, where they found a deteriorated spiritual state of the people, with pressures firstly from the Ottomans, and secondly from the Greek bishops who, as reported by Catalano, "were making of God's house a house of traffic, of affairs and of sacrilegious trade". Catalano opened a school in the Himarë region, raised in the village of Dhërmi, where more than eighty students, both Christian and Muslim, were registered from the adjacent villages. Catalano taught Christian spirit and morals, as well as farming techniques and other professions. Catalano was particularly careful in teaching and preaching in the Albanian language, since he considered it to be the most effective method to counter the diffusion of Islam. The Archbishop stayed in the Himarë region visiting the peoples of local villages, until in Vuno he fell ill, and he died on June 3, 1694. He was buried at the Church of St. Athanasius in Dhërmi. The initiative by the Catholic missionaries finally failed since the locals didn't show any interest and the recruitment of student was unsuccessful. The Italian missionary Giuseppe Schirò wrote in 1722 that Dhërmi was inhabited by Greeks.

On November 5, 1912, when the nearby town of Himara was controlled by the Greek forces of the local major Spyros Spyromilios, armed groups from Dhermi declared that they were prepared to assist his movement for the incorporation of the rest of the region into Greece.

In 2015 the demolition of the local church of St. Athanasius by the state authorities caused a storm of reactions between the Albanian Orthodox Church and the Albanian Government as well as sparked tensions between the municipality of Himarë and both the local Albanian and ethnic Greek orthodox communities. Three years later the church was being reconstructed. It was second demolition of the specific religious monument by the state authorities, the first having taken place during the era of the People's Republic of Albania, but at the time the church was rebuilt by the local Orthodox Church after the restoration of Democracy in the country (1991).

As of 2018, Dhërmi has been hosting many music festivals, making it a popular tourist destination.

== Demographics ==
The village is inhabited by an ethnic Greek community. The inhabitants of Dhërmi are primarily Greek-speaking and partly Tosk Albanian-speaking, calling themselves horiani or Drimadiotes, a term used to denote that they are locals who originate from the village. They speak a variety of the Greek Himariote dialect, which is characterized by archaic features not retained in Standard Modern Greek. There are also some Tosk-speaking and Gheg-speaking newcomers and seasonal workers, who moved to Dhërmi from other parts of Albania during the communist era (1945-1990).

== Tourism ==
Dhërmi is considered to be a popular tourist destination, especially due to its well-known beaches and at times riotous nightclub-based nightlife centred on the modern resorts of Dhërmi's coastline. In 2018 Dhërmi was considered a center in the Albanian Riviera area by the Ministry of Tourism and Environment. The beach is 5km long and it ends into a hill where the monastery of Saint Theodore is located. The former minister Blendi Klosi created a touristic campaign named "Smile Albania" on promoting the local Albanian cuisine, part of the "Local products, an added offer in our touristic package". Dhërmi and the rest of Himarë region is famous for the Beekeeping and the production of Honey, where a three-days fair "Mjalt Fest" takes place every year. The government also promotes the "Kala Fest" festival to boost the tourism of Dhërmi.

== Landmarks ==
- Dhërmi Beach
- Alevra
- Bay of Grama
- The Pirates' cave
- The harbor of Gjipe
- Hypapante Church, Dhërmi
- Panagia Monastery Church, Dhërmi
- St. Stephen's Church, Dhërmi

== Notable people ==
- Petro Marko, Albanian writer and founding father of modern Albanian prose.
- Pano Bixhili, diplomat
- Kiço Fotiadhi, the first Albanian TV speaker

== Gallery ==
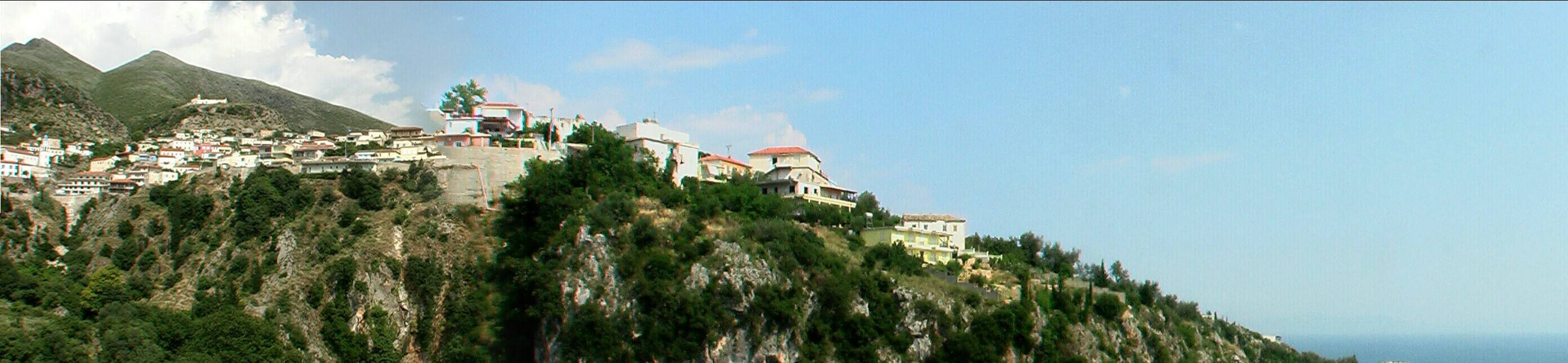
View of part of the village.
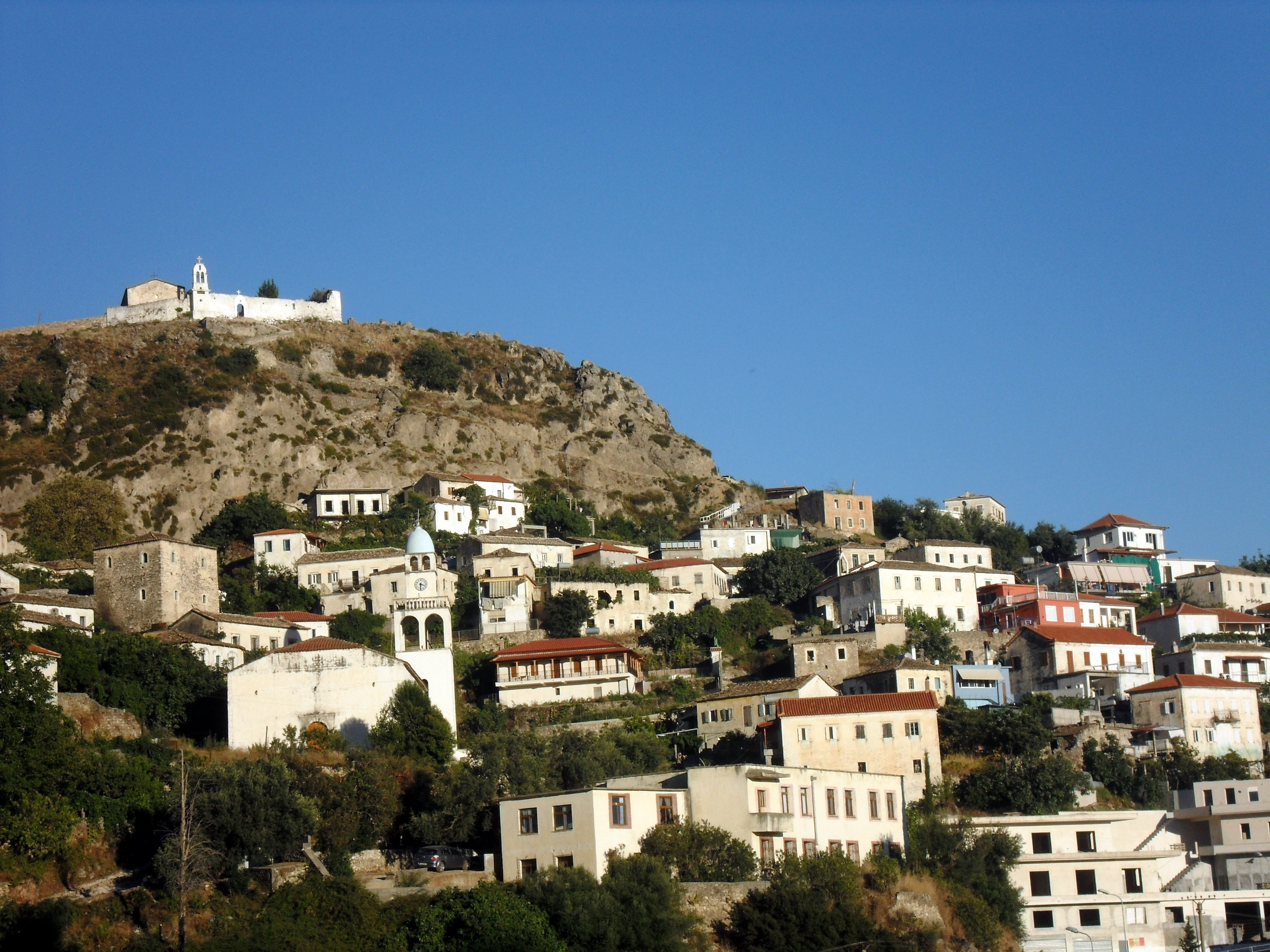
Dhërmi

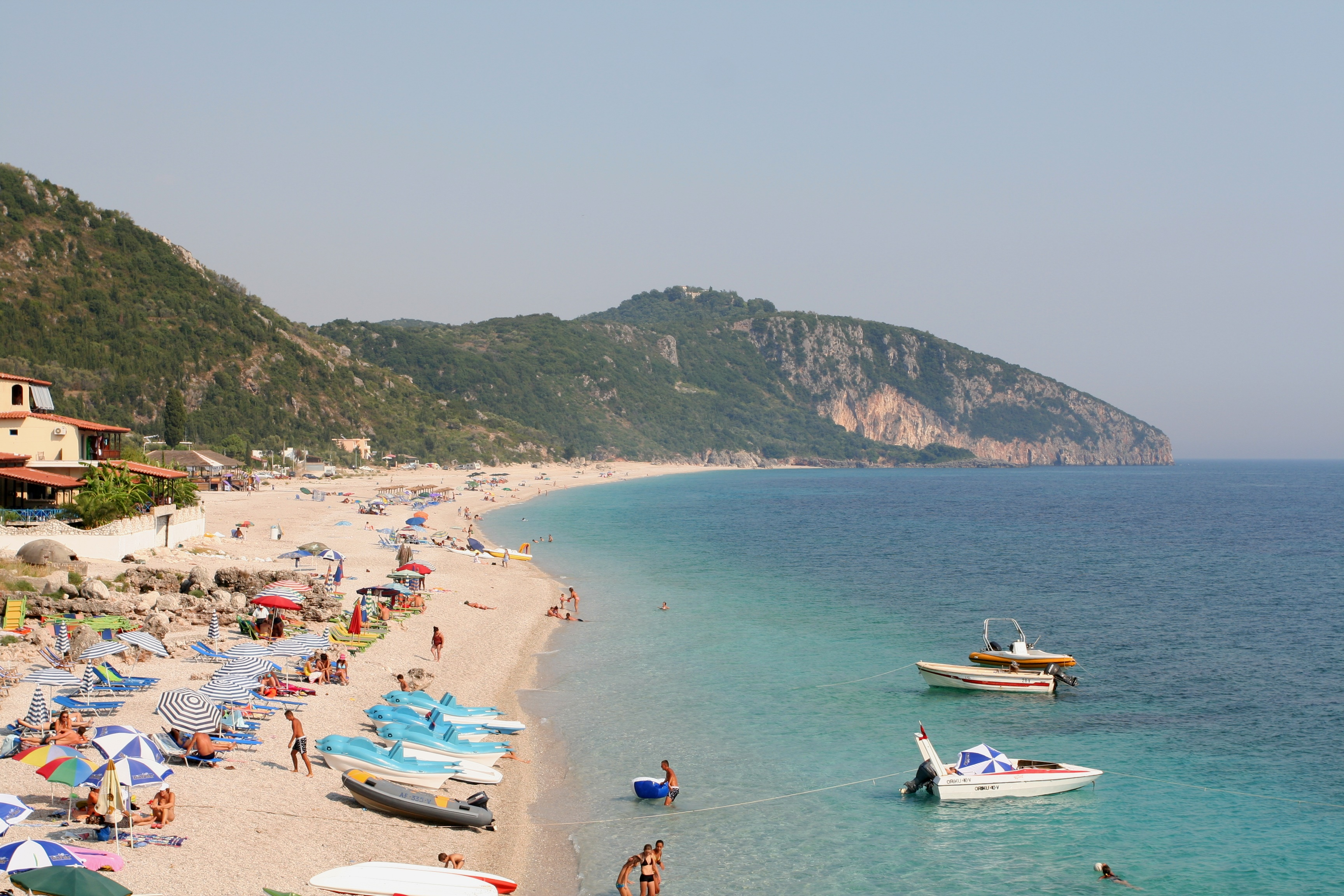
A local beach

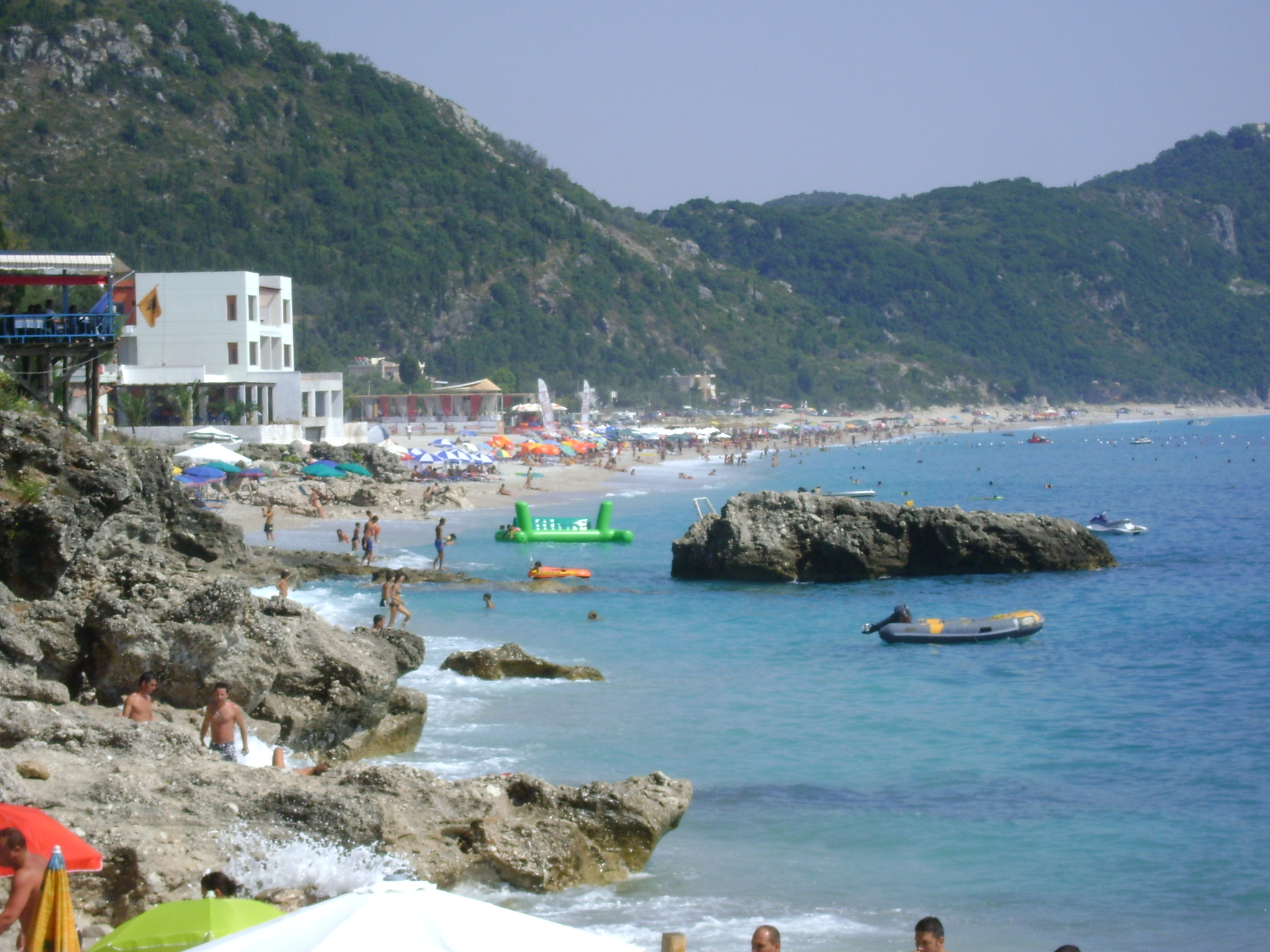
Dhërmi beach

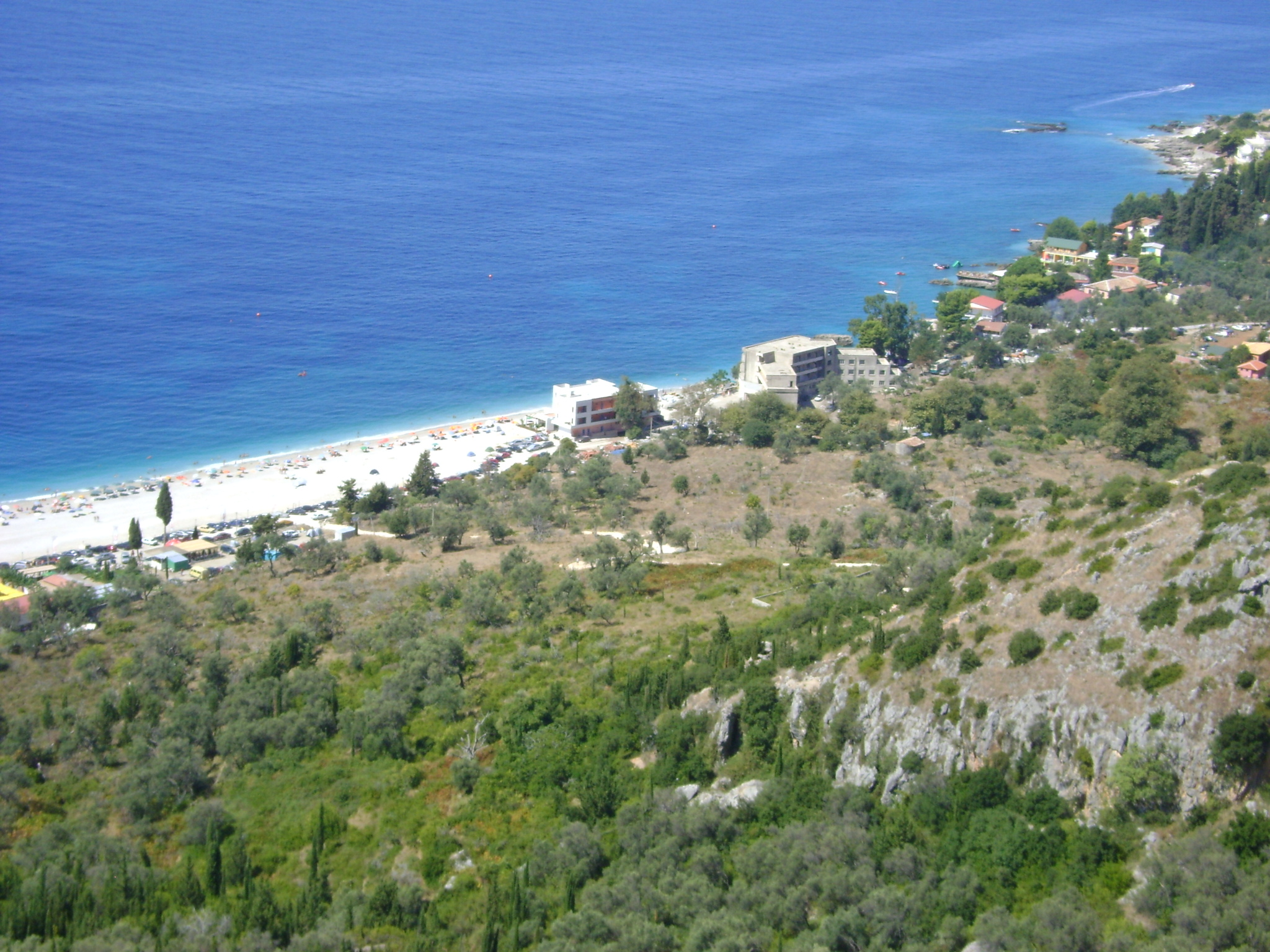
Camp of Workers

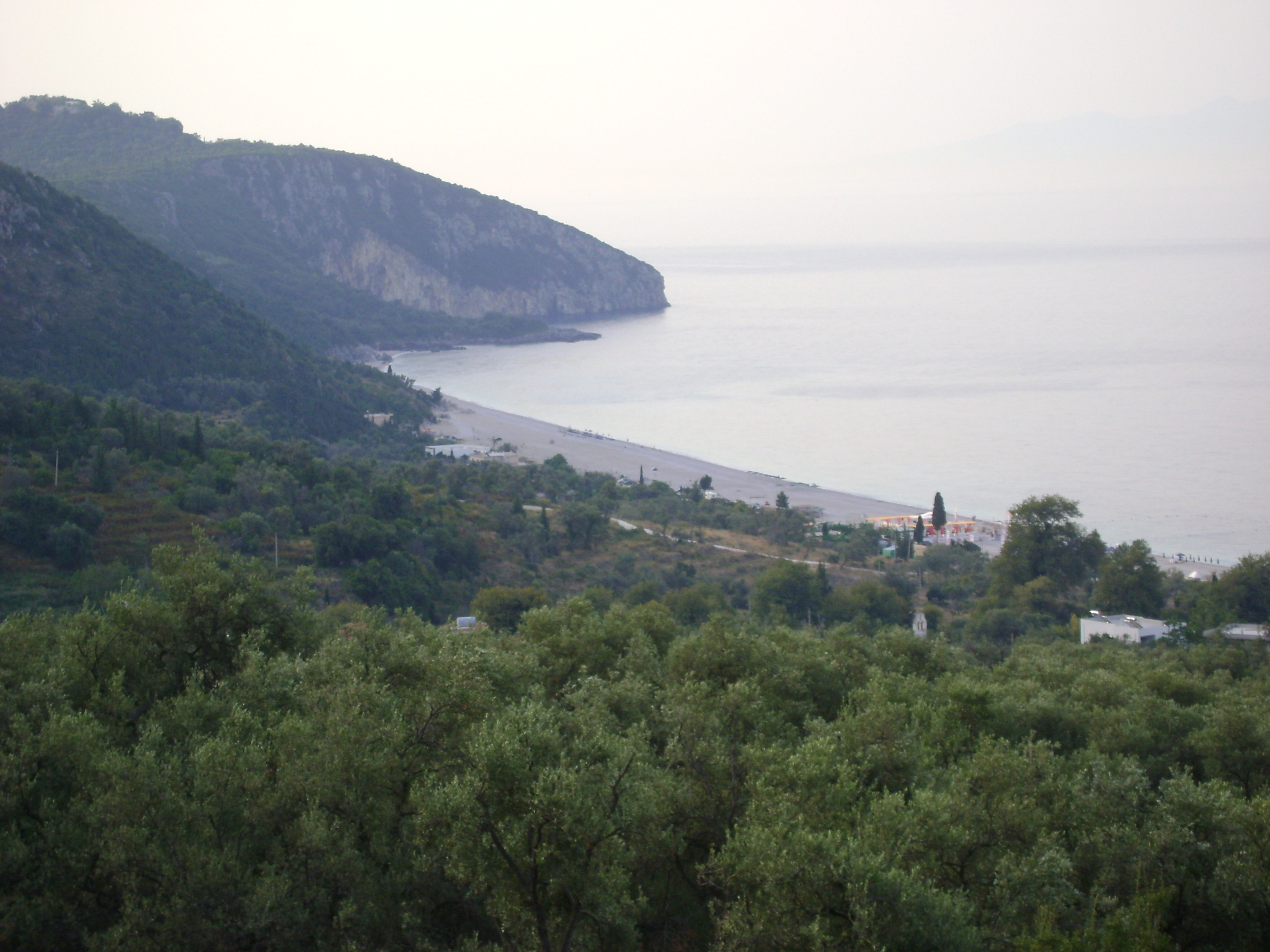
Dhërmi long beach

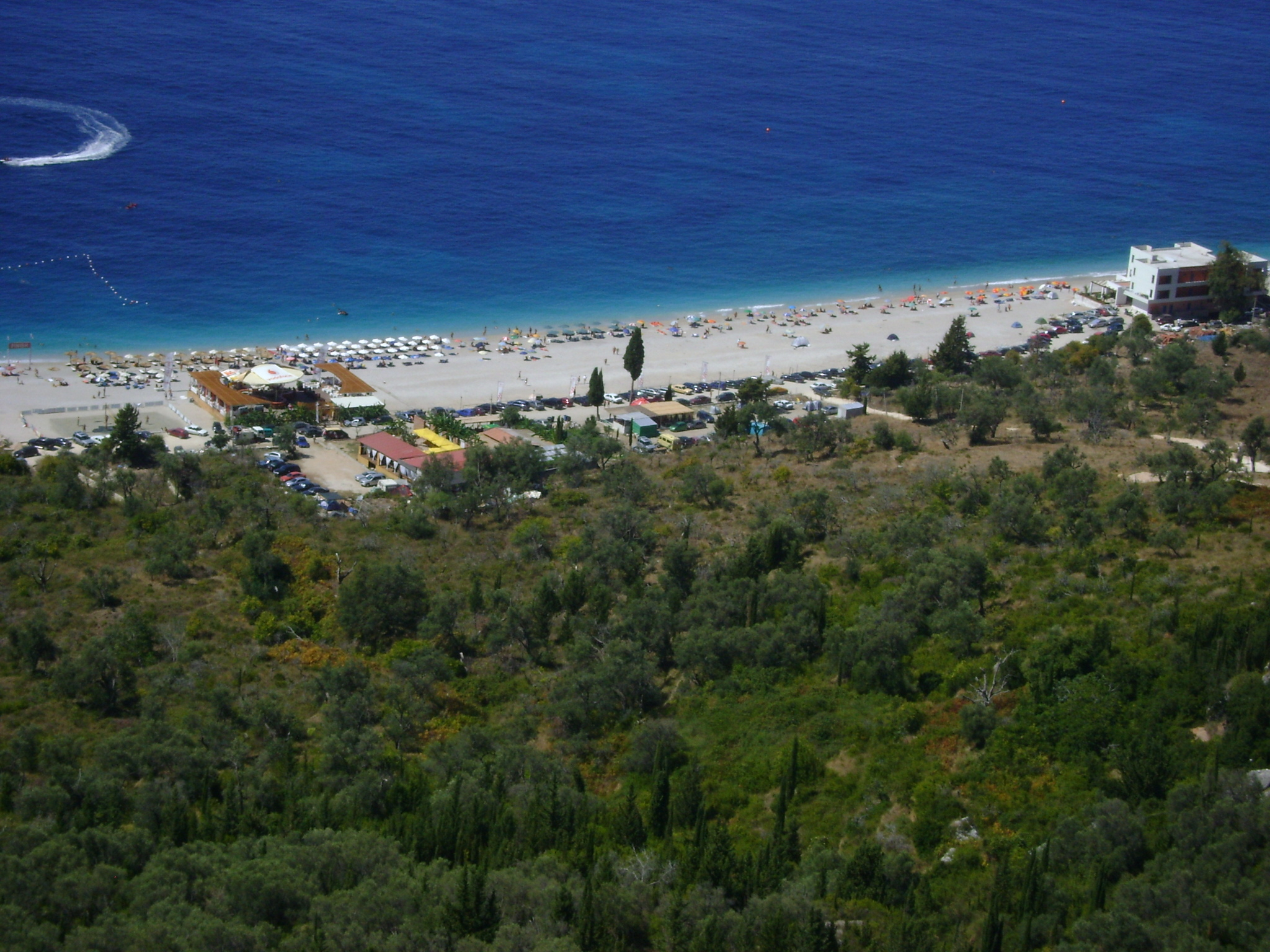
A local beach bar

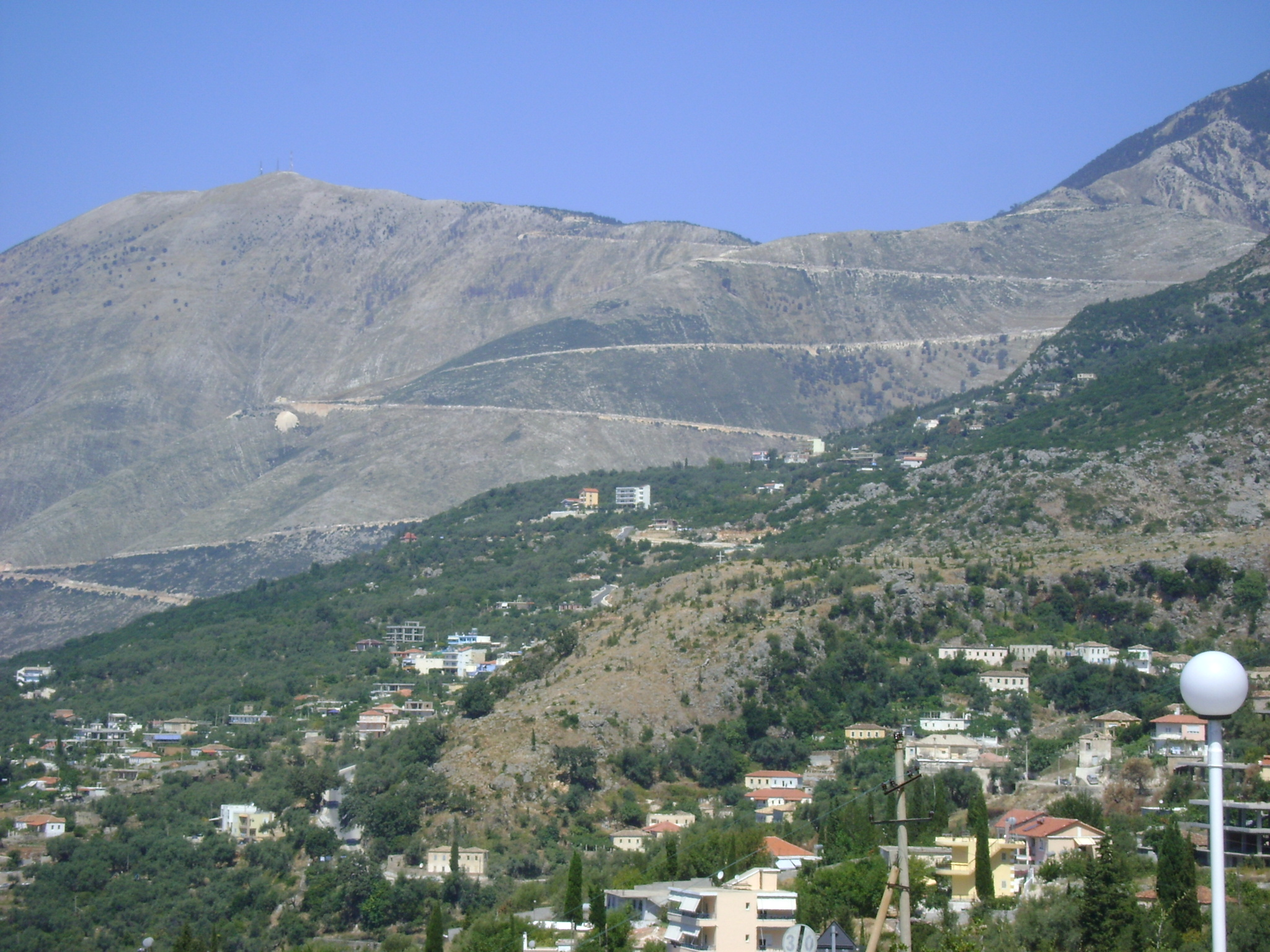
The Ceraunian mountains (Llogara)

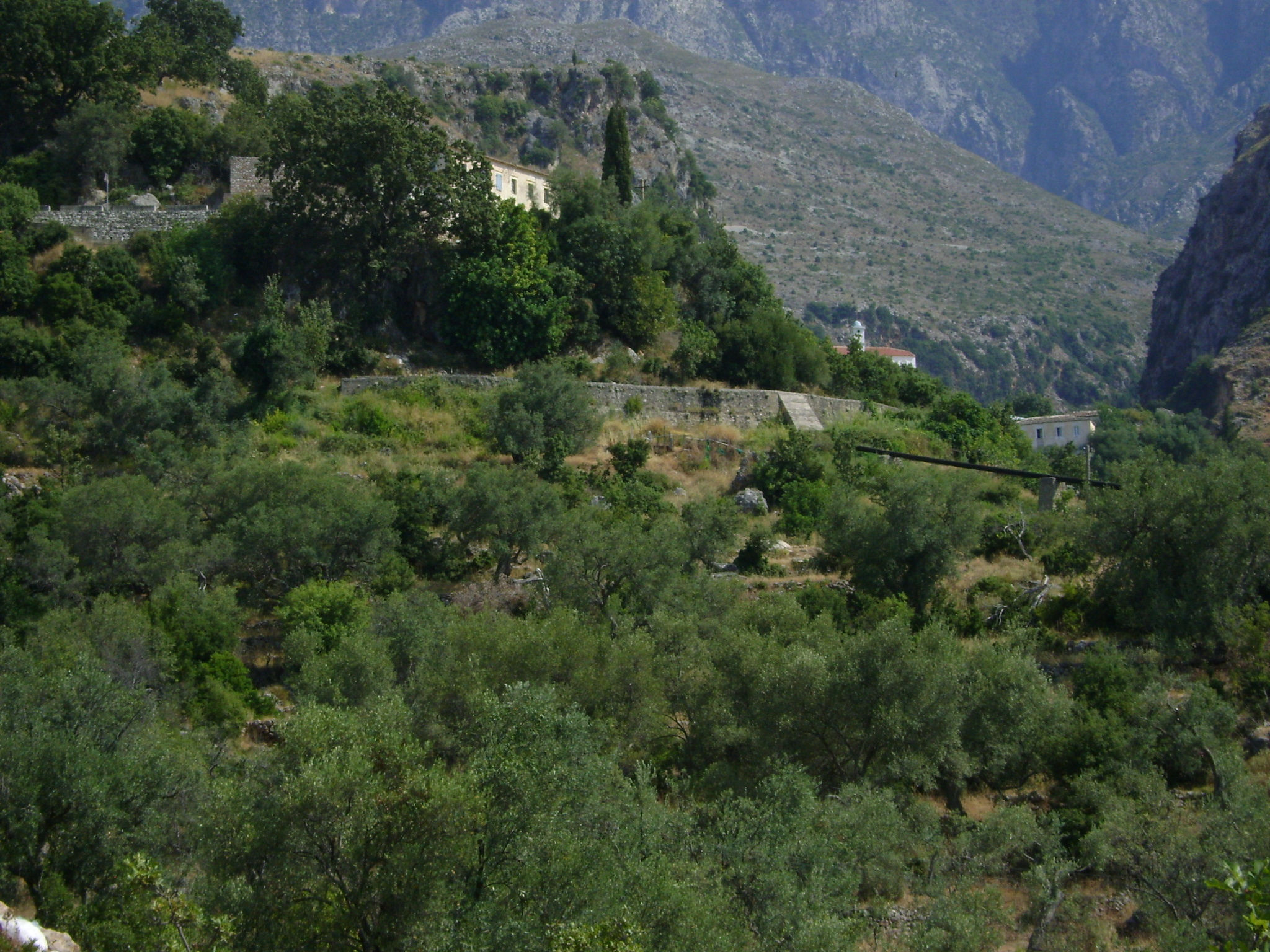
Gogo Leka

== See also ==
- Albanian Ionian Sea Coast
- Tourism in Albania
