= St. Stephen's Church, Dhërmi =

Cultural Monument in Albania

St. Stephen's Church
- Mbeturinat e Kishës së Shën Stefanit (Albanian)
- Interactive map of St. Stephen's Church
- Location: Dhërmi

Cultural Monument of Albania

St. Stephen's Church (Albanian: Mbeturinat e Kishës së Shën Stefanit, Greek: Ιερός Ναός Αγίου Στεφάνου) is a ruined church in Dhërmi, Vlorë County, Albania. It is a Cultural Monument of Albania.
