= Panagia Monastery Church, Dhërmi =

Church and cultural monument in Albania

Panagia Monastery Church
- Kisha e Manastirit të Panaiasë (Albanian)
- Location: Dhërmi

Cultural Monument of Albania

Panagia Monastery Church (Albanian: Kisha e Manastirit të Panaiasë, Greek: Ιερά Μονή Κοιμήσεως της Θεοτόκου) is an Albanian Orthodox monastery church in Dhërmi, Vlorë County, Albania. It is a Cultural Monument of Albania.
