= Pano Bixhili =

Albanian diplomat

Pano Bixhili (Russian: Пано Бицили Greek: Πάνος Μπιτζίλης) was an 18th-century General Consul of Russia in Albania and Himara.

== Life ==
Pano Bixhili came from the village Dhërmi, modern Albania, then Ottoman Empire, from an Albanian family background, whom spoke Albanian in the Tosk dialect and more specifically in the Lab sub dialect. In 18th century documents from the Russian Imperial Archive of External Affairs, he and his brother Gjika are described as "noble Albanians from Epirus". One of the most notable Albanian families of the Venetian and Ottoman period the Bixhili provided diplomats to the Russian Empire in the 18th century. Moreover, they also provided several officers to the Regimento Cimarioto (Himariote regiment) of the Venetian army as well as for the Albanskoe Volsko and the Odesskii Grecheskii Divizion Russian army.

Being an influential personality, he became the Russian consul in Albania and Himara, in the 1780s. During the Russo-Turkish War (1768-1774) together with Loudovikos Sotiris from Lefkada, became the revolutionary leaders of an uprising in Epirus against the Ottomans. He was probably also a member of the Greek patriotic organization Filiki Eteria.

The Bixhili family are mentioned from the 16th century to the 19th century in historical sources. According to an official Albanian DNA project known as rrenjet the Bixhili family DNA was uploaded and analysed. The results show that the haplogroup of the Bixhili family are J2a-M410>L25>Y197827, Haplogroup J-M172.
