= Potamiou =

Potamiou Ποταμιού
- Village
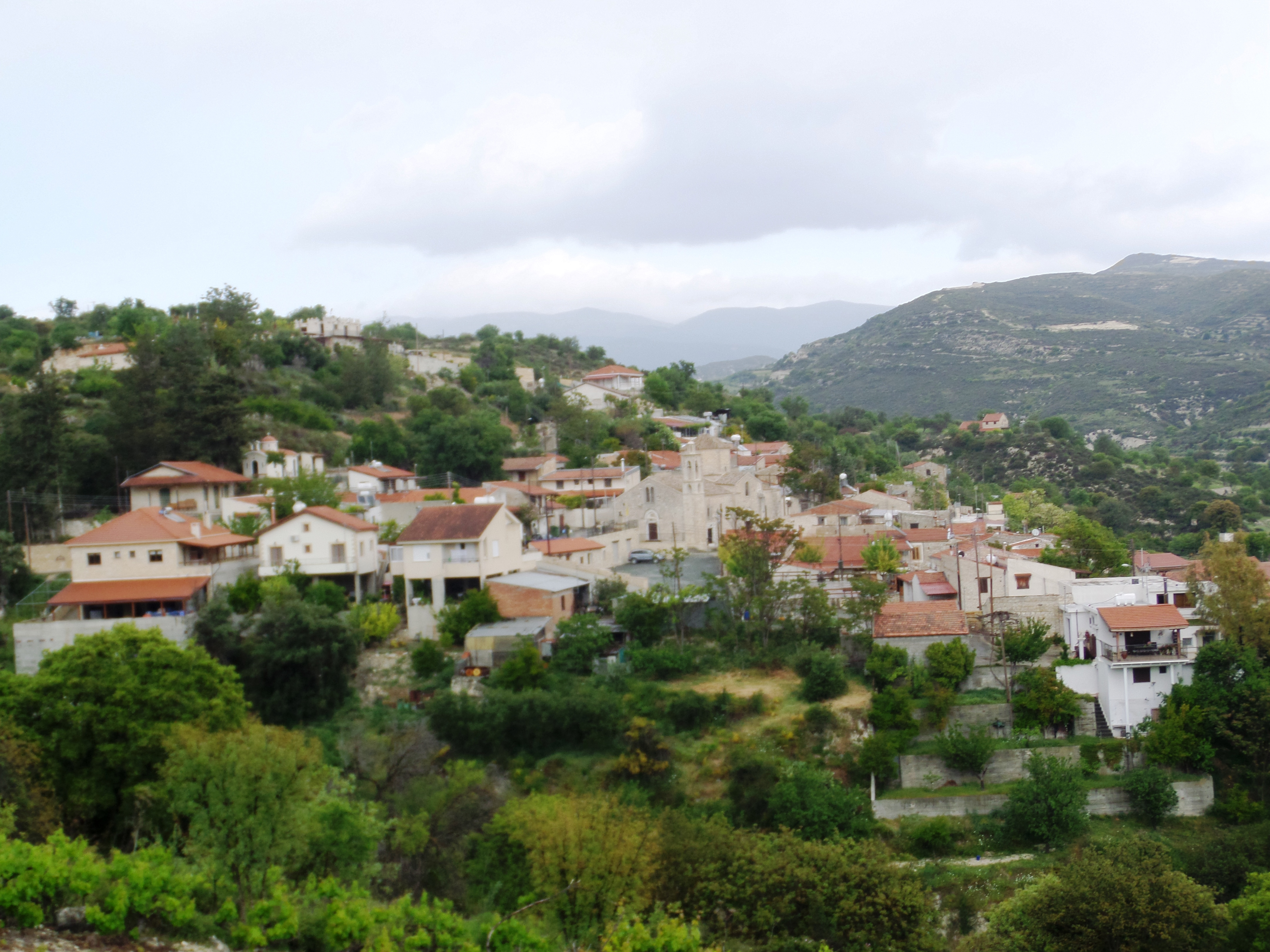

- Location in Cyprus
- Coordinates: 34°49′26″N 32°48′24″E
- Country: Cyprus
- District: Limassol District

Government
  - President of the Community Council: Simos Constantinou (since 2021)

Population (2001)
  - Total: 33
- Time zone: UTC+2 (EET)
  - Summer (DST): UTC+3 (EEST)
- Postal code: 4780

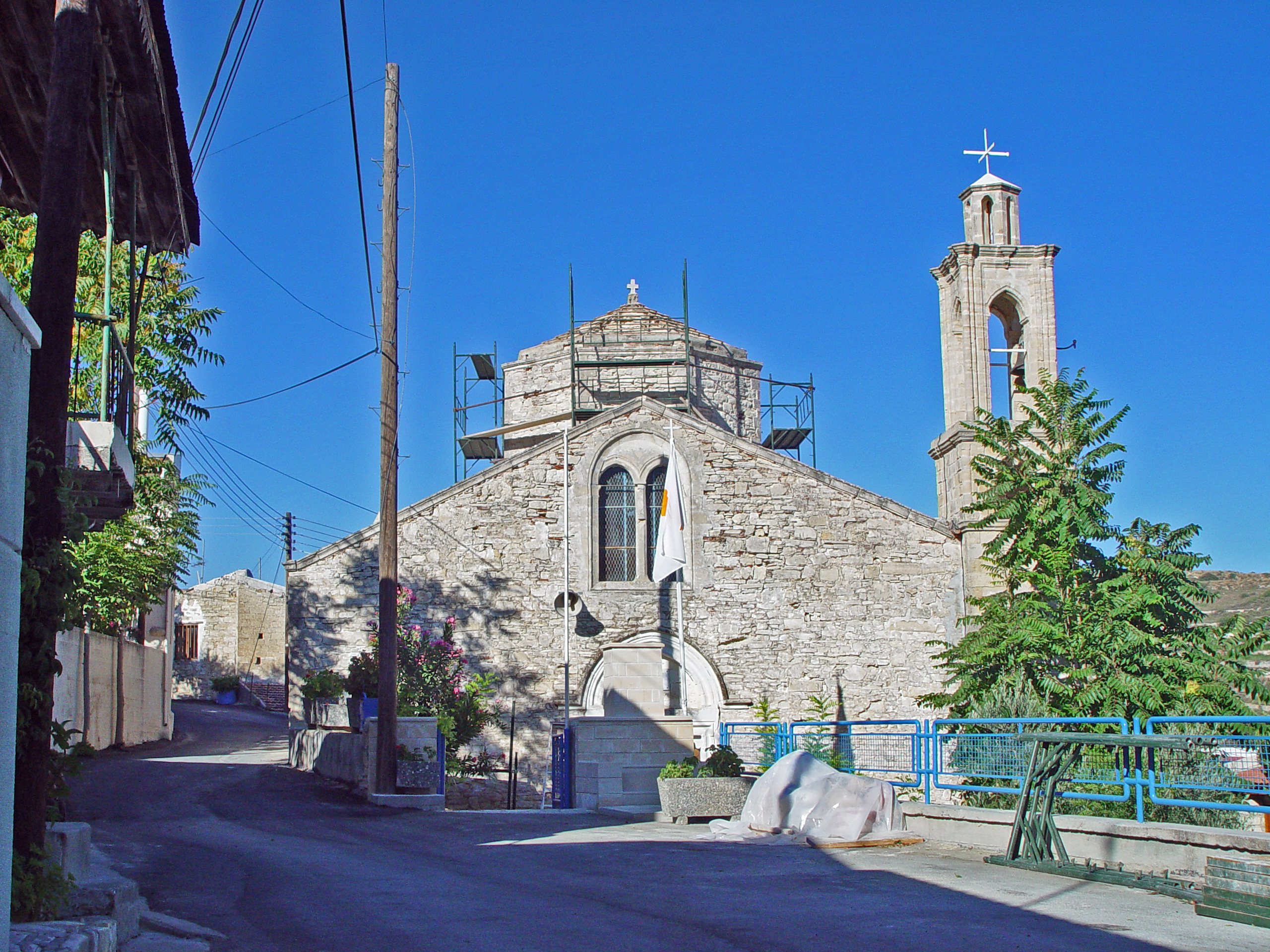
A church in Potamiou village

Potamiou (Greek: Ποταμιού) is a village in the Limassol District of Cyprus, located 4 km south of Omodos. At Potamiou you may visit the ruins of the ancient church of Agios Mnasonas.

The current president of the community council is Simos Constantinou.
