= Arsos, Limassol =

Arsos Άρσος
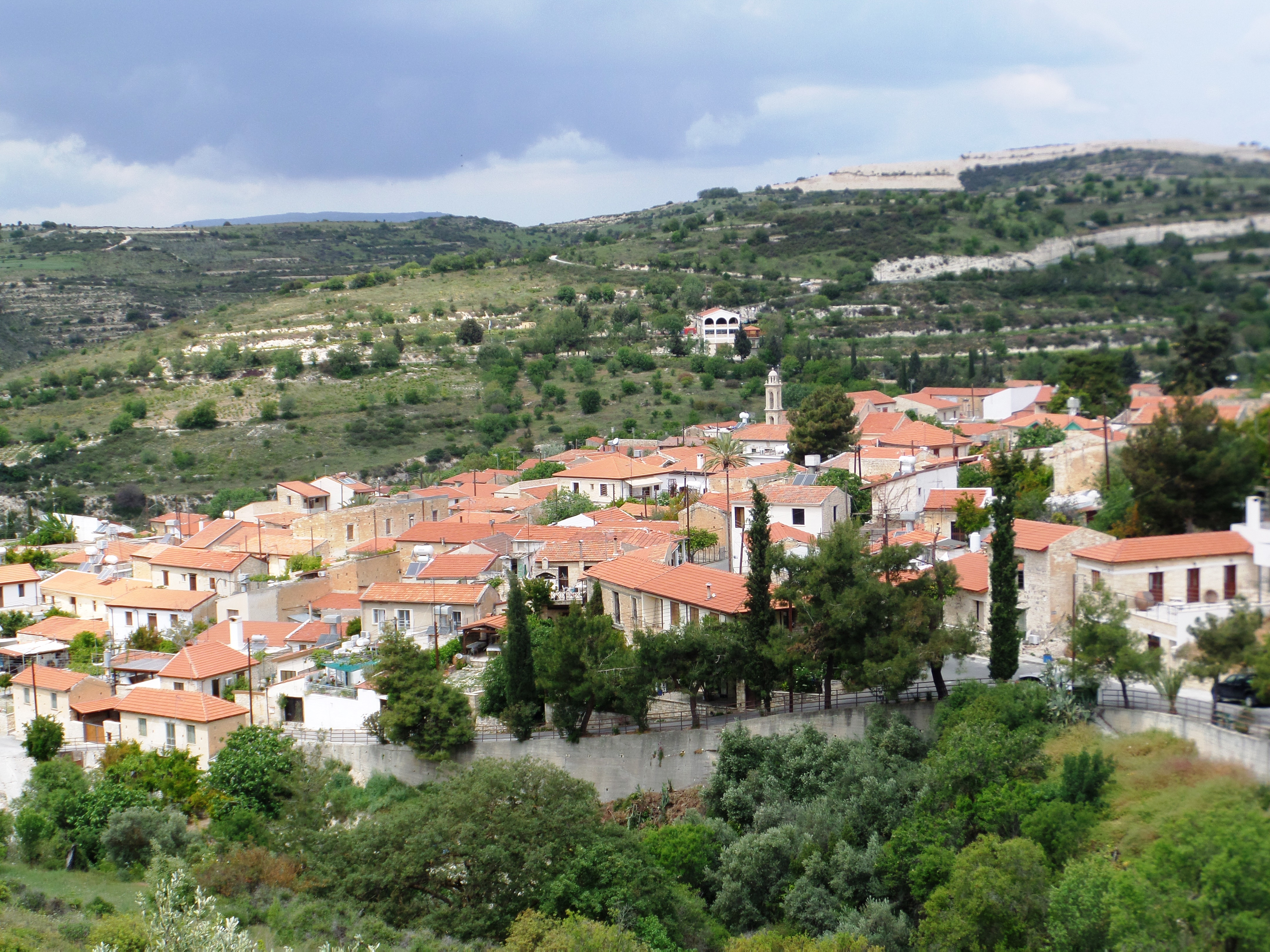

- Location in Cyprus
- Coordinates: 34°50′26″N 32°46′9″E
- Country: Cyprus
- District: Limassol District

Population (2001)
  - Total: 233
- Time zone: UTC+2 (EET)
  - Summer (DST): UTC+3 (EEST)
- Website: http://www.arsos.org/

Arsos (Greek: Άρσος) is a village located in the Limassol District of Cyprus.

== History ==
Arsos has been a winemaking village for centuries. It was already renowned for its vineyards in the 16th century, with the 1572 Ottoman census records suggesting that the village already had a long winemaking tradition in the Venetian period. In the late 16th century, it was also the only centre of trade in the nahiye of Evdhimou, in which it was administratively placed during the Ottoman rule; the village held a once-weekly market. It was recorded as having an entirely Christian population of 250 households and 26 bachelors in the 1572 census. It was thus the largest village in the region, and the second richest (paying 22,394 akçe every year), as it paid less tax then Pano Evdhimou. With its relatively large size, Arsos was subdivided into four quarters: Agios Apostol, Agios Androniko, Agios Pereshkoga and Agios Philippos, as transcribed from the Ottoman records. Arsos' name itself was recorded as Archu. Under the Ottoman administration, the village derived its income from grain cultivation, and with winemaking banned, the vineyards produced and sold grape juice; indeed, Arsos was the largest producer of grape juice in the region.
