= Omodos =

Coordinates: 34°50′53″N 32°48′30″E

Omodos 'Ομοδος
- Village
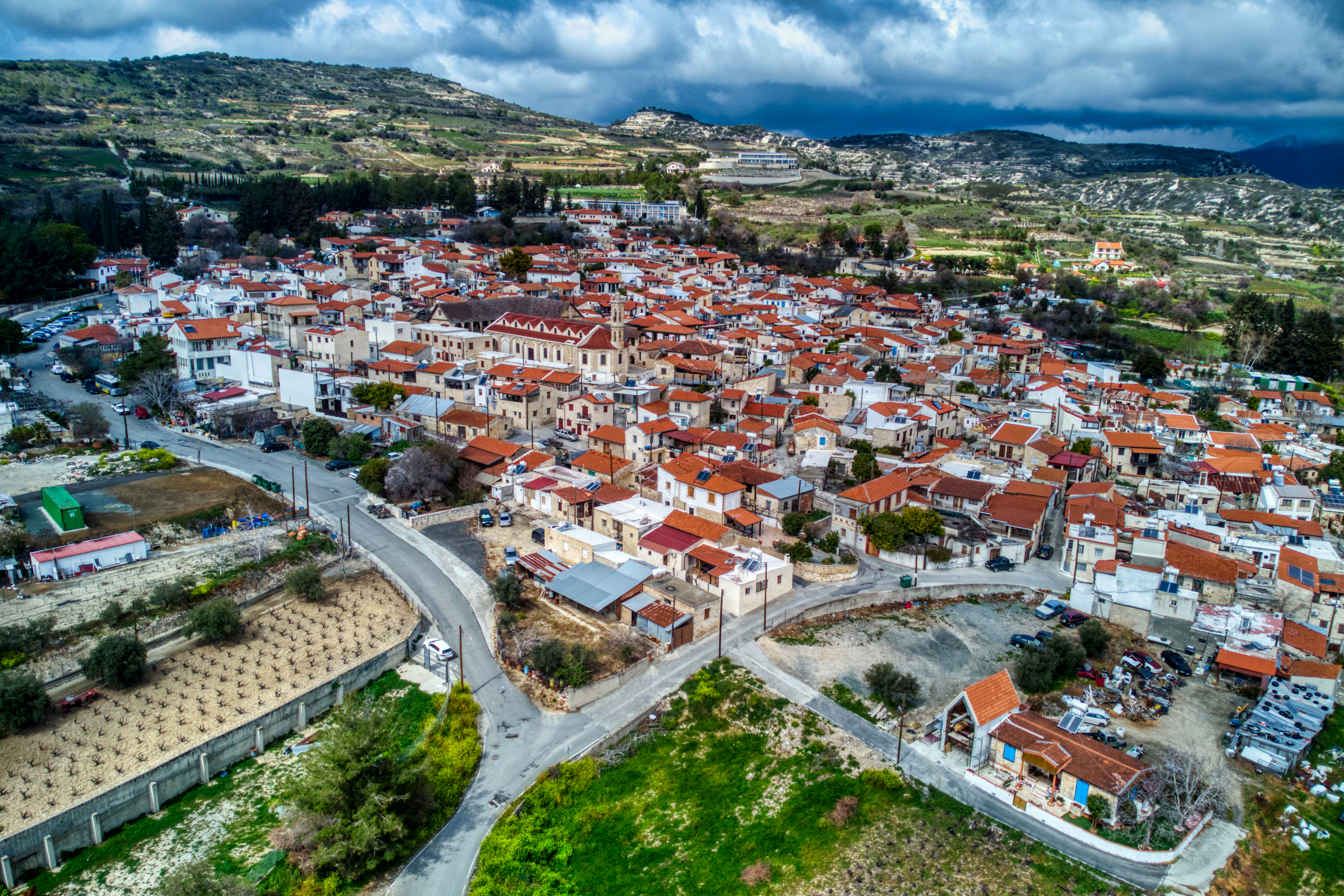
- Country: Cyprus
- District: Limassol District

Government
  - Body: Community Council of Omodos
  - President: Evgenios Michael
  - Vice President: Christofakis Georgiou

Population (2021)
  - Total: 339
- Time zone: UTC+2 (EET)
  - Summer (DST): UTC+3 (EEST)
- Website: omodos.org

Omodos (Greek: 'Ομοδος) is a village in the Troödos Mountains of the Limassol District of Cyprus. It is located 80 kilometers from the city of Nicosia.

== Gallery ==
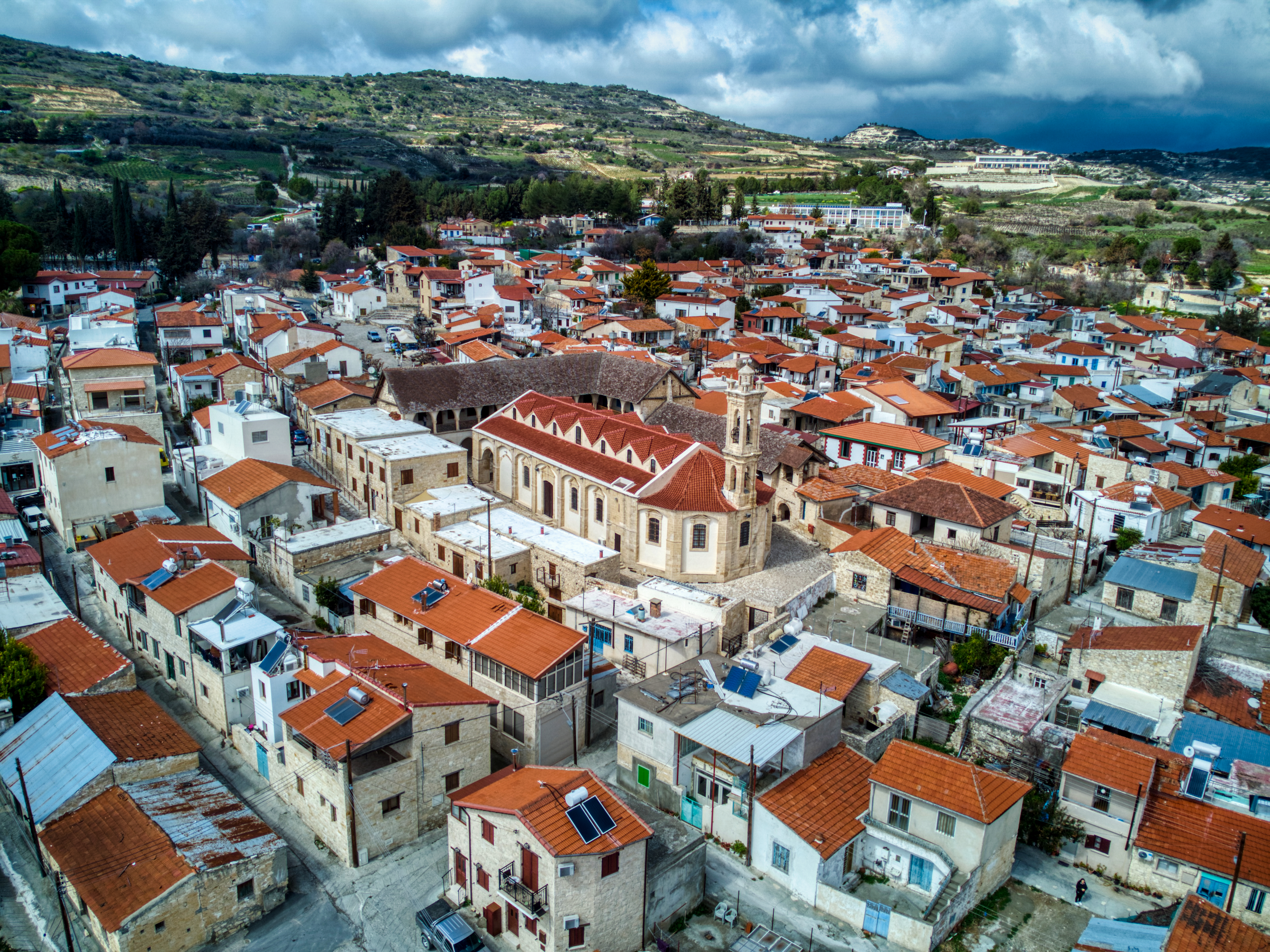
The monastery and the surrounding streets

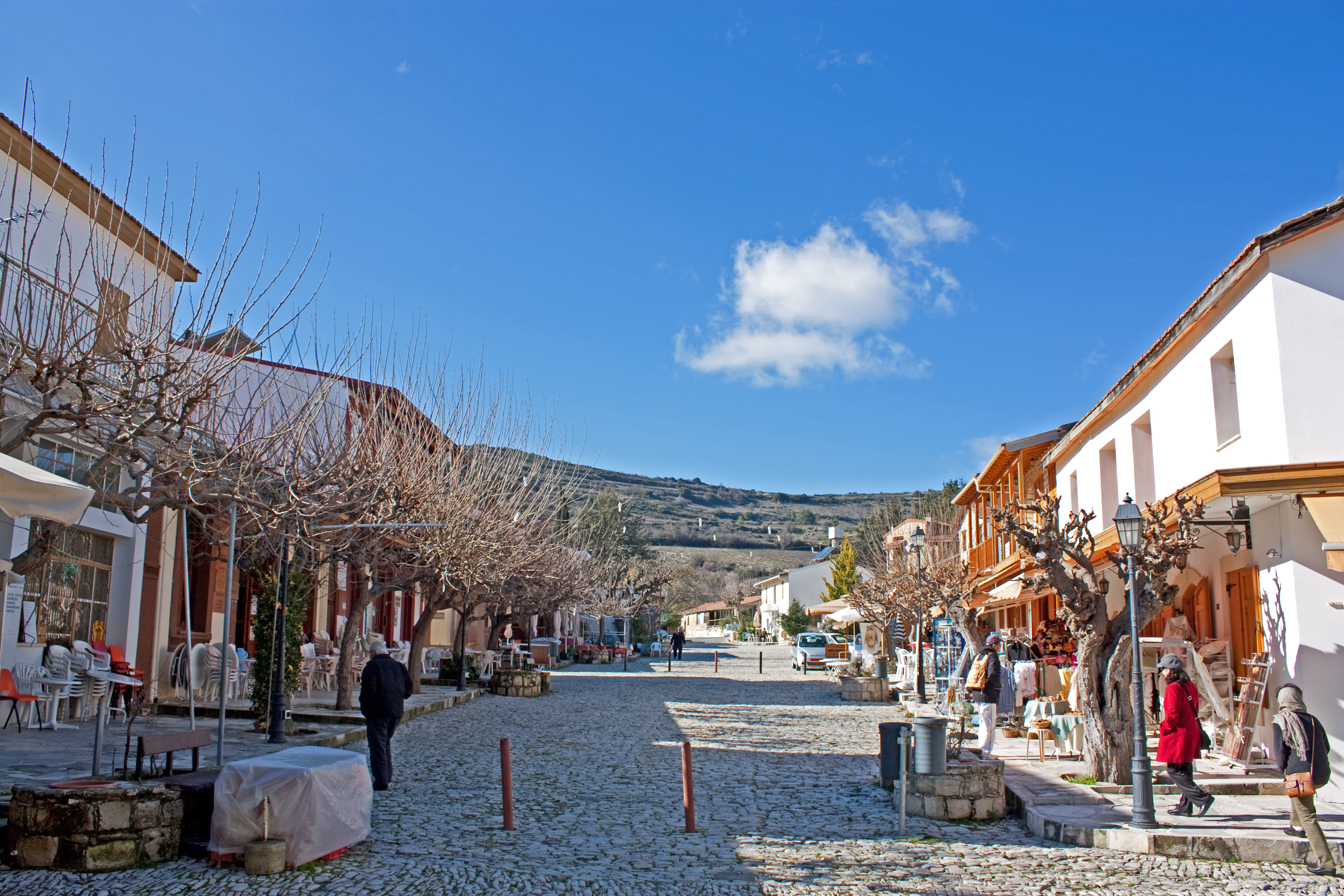
Omodos square

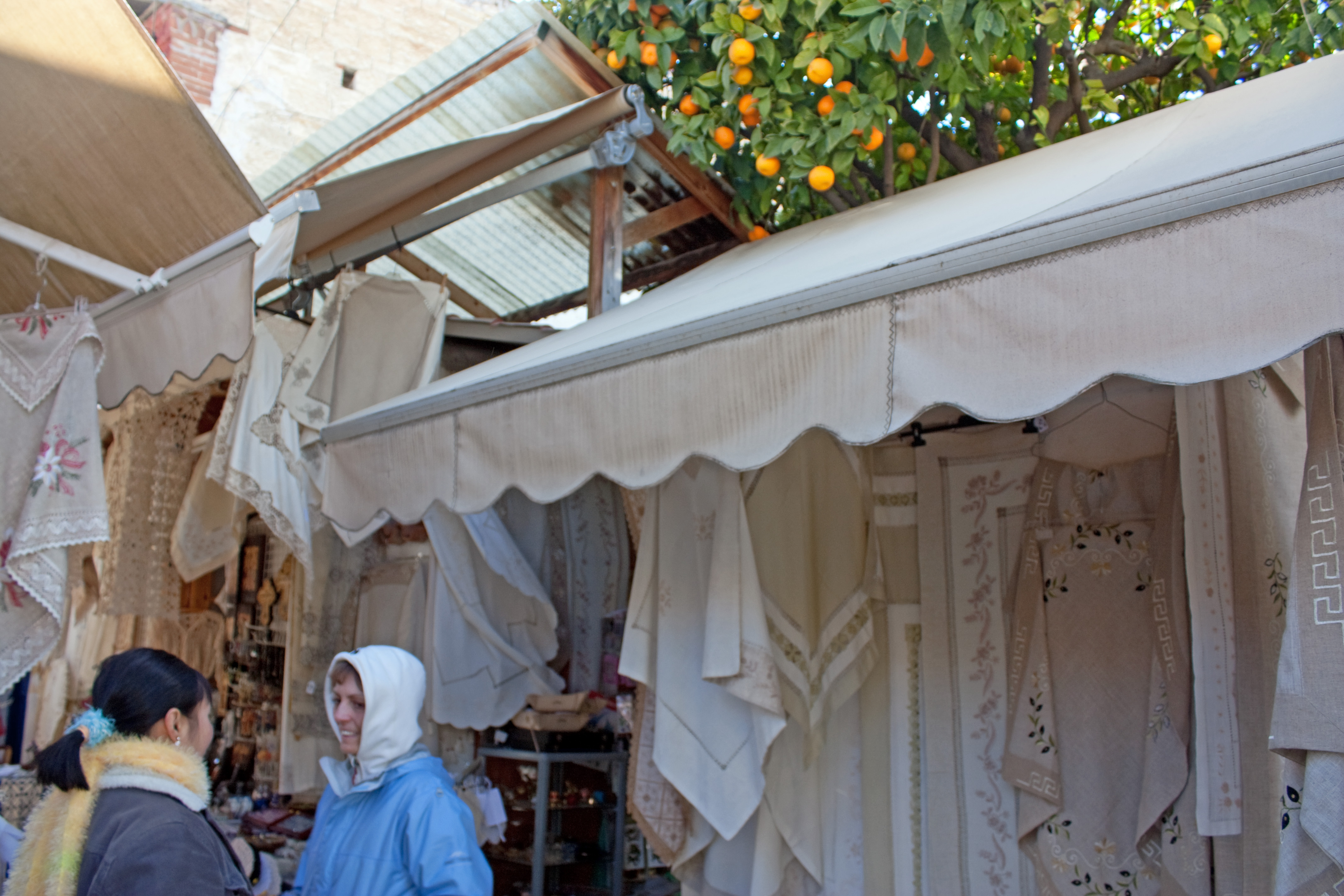
Street vendor in Omodos streets

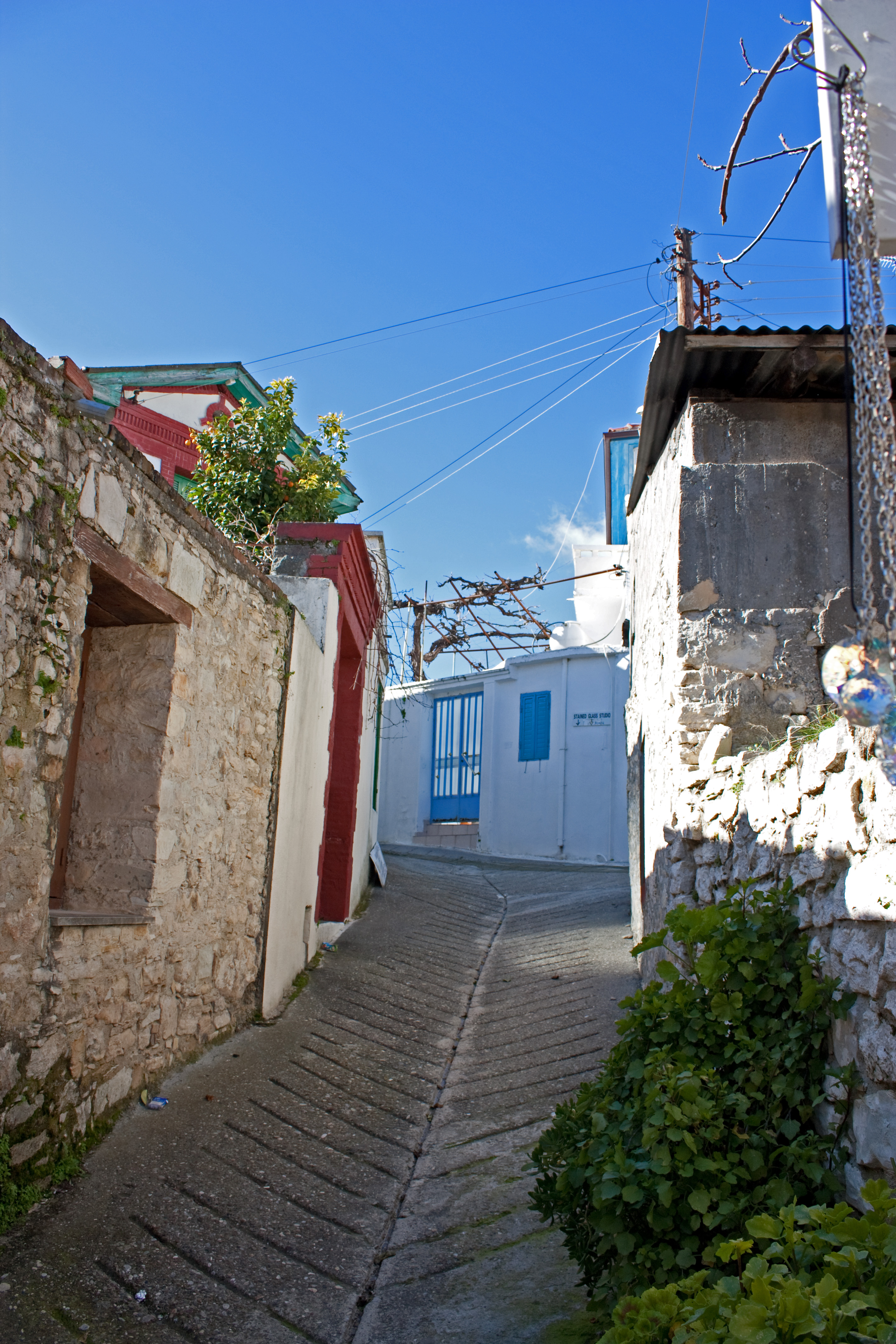
Typical streets of Omodos

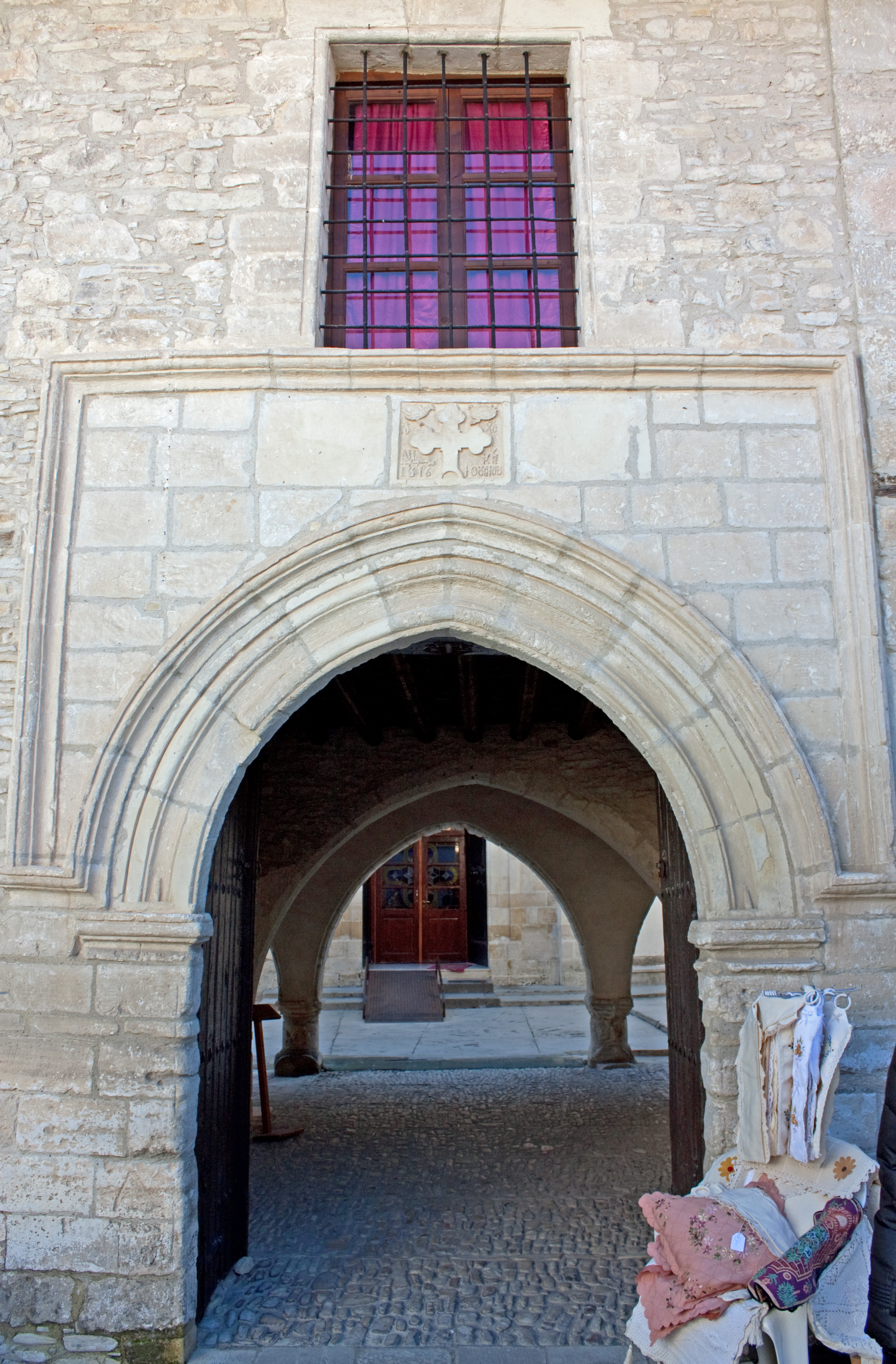
Omodos archway

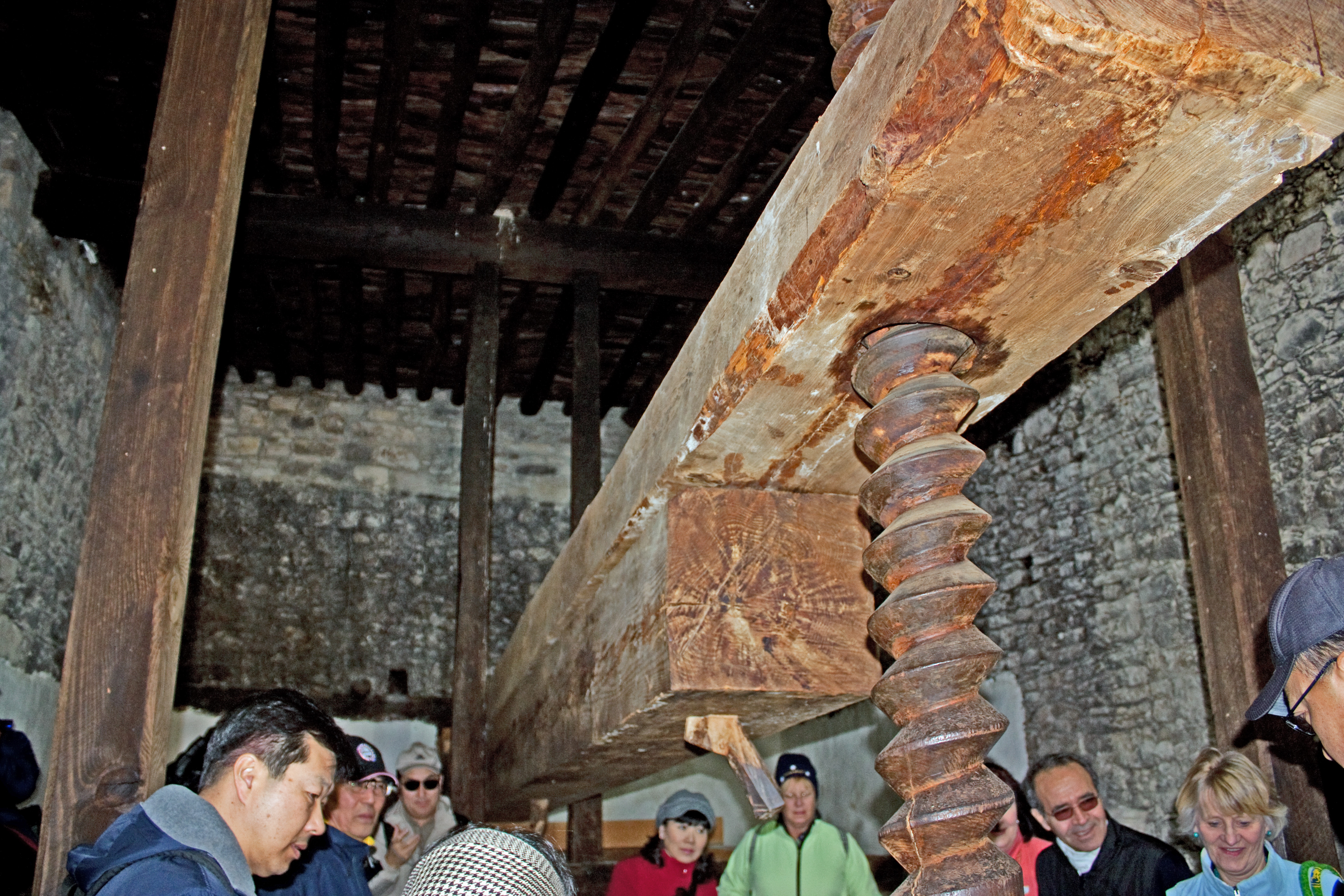
Omodos old traditional wine press workplace

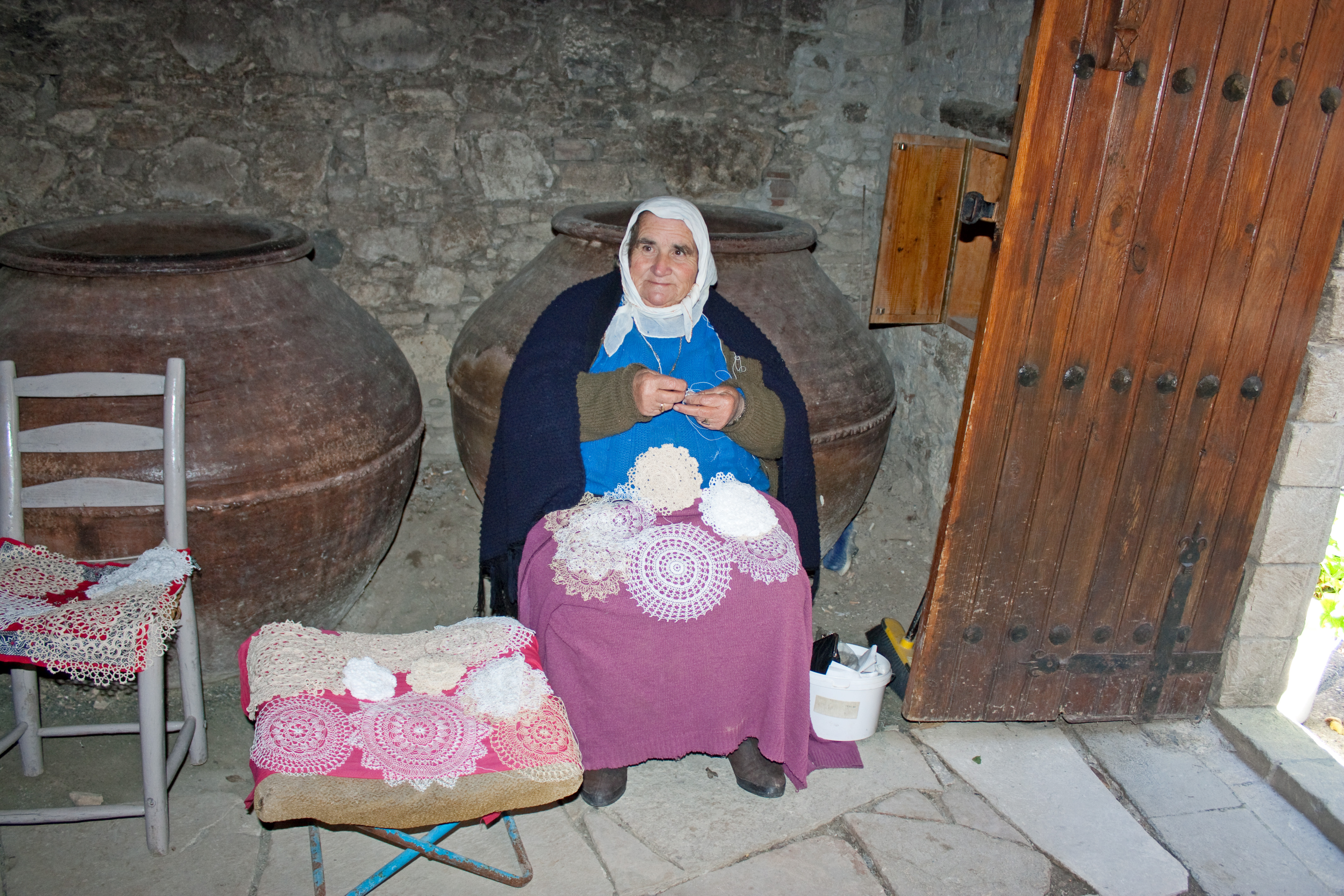
Old woman in Omodos crocheting

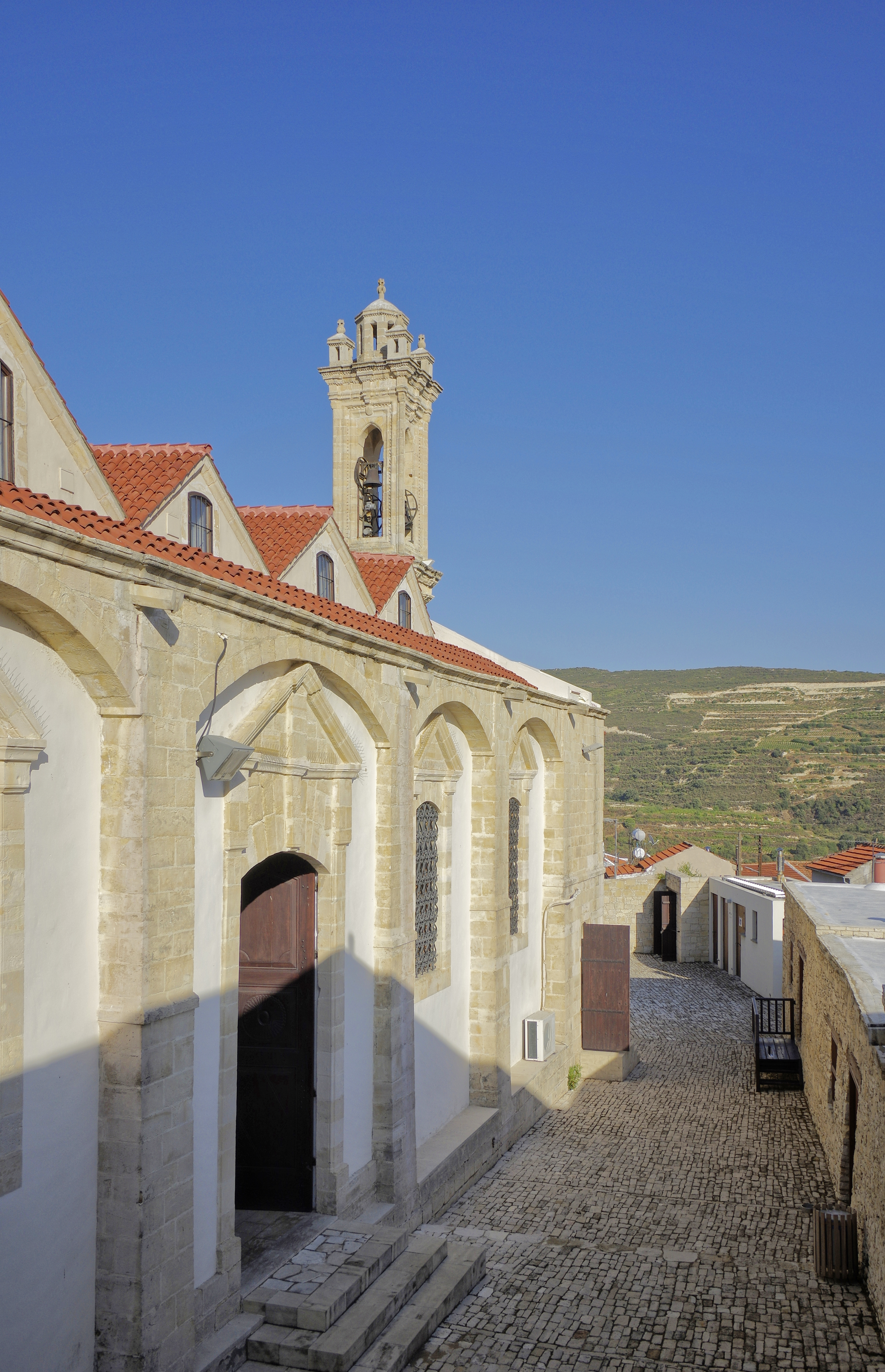
Monastery of Stavros exterior

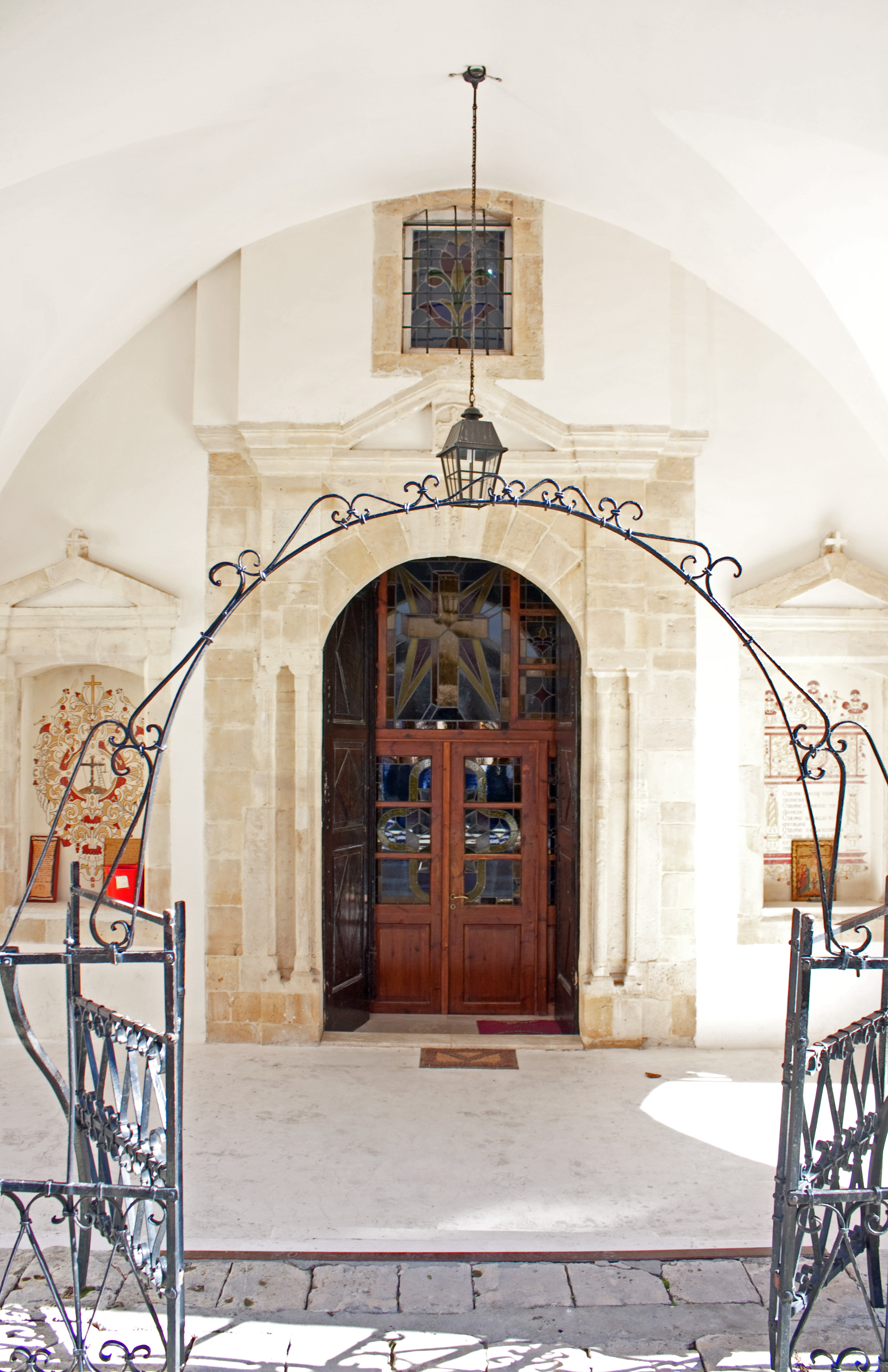

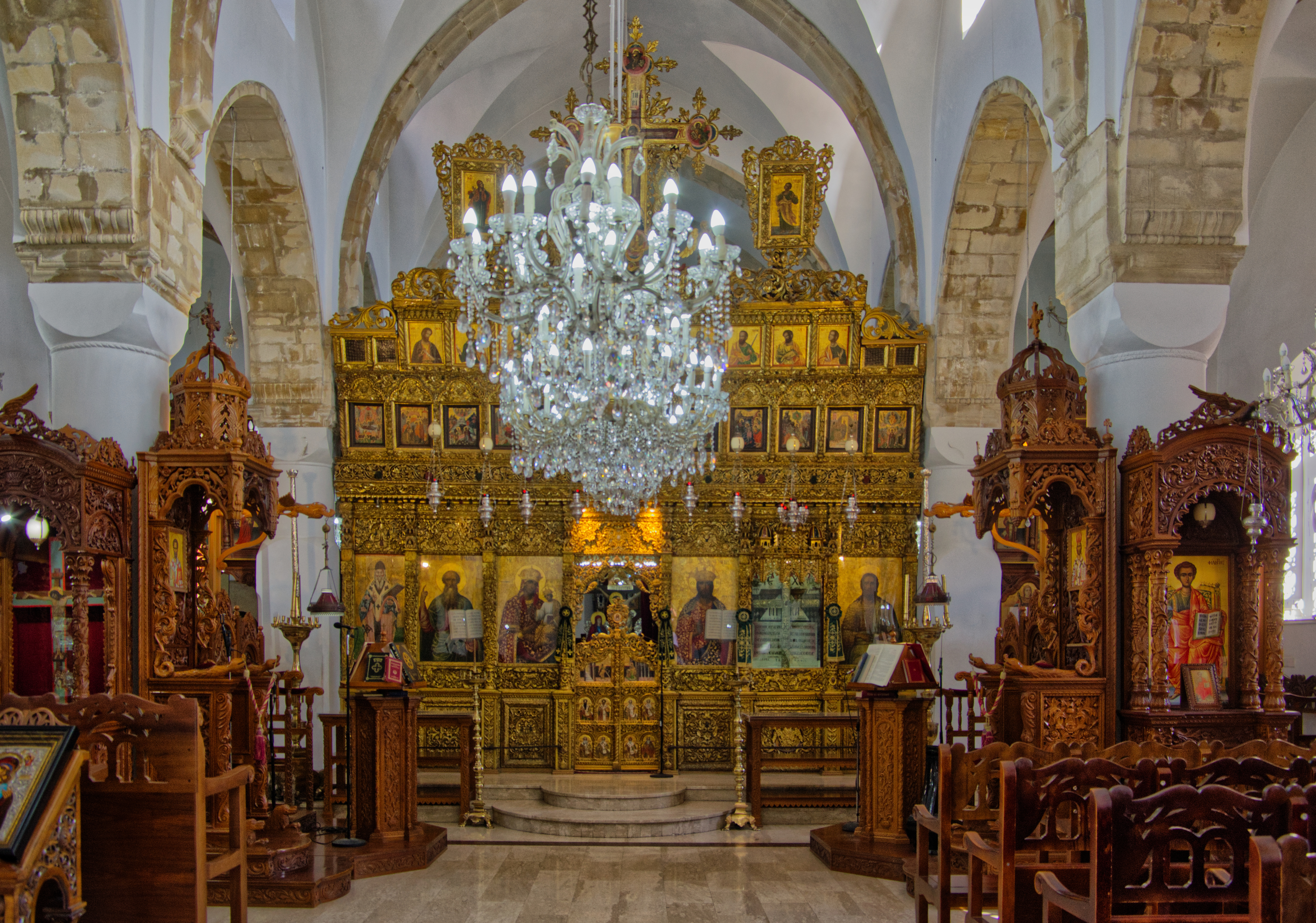
Interior of the church of Holy Cross
