= Sanjak of Delvina =

Ottoman administrative unit between the 16th and 20th century

- Sanjak of Ottoman Empire
- 16th century–1913
- Coat of arms

- Capital: Delvinë, Ergiri
- History
  - Established: 16th century
  - First Balkan War: 3 March
Preceded by	Succeeded by
Sanjak of Avlona	Independent Albania; Kingdom of Greece
- Today part of: Albania; Greece

The Sanjak of Delvina (Turkish: Delvine Sancağı, Albanian: Sanxhaku i Delvinës) was one of the sanjaks of the Ottoman Empire which county town was Delvinë but during the 18th century became Gjirokastër, Albania. It was created in the mid-16th century, came under the control of the Pashalik of Yanina during 1785−1822, and was disestablished after the Balkan Wars in 1913. It was divided between Albania Albania and Greece in 1913.

== Name ==
The Sanjak took its name from the Albanian toponym Delvinë (definite form: Delvina). During the 18th century the local pasha moved the seat of the sanjak from Delvinë to Gjirokastër. Its official name did not change; however, it was also referred to as Sanjak of Gjirokastër.

== History ==
Before the Sanjak of Delvina was established in the mid-16th century, Delvina was a seat of the kaza which belonged to the Sanjak of Avlona. Sanjak of Delvina had the lowest income of 21 sanjaks in Eyalet Rumelia.

The Ottoman defter of 1582 for the Sanjak of Delvina provides numerous insights into the socio-demographic character of 16th-century Delvinë and the surrounding settlements. The region appears to have a larger and more homogeneous or stabilised population structure in comparison to other surveyed regions of Albania, with the vast majority of individuals recorded in the register being attested with their personal name first and then with a patronym which served as their surname – sons being noted after their fathers, clearly displaying kinship ties. For example, in the village of Kakodhiq, a certain Lekë Gjoka is recorded and is followed by his sons Jani, Gjin, and Strati Leka. The demographic stability of the Sanjak of Delvina is further suggested by the minor influx of incomers into the region; however, a handful of internal migrations are attested, examples including Gjin Meksi who was originally from Pandalejmon but had settled in Sopik, and Komnin Dhimo from Vagalat who had settled in Dhivër. A significant portion of the anthroponyms recorded in the register belonged to the Albanian onomastic sphere, including personal names such as Bos, Dedë, Dodë, Gjergj, Gjin, Gjokë, Gjon, Lalë, Lekë, Muzhak, and others. However, more ambiguous or general Christian anthroponyms that were historically used by both Albanian and non-Albanian groups are also attested. The proportion of recorded individuals bearing either an Albanian personal name or patronym by village appear as follows: in Finiq 1/4 bore purely Albanian anthroponyms; in Nivicë over 3/4; in Kakodhiq, Dragopezde, Ufnë, and Izmenicë 1/3; 1/2 in Vagalat; over 1/3 in Livinë; 3/5 in Sopik; around half in Zishtë and Pandalejmon; 4/5 in Pecë; 1/3 in Lefterhor; and 3/4 in Lëkurs. These figures, however, do not take into account kinship ties shared between individuals bearing typical Albanian anthroponymy and those bearing more ambiguous names, and also does not include those bearing names that can be etymologically explained through Albanian (e.g., Bardhi, Buzmiri, Buzuku). As such the ethnic Albanian element must have represented a larger proportion. The register also provides insights into the presence of Islam in the region as a number of local Muslims are recorded. In the villages of Zishtë and Pandalejmon, for example, 19 Muslims are attested. On top of this, some are recorded with typical Christian names albeit are noted as recent converts to Islam.

In 1713 the sanjak-bey of Delvina was Selim Pasha. In 1744 the sanjak-bey of the Sanjak of Delvina was Veli Beg. In 1785 Veli Beg's son, Ali Pasha, became a governor of Delvina, while in the following years the sanjak was part of the Pashalik of Yanina. By 1804 the sanjakbey of Delvina was Ali's son, Veli, who was also a Beylerbey of Rumelia. In 1834 Mahmood Hamdi pasha was appointed to govern the Sanjak of Delvina, Yanina and Avlona.

In 1912 Delvina had 40,000 inhabitants, of which 30,000 were Muslim and 10,000 Christian. 30,000 inhabitants were Albanian speakers, while 5,000 were bilingual in Albanian and Greek. During the Balkan Wars and the subsequent Ottoman defeat, the Greek Army entered the city on March 3, 1913. In June 1914 the town hosted the constituent assembly of the representatives of Northern Epirus that discussed and finally approved the Protocol of Corfu on July 26, 1914. Delvina then became part of the short-lived Autonomous Republic of Northern Epirus.

== Sources ==
- Mikropoulos, Tassos A. (2008). Elevating and Safeguarding Culture Using Tools of the Information Society: Dusty traces of the Muslim culture. Earthlab. ISBN 978-960-233-187-3.
- Malltezi, Orinda (2013). "Low Albania and Europe 1912-1921". In Beshku, Klodiana; Malltezi, Orinda (eds.). Albania and Europe in a Political Regard. Cambridge: Cambridge Scholars Publishing. pp. 17–30. ISBN 978-1-4438-5260-9.
