= Aliko =

Aliko Αλύκο
- Administrative unit
- Location within Albania
- Coordinates: 39°52′N 20°5′E
- Country: Albania
- County: Vlorë
- Municipality: Finiq

Population (2011)
  - Total: 3,849
- Time zone: UTC+1 (CET)
  - Summer (DST): UTC+2 (CEST)
- Postal Code: 9710

Aliko (Albanian definite form: Alikoi; Greek: Αλύκο) is a village and former commune in Vlorë County, southern Albania. At the 2015 local government reform, it became a subdivision of the municipality of Finiq.

== Demographics ==
In addition to the village of Aliko, from which it takes its name and also serves as the administrative center, the unit includes nine other villages – Çaush, Dritas, Halo, Jermë, Neohor, Pllakë, Rahullë, Tremul, and Vurgu i Ri – which are inhabited solely by Greeks.

The population according to the 2011 census was 3,849; according to the civil offices, which count all citizens including those who live abroad, it was 8,818. The latest official census in Albania (2011) has been widely disputed due to irregularities in the procedure, and its results affected by boycott by part of the Greek minority.

== History ==
On 11 December 1990, four young local Greeks were shot dead in their effort to reach Greece by soldiers of the People's Republic of Albania. The killings provoked mass demonstrations by the Greek communities in the region against the regime authorities. Today a monument is erected at the central square of Aliko and commemorative events are being held annually in memory of the victims.
