= Pavlla =

River in Albania and Greece

Pavlla Pavla
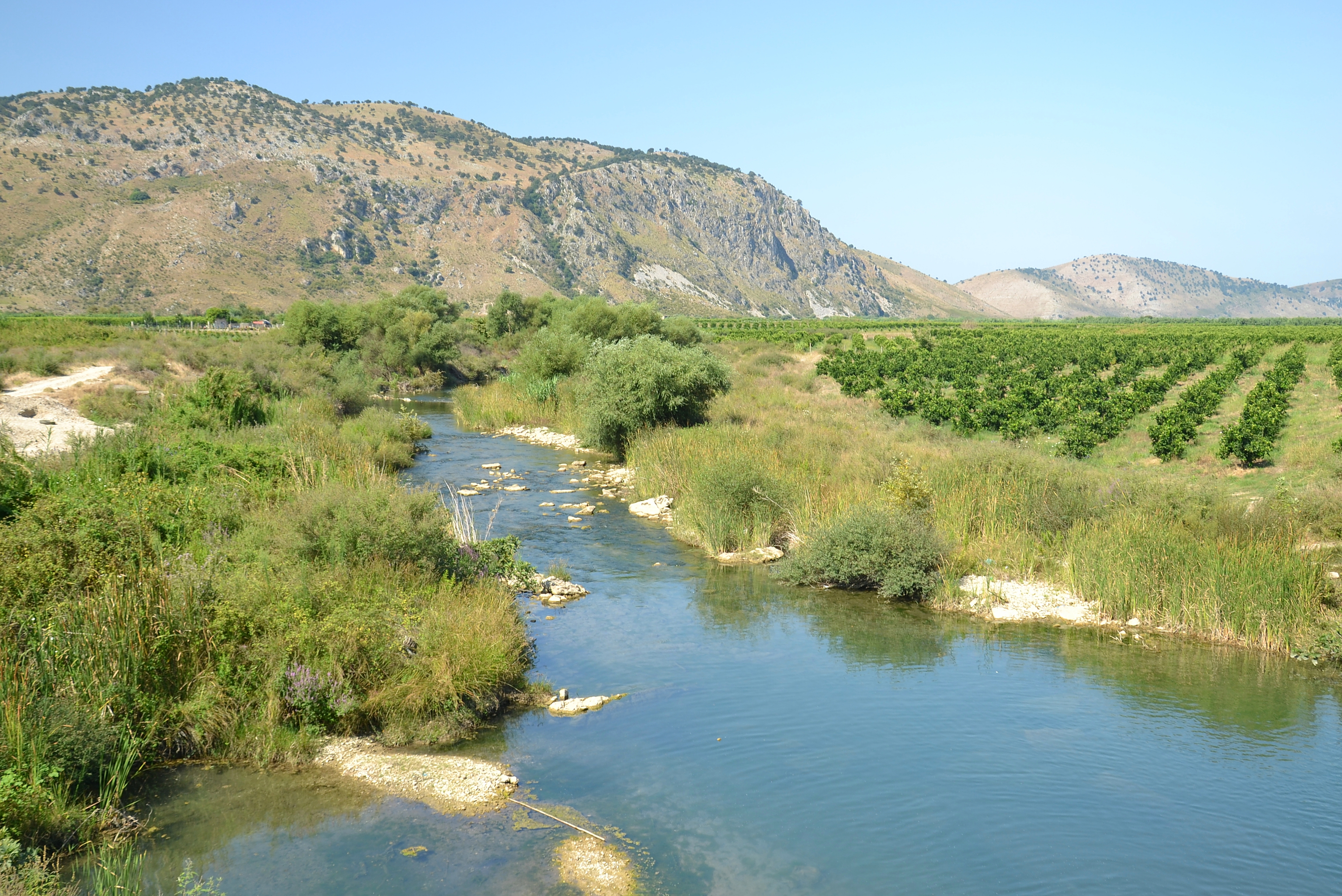
- Pavlla river in 2014
- Native name: Pavllë (Albanian); Παύλα (Greek)

Location
- Countries: Albania and Greece

Physical characteristics
- Source
  - location: Murgana
- Mouth: Ionian Sea, Albania
  - coordinates: 39°43′37″N 19°59′39″E
- Length: 50 km (31 mi)
- Basin size: 374 km^{2} (144 sq mi)
- Discharge
  - average: 6.51 m^{3}/s (230 cu ft/s)

The Pavlla (Albanian: Pavllë) or Pavla (Greek: Παύλα), is a river in southern Albania that flows through the municipality of Sarandë, near the border with Greece. The river is approximately 50 km (31 mi) long and drains a catchment area of 374 km² (144 sq mi), part of which extends into Greek territory. It traverses the plains of Mursi and Vrinë before emptying into the Ionian Sea, south of the Butrint Lagoon.

== Course ==
Pavlla forms part of the southernmost hydrographic system of Albania. Its drainage basin covers an area of 374 km² (144 sq mi) and has a mean elevation of 521 m (1,709 ft) above sea level. The basin is bordered by the Drino watershed to the east, the Kallama basin to the south and the Butrint Lake basin to the west.

The river originates west of the village of Fatrion in Greece and enters Albania after a short course through Greek territory. Its largest tributary is the Karroq (Ksantos) stream, which rises on the southeastern slopes of Mount Stugarë at an altitude of about 1,261 m (4,137 ft).

In its upper reaches, Pavlla flows through a narrow valley bounded by steep limestone slopes. Further downstream, the valley broadens as the river crosses formations of flysch and molasse deposits. Near the village of Komat, the river turns southwest before resuming a northwesterly course in the vicinity of Çiflik.

Upon reaching the Mursi and Vrinë plains, Pavlla follows a regulated channel protected by embankments. The river passes south of the Butrint Lagoon and discharges into the Ionian Sea within the Bay of Butrint.

== Hydrology ==
Pavlla has an average annual discharge of approximately 7.2 m³/s at its mouth, although earlier hydrological measurements have recorded a mean flow of 6.51 m³/s. The basin exhibits a runoff coefficient of about 0.59.

Groundwater supplies nearly 30% of the river’s annual discharge, while surface runoff contributes the remaining 70%. During major flood events with a recurrence probability of 1%, peak discharge has been estimated at 960 m³/s.

The waters of the Pavlla have an average mineral content of approximately 354 mg/L with a hardness of about 12 °dH. Bicarbonates constitute the dominant component of their chemical composition.

== Human activity ==
Historically inhabited by the Cham population, the lower Pavlla valley consisted largely of marshland and seasonally flooded areas. In 1959, extensive land-reclamation projects were undertaken across the Mursi and Vrina plains. As part of these works, the lower course of the river was regulated and a network of irrigation and drainage canals was constructed.

The reclamation transformed large wetland areas into productive agricultural land. Today, the Pavlla and its associated canal system play an important role in the irrigation of farmland throughout the surrounding plains.

== See also ==
- List of rivers of Albania
- List of rivers of Greece
