= Kranë =

Kranë Κρανιά
- Village
- Location within Albania
- Coordinates: 39°53′29″N 20°05′23″E
- Country: Albania
- County: Vlorë
- Municipality: Finiq
- Elevation: 65 m (213 ft)
- Time zone: UTC+1 (CET)
  - Summer (DST): UTC+2 (CEST)

Kranë (Albanian definite form: Krana; Greek: Κρανιά; romanized Kraniá) is a village in Vlorë County, southern Albania. At the 2015 local government reform it became part of the municipality of Finiq.

== History ==
In antiquity it was an Epirote town, known as "Elikranon" (Greek: Ελίκρανον). The ancient ruins can be seen even today. The name "Krania" is firstly mentioned in the Chronicle of the Tocco in 1412. In 1856, the Greek scholar Panagiotis Aravantinos writes about the village: «... a village with 15 houses, of Greek origin, the spoken language is Greek and belongs to the diocese of Delvino.»

In 1925-1926, the village had a Greek school with 50 students and 1 teacher. During World War II the village was burnt by Albanian partisans.

Thimios Lolis (1880-1961) was born in the village, a Greek chieftain who fought in the Macedonian Struggle in the group of Pavlos Melas, the Autonomous Republic of Northern Epirus, the Balkan Wars and in the Greco-Italian War. A monument to honour him exists in the village. Between 2018-19, the Thimios Lolis monument was vandalized twice by Albanian nationalists.

== Demographics ==
In the Ottoman defter of the Sanjak of Delvina from 1431-1432, 4 villages in the area of Vurgu are recorded: Finiki (Finiqi), Vurgo, Jeromi and Krajna, each with very few inhabitants. Among these villages, in the Ottoman register mentioned above typical Albanian names are attested, such as: Gjin, Reçi, Leka, Gjon, Dorza, Meksh Nika and Deda.

Kranë (Krajna) is again recorded in the Ottoman register of 1520 as a settlement in the Sanjak of Delvina with a total of 19 households, the vast majority of attested household heads bearing typical Albanian anthroponyms: Gjin Ilia; Bardh Kola; Gjon Pelegri; Tole Dhima; Gjin Pelegri; Jorgji Kasneci; Nikolla Murojet; Golem Sirpopi; Bardh Lopci; Lekë Lopci; Teodor Istrozi; Martin Gjoni; Martin Kasneci; Dhimo Gjini; Kosta Kalici; Gjon Marini; Kosta Kosta; Deda Gjoni; Gjin Kasneci.

Kranë is subsequently attested in the defter of 1583 in the Sanjak of Delvina where its size had decreased to 9 households, the vast majority of attested household heads bearing Albanian anthroponyms: Gjin Gjoni; Dhimo Gjon Pope; Pope Gjin Pope; Dhimo Kondi; Bard Kondi; Gjon Gjini; Ogos (possibly, Ivgos) Dhimo; Qirko Dhimo; Dhimo Gjini.

The village is inhabited by Greeks and the population was 854 in 1992.

== Notable people ==
- Thimios Lolis (Greek: Θύμιος Λώλης; 1880-1961) Greek chieftain who fought in the Macedonian Struggle, the Balkan Wars, the Struggle for Northern Epirus and the Greco-Italian War
