= Lefter Talo, Finiq =

Lefter Talo Λευτέρη Τάλλιου
- Village
- Location within Albania
- Coordinates: 39°47′29″N 20°6′6″E
- Country: Albania
- County: Vlorë
- Municipality: Finiq
- Administrative unit: Livadhe
- Time zone: UTC+1 (CET)
  - Summer (DST): UTC+2 (CEST)

Lefter Talo (Greek: Λευτέρη Τάλλιος) is a village in the former commune of Livadhe, Vlorë County, southern Albania. At the 2015 local government reform it became a subdivision of the municipality of Finiq.

== Name ==
The name Lefter Talo (Lefteris Talios in Greek) was given to the village by the authorities of the People's Republic of Albania to honour Lefter Talo, a local World War II Albanian resistance leader of Greek ethnicity. (Hero of the People recipient). He was known as one of the most prominent members in the Chameria battalion of the Albanian National Liberation Front. The former name of the village was Hajdëragas and was of Albanian origin with its suffix (-aga) coming from the Turkish title agha. At the Ottoman registers of 1895 it was recorded as Hadir-aga or Haidar-aga. It derived from the name of an Ottoman-era landowner who was in possession of the settlement.

== Demographics ==
The village is inhabited by Greeks, and the population was 178 in 1992.
