= Zminec, Albania =

Zminec Σμίνετσι
- Village
- Location within Albania
- Coordinates: 39°46′59″N 20°16′17″E
- Country: Albania
- County: Vlorë
- Municipality: Finiq
- Administrative unit: Livadhe
- Time zone: UTC+1 (CET)
  - Summer (DST): UTC+2 (CEST)

Zminec (Albanian definite form: Zmineci; Greek: Σμίνετσι) is a village in the former commune of Livadhe, Vlorë County, southern Albania. At the 2015 local government reform it became a subdivision of the municipality of Finiq.

== Name ==
The toponym Zminec is derived from the Bulgarian word змия, zmiya meaning 'snake' and the suffix -ьн-ец, an-ets.

== Demographics ==
The village is inhabited by Greeks and the population was 490 in 1992.
