= Shëndre =

Shëndre Άγιος Ανδρέας
- Village
- Location within Albania
- Coordinates: 39°49′19″N 20°11′46″E
- Country: Albania
- County: Vlorë
- Municipality: Finiq
- Elevation: 339 m (1,112 ft)
- Time zone: UTC+1 (CET)
  - Summer (DST): UTC+2 (CEST)

Shëndre (Albanian definite form: Shëndra; Greek: Άγιος Ανδρέας; romanized: Ágios Andréas) is a small village in Vlorë County, southern Albania. At the 2015 local government reform it became part of the municipality of Finiq. The name of the village in both languages means "Saint Andrew".

== Demographics ==
According to Ottoman statistics, the village had 263 inhabitants in 1895. The village is inhabited by Greeks and the population was 446 in 1992.
