= Komat =

Komat Κομμάτι
- Village
- Location within Albania
- Coordinates: 39°46′33″N 20°9′47″E
- Country: Albania
- County: Vlorë
- Municipality: Finiq
- Administrative unit: Livadhe
- Time zone: UTC+1 (CET)
  - Summer (DST): UTC+2 (CEST)

Komat (Albanian definite form: Komati; Greek: Κομμάτι) is a village in the former commune of Livadhe, Vlorë County, southern Albania. At the 2015 local government reform it became a subdivision of the municipality of Finiq.

== History ==
Komat is recorded in the Ottoman defter of 1583 as a village in the Sanjak of Delvina with a total of 27 households, the majority of those being Muslim and only 10 household heads being Christian. Aside from the general Muslim and Christian anthroponyms attested in the village, Albanian personal names are also recorded: Andrea Kondi; Nikë Andrea; Nikë Kondi; Ahmet Sanik; Sinan Kondi; Nika Guka; Hasan Merusa; Ahmet Ikaqi; Mustafa Ahmet; Ali Sinani; Bajazit Ahmet; Durmish Haxhiu; Sinan Durmishi; Sinan Hasani; Hamza Abdullahu; Dedë Sinani; Ali Abdullahu; Kolep Nika; Ali Andrea; Hasa Jani; Hasan Dhima; Ahmet Mustafai; Hasan Ikaqi; Durmish Sinani; Durmish Ahmeti; Ahmet Haxhiu from Romishta.

== Demographics ==
The village is inhabited by Greeks and the population was 309 in 1992.
