= Qesarat, Finiq =

Qesarat Καισαράτι
- Village
- Location within Albania
- Coordinates: 39°47′8″N 20°11′12″E
- Country: Albania
- County: Vlorë
- Municipality: Finiq
- Administrative unit: Livadhe
- Time zone: UTC+1 (CET)
  - Summer (DST): UTC+2 (CEST)

Qesarat (Albanian definite form: Qesarati, Greek: Καισαράτι) is a village in the former commune of Livadhe, Vlorë County, southern Albania. At the 2015 local government reform it became a subdivision of the municipality of Finiq.

== Name ==
Its name contains the Albanian suffix -at, widely used to form toponyms from personal names and surnames.

== Demographics ==
The village is inhabited by Greeks and the population was 648 in 1992.
