= Ethnic Greek Minority for the Future =

Political party in Albania

Ethnic Greek Minority for the Future Εθνική Ελληνική Μειονότητα για το Μέλλον Minoriteti Etnik Grek për të Ardhmen
- Abbreviation: MEGA
- Leader: Lefter Nika
- Founded: June 21, 2010
- Split from: Unity for Human Rights Party
- Headquarters: Rruga Skenderbeu, Sarandë
- Ideology: Greek minority politics
- Parliament: 0 / 140
- Municipalities: 1 / 61
- Council Seats: 8 / 1,613

Website
- https://www.mega-eemm.com

Ethnic Greek Minority for the Future (Albanian: Minoriteti Etnik Grek për të Ardhmen; Greek: Εθνική Ελληνική Μειονότητα για το Μέλλον; MEGA) is a minor political party in Albania. It primarily represents the interests of Greek minority and is mostly active in southern Albania, especially Finiq.

The party chairman and leader was Kristo Kiço from 2010 up until November of 2024, when Lefter Nika became the new chairman and leader.

== History ==
Ethnic Greek Minority for the Future was founded on 21 June 2010. The foundation came as result of dissatisfaction from the insufficient representation by PBDNJ, a party which has campaigned for Greek minority rights since early 1990s. Instead of national issues, MEGA's intention is to advocate for more and concrete minority rights in the fields of property, security and order, education, bilingualism, culture and tradition.

The party ran for the first time in the 2011 local elections in multiple southern Albanian municipalities. Like Unity for Human Rights Party (PBDNJ), it competed without a coalition with the major parties (PS and PD). MEGA won 5 out of 15 seats in the municipal council of the municipality of Finiq, becoming the largest party in the council. In the mayoral election, the candidate of MEGA, Jani Ziso, lost by just one vote to the candidate of the PBDNJ (the voter turnout was 47% and a winning margin of 0.04%). In the municipalities of Mesopotam and Vergo, MEGA performed worse, losing in the mayoral elections by a large margin and managed to win only two seats in both of their municipal councils. In Pogon, Livadhja, Dropull i Poshtëm and Dropull i Sipërm, MEGA managed to win only 3 seats in each council, while losing the mayoral races by big margins. In Dhivër, the PBDNJ candidate defeated the MEGA candidate, but MEGA tied PBDNJ (four seats) in the municipal council. In Himara, not even a seat was obtained. In Himarë, MEGA got 3.24% in council vote (0 seats) and 3.84% in mayoral race, having a massive defeat.

In the 2015 local elections, elections were held in a new system with larger administrative units. In the municipality of Finiq, Leonidha Hristo was elected mayor. MEGA and PBDNJ each achieved six seats in the municipal council, slightly less than the ASHE coalition of the Socialist Party. In Sarandë and Dropull, MEGA won 1 seat in each of the municipal council. In Konispol no seat was won, in Himara the party did not compete this time. In Konispol, they failed to win any seats. The party didn't compete in Himarë.

The 2019 local elections were boycotted by the opposition. MEGA was one of the few parties that participated. With very low turnout, Kristo Kiço won a mayoral in Finiq with 61% of the vote, being the only non-Socialist candidate to win nationwide. In the municipal council, MEGA won nine seats and was thus the largest party ahead of the Socialists with eight seats (the coalition led by the Socialists achieved twelve seats). In Dropull, three representatives of MEGA were elected to the municipal council, while in Sarandë just one.

In 2023, all parties competed again in the local elections. In Finiq, the MEGA representative Romeo Çakuli was elected mayor with 39% of the votes (18% turnout, very low because many voters did not come from abroad), just ahead of Leonidha Hristo (32%), who had switched to Bashkë Fitojmë and Leonidha Papa (29%), who ran for Basha's faction of PD. Romeo Çakuli was supported from the Socialist Party. In the municipal council of Finiq, MEGA won five seats, tying PBDNJ, but behind PS who seven seats. In Dropull, MEGA was left behind with only 8.8% of the votes and two seats, while the PS scored 15. In Himara, a seat was won with 5.7% of the votes. In Sarandë, MEGA got only 2.3% of the vote.

In the 2013 parliamentary elections, MEGA was part of the coalition with the Partia Demokratike (PD) and the PBDNJ. In the 2017 parliamentary elections, MEGA remained insignificant nationwide with less than 2300 votes nationally. In 2021, MEGA did not compete in the parliamentary elections. They registered in KQZ for the 2025 elections but decided not to participate.

In November 2024, MEGA elected Lefter Nika, an orthopaedic surgeon from Sarandë, as its new chairman. Nika won the majority of votes in internal party elections held across multiple locations, including Sarandë, Tirana, Athens, Finiq, Dropull, and Muzinë, defeating competitors Stefan Moraiti and Ziso Llutsi. The change marked a significant shift in the party's leadership, reflecting an effort to rejuvenate its representation of the Greek minority in Albania.

== Electoral performance ==
=== Parliamentary elections ===
Election	Votes	%	Seats	+/-	Status
2013	3,305	0.19 (#19)	0 / 140	–	Extraparliamentary
2017	2,287	0.14 (#12)	0 / 140	–	Extraparliamentary

=== Local elections ===
==== 2011 Albanian local elections ====
Municipality	Votes	Seats	%	May.
Finiq	695	5 / 15	33.46 (#1)	No
Mesopotam	243	2 / 15	11.30 (#4)	No
Pogon	188	3 / 13	24.51 (#2)	No
Livadhja	469	3 / 17	16.63 (#3)	No
Dropull i Poshtëm	572	3 / 15	21.45 (#2)	No
Dropull i Sipërm	494	3 / 15	18.71 (#3)	No
Dhivër	447	4 / 15	25.01 (#2)	No
Himarë	121	0 / 17	3.24 (#8)	No
Delvinë	57	0 / 17	3.24 (#17)	—
Sarandë	625	1 / 25	5.18 (#7)	—
Qendër Vlorë	426	1 / 17	8.24 (#4)	—
Xarrë	173	1 / 15	7.56 (#5)	—
Aliko	324	2 / 15	13.95 (#3)	No

==== 2015 Albanian local elections ====
Municipality	Votes	Seats	%	May.
Finiq	2,191	5 / 21	26.69 (#1)	Yes
Dropull	403	1 / 21	6.56 (#5)	No
Sarandë	487	1 / 31	3.15 (#7)	—
Konispol	63	0 / 21	1.14 (#18)	—

==== 2019 Albanian local elections ====
Municipality	Votes	Seats	%	May.
Finiq	2,207	9 / 21	40.58 (#1)	Yes
Dropull	375	3 / 21	16.01 (#2)	—
Sarandë	446	1 / 31	4.92 (#4)	—

==== 2023 Albanian local elections ====
Municipality	Votes	Seats	%	May.
Finiq	1,085	5 / 21	18.80 (#3)	Yes
Dropull	397	2 / 21	8.83 (#3)	—
Sarandë	341	0 / 31	2.29 (#13)	—
Himarë	452	1 / 21	5.86 (#3)	—
