= Grazhdan =

Grazhdan Γριάσδανη
- Village
- Location within Albania
- Coordinates: 39°47′46″N 20°14′54″E
- Country: Albania
- County: Vlorë
- Municipality: Finiq
- Administrative unit: Livadhe
- Time zone: UTC+1 (CET)
  - Summer (DST): UTC+2 (CEST)

Grazhdan (Albanian definite form: Grazhdani; Greek: Γριάσδανη; romanized: Griásdani) is a small village in the former commune of Livadhe, Vlorë County, southern Albania. At the 2015 local government reform it became part of the municipality of Finiq.

== Name ==
The possible derivations of Grazhdan are from either from a resident's name, itself from the Bulgarian град, grad for 'city' and the suffix -яне, -yane with the meaning 'an inhabitant of the city' and the Bulgarian sound change d and y into zhd. Or from an Albanian formation from grazhd meaning 'manger' borrowed from the Slavic гражд, grazhd for 'sheepfold', and the suffix an. Linguist Xhelal Ylli writes the stress on the first syllable in both cases does not match the corresponding formation type for the placename.

== Demographics ==
According to Ottoman statistics, the village had 117 inhabitants in 1895.

The village is inhabited by Greeks and the population was 600 in 1992.

== Notable individuals ==
- Nikolaos Stavrou (1935 - 2011), Greek American author and professor at Howard University.
