= Kodër =

Kodër Καλύβια Πασά
- Village
- Location within Albania
- Coordinates: 39°49′15″N 20°7′25″E
- Country: Albania
- County: Vlorë
- Municipality: Finiq
- Administrative unit: Livadhe
- Time zone: UTC+1 (CET)
  - Summer (DST): UTC+2 (CEST)

Kodër (Albanian definite form: Kodra, Greek: Καλύβια Πασά) is a village in the former commune of Livadhe, Vlorë County, southern Albania. At the 2015 local government reform it became a subdivision of the municipality of Finiq.

== Demographics ==
The village is inhabited by Greeks and the population was 591 in 1992.
