= Domenico Mustilli =

Italian archaeologist (1899–1966)

Domenico Mustilli (3 December 1899 - 20 February 1966) was an Italian archaeologist who conducted archaeological research in Italy, Albania, and Kosovo. He contributed significantly to the development of Illyrian studies and Illyrology.

== Biography ==
Domenico Mustilli was born in Naples on 3 December 1899, to Leonardo and Maria Testa. He came from an ancient family from Ravello and participated in World War I, earning military honors. Mustilli graduated from the University of Naples in December 1924 in Classical Archaeology under Giulio Emanuele Rizzo's guidance.

He continued his studies at the Italian Archaeological School in Athens (1926–28) and participated in excavations on Lemnos. Returning to Rome in 1928, he became an assistant professor at the university, where he later contributed extensively to the Museo Mussolini catalog. In 1935, he joined the Naples Superintendency, overseeing Pompeii and Herculaneum. He later became a professor at the University of Naples, focusing on Greek and Roman archaeology.

Mustilli directed the Italian Archaeological Mission in Albania and Kosovo (1938–41), contributing significantly to Illyrian studies. His research spanned from ancient Albanian sites to the historical topography of Greco-Roman Campania and Sicily. He died in Naples on 20 February 1966.

== Publications ==
- La necropoli tirrenica di Efestia (1938)
- Il Museo Mussolini (1939)
- La civiltà preistorica dell'Albania (1940)
- La conquista romana della sponda orientale Adriatica (1941)
- La terre Albanesi redente (1941)
  1. Gli Iliri nell'Epiro
  2. Archeologia del Kossovo
- L'arte del mondo classico (1950, 1956).
