= Margëlliç Castle =

Coordinates: 40.6718°N 19.6673°E

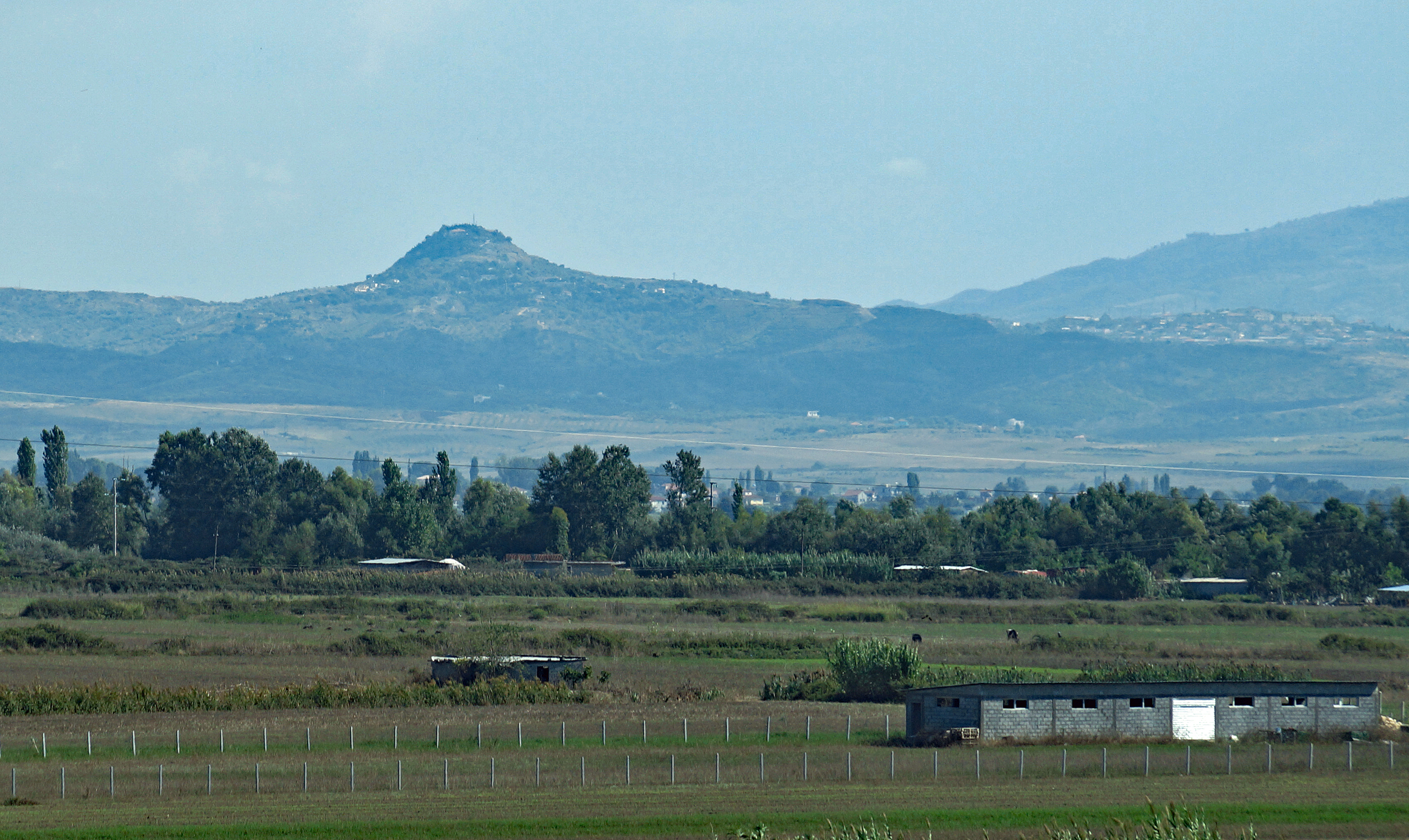
Margëlliç Castle seen on the top of the hill.

Margëlliç Castle (Albanian: Kalaja e Margëlliçit) is a castle in the village of Margëlliç near Patos, western Albania. It is a castle that dates from the 7th century AD and is found on top of a hill. The castle was part of the defence system of the ancient city of Byllis. The castle has also been the scene of a World War II battle between the Wehrmacht and Albanian Partisans. Lefter Talo was killed in this battle defending Albania.

== History ==
An ancient city existed on the pyramid-shaped hill, which provided a strategic location between the Myzeqe plain and the Gjanica valley. There were three construction periods. In the late Bronze and Iron Ages, the fortification consisted of a simple wall made of rubble stone and was around 2 m wide. In the second half of the 4th century BC, a lower castle of around 7 hectares was built with carved stone blocks. The large settlement was damaged by a fire in the 2nd century BC, which could be part of the destruction caused by the Roman general Lucius Aemilius Paullus Macedonicus in 167 BC. The settlement was rebuilt quickly and continued to exist until Late Antiquity. It has been suggested that the settlement was Bargulum, which was mentioned in ancient sources.
