= Jermë =

Jermë Γέρμα
- Village
- Location within Albania
- Coordinates: 39°50′15″N 20°06′20″E
- Country: Albania
- County: Vlorë
- Municipality: Finiq
- Elevation: 120 m (390 ft)
- Time zone: UTC+1 (CET)
  - Summer (DST): UTC+2 (CEST)

Jermë (Albanian definite form: Jerma; Greek: Γέρμα; romanized: Jérma or Gérma) is a small village in Vlorë County, southern Albania. At the 2015 local government reform it became part of the municipality of Finiq.

== Demographics ==
In the Defter of the Sanjak of Delvinë from 1431-1432, 4 villages in the area of Vurgu are recorded: Finiki (Finiqi), Vurgo, Jeromi and Krajna (Kranéja), each with very few inhabitants. Among these villages, in the Ottoman register mentioned above typical Albanian names are attested, such as: Gjin, Reçi, Leka, Gjon, Dorza, Meksh Nika and Deda.

According to Ottoman statistics, the village had 113 inhabitants in 1895. The village is inhabited by Greeks and the population was 444 in 1992.
