= Pllakë =

Pllakë Πλάκα
- Village
- Location within Albania
- Coordinates: 39°48′33″N 20°04′52″E
- Country: Albania
- County: Vlorë
- Municipality: Finiq
- Elevation: 60 m (200 ft)
- Time zone: UTC+1 (CET)
  - Summer (DST): UTC+2 (CEST)
- Website: www.plakabh.blogspot.com

Pllakë (Albanian definite form: Pllaka; Greek: Πλάκα, romanized: Pláka) is a village in Vlorë County, southern Albania. At the 2015 local government reform it became part of the municipality of Finiq.

== Etymology ==
The former name of the village was of Albanian origin: Memushbej (Greek: Μεμούσβεη).

== Demographics ==
According to Ottoman statistics, Pllakë had 71 inhabitants in 1895. The village is inhabited by Greeks, and the population was 489 in 1992.
