= Karahaxhë =

Karahaxhë Καραχάτζι
- Village
- Location within Albania
- Coordinates: 39°54′35″N 20°02′14″E
- Country: Albania
- County: Vlorë
- Municipality: Finiq
- Elevation: 30 m (98 ft)
- Time zone: UTC+1 (CET)
  - Summer (DST): UTC+2 (CEST)

Karahaxhë (Albanian definite form: Karahaxha; Greek: Καραχάτζι, romanized: Karahátzi) is a small village in Vlorë County, southern Albania. At the 2015 local government reform it became part of the municipality of Finiq.

== Demographics ==
According to Ottoman statistics, the village had 31 inhabitants in 1895. The village is inhabited by Greeks and the population was 435 in 1992.
