= Maja e Shën Mërtirit =

- Peninsula
- Location of Maj 'e Shën Mërtirit in Albania
- Coordinates: 40°06′00″N 19°43′00″E
- Country: Albania
- County: Vlorë
- Elevation: 0 m (0 ft)
- Highest elevation: 1,462 m (4,797 ft)
- Time zone: UTC+01:00 (CET)
  - Summer (DST): UTC+02:00 (CEST)
- Geocode: 3184123

Maja e Shën Mërtirit is a Peninsula in Albania. It is located in the prefecture of Vlorë County, in the southern part of the country, 140 km south of the country capital, Tirana.

The terrain of Maja e Shën Mërtirit is hilly in the southeast and mountains in the north. The highest point has an elevation of 1,462 m (4,797 ft) located 7.7 km (4.8 mi) to the north of Maja e Shën Mërtirit. Very few people live in this area. The least densely populated city is Himarë, 2.4 km (1.5 mi) east of Maja 'e Shën Mërtirit. Mountains and lakes are very common in the area of Maja e Shën Mërtirit.

The climate of Maja e Shën Mërtirit is temperate. The annual average temperature is 18 °C (64 °F). The warmest month is July, when the average temperature is 28 °C (82 °F), and the coldest is January, at 10 °C (50 °F). The annual average rainfall is 1,501 mm (59.1 in). The month with the most railfall is February, with an average of 210 mm (8.3 in), and the month with the least rainfall is August, with 24 mm (0.94 in).

Maja 'e Shën Mërtirit

Climate chart (precipitation, max. and min. temperature)
J	F	M	A	M	J	J	A	S	O	N	D
185 13 7	210 15 10	133 14 8	105 17 12	111 20 14	40 26 19	28 31 24	24 30 23	102 26 22	187 22 13	189 19 17	186 17 10
- █ Average max. and min. temperatures in °C
- █ Precipitation totals in mm
- Source: "NASA Earth Observations (NEO)".
Imperial conversion
J	F	M	A	M	J	J	A	S	O	N	D
7.3 55 45	8.3 59 50	5.2 57 46	4.1 63 54	4.4 68 57	1.6 79 66	1.1 88 75	0.9 86 73	4 79 72	7.4 72 55	7.4 66 63	7.3 63 50
- █ Average max. and min. temperatures in °F
- █ Precipitation totals in inches
