= Verboc Fortress =

Cultural heritage monument of Kosovo

Coordinates: 42.68689007°N 20.87654541°E

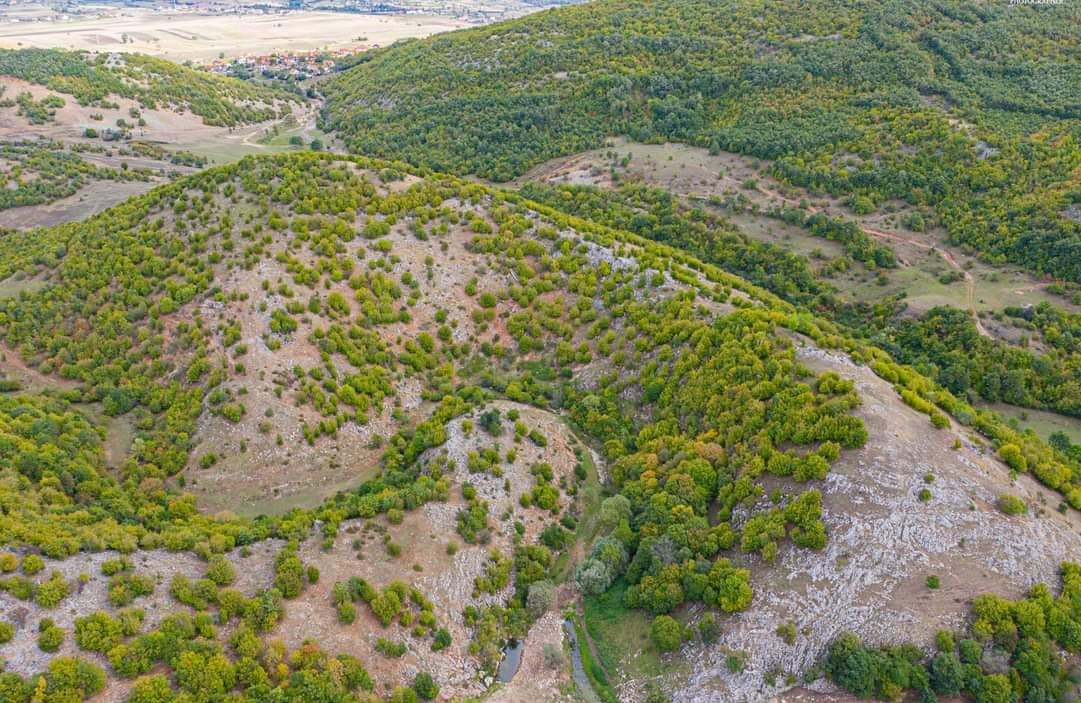
Verboc Fortress

The Verboc Fortress known by local residents simply as Our Fortress is an Illyrian archaeological site located on a hilltop about 2 kilometers from the village of Verboc in Drenas Municipality, Drenica region, Kosovo. Today, it is a monument of Kosovo's cultural heritage with archaeological character.

== Overview ==
The Verboc Fortress dates back to the Illyrian period (around 400 BC to 100 AD). The Illyrians were an ancient Indo-European people who inhabited the western Balkans from the 2nd millennium BC to the 1st century AD. They were known for their hillforts, which were fortified settlements built on hilltops. The Verboc Fortress was one of the largest Illyrian hillforts in Dardania (present days Kosovo).

The fortress consists of an inner and outer wall, as well as a number of towers and gates. The inner wall is about 2 meters thick and 5 meters high. The outer wall is about 1 meter thick and 3 meters high. The towers are about 5 meters square and 10 meters high. The gates are about 2 meters wide and 3 meters high.

The Fortress was partly excavated in the 1970s and 1980s by Skënder Anamali, Muhamet Pirraku and others. The excavations revealed a number of artifacts, including pottery, metal tools, and weapons. These artifacts suggest that the fortress was used for both military and civilian purposes. In the east of the Fortress, the very old road from Drenas to Viciana (today Vushtrri), alternatively known as the Bullaku Road (Rruga e Bullakut), passes through.

== See also ==
- Archaeology of Kosovo
