= Karroq =

Karroq Καρρόκι
- Village
- Location within Albania
- Coordinates: 39°45′1″N 20°15′37″E
- Country: Albania
- County: Vlorë
- Municipality: Finiq
- Administrative unit: Livadhe
- Time zone: UTC+1 (CET)
  - Summer (DST): UTC+2 (CEST)

Karroq (Albanian definite form: Karroqi; Greek: Καρρόκι) is a village in the former commune of Livadhe, Vlorë County, southern Albania. At the 2015 local government reform it became a subdivision of the municipality of Finiq.

== Demographics ==
The village is inhabited by Greeks, and the population was 713 in 1992.
