= Sopik, Finiq =

Sopik
- Village
- Location within Albania
- Coordinates: 39.78°N 20.11°E
- Country: Albania
- County: Vlorë
- Municipality: Finiq
- Administrative unit: Livadhe
- Time zone: UTC+1 (CET)
  - Summer (DST): UTC+2 (CEST)

Sopik is a village in the former commune of Livadhe, Vlorë County, southern Albania. At the 2015 local government reform it became a subdivision of the municipality of Finiq. A 1993 study by Leonidas Kallivretakis found that the total population of the commune was 889, all Orthodox Albanians. Sopik has been effected heavily by immigration, in 2022 there were around 100 inhabitants in the village and only 11 children.
