= Vagalat =

Vagalat Βαγγαλάτι
- Village
- Location within Albania
- Coordinates: 39°45′32.27″N 20°6′58.83″E
- Country: Albania
- County: Vlorë
- Municipality: Finiq
- Administrative unit: Livadhe
- Time zone: UTC+1 (CET)
  - Summer (DST): UTC+2 (CEST)

Vagalat (Albanian definite form: Vagalati, Greek: Βαγγαλάτι) is a village in the former commune of Livadhe, Vlorë County, southern Albania. At the 2015 local government reform it became a subdivision of the municipality of Finiq.

== Name ==
Its name contains the Albanian suffix -at, widely used to form toponyms from personal names and surnames.

== History ==
A fortress was erected on the site of Vagalat during the Hellenistic times as part of the fortification network of Chaonia, the later being inhabited by ancient Greek populations.

== Demographics ==
The Ottoman defter of 1582 for the Sanjak of Delvina provides records for the village of Vagalat. A significant portion of the anthroponyms recorded in the register belonged to the Albanian onomastic sphere, including personal names such as Bos, Dedë, Dodë, Gjergj, Gjin, Gjokë, Gjon, Lalë, Lekë, Muzhak, and others. However, more ambiguous or general Christian anthroponyms that were historically used by both Albanian and non-Albanian groups are also attested. In Vagalat, half of the population recorded bore either an Albanian personal name or patronym. These figures do not take into account kinship ties shared between individuals bearing typical Albanian anthroponymy and those bearing more ambiguous names, and also do not include those bearing names that can be etymologically explained through Albanian (e.g., Bardhi, Buzmiri, Buzuku). As such the ethnic Albanian element must have represented a larger proportion.

A 1992 study by Leonidas Kallivretakis estimated that the total population of the village was 1058, all of them part of the Greek community in Albania.

Vagalat is among the villages in which members of the ethnic Greek minority reside and are recognized as such by the Albanian authorities.
