= Margëlliç =

Margëlliç can refer to two place names:

- The Albanian name for Margariti, Thesprotia, Greece
- Margëlliç, Fier, a village in Fier County, Albania
