= Çaush =

Çaush Τσαούσι
- Village
- Location within Albania
- Coordinates: 39°52′11″N 20°04′15″E
- Country: Albania
- County: Vlorë
- Municipality: Finiq
- Time zone: UTC+1 (CET)
  - Summer (DST): UTC+2 (CEST)
- Postal Code: 9710

Çaush (Albanian definite form: Çaushi; Greek: Τσαούσι; romanized: Tsaoúsi) is a village in Vlorë County, southern Albania. At the 2015 local government reform it became part of the municipality of Finiq.

== Etymology ==
The name of the village is of Albanian origin.

== Demographics ==
According to Ottoman statistics, the village had 128 inhabitants in 1895. The village is inhabited by Greeks and the population was 718 in 1992.
