= Lefter Talo =

Albanian resistance leader, revolutionary, hero of World War II and teacher

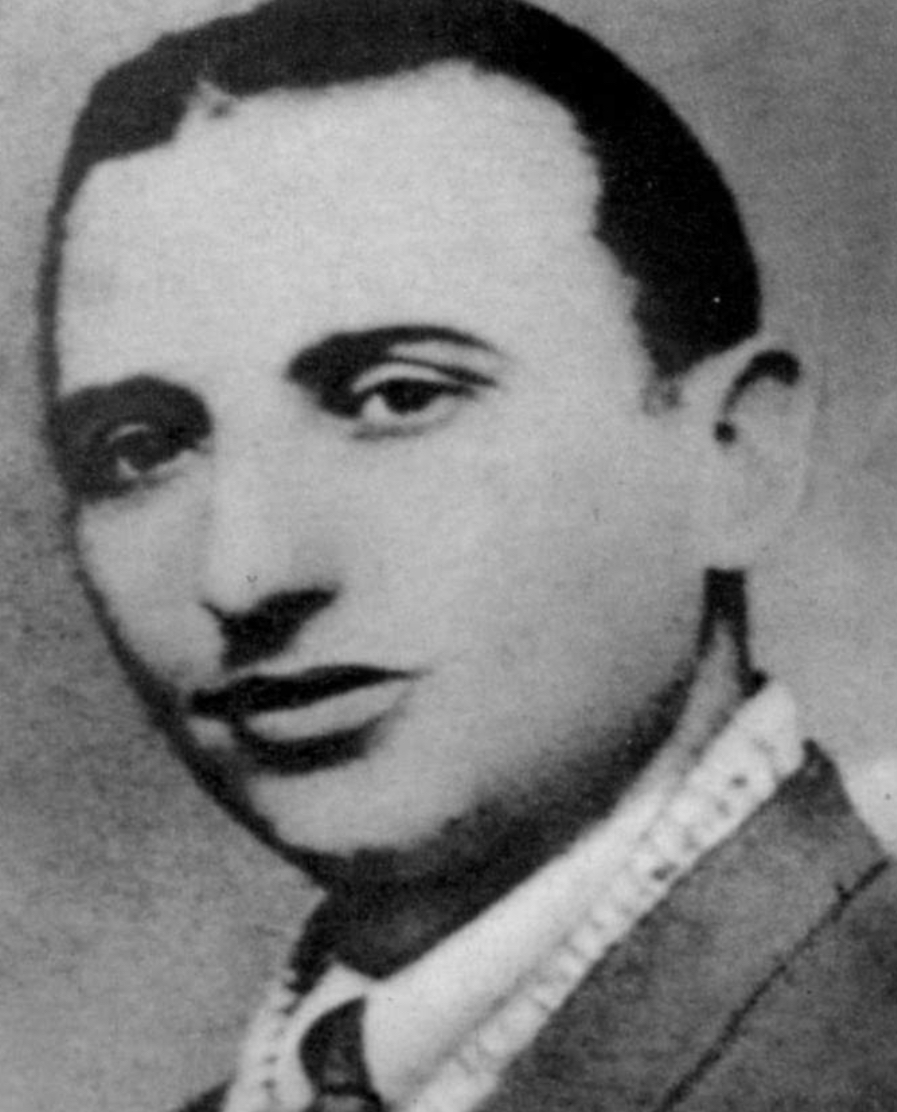
- Born: 1913; Hajdëragas, Albania (modern-day Lefter Talo)
- Died: 29 March 1944 (aged 30–31); Margëlliç, Fier, Albania
- Cause of death: KIA
- Resting place: National Martyrs' Cemetery
- Political party: Party of Labour of Albania
- Awards: Hero of the People
- Military career
- Allegiance: National Liberation Movement (Albania)
- Branch: Çamëria Battalion
- Service years: 1943–1944
- Rank: Commissar

Lefter Talo (Greek: Λευτέρης Τάλλιος, 1913 – 29 March 1944) was an Albanian resistance leader, revolutionary, hero of World War II and a teacher. He was killed in battle fighting German forces in Margëlliç, Fier, Albania in 1944.

== Early life ==
Lefter Talo was born Lefteris Talios (Λευτέρης Τάλλιος) in 1913, in the village of Hajdëragas, Albania (now Lefter Talo), in a local family of Greek background. He attended elementary school in Dhrovjan in the district of Delvinë, Albania, and high school in Filiates, Greece. He finished the university and graduated as a teacher in Elbasan, Albania.

Talo graduated from the Zosimaia Greek language school in Ioannina, Greece. He also studied at the Velas seminary in Greece. After graduating he became a teacher in various Greek schools in southern Albania among them in the villages of Pepel and Cuka.

== Resistance ==
Talo disagreed over the future of the Greek population in southern Albania with Vasileios Sachinis, the latter being the leader of the Northern Epirus Liberation Front (MAVI) that contested the incorporation of northern Epirus to Albania.

== Legacy ==
The name of the village where he was born was changed from "Hajdëragas" to "Lefter Talo".

On 6 June 1944, a battalion named Lefter Talo was created by members of the Greek minority of Albania in Dhivër, Finiq. It was one of three battalions consisting of Greek minority fighters in the Albanian National Liberation Front.

The "Lefter Talo" battalion was attached to battalion "Çamëria" which operated in 1944 in the region between Mallakastër and Chameria (today in Epirus, Greece) was named after him.

- Lefter Talo Street (Rruga Lefter Talo), in Sarandë is named after him.
- Lefter Talo School (Shkolla Lefter Talo), in Livadhe in Finiq municipality is named after him.

Greek poet Yiannis Panos wrote an elegy dedicated to Talo.
