= Pandalejmon =

- Village
- Location within Albania
- Coordinates: 39°46′58.48″N 20°8′28.65″E
- Country: Albania
- County: Vlorë
- Municipality: Finiq
- Administrative unit: Livadhe
- Time zone: UTC+1 (CET)
  - Summer (DST): UTC+2 (CEST)

Pandalejmon (Albanian definite form: Pandalejmoni) is a village in the former commune of Livadhe, Vlorë County, southern Albania. At the 2015 local government reform it became a subdivision of the municipality of Finiq. A 1993 study by Leonidas Kallivretakis found that the total population of the commune was 395, all Cham Albanians.

== Notable people ==
- Selim Islami, Albanian archaeologist
