= Bregas =

Bregas Βρωμερό
- Village
- Location within Albania
- Coordinates: 39°54′7″N 20°1′20″E
- Country: Albania
- County: Vlorë
- Municipality: Finiq
- Administrative unit: Finiq
- Time zone: UTC+1 (CET)
  - Summer (DST): UTC+2 (CEST)

Bregas (Albanian definite form: Bregasi; Greek: Βρωμερό or Βρεμερό) is a village in Vlorë County, southwestern Albania. It is part of the Finiq municipality.

== Demographics ==
The village is inhabited by Greeks and the population was 550 in 1992.
