= Bargulum =

A settlement of the Illyrian tribe of the Parthini

Bargulum was a settlement of the Illyrian tribe of the Parthini in southern Illyria, modern Albania. Its exact location is still unknown, though it has been proposed that it could be linked with present-day Bargullas or the Margëlliç Castle.

== See also ==
- Parthini
- List of settlements in Illyria
