= Lefterhor =

Lefterhor Λευτεροχώρι
- Village
- Location within Albania
- Coordinates: 39°58′50″N 20°05′38″E
- Country: Albania
- County: Vlorë
- Municipality: Delvinë
- Elevation: 640 m (2,100 ft)
- Time zone: UTC+1 (CET)
  - Summer (DST): UTC+2 (CEST)

Lefterhor (Albanian: Lefterhori; Greek: Λευτεροχώρι, romanized: Lefterohóri) is a village in Vlorë County, southern Albania. At the 2015 local government reform it became part of the municipality of Delvinë.

== Demographics ==
The Ottoman defter of 1582 for the Sanjak of Delvina provides records the village of Lefterhor. A significant portion of the anthroponyms recorded in the register belonged to the Albanian onomastic sphere, including personal names such as Bos, Dedë, Dodë, Gjergj, Gjin, Gjokë, Gjon, Lalë, Lekë, Muzhak, and others. However, more ambiguous or general Christian anthroponyms that were historically used by both Albanian and non-Albanian groups are also attested. In Lefterhor, a third of the population recorded bore either an Albanian personal name or patronym. These figures do not take into account kinship ties shared between individuals bearing typical Albanian anthroponymy and those bearing more ambiguous names, and also do not include those bearing names that can be etymologically explained through Albanian (e.g., Bardhi, Buzmiri, Buzuku). As such the ethnic Albanian element must have represented a larger proportion.

According to Ottoman statistics, Lefterhor had 57 inhabitants in 1895. The village is inhabited by Greeks, and the population was 417 in 1992.
