= Pierre Cabanes =

French historian and archaeologist (1930–2023)

Pierre Cabanes (30 December 1930 – 13 June 2023) was a French epigraphist and historian, professor emeritus of the history of antiquity at the University of Paris X-Nanterre, President of the University Clermont-Ferrand II (1977–1982), and head, from 1992, of the French Archaeological and Epigraphic Mission in Albania.

Cabanes was born on 30 December 1930, and died on 13 June 2023, at the age of 92.

== Biography ==
As a child, Pierre Cabanes lived through the war. Two of his older brothers and his father were involved in the French Resistance in the Le Puy-en-Velay region, his hometown, and two of his aunts in the Paris region. One of his uncles, Henri Rendu (1915–1944), was a Companions of Liberation.

It was his maternal grandfather who developed his taste for history. He completed his history studies, first in Lyon and then in Paris, with a Doctorate thesis from the death of Pyrrhus of Epirus to the Epirus (Roman province) conquest (272–168 BC), prepared from 1965 onwards under the supervision of Pierre Lévêque.

After teaching in Nantes, Pierre Cabanes joined the University of Clermont-Ferrand in 1969, where he succeeded Claude Mossé as professor of Greek history. Dean (education) of the Faculty of Letters from 1974 to 1977[5], he was the first president of the Blaise Pascal University (1977-1982).I was then elected Professor of Ancient History at the University of Paris Nanterre University, where he ended his career. He was also president of the Société des professeurs d'histoire ancienne de l'Université (SOPHAU) and of the agrégation externe d'histoire.

In 1992, his fellow archaeologists and historians asked him to co-direct the Apollonia (Illyria), where a French team led by archaeologist Léon Rey had already carried out excavations interrupted by the World War II. From 1976 onwards, he managed to stay regularly in Albania despite the difficult conditions of the Enver Hoxha. Over the years, he forged strong friendships with Professor Aleks Buda, President of the Academy of Sciences, Jusuf Vrioni, French translator of Ismail Kadare work, numerous Albanian archaeologists, as well as the diplomats Besnik Mustafaj, novelist and former Minister of Foreign Affairs, and Luan Rama (diplomat), former Ambassador to France and UNESCO.

== Publications ==
- L'Épire, de la mort de Pyrrhos à la conquête romaine (272-167 av. J.C.), Les Belles Lettres, 1976
- Les états fédéraux de Grèce du Nord-Ouest : pouvoirs locaux et pouvoir fédéral, Athènes, Faculté autonome des sciences politiques, 1981, p. 99-111
- Les Illyriens : de Bardylis à Genthios (IV - II), SEDES, 1988, ISBN 978-2718138442
- Albanie : le pays des aigles, préfacé par Ismail Kadaré; photographies Paul Lutz, Édisud, 1994, ISBN 2857447191
- Le Monde hellénistique. De la mort d'Alexandre à la paix d'Apamée, Points histoire, Nouvelle Histoire de l'Antiquité, vol. 4 Le Seuil, 1995, ISBN 978-2020131308
- with Fa͏ïk Drini: Corpus des inscriptions grecques d'Illyrie méridionale et d'Epire 1,1 : Inscriptions d'Épidamne-Dyrrhachion, Boccard, 1995
- with Neritan Ceka and Hasan Ceka: Corpus des inscriptions grecques d'Illyrie méridionale et d'Epire 1,2 : Inscriptions d'Épidamne-Dyrrhachion et d'Apollonia, Boccard, 1998
- Passions albanaises : de Berisha au Kosovo (co-auteur : son fils Bruno Cabanes), O. Jacob, 1999, ISBN 978-2738106674
- L’Histoire de l’Adriatique, Direction de la rédaction, préface de Jacques Le Goff, le Seuil, coll. L’Univers historique, 2001, ISBN 978-2020282352
- Introduction à l'Histoire de l'Antiquité, 3. edition, Armand Colin, 2004
- with Fa͏ïk Drini: Corpus des inscriptions grecques d'Illyrie méridionale et d'Epire 2 : Inscriptions de Bouthrôtos. École française d'Athènes, 2007
- Le monde grec, 2 édition refondue, Armand Colin, 2008
- Idées reçues sur l'Antiquité : de la Mésopotamie à l'Empire romain, Le Cavalier Bleu, 2014
- Petit atlas historique de l'Antiquité grecque, 2. edition, Armand Colin, 2016
- Corpus des inscriptions grecques d'Illyrie méridionale et d'Epire 3 : Inscriptions d'Albanie (en dehors des sites d'Épidamne-Dyrrhachion, Apollonia et Bouthrôtos). École française d'Athènes, 2016
- Corpus des inscriptions grecques d'Illyrie méridionale et d'Epire 4 : Inscriptions de la Molossie. École française d'Athènes, 2020
- Épire et Illyrie méridionale dans l’Antiquité. Opera selecta. 4 volumes. École française d'Athènes, 2024.

== See also ==
- Illyrology
