= Vurg i Ri =

Vurgu i Ri Καινούργιο or Καινούριο
- Village
- Location within Albania
- Coordinates: 39°48′16″N 20°04′17″E
- Country: Albania
- County: Vlorë
- Municipality: Finiq
- Elevation: 100 m (330 ft)
- Time zone: UTC+1 (CET)
  - Summer (DST): UTC+2 (CEST)

Vurgu i Ri (Greek: Καινούργιο/Καινούριο; romanized: Kainoúrgio/Kainoúrio) is a village in Vlorë County, southern Albania. At the 2015 local government reform it became part of the municipality of Finiq.

== Demographics ==
In the Defter of the Sanjak of Delvinë from 1431-1432, 4 villages in the area of Vurgu are recorded: Finiki (Finiqi), Vurgo, Jeromi and Krajna, each with very few inhabitants. Among these villages, in the Ottoman register mentioned above typical Albanian names are attested, such as: Gjin, Reçi, Leka, Gjon, Dorza, Meksh Nika and Deda.

According to Ottoman statistics, the village had 72 inhabitants in 1895. The village is inhabited by Greeks and the population was 460 in 1992.
