= Villages of Vlorë County =

The Vlorë County in southwestern Albania is subdivided into 7 municipalities. These municipalities contain 205 towns and villages:
