= Irini Qirjako =

Albanian singer (born 1955)

- Born: 21 April 1955 (age 70); Finiq, Albania
- Genres: Albanian folk music; potpourri
- Occupation: Singer
- Years active: 1975–present

Irini Qirjako (born 21 April 1955) is an Albanian folk singer, also known as the 'Nightingale of Labëria'.

== Career ==
Qirjako is one of the most famous folk singers in southern Albania. She sings in the traditional Tosk Albanian folk style as well as potpourri (Albanian: potpuri). She also performs in iso-polyphonic groups that are traditional for southern Albania.

== Discography ==
Albums

- 1998: Këngët e atdheut tim
- 2000: Zura një mike Suljote
- 2003: Dy shelege në një portë
- 2005: Sorkë Moj
- 2007: Më kërkon portë më portë
- 2012: Tundu Bejke

Singles

- 2000: Ç'u mbush mali plot me rrush
- 2003: Do marr çiften, do dal për gjah
- 2005: Oj Zogo
- 2005: Te rrapi në Mashkullorë
- 2015: Mbeçë more shokë, mbeçë
- 2017: Nuse moj sorkadhe
- 2018: S'ka si kjo nuse o
- 2018: Kolazh dasme

== Awards ==
- In 2005, the President of Albania, Alfred Moisiu, awarded her the title Mjeshtre e madhe, the greatest artistic honorary title in Albania.
- Qirjako is decorated Qytetare nderi (Honorary citizen) of Sarandë.
