= Skënder Anamali =

Albanian archaeologist and prehistorian

- Born: 5 May 1921; Shkodër, Albania
- Died: 21 April 1996 (aged 74)
- Education: University of Padua
- Occupations: Archaeologist, historian
- Known for: Koman culture studies; Illyrian–Albanian continuity
- Notable work: Kultura Arbërore e Komanit

Skënder Anamali (5 May 1921 – 21 April 1996) was an Albanian archaeologist, historian and academic, regarded as one of the founders of Albanian archaeology and a leading scholar of late antiquity and the early Middle Ages in Albania. His research played a central role in the study of Illyrian continuity and the early medieval culture of the Albanians.

== Biography ==
=== Early career ===
Skënder Anamali was born on 5 May 1921 in Shkodër, into an intellectual family. After completing his secondary education in his hometown, he pursued higher studies in archaeology at the Faculty of Literature and Philosophy, University of Padua, in Italy.

Anamali initially worked as a journalist for the newspaper Puna, before becoming a high-school teacher in Tirana. In 1947, he was appointed archaeologist at the Institute of Sciences. That same year, together with Hasan Ceka, he began systematic efforts to collect and preserve archaeological materials that had survived wartime damage. In November 1947, they opened the first archaeological museum in Tirana, an event that marked the foundation of Albanian museological archaeology.

Between 1948 and 1952, Anamali carried out numerous exploratory expeditions to major archaeological centers, assembling extensive archaeological material accompanied by detailed reports, which remain of documentary value. From 1952 to 1956, along with Hasan Ceka, Selim Islami and Frano Prendi, he took part in major excavations that laid the foundations of Albanian archaeology, including the investigation of Illyrian tumulus graves in the Mat region, threatened by the construction of hydroelectric power plants.

His fieldwork later expanded to excavations in the Illyrian city of Amantia, Apollonia, Durrës and several medieval fortress cemeteries.

In 1960, Anamali directed excavations at the medieval cemetery of Krujë, where he argued that the material culture represented a direct continuation of late Illyrian traditions.

The historical-archaeological ambiguity related to early Albanian culture remained central to his work throughout his life. He conducted excavations at medieval cemeteries in Koman, Bukël, Shurdhah and other sites, interpreting their material culture as connected to the fortified settlements and urban centers of the period.

During his archaeological expeditions of the 1960s and 1970s in Kosovo, alongside Muhamet Pirraku, he explored the ruins of the castles of Verboc and Kosmaç, in the Drenica region.

His nearly 30 years of research culminated in the monograph Kultura Arbërore e Komanit (1986), published posthumously. In this work, Anamali synthesized archaeological evidence from late antiquity and the early Middle Ages, defining the characteristics of early Albanian culture, its development, indigenous character and its social and economic dynamics during the 7th–8th centuries.

=== Illyrian thesis ===
Using archaeological evidence, Anamali argued that the early Albanian population were direct descendants of the Illyrians, challenging theories that linked the Koman culture to Slavic or Avaro-Slavic origins. His work provided archaeological support to linguistic theories advanced earlier by Eqrem Çabej, particularly the thesis that Albanian is a descendant of Illyrian. He contributed to the resolution of debates on Albanian ethnogenesis, notably through their presentations at the Illyrian Studies Conferences in 1972 and 1985.

=== Epigraphy and ancient history ===
Anamali was also a specialist in ancient epigraphy. Over four decades of fieldwork, he collected, copied and transcribed numerous Latin inscriptions discovered in Albania. Based on this material, he prepared a dedicated volume of inscriptions, produced in collaboration with the French Academy in Rome, which entered the process of publication.

In recognition of his contributions, in 1988 he was elected a member of the International Association for Greek and Latin Epigraphy, headquartered in Paris.

As a historian of antiquity, he contributed to the History of Albania (medieval period), authoring, among other sections, the chapters "Dardanian Kingdom" and the "Dalmatian Federation", which offered a comprehensive political history of the Dardanian state and highlighted its continuity beyond Romanization.

=== Teaching and museology ===
For years, Anamali lectured on the ancient history of Albania at the Faculty of History and Philology, University of Tirana. He was particularly known for his work-based teaching approach, emphasizing archaeological interpretation in the field and mentoring generations of young archaeologists, many of whom later became academic professionals.

He also made significant contributions to Albanian museology, as co-founder of the Archaeological Museum of Tirana, the first pavilion of the National History Museum, the Arms Museum in Gjirokastër, the Skanderbeg Museum in Krujë and several regional archaeological museum pavilions.

=== Published works ===
Skënder Anamali authored over 70 scientific articles, reports and conference papers published in Albania and abroad. He participated actively in international scholarly conferences in cities including Sofia, Belgrade, Bucharest, Taranto, Cortona, Lyon and Clermont-Ferrand, where he consistently defended the archaeological evidence for Albanian autochthony.

He died on 21 April 1996 after a serious illness. Colleagues and students remembered him not only for his scholarly rigor and intellectual clarity, but also for his modesty, calm temperament and collegial spirit. His work remains foundational in Albanian archaeology and in the study of early Albanian cultural and historical continuity.

- Illyrians and Illyria among ancient authors (Ilirët dhe Iliria tek autorët antikë), 1965
- The History of Albania vol. I (Historia e Shqipërisë), 1959
- Mosaiques de l'Albanie (with Stilian Adhami), 1974
- Archaeology and Agriculture (Arkeologjia dhe bujqësia), 1980
- Corpus des inscriptions latines d'Albanie, 2009
- Historia e popullit shqiptar, 2002–2008

== See also ==
- History of Albania
- List of museums in Albania
