= Murgana =

Summit in Albania and Greece

Maja e Murganës
- Μουργκάνα
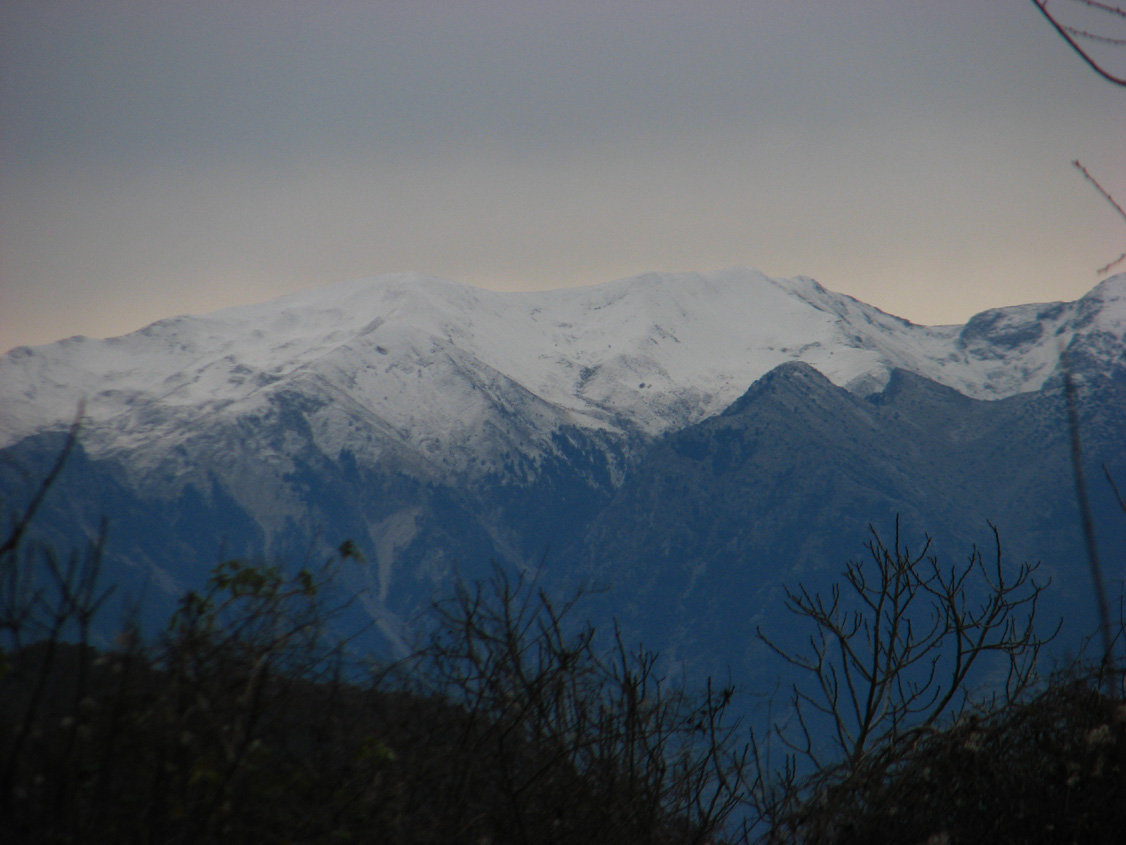
- Murgana peak from a distance

Highest point
- Elevation: 1,806 m (5,925 ft)
- Prominence: 1,247 m (4,091 ft)
- Isolation: 32.1 km (19.9 mi)
- Listing: Ribu
- Coordinates: 39°47′35″N 20°23′34″E

Naming
- English translation: Dark side

Geography
- Location within Albania Location within Greece
- Countries: Albania; Greece
- Region: Southern Mountain Region
- Municipality: Gjirokastër, Filiates
- Parent range: Mali i Gjerë-Stugarë

Geology
- Rock age(s): Cretaceous, Paleogene
- Mountain type: mountain
- Rock type: limestone

Murgana (lit. 'Dark side') is a summit in southern Albania and northern Greece. Rising to an elevation of 1,806 m (5,925 ft), it constitutes the highest peak of the Mali i Gjerë–Stugarë range.

== Etymology ==
In Albanian, Murgana is a compound in its definite form, combining the words murg and anë, which translates to "Dark side". Although murg is most commonly understood to mean monk, it can also be interpreted as dark or shadowed. The name perhaps derives from the often shaded northern face of the summit, as observed from satellite imagery.

== Geography ==
The summit lies southeast of Muzinë Pass, where the Mali i Gjerë–Stugarë range continues toward the border region. It is then connected to a number of peaks including Muzinë (1,155 m), Platevuni (1,160 m), Kërrës (1,225 m) and Stugarë (1,760 m), forming a continuous mountain corridor. The southeastern extension of the ridge culminates at Murgana, which geographically marks the outermost section of the range.

== Geology ==
Murgana is characterized by steep, rugged walls in its summit area, particularly along the northeastern side. Multiple cirque headwalls are clearly visible from afar.

From the mountain, deeply incised valleys descend toward Xeria, separated by prominent spurs that support a number of secondary peaks. This pattern of slope dissection closely resembles that observed on the eastern flank of the Nemërçka massif beneath their large cirques, although elsewhere the range appears less heavily dissected.

Below the settlements of Goranxi, Selo and Glishar, hillside streams cut through limestone formations, carving short but narrow gorges into a smaller secondary anticline ridge that merges with the base of the mountain.

== See also ==
- List of mountains in Albania
- List of mountains in Greece
