= Stugarë =

Mountain in Albania

- Mali i Stugarës
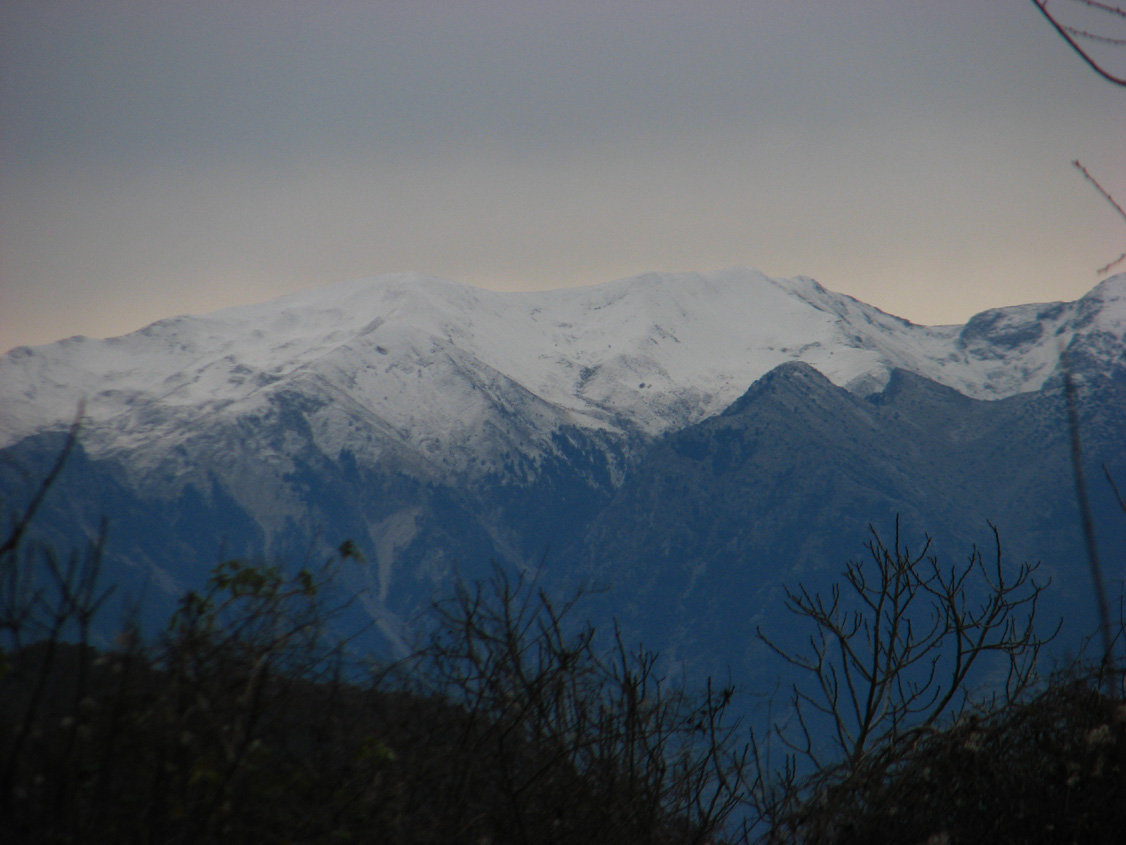
- View of Murgana peak

Highest point
- Elevation: 1,806 m (5,925 ft)
- Prominence: 419 m (1,375 ft)
- Isolation: 1,594 m (5,230 ft)
- Coordinates: 39°48′19″N 20°17′21″E

Geography
- Location within Albania Location within Greece
- Countries: Albania; Greece
- Region: Southern Mountain Region
- Municipality: Gjirokastër
- Parent range: Mali i Gjerë-Stugarë

Geology
- Rock age(s): Cretaceous, Paleogene
- Mountain type: mountain
- Rock type: limestone

Stugarë (def. 'Stugara') is a mountain located at the southernmost end of Gjirokastër municipality, in southern Albania. Forming part of the Mali i Gjerë–Stugarë mountain range, it stretches from Leshnicë e Sipërme in the north-west, to its highest peak, Maja e Murganës, in the south-east, reaching a height of 1,806 m (5,925 ft).

== Geology ==
Composed primarily of Cretaceous and Paleogene limestone, the ridge of the mountain is dome-shaped, with a gradual decline towards the northwest, separating the watershed of Drino from that of Pavllë. The eastern slope has a gradual incline and is intersected by various seasonal streams. Woodland is sparse, however, vegetation such as shrubs, oak trees and medicinal herbs, particularly sage, are abundant. This area is utilized for grazing livestock during the summer season.

== See also ==
- List of mountains in Albania
- List of mountains in Greece
