= Illyrology =

Study of ancient Illyrians and their culture

Illyrology or Illyrian studies is interdisciplinary academic field which focuses on scientific study of Illyria and Illyrians as a regional and thematic branch of the larger disciplines of ancient history and archaeology. A practitioner of the discipline is called Illyrologist. His duty is to investigate the range of ancient Illyrian history, culture, art, language, heraldry, numizmatic, mythology, economics, ethics, etc. from c. 1000 BC up to the end of Roman rule around the 5th century.

== History ==
Written studies about the Illyrians and Illyria, their history and cultures, go back to classical antiquity with Greco-Roman historiography and accounts, possibly beginning with Hesiod, Hecataeus and Herodotus and best known through such authors as Thucydides, Aristotle, Polybius, Velleius Paterculus Suetonius, Pausanias, Appian, Cassius Dio, Diodorus Siculus, Julius Caesar, Strabo, Titus Livius, Pliny the Elder, Pomponius Mela, Polyaenus, St. Jerome etc. Modern Illyrian studies originated in the late 18th and early 19th century, with the contributions of Johann Erich Thunmann, Arthur Evans, Hans Krahe, etc. when many of these classical authors were rediscovered, published, translated and studied. In archaeological, cultural, historical and linguistic studies, research about the Illyrians, from the late 18th to the 21st century, has moved from the Illyrian movement and Pan-Illyrian theories, which identified as Illyrians some groups north of the Balkans and in Continental Europe (mainly in Central Europe), even in Northern Europe (Max Vasmer, 1928 Julius Pokorny, 1936) to more well-defined groupings based on Illyrian onomastics and material anthropology since the 1960s as newer inscriptions were found and sites excavated.

== Institutions ==
- University of Tirana
- University of Pristina
- University of Sarajevo
- University of Montenegro
- State University of Tetova
- Academy of Albanological Studies

== Illyrologists ==
- Carl Patsch (1865 - 1945)
- Hans Krahe (1898 - 1965)
- Alojz Benac (1914 - 1992)
- Skënder Anamali (1921 - 1996)
- Selim Islami (1923 - 2001)
- Aleksandar Stipčević (1930 - 2015)
- Pierre Cabanes (1930 - 2023)
- John J. Wilkes (1936 - present)
- Muzafer Korkuti (1936 - present)
- Neritan Ceka (1941 - present)

== See also ==
- Illyria
- Illyrians
- Balkan studies
- Illyrian coinage
- Illyrian kingdom
- Illyri proprie dicti
- Illyrian armorials
- Illyrian mythology
- Illyrian movement
- Illyricum (Roman province)
- Praetorian prefecture of Illyricum
