= Selim Islami =

Albanian archaeologist

Selim Islami (March 18, 1923 – October 26, 2001) was an Albanian archaeologist and historian. He contributed to the development of Illyrian studies in Albania.

== Biography ==
Selim Islami was born in Pandalejmon, Sarandë District, Albania. He completed his primary education in Saranda and secondary education in Elbasan. In 1951 he graduated from the Moscow University and returned to Albania, where he worked for around forty years at the Albanian Academy of Sciences as an archaeologist.

He was the director of the Archaeological Museum in Tirana, for over ten years he headed its archaeological department. He was also vice-dean of the Faculty of History and Philology of the University of Tirana. In 1973 he was awarded the title of professor.

== Selected publications ==
- (in Albanian) Historia e Shqipërisë (History of Albania), 1959, 1967, with Kristo Frashëri, Stefanaq Pollo, Aleks Buda
- (in French) Nouvelles données sur l'antiquité illyrienne dans le territoire albanais 1962
- (in Albanian) Iliria në mijëvjeçarin e I p.e.s. (Illyria in the 1st millennium BC), 1964 with Hasan Ceka
- (in Albanian) Ilirët dhe Iliria te autorët antikë (The Illyrians and Illyria in ancient authors), 1965, with Frano Prendi; Hasan Ceka, Skënder Anamali
- (in French) Le Monnayage de Skodra, Lissos et Genthios, 1966
- (in Albanian) Historia e popullit shqiptar (History of Albanians), 1969, with Kristo Frashëri, Aleks Buda
- (in French) L' Etat Illyrien, sa place et son role dans le monde mediterraneen, 1972
- (in French) L'Epire ancienare (Reflexion sur le probleme ethnique), 1972
- (in Albanian) Shteti ilir, vendi dhe roli i tij në botën mesdhetare, 1974
- (in Albanian) Epiri antik : vështrim i shkurtër etnologjik, 1984
- (in French) Les Illyriens : aperçu historique, 1985, with Skënder Anamali, Muzafer Korkuti, Frano Prendi
- (in English) Problems of Illyrian History, 1998
- (in Albanian) Historia e ilirëve (History of Illyrians), 2008, with Mimoza Verzivolli

== See also ==
- Academy of Albanological Studies
