= Margëlliç, Fier =

Margëlliç
- Village
- Location within Albania
- Coordinates: 40°40′19″N 19°39′40″E
- Country: Albania
- County: Fier
- Municipality: Patos
- Administrative unit: Patos
- Time zone: UTC+1 (CET)
  - Summer (DST): UTC+2 (CEST)

Margëlliç is a small community of the Fier County, southern Albania. It is part of the municipality Patos. The settlement is close to the Margëlliç Castle and the ancient city of Byllis.

== History ==
In the 7th century the Margëlliç Castle was built by the Byzantines in the village. In WW2 a battle took place between Albanian Partisans and Nazi Germany in the village. Lefter Talo was killed in this battle, defending Albania. The village is ethnically inhabited by Albanians.
