= Livadhe =

Livadhe Λιβαδειά
- Administrative unit
- Location within Albania
- Coordinates: 39°47′N 20°7′E
- Country: Albania
- County: Vlorë
- Municipality: Finiq

Population (2011)
  - Administrative unit: 1,165
- Time zone: UTC+1 (CET)
  - Summer (DST): UTC+2 (CEST)

Livadhe (Albanian definite form: Livadhja; Greek: Λιβαδειά) is a village and a former commune in Vlorë County, southern Albania. At the 2015 local government reform it became a subdivision of the municipality Finiq. The population at the 2011 census was 1,165.

== Demographics ==
The villages Livadhja, Kulluricë, Llazat, Kalcat, Kodër, Lefter Talo, Vagalat, Gravë, Qesarat, Komat, Karroq, Grazhdan, and Zminec are inhabited solely by Greeks, while Sopik is inhabited by an Orthodox Albanian population and Pandalejmon by Muslim Cham Albanians. A demographic study by Leonidas Kallivretakis in 1992, found that the population of the commune consisted of approximately 85% ethnic Greek Christians, 10% Albanian Christians, and 5% Cham Albanian Muslims.
