= Greek ethnicity =

Aspect of personal legal status in Greece

Greek ethnicity and Greek citizenship are two distinct legal statuses, both being derived from Greek citizenship law. Thus, Greek ethnicity establishes the requirement for the right to apply for Greek citizenship due to descent.

== Significance ==
For the Greeks, even today, ethnicity has greater significance than for many other peoples. After all, during the three century long Islamic-Ottoman occupation, the Greeks managed to preserve their culture, Greek Orthodox faith, language and identity unharmed; and from 1821 onwards, they were able to re-establish their own sovereign state with an intact ethnicity. Therefore, the concept of ethnicity has a positive connotation even in modern Greece, while the idea of ethnicity is considered rather problematic in other peoples, for example in Germany due to the murderous-ethnic Hitler dictatorship or in the neighboring territory of former Yugoslavia, where ethnically based wars cost hundreds of thousands of lives in the 1990s. Greek ethnic patriotism, on the other hand, is considered inclusive, cosmopolitan, progressive and non-racist, similar to Scottish nationalism with its independence aspirations.

== Diaspora ==
About five million ethnic Greeks live outside Greece. This means that around one-third of all ethnic Greeks do not live in Greece, many with foreign citizenships. Nevertheless, the Greek diaspora, like the Armenian diaspora or the Jewish one, counts as culturally preserved. According to ethnologists, this phenomenon is practically exclusive to "ancient" peoples with their own religion, script and distinct mythology. Therefore, the Greek diaspora does not shrink, as is the case with other emigrant groups, but is culturally passed on to the next generations regardless of place of residence or citizenship.

== Legal situation ==
Greek citizenship law includes aspects that take into account the expansion of the Greek people abroad as well. For example, Greece is one of the very few countries, along with Italy, that derives the ethnicity of its people and the right to acquire citizenship from a single grandparent. This means that anyone who has a grandmother or grandfather who was born as a Greek in Greece is an ethnic Greek and can apply for citizenship, even if their own parents never exercised this right. The concept of Greek ethnicity documents is rooted is this broader context. The next generations of Greeks not losing a sense for their Greek ethnicity is one central goal of documenting officially the status as an ethnic Greek, a concept that Greece shares with other countries with a large diaspora like Israel, Armenia, Poland and many eastern European and Balkan states. Being of Greek descent is considered a serious matter with many Greek missions abroad offer consular protection not only to citizens but also to ethnic Greeks ("people of Greek descent").

== Other peoples ==
Comparable concepts exist in Poland, where, as a result of multiple shifts of national territory, numerous Poles now live involuntarily in neighboring foreign countries. Israel is another such example, which, with its very particular history, places considerable emphasis on the preservation of Jewish religion and ethnicity.
