= Mali i Gjerë =

Mountain in Albania

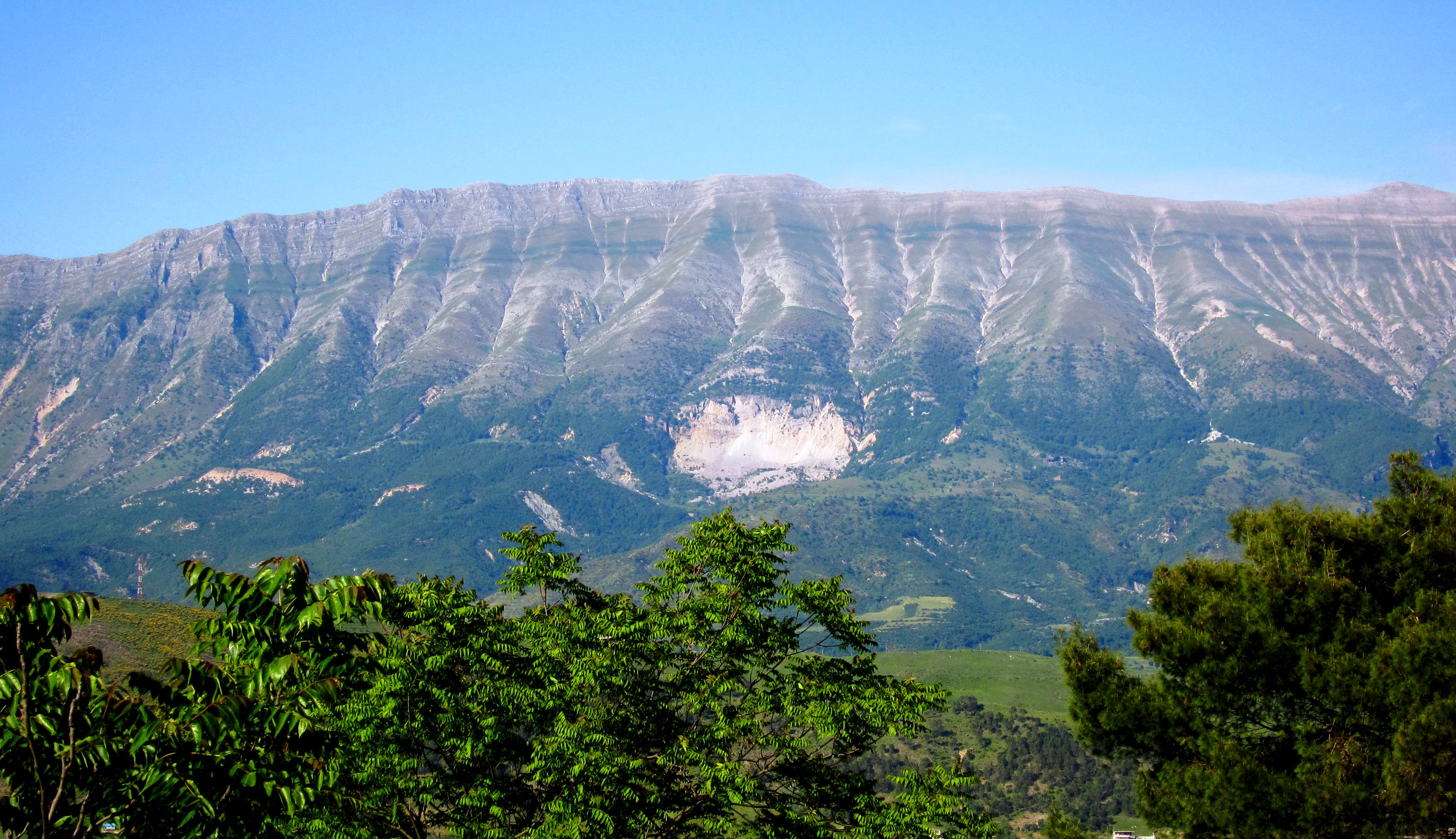
- View of Mali i Gjerë from Gjirokastër

Highest point
- Elevation: 1,789 m (5,869 ft)
- Prominence: 972 m (3,189 ft)
- Isolation: 464 m (1,522 ft)
- Coordinates: 40°05′20″N 20°03′44″E

Naming
- English translation: Wide Mountain

Geography
- Location within Albania
- Country: Albania
- Region: Southern Mountain Region
- Municipality: Gjirokastër, Sarandë, Delvinë
- Parent range: Mali i Gjerë-Stugarë

Geology
- Rock age(s): Mesozoic, Paleogene
- Mountain type: massif
- Rock type: limestone

Mali i Gjerë (lit. 'Wide Mountain') is a massif located between the municipalities of Sarandë and Gjirokastër, in southern Albania. It constitutes the watershed boundary of the Delvinë basin and the Drino valley as well as the waters that flow into the Adriatic and Ionian seas. The highest point is Maja e Frashërit, reaching a height of 1,789 m (5,869 ft). Other peaks include Maja e Kikshajt 1,782 m (5,846 ft), Maja e Nikollasit 1,584 m (5,197 ft), Maja e Bidos 1,543 m (5,062 ft), Maja e Pilloit 1,592 m (5,223 ft), etc.

== Etymology ==
The mountain is referred to as Mali i Gjerë in Albanian and as Platovouni (Greek: Πλατοβουνι) in Greek, with both names conveying the same meaning of a broad or wide mountain.

== Geology ==
Mali i Gjerë stretches from the valley of Kardhiq in the northwest to Qafa e Muzinës 540 m (1,770 ft) in the south, at a length of about 30 km (19 mi). The massif is composed of Mesozoic and Paleogene limestone that form a large asymmetric anticlinal structure with a less steep eastern flank and a western flank separated by a tectonic overthrust. The watershed ridge as well as the wide eastern slope gently incline (hence the name), and are filled with various forms of karst erosion. The main passes are Muzina, Sopot and Skërficka.

== Biodiversity ==
At the southwestern and northeastern foothills are found a number of karst springs (Bistrica, Vërgoi, Viroi). The main tributary is sourced from a well-known karst spring called the Blue Eye (Albanian: Syri i Kaltër), which is a popular tourist attraction due to its scenic environment. Woodland is scarce, but the area is rich in summer pastures and several types of medicinal plants (tea, orchid, hawthorn, yarrow, oregano). Among the wild animals, the mountain partridge is commonly encountered.

The eastern slope of the mountain is surrounded by the nearby settlements of Gjirokastër, Dropull i Poshtëm, Lazarat and Mashkullorë, while on the western slope are situated Delvinë and the village of Rrëzoma.

The karst massif spreads mostly within Albania, covering about 440 km^{2} (170 sq mi), with 54 km^{2} (21 sq mi) extending into the Greek territory.

== Human history ==
In antiquity, the Mali i Gjerë range divided the territory of the ancient Greek tribe of the Chaonians in two parts; the western part centered around Phoenice and the eastern one centered around Antigonea.

== See also ==
- List of mountains in Albania
