= Muhamet Pirraku =

Kosovan historian (1944–2014)

Muhamet Pirraku (1944–2014), was Albanian historian and publicist from Kosovo.

== Biography ==
Pirraku was born on October 12, 1944, in Flamuras, Drenas. Pirraku completed his elementary education in Flamuras and Komoran, secondary education in Drenas. He pursued higher education at the Faculty of Philosophy of the University of Prishtina, specializing in History. Subsequently, he earned his master's degree from the University of Zagreb in 1976. Pirraku obtained his Ph.D. from the University of Prishtina in 1988, focusing on “Albanian Culture from the 18th Century to 1878.”

Engaged in political activities advocating for Kosovo's self-determination and Albanian unity, Pirraku was associated with the intellectual group “Çeta e Bajo e Çerçiz Topulli.” Despite facing political challenges, he continued to disseminate literature, philosophy, and historical works within Albania and among the Albanian diaspora in Europe and the United States.

Pirraku faced restrictions on publishing and scholarly activities due to his political views. He endured bans and obstacles for over 15 years, including a decade of complete prohibition. From August 1981 to August 1982, he was imprisoned in various detention centers in Pristina, Mitrovica, and Sarajevo, during which his handwritten historical notes, scientific papers, diaries, and poetry were confiscated.

Despite challenges, Pirraku pursued creative endeavors, working as a skilled mason and designer in the early 1980s. He continued contributing to political and historical discourse, leaving a lasting impact on Albanian intellectual life. His legacy includes numerous anonymous publications, studies, and two significant works dedicated to Isa Boletini and Hasan Prishtina. Muhamet Pirraku's dedication to preserving Albanian heritage and advancing historical knowledge remains evident in his enduring influence and commitment.

== Publications ==
- Kultura Kombëtare Shqiptare deri në Lidhjen e Prizrenit (Albanian National Culture up to the League of Prizren) Prishtinë, 1989, OCLC 21409391
- Ripushtimi jugosllav i Kosovës 1945 (Yugoslav Reoccupation of Kosovo 1945), Prishtinë, 1992,
- Kalvari i shqiptarësisë së Kosovës (The Calvary of Albanianism in Kosovo), Tivari 1945, Prishtinë, 1993,
- Mulla Idris Gjilani dhe Mbrojtja Kombëtare e Kosovës Lindore 1941- 1951 (Mulla Idris Gjilani and the National Defense of Eastern Kosovo 1941-1951), Prishtinë, 1995, OCLC 51215098
- Feja, kultura dhe tradita islame ndër shqiptarët (Religion, Culture, and Islamic Tradition among Albanians) (coauthor & editor), Prishtinë, 1995,
- Lëvizja Gjithëpopullore Shqiptare për Faljen e Gjaqeve 1990-1992. Kronikë (The All-Albanian Movement for the Forgiveness of Blood Feuds 1990-1992. Chronicle), Prishtinë, 1998,
- Për kauzën shqiptare (For the Albanian cause) 2000, OCLC 956922827
- Dritë e re për kryetarin e parë të Shqipërisë Etnike (A New Light on the First Chairman of Ethnic Albania) (coauthor & editor), Prishtinë, 2002,
- Myderriz Ymer Prizreni – Ora, Zemra dhe Shpirti i Lidhjes Shqiptare 1877-1887 (Myderriz Ymer Prizreni – The Hour, Heart, and Spirit of the Albanian League 1877-1887), Prishtinë, 2003,
- Masakra në Burgun e Dubravës 19-24 maj 1999 (Massacre at Dubrava Prison May 19–24, 1999) (coauthor & editor), Prishtinë 2005,
- Për kauzën e UÇK-së (For the Cause of the KLA), Prishtinë, 2006,
- Martirët e Shqipërisë Etnike nga Dera e Stak Mark Mirditës në kujtesën historike (Martyrs of Ethnic Albania from the Door of Stak Mark Mirdita in Historical Memory), Prishtinë, 2011.
- Hasan Prishtina vlerë sublime e kombit (Hasan Prishtina, Sublime Value of the Nation), Prishtinë, 2013. OCLC 878050331

== See also ==
- Drenica
- University of Pristina
