= Finiq =

Finiq Φοινίκη (Foiniki)
- Municipality
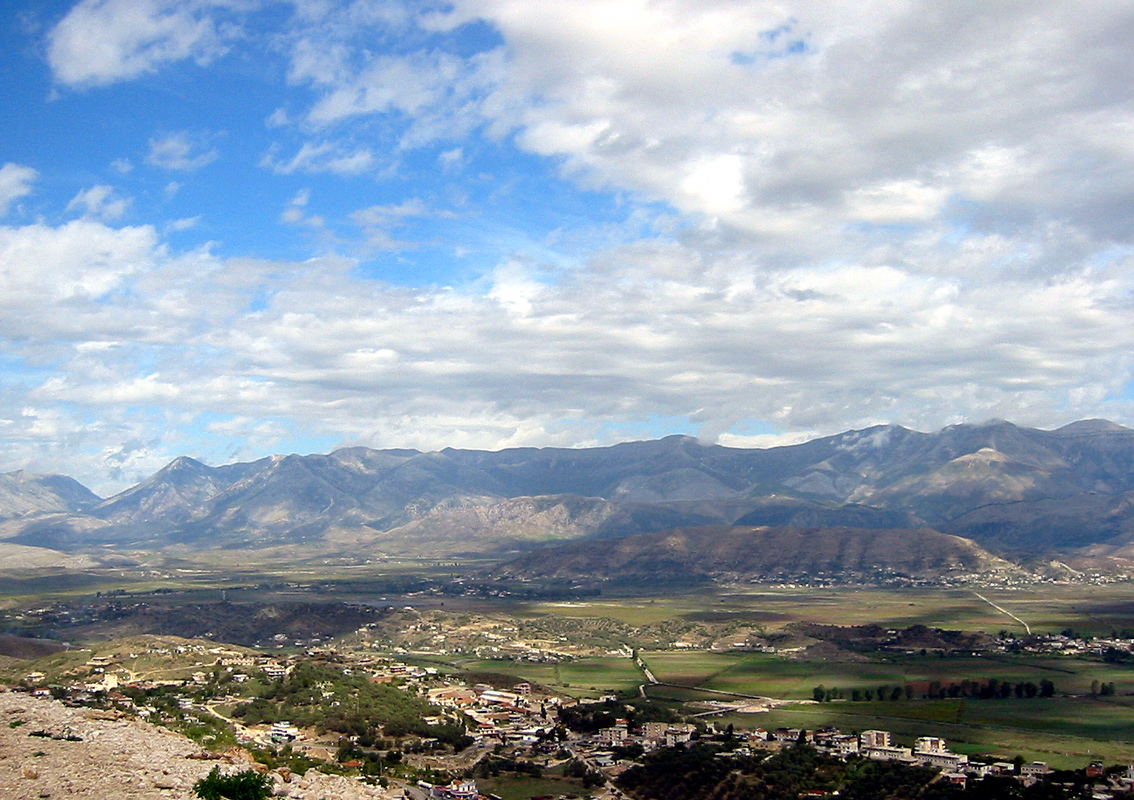
- The highlands of Delvinë and the hill of Finiq, ancient Phoinike, in the center of the picture behind the plains.

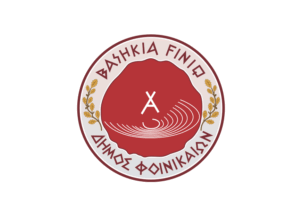
- Flag Emblem

- Location within Albania
- Coordinates: 39°54′N 20°3′E
- Country: Albania
- County: Vlorë

Government
  - Mayor: Romeo Çakuli (MEGA)

Area
  - Municipality: 444.28 km^{2} (171.54 sq mi)

Population (2011)
  - Municipality: 10,529
  - Municipality density: 23.699/km^{2} (61.380/sq mi)
  - Administrative unit: 1,333
- Time zone: UTC+1 (CET)
  - Summer (DST): UTC+2 (CEST)
- Postal Code: 9716
- Area Code: (0)895
- Website: bfiniq.gov.al

Finiq (Albanian: Finiq, Albanian definite form: Finiqi, Greek: Φοινίκη, romanized: Foiniki) is a settlement, considered a town or village, and municipality in Vlorë County, in southern Albania located 8 km from the Ionian Sea and 20 km north of the Greek border. It was formed at the 2015 local government reform by the merger of the former communes Aliko, Dhivër, Livadhja, Mesopotam, and Finiq itself. It is inhabited by ethnic Greeks and is one of two municipalities in Albania in which Greeks form a majority, alongside Dropull. The seat of the municipality is the village Dërmish. The total population is 10,529 (2011 census), in a total area of 444.28 km^{2}.

The population of the former municipality at the 2011 census was 1,333; according to the civil offices, which count all citizens including those who live abroad, was 6,780 (2011 estimate).

== Name ==
The ancient name of the Greek toponym (Greek: Φοινίκη) was not preserved through literary revival. As such, the modern settlement retained in the Ottoman register of 1431 its name Finiki.

== History ==
In antiquity, Phoenice was the political center of the Epirot Greek tribe of the Chaonians. Early Byzantine architecture (4th-7th century) is evident in the settlement, in particular that of the three aisled basilica type.

The settlement retained its ancient name and is mentioned in an Ottoman record of 1431 as Finiki. According to the Chronicle of Gjirokastër the first years of Ottoman rule (15th century) were peaceful but after the Fall of Constantinople (1453) Finiki (that time known as Phinikoupolis) was destroyed by the Muslims. At the end of the 16th century Finiki witnessed a drastic population increase and became one of the largest settlements in the area with 359 households (compared to contemporary Gjirokastër with 302 and Delvinë with only 204 taxable households).

By 1870, a secondary Greek language school was already operating in Finiq.

== Demographics ==
=== Ottoman registries ===
In the Defter of the Sanjak of Delvinë from 1431-1432, 4 villages in the area of Vurgu are recorded: Finiki (Finiqi), Vurgo, Jeromi and Krajna (Kranéja) each with very few inhabitants. Among these villages, the Ottoman register of 1520 attests typical Albanian names are attested inscribed such as: Gjin, Reçi,Leka,Gjon, Dorza, Meksh Nika and Deda.

The Ottoman defter of 1582 for the Sanjak of Delvina provides records for the village of Finiq. A significant portion of the anthroponyms recorded in the register belonged to the Albanian onomastic sphere, including personal names such as Bos, Dedë, Dodë, Gjergj, Gjin, Gjokë, Gjon, Lalë, Lekë, Muzhak, and others. However, more ambiguous or general Christian anthroponyms that were historically used by both Albanian and non-Albanian groups are also attested. In Finiq, a quarter of the population recorded bore purely Albanian anthroponyms. These figures do not take into account kinship ties shared between individuals bearing typical Albanian anthroponymy and those bearing more ambiguous names, and also do not include those bearing names that can be etymologically explained through Albanian (e.g., Buzmiri, Bala, Bardhi, Burriqi, Buzuku, Çobani, Dera, Iriqi, Kuka,Marsi, Mara, Macja, Poçi, Plaku, Uk, Ylli). As such the ethnic Albanian element must have represented a larger proportion.

=== 19th century ===
Athanasios Psalidas (1767–1829), counselor of Ali Pasha of Ioannina noted that the town was inhabited by an ethnic Greek community.

=== Modern demographics ===
The 2015 Albanian civil registry, which counts all citizens including those who live abroad, recorded a much higher municipal population of 39,055. The municipal unit of Finiq comprises the villages Finiq, Buronjë (Mavropull), Çlirim, Vrion, Karahaxhë and Bregas (Vromero).

The town of Finiq and all the villages of the municipality are exclusively inhabited by Greeks, except the village of Çlirim, which is mixed.

According to the ministry of foreign affairs of Albania, the Greek population of Finiq is 5,531, making Greeks a majority. Greek is used for some official purposes, and toponyms and street addresses are written in both Albanian and Greek in official documents.

== Municipal Council ==
Seat distribution in the Municipal Council

Following the 2023 local elections, the composition of the Council of Finiq is as follows:

Name	Abbr.	Seats
Socialist Party of Albania; Partia Socialiste e Shqipërisë	PS	7
Ethnic Greek Minority for the Future; Minoriteti Etnik Grek për të Ardhmen	MEGA	5
Together We Win; Bashkë Fitojmë	BF	5
Democratic Party of Albania; Partia Demokratike e Shqipërisë	LZHK	2
Social Democracy Party of Albania; Partia Demokracia Sociale e Shqipërisë	PDS	1
Social Democratic Party of Albania; Partia Socialdemokrate e Shqipërisë	PDS	1

== Notable people ==
- Irini Qirjako, Albanian singer and actress

== Sources ==
- Konstantinos, Giakoumis (2002), The monasteries of Jorgucat and Vanishte in Dropull and of Spelaio in Lunxheri as monuments and institutions during the Ottoman period in Albania (16th-19th centuries), University of Birmingham, archived from the original on 16 July 2020
