= Vlorë County =

County in southern Albania

Vlorë County Qarku i Vlorës (Albanian)
- County
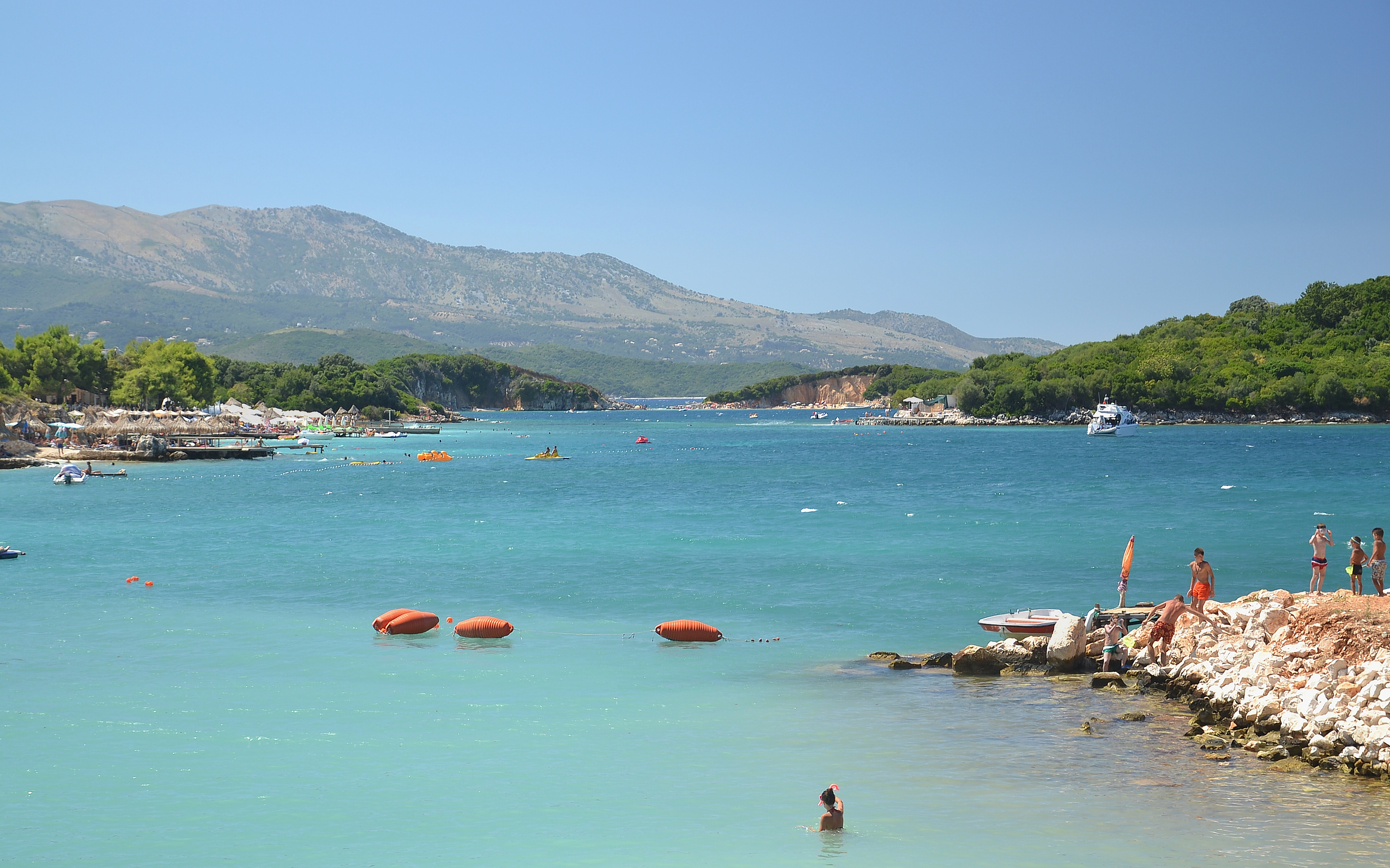
- Beaches at Ksamil

- Flag Emblem

- Coordinates: 41°N 20°E
- Country: Albania
- Seat: Vlorë
- Subdivisions: Seven municipalities, 197 towns and villages

Government
  - Council chairman: Ervis Moçka

Area
  - Total: 2,706 km^{2} (1,045 sq mi)
  - Rank: 5th

Population (2023)
  - Total: 146,681
  - Rank: 7th
  - Density: 54.21/km^{2} (140.4/sq mi)
- Time zone: UTC+1 (CET)
  - Summer (DST): UTC+2 (CEST)
- HDI (2023): 0.840 very high · 2nd
- NUTS Code: AL035
- Website: Official website

Vlorë County (Albanian pronunciation: [vlɔɽ(ə)]; Albanian: Qarku i Vlorës) is one of the 12 counties of Albania with the city of Vlorë being the county capital. The county spans 2,706 square kilometres (1,045 sq mi) and has a total population of 146,681 people as of 2023. It borders the counties of Fier and Gjirokastër, as well as the Adriatic and Ionian Sea. Greece borders Vlorë to the south.

Vlorë is geographically a very mountainous county. The county stretches along the Adriatic Sea and especially the Ionian Sea, forming the Albanian Riviera. The county has a coastline of 244 kilometres (152 mi). The coasts on the west can be very steep and rocky with green panoramic vistas and high mountains in the hinterland, including the Ceraunian Mountains. The highest natural point is Çikë, at 2,044 metres (6,706 ft). The northwest of the county is mostly located on the peninsula of Karaburun, with a rough relief, steep cliffs, bays and rocky beaches.

With about than 146,000 inhabitants in 2023, Vlorë is the seventh most populous county within Albania, and the third most populous within the Southern Region. Albanians constitute the ethnic majority of the county, including the capital. Greeks, Aromanians, and a few Roma also are present in the ethnic composition of the county.

The port city of Vlorë is the capital of Vlorë County. It is where the Albanian Declaration of Independence was proclaimed on November 28, 1912. Sarandë is one of the most important tourist attractions of the Albanian Riviera, situated on an open sea gulf of the Ionian Sea in the central Mediterranean, about 14 km (8.7 mi) east of the north end of the Greek island of Corfu. The Butrint National Park, Llogara National Park and Karaburun Sazan National Marine Park are located in Vlorë County. The ancient city of Butrint is an archeological site in Vlorë County, some 14 kilometres south of Sarandë. It is located on a hill overlooking the Vivari Channel and is part of the Butrint National Park.

== History ==
During Roman antiquity, the city of Vlorë, the homonymous county capital, was known as Aulón (Ancient Greek: Αυλών, Latin: Aulona, meaning channel or glen in Greek, and possibly a translation of another indigenous name). The city was mentioned for the first time by Ptolemy (2nd century CE) among the towns of the Illyrian Taulantii.

The coastal area of Vlorë was one of those Illyrian sites that had experienced pre-urban activity beginning from the 11th–10th centuries BCE. In classical antiquity the Bay of Vlorë constituted the southern limit of the Illyrian coast. The coastal area of the Bay was settled by Ancient Greek colonists, who traditionally founded Oricum, Thronion and Aulon. The latter city, however, dates to the Roman period. but a large fortified port-town that was inhabited from the 6th century BCE to the 2nd century AD is placed, now partially submerged, in Triport, northwest of present-day Vlorë. Illyrians were found in the hinterland of the Bay. The Ceraunian Mountains represented a natural border between Illyria and Epirus. The area to the south of the mountains was inhabited by the Epirote tribe of the Chaonians. On the Epirote coast the Ancient Greeks developed the town of Sarandë, which they referred to as Onchesmos (or Anchiasmos). Onchesmos flourished as the port of the Chaonian capital of Phoenice (modern-day Finiq). Another Chaonian settlement was Chimera, identified with Himarë,

In the Middle Ages, the region was part of the Byzantine Empire, while during the Slavic invasion there is evidence that Byzantine rule was maintained in the area.

In 1204 the region became part of the Despotate of Epirus, but later returned to the Byzantine Empire. In 1335 Albanian tribes were in possession of the area between Berat and the bay of Vlorë, while in 1345 after the Serbian invasion an independent principality was formed in Vlorë.

In the middle of the 14th century the aristocratic Delvina family ruled Delvinë, and in 1354 Mehmet Ali Pasha Delvina was testified as the owner of the castle and the city.

The Ottoman Empire captured the region in 1417, while in 1432, Albanian rebels freed Vlorë and expelled the Ottomans from the area. As part of the Ottoman Empire, The region became a sanjak centre in Rumelia Eyalet under the name Avlonya.

On November 28, 1912, Ismail Kemal declared the Albanian National Awakening in Vlorë, during the First Balkan War. The region became Albania's first freed region following its independence, but was invaded by Italy in december 1915, during World War I. The region remained occupied by Italian forces until an Albanian rebellion forced the Italians out of Albania in 1920. Italy invaded Vlorë again in 1939. The region remained under Italian occupation until Italy surrendered to the allies in 1943. Subsequently, Nazi Germany occupied the region until 1944. The city was liberated in 1944 by communist forces under Enver Hoxha.

During World War II, Sazan Island became the site of a German and Italian submarine base and naval installations; these installations were heavily bombed by the Allies.

After World War II, with Albania ruled by a Communist Party, the port was leased out to the Soviet Union for use as a submarine base. During 1960 and 1961 it served as a theater in the aftermath of the decision of Enver Hoxha to denounce Nikita Khrushchev's reforms. In April 1961 the Soviet Union, resenting being pushed out after considerable investment in the naval facilities at Pasha Liman Base, threatened to occupy the region with Soviet troops, and cut off all Soviet economic, military and technical aid to Albania.

== Geography ==
=== Location ===
Vlorë is one of the twelve counties of Albania located in the east, south and southwest of the Southern Region. The county lies between latitudes 41° N, and longitudes 20° E. It measures an area of 2,706 km^{2} (1,045 sq mi) placing it the fifth largest in Albania and the third largest in the Southern Region, behind Korçë County and Gjirokastër County. It is bordered by the counties of Fier to the north and Gjirokastër to the east, the country of Greece to the south and the Adriatic Sea in the northwest, as well as the Ionian Sea in the west.

The county of Vlorë is divided into seven municipalities; Delvinë, Finiq, Himarë, Konispol, Sarandë, Selenicë and Vlorë. The municipalities are further subdivided into 200 towns and villages in total.

In Vlorë, there are five islands, notably the Ksamil Islands. The combined areas of the four Ksamil islands measure only 7.1 hectares (17.5 acres), and forms part of the larger Butrint National Park.

Sazan Island is located strategically between the Strait of Otranto and the entrance to the Bay of Vlorë and has an area of 5.7 km^{2} (2.2 sq mi) with no civil population. In addition to being the largest island in Albania, it is a military facility and sometimes in clear weather it may be seen by eye from the coast of Salento, Italy. More than half of the island's surrounding marine area forms part of the Karaburun-Sazan National Marine Park. Stillo Island is rocky and sparsely vegetated. It has an area of half an hectare, with an approximate length of 80 meters and a width of 100 meters. It is located in the Ionian Sea, 200 meters off the coast of Cape Stillo. Tongo Island is a rocky island, its waters rich in aquatic life. The island is situated about 300 metres (984 feet) off the Greek coast. It has an area of 2.5 hectares (6.2 acres). The Zvërnec Islands are two islands located in Narta Lagoon. The larger island is nearly completely covered with tall pine trees and is connected to the mainland by a 270m long wooden bridge. It is 430 metres (1,410 ft) in length and 300 metres (980 ft) in width. It has an area of around 8.8 hectares (22 acres). The smaller island has a smaller vegetation, being 230 metres (750 ft) in length and 100 metres (330 ft) in width, with an area of little more than 1 hectare (2.5 acres).

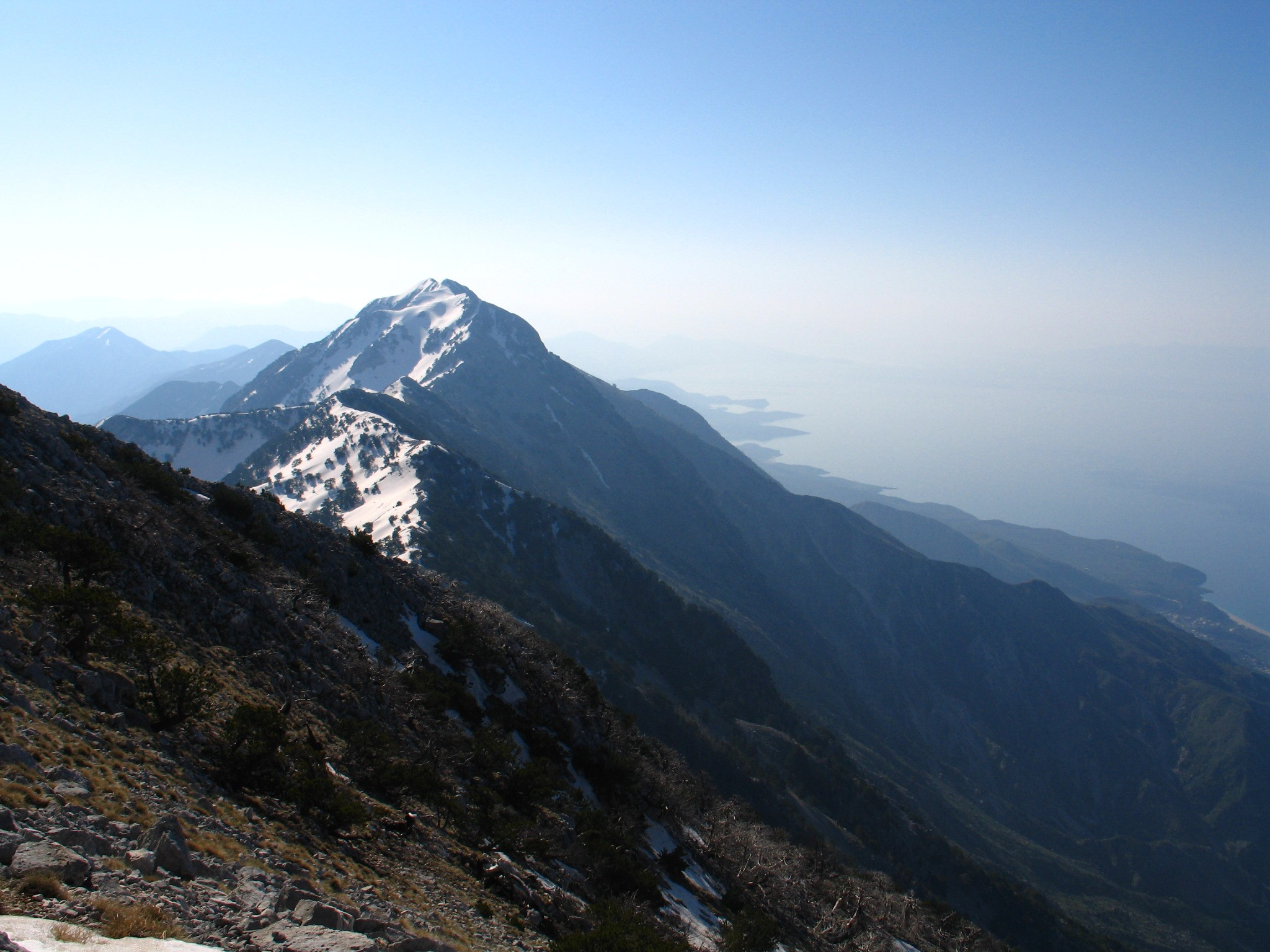
The Ceraunian Mountains lie along the Albanian Riviera with Maja e Çikës being the highest point.

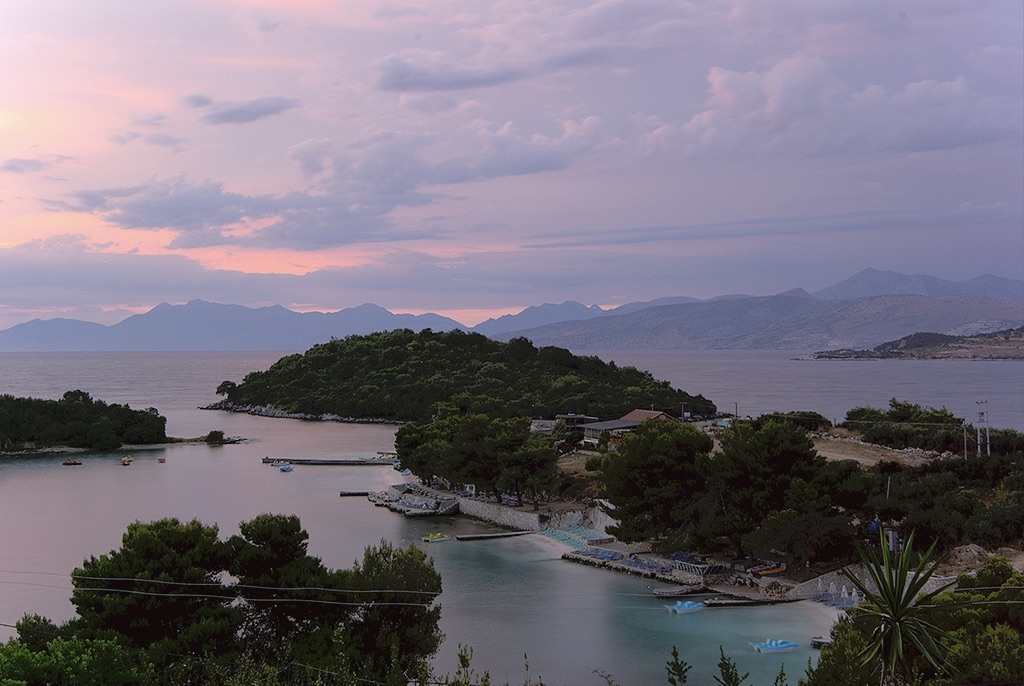
The four islands of Ksamil in the south.

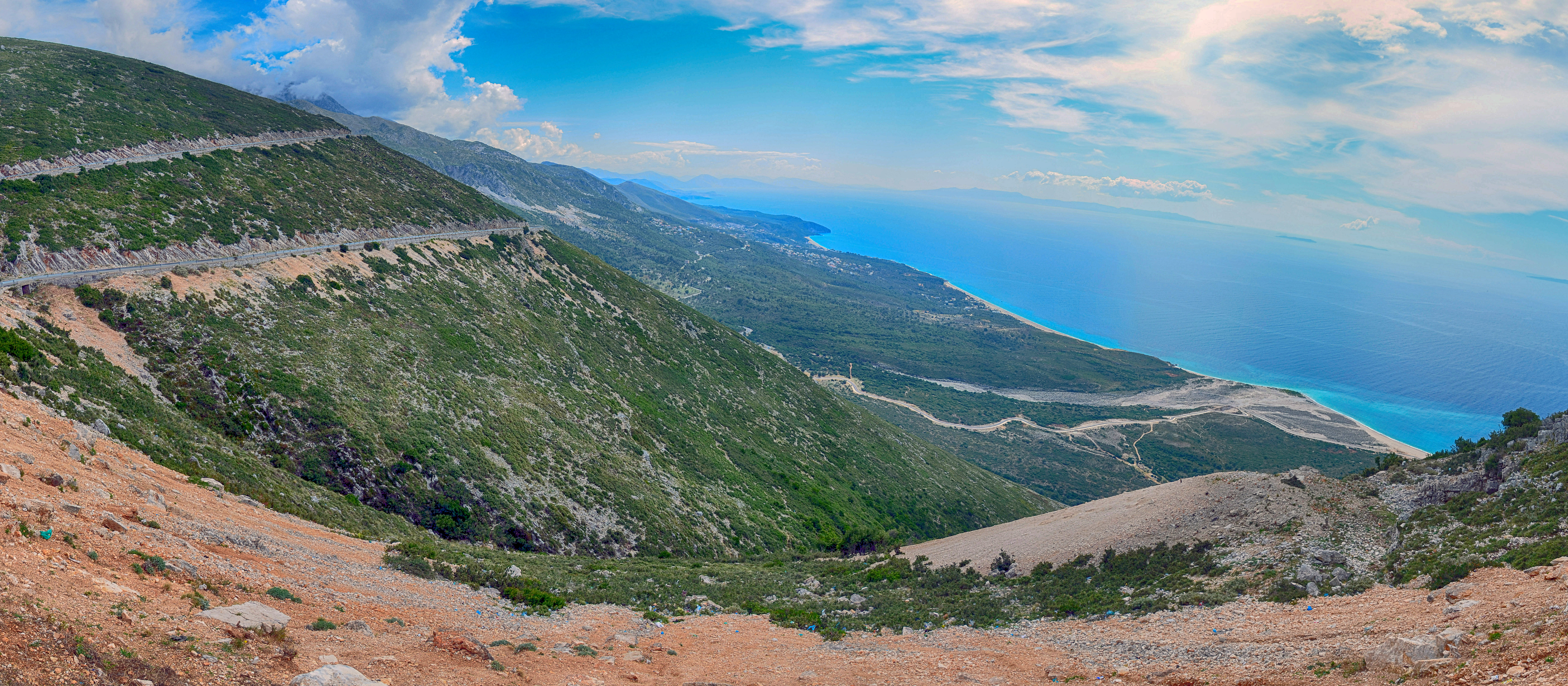
The Llogara Pass divides the Ceraunian Mountains into a western and an eastern range.

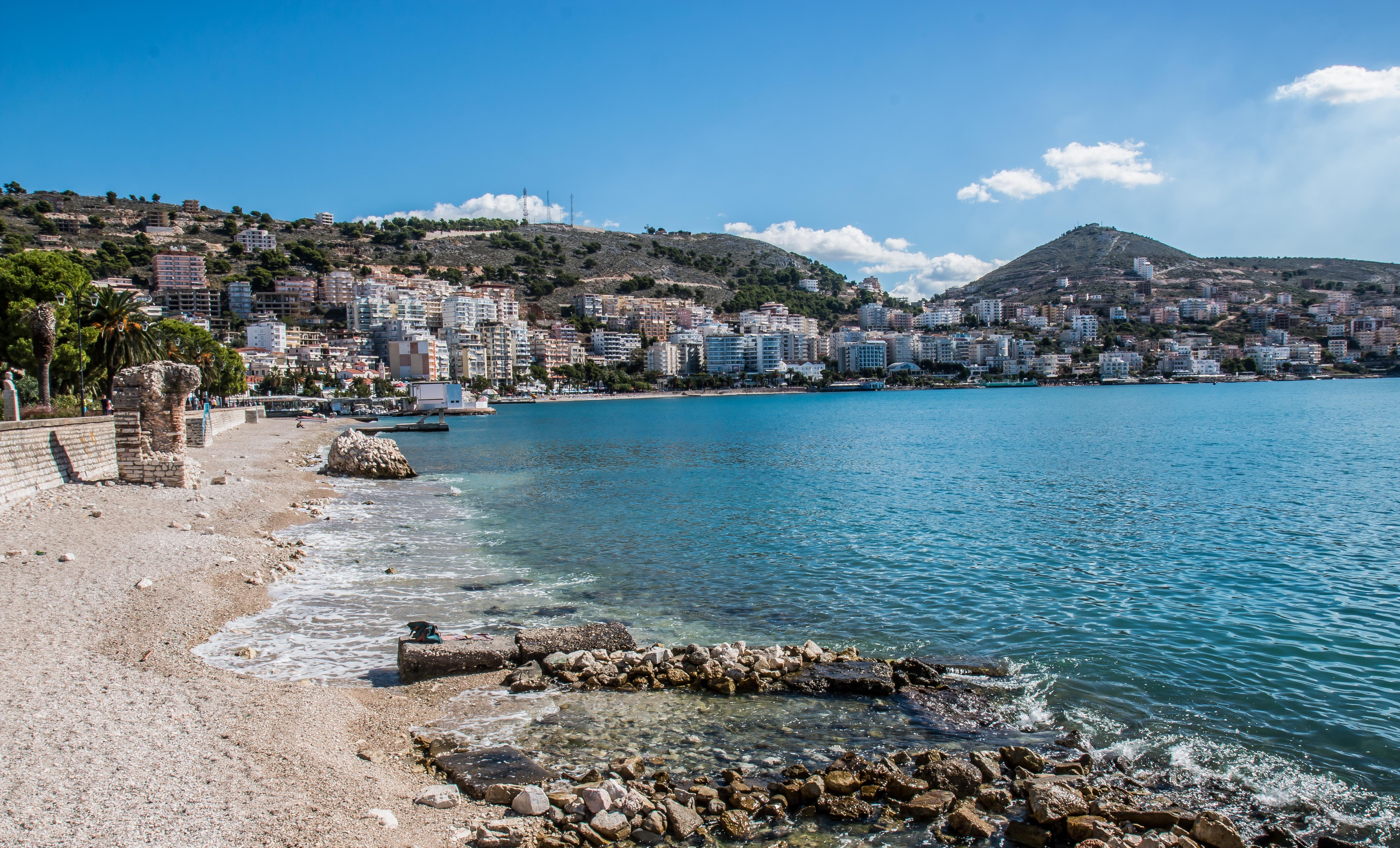
Sarandë is the southernmost most populous city within the county.

=== Biodiversity ===
Phytogeographically, the county completely falls within the Illyrian deciduous forests terrestrial ecoregion of the Palearctic Mediterranean forests, woodlands, and scrub.

=== Protected areas ===
The county of Vlorë has many ecosystems. Within the county there are three national parks, namely Llogara National Park, Karaburun-Sazan Marine Park and Butrint National Park.

== Demographics ==
Historical population
Year	Pop.	±%
1950	113,007	—
1960	148,879	+31.7%
1969	183,367	+23.2%
1979	218,674	+19.3%
1989	264,556	+21.0%
2001	192,982	−27.1%
2011	175,640	−9.0%
2023	146,681	−16.5%

The population of Vlorë, as defined by the Institute of Statistics of Albania, was found in 2023 census to be 146,681. The province is 87.61% Albanian, 8.21% Greek, 0.33% Aromanian, 0.31% Romani, 0.96% Egyptian and 1.26% is not available.

=== Religion ===
According to the 2023 census, Vlorë has a diverse religious makeup, with notable populations of Muslims, Orthodox Christians, and non-religious individuals. With 57.3% of the population identifying with a religion, it stands out as the county with the lowest religious identification in Albania.

Between the 2011 and 2023 censuses in Vlorë, the religious landscape underwent significant changes. The share of the population identifying as Sunni Muslim declined notably, dropping from 42.1% to 31.9%, while Bektashi Muslims rose substantially from 1.1% to 6.3%. The proportion of Catholic Christians decreased from 1.9% to 1.1%, whereas Orthodox Christians saw an increase from 13.7% to 17.6%. Evangelical Christians also experienced modest growth, rising from 0.06% to 0.3%.

The irreligious population in Vlorë saw one of the most significant increases in the country. The share of atheists grew from 6.0% to 8.3%, and those identifying as believers without denomination rose markedly from 11.0% to 21.7%. With a combined 30.0% identifying as irreligious in 2023, Vlorë ranks first in Albania for the highest proportion of non-religious individuals. Meanwhile, the proportion of individuals in the "Not stated/other" category decreased from 24.0% to 12.5%.

Population of Vlorë according to religious group according to the (2011–2023)
Religion group	Census 2011		Census 2023		Difference (2023−2011)	
Religion group	Number	Percentage	Number	Percentage	Number	Percentage points change
Sunni Muslim	74,013	42.1%	46,841	31.9%	-27,172	-10.2%
Bektashi Muslim	1,903	1.1%	9,263	6.3%	+7,360	+5.2%
Total Muslim	75,916	43.2%	56,104	38.2%	-19,812	-5.0%
Catholic Christian	3,369	1.9%	1,649	1.1%	-1,720	-0.8%
Orthodox Christian	24,125	13.7%	25,756	17.6%	+1,631	+3.9%
Evangelical	109	0.06%	445	0.3%	+336	+0.24%
Total Christian	27,603	15.7%	27,850	19.0%	+247	+3.3%
Atheists	10,563	6.0%	12,174	8.3%	+1,611	+2.3%
Believers without religion/denomination	19,267	11.0%	31,873	21.7%	+12,606	+10.7%
Total Non-religious	29,830	17.0%	44,047	30.0%	+14,217	+13.0%
Not stated / other	42,105	24.0%	18,330	12.5%	-23,775	-11.5%
TOTAL	175,640	100%	146,681	100%	-28,959	-

The most densely populated areas are the coastal cities of Vlorë, Sarandë and Himarë, while vast regions, such as the highlands, are very sparsely populated.

== Economy ==
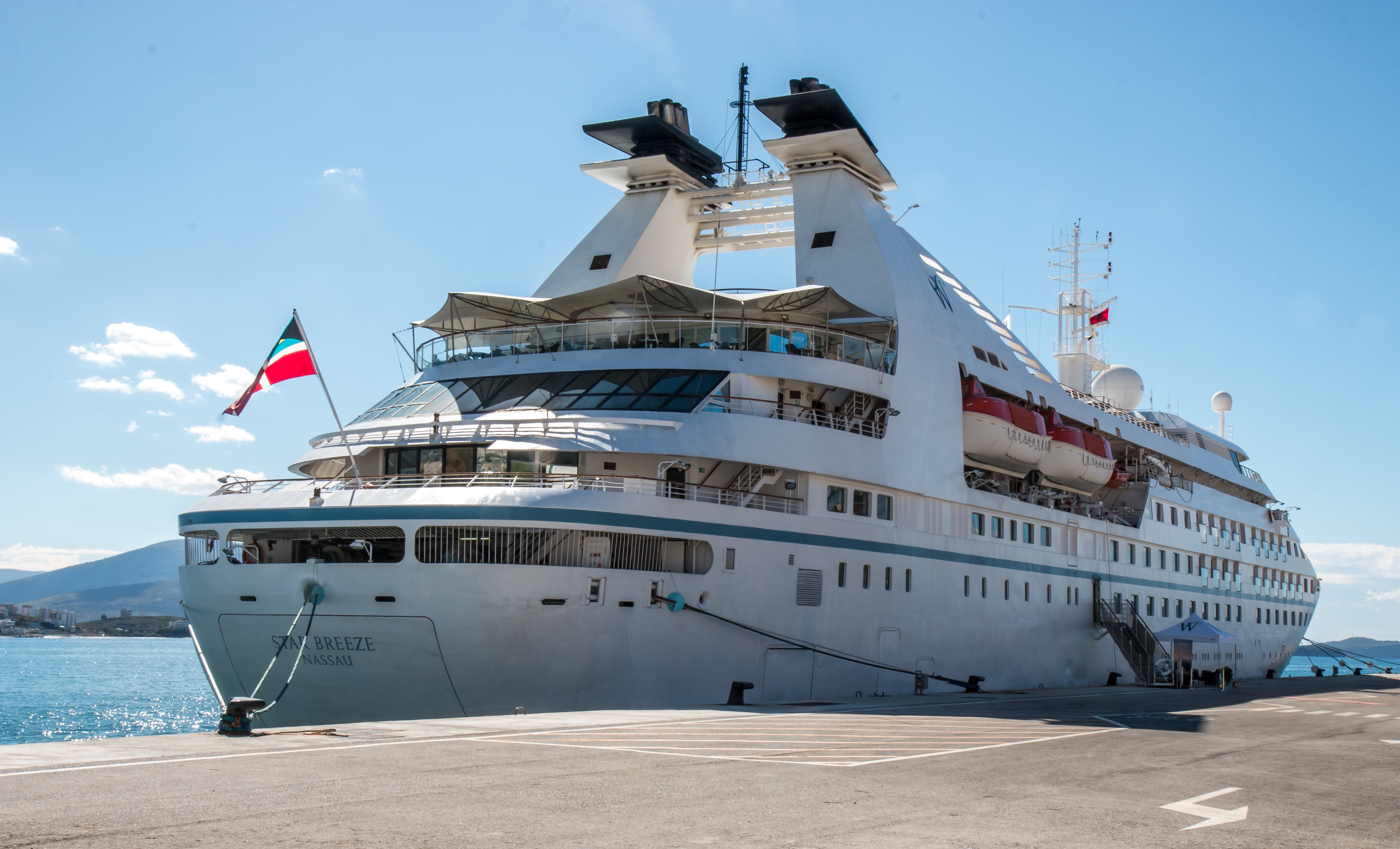
Cruise tourism is an important segment of the tourism sector in Sarandë.

Vlorë County has the second highest human development after Tirana County, and has a High Human Development Rating within Albania.

The county remains a major seaport and commercial centre, with a significant fishing and industrial sector. The city of Vlorë is the economic hub of the county. The surrounding region of the city is mainly agricultural and pastoral; a large producer of petroleum, natural gas, bitumen and salt. Vlorë has grown in importance as an agricultural center with large-scale planting of olive and citrus fruit trees, and as a center of the food processing, oil and bitumen export industries.

According to the World Bank, Vlorë has made significant steps in the ease of starting a business in 2016. It ranks seventh among 22 cities in Southeastern Europe, being placed higher than the capital Tirana, Belgrade and Sarajevo.

Tourism has become a major industry in recent years, with many hotels, recreational centers, and vast beaches. In Sarandë, tourism is the main driver of the economy. It is a significant tourist destination on the Ionian Sea, and by far one of the most popular destinations in Albania. Vlorë County is considered a prosperous region, one with varied attractions, plants and mountains, rivers and lakes, springs and virgin beaches, citrus plantations, olive groves and vineyards, pastures and woods, fish and shellfish farming and desirable hunting places.

In short, Vlorë County's location is advantageous in terms of development of tourism. Sarandë's stony beaches are respectable, and there are plenty of sights in and around town, including the ancient archaeological site of Butrint and the hypnotic Blue Eye Spring.

== See also ==
- Geography of Albania
- Divisions of Albania
- Politics of Albania

== Bibliography ==
- Bejko, Lorenc; Morris, Sarah; Papadopoulos, John; Schepartz, Lynne (2015). The Excavation of the Prehistoric Burial Tumulus at Lofkend, Albania. ISD LLC. ISBN 978-1938770524.
- Bereti, Vasil (1993). "Gjurmë të fortifikimeve në vendbanimin në Treport / Traces de fortifications dans l'habitat à Treport". Iliria. 23: 143–159. doi:10.3406/iliri.1993.1622.
- Bereti, Vasil; Quantin, François; Cabanes, Pierre (2011). "Histoire et épigraphie dans la région de Vlora (Albanie)". REA. 113 (1).
- Cabanes, Pierre (2008). "Greek Colonisation in the Adriatic". In Tsetskhladze, Gocha R. (ed.). Greek Colonisation: An Account of Greek Colonies and Other Settlements Overseas. Vol. 2. Brill. pp. 155–186. ISBN 9789047442448.
- Chisholm, Hugh, ed. (1911). "Avlona" . Encyclopædia Britannica (11th ed.). Cambridge University Press.
- De Simone, Carlo (2017). "Illyrian". In Klein, Jared; Joseph, Brian; Fritz, Matthias (eds.). Handbook of Comparative and Historical Indo-European Linguistics. Vol. 3. Walter de Gruyter. pp. 1867–1872. ISBN 978-3-11-054243-1.
- Fasolo, Michele (2005) [2003]. La via Egnatia I. Da Apollonia e Dyrrachium ad Herakleia Lynkestidos. Viae Publicae Romanae (in Italian). Vol. 1. Rome: Istituto Grafico Editoriale Romano.
- Hammond, N. G. L.; Wilkes, J. J. (2012). "Illyrii". In Hornblower, Simon; Spawforth, Antony; Eidinow, Esther (eds.). The Oxford Classical Dictionary. OUP Oxford. p. 726. ISBN 978-0-19-954556-8.
- Malkin, Irad (2001). "Greek Ambiguities: Between "Ancient Hellas" and "Barbarian Epirus"". In Malkin, Irad (ed.). Ancient Perceptions of Greek Ethnicity. Center for Hellenic Studies colloquia. Vol. 5. Center for Hellenic Studies, Trustees for Harvard University. pp. 187–212. ISBN 978-0-674-00662-1.
- Papadopoulos, John (2016). "Komai, Colonies and Cities in Epirus and Southern Albania: The Failure of the Polis and the Rise of Urbanism on the Fringes of the Greek World". In Molloy, Barry P.C. (ed.). Of Odysseys and Oddities: Scales and Modes of Interaction Between Prehistoric Aegean Societies and their Neighbours. Oxbow Books. pp. 435–460. ISBN 978-1-78570-232-7.
- Shpuza, Saimir (2022). "D'un limên à une polis. Orikos aux périodes archaïque et classique". In Brancato, Rodolfo (ed.). Schemata: la città oltre la forma : per una nuova definizione dei paesaggi urbani e delle loro funzioni: urbanizzazione e società nel Mediterraneo pre-classico : età arcaica. Edizioni Quasar. ISBN 9788854912755.
- Volpe, Giuliano; Disantarosa, Giacomo; Leone, Danilo; Turchiano, Maria (2014). "Porti, approdi e itinerari dell'Albania meridionale dall'Antichità al Medioevo. Il 'Progetto Liburna'". Ricerche Archeologiche in Albania. Aracne: 287–326. doi:10.4399/978885487245516 (inactive 12 July 2025). ISBN 978-88-548-7245-5.
- Zindel, Christian; Lippert, Andreas; Lahi, Bashkim; Kiel, Machiel (2018). Albanien: Ein Archäologie- und Kunstführer von der Steinzeit bis ins 19. Jahrhundert (in German). Vandenhoeck & Ruprecht. ISBN 9783205200109.
