= Dropull i Sipërm =

Dropull i Sipërm Άνω Δρόπολη
- Administrative unit
- Location within Albania
- Coordinates: 39°55′N 20°18′E
- Country: Albania
- County: Gjirokastër
- Municipality: Dropull

Population (2011)
  - Administrative unit: 971
- Time zone: UTC+1 (CET)
  - Summer (DST): UTC+2 (CEST)

Dropull i Sipërm (Greek: Άνω Δρόπολη, Ano Dropoli) is a former municipality in the Gjirokastër County, southern Albania. At the 2015 local government reform it became a subdivision of the municipality Dropull. The population at the 2011 census was 971. The municipal unit is inhabited by ethnic Greeks.

== Settlements ==
- Bodrishtë
- Bularat
- Dritë
- Jorgucat
- Kërrë
- Klishar
- Kakavijë
- Koshovicë
- Krioner
- Likomil
- Llongo
- Llovinë
- Pepel
- Selo
- Sotirë
- Vodhinë
- Vrisera
- Zervat

== See also ==
- Dropull
- Dropull i Poshtëm
- Greeks in Albania
