= Dropull i Poshtëm =

Dropull i Poshtëm Κάτω Δρόπολη
- Administrative unit
- Location within Albania
- Coordinates: 40°1′N 20°11′E
- Country: Albania
- County: Gjirokastër
- Municipality: Dropull

Population (2011)
  - Administrative unit: 2,100
- Time zone: UTC+1 (CET)
  - Summer (DST): UTC+2 (CEST)

Dropull i Poshtëm (Greek: Κάτω Δρόπολη, Kato Dropoli) is a former municipality in the Gjirokastër County, southern Albania. At the 2015 local government reform it became a subdivision of the municipality Dropull. The population at the 2011 census was 2,100. The municipal unit is inhabited by ethnic Greeks.

== History ==
In spring 1833, Albanian rebels led by Tafil Buzi, Zenel Gjoleka and Çelo Picari clashed with Ottoman troops near Peshkëpi.

== Settlements ==
- Derviçan (Δερβιτσάνη)
- Dhuvjan (Δούβιανη)
- Frashtan (Φράστανη)
- Glinë (Γλύνα)
- Goranxi (Καλογοραντζή or Γοραντζή)
- Goricë (Γορίτσα)
- Grapsh (Γράψη)
- Haskovë (Χάσκοβο)
- Lugar (Λιούγκαρη)
- Peshkëpi e Sipërme (Άνω Επισκοπή)
- Peshkëpi e Poshtme (Κάτω Επισκοπή)
- Radat (Ραντάτι)
- Sofratikë (Σωφράτικα)
- Terihat (Τεριαχάτι or Τεριαχάτες)
- Vanistër (Βάνιστα)
- Vrahogoranxi (Βραχογοραντζή)

== Notable people ==
- Vasilios Sahinis (1897–1943), leader of the Northern Epirote resistance (1942–1943).

== See also ==
- Dropull
- Dropull i Sipërm
- Greeks in Albania
