= Ilongo =

Ilongo may refer to:

- Ilongo people, an ethnic group of Mindanao and the Visayas, the Philippines
  - Ilongo language, their Austronesian language
- Ilongo Ngasanya, Congolese football player

== See also ==
- Ilongot (disambiguation)
- Llongo, a village in Albania
