= Fredis Beleris =

Greek politician (born 1972)

Fredis Beleris MEP
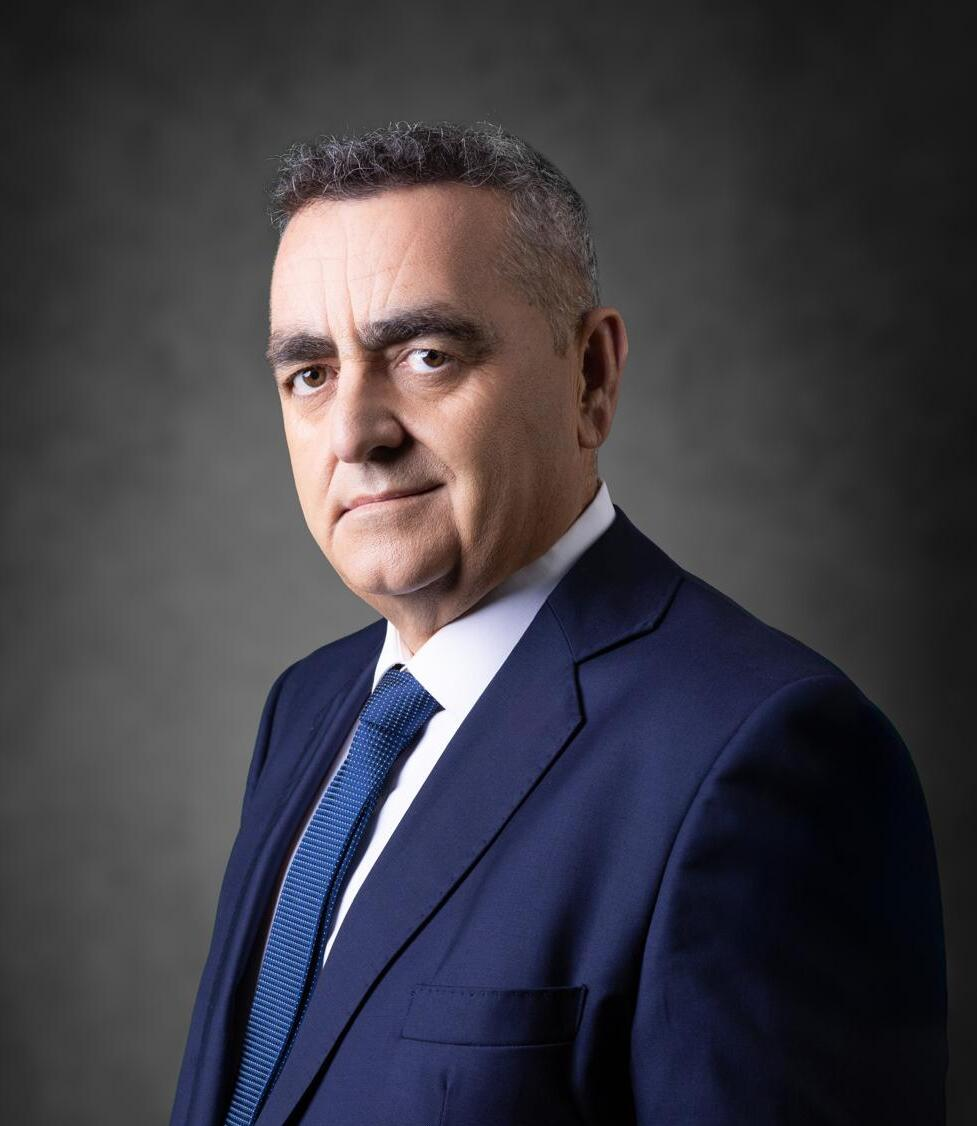

Member of the European Parliament
- Incumbent
- Assumed office 16 July 2024
- Constituency: Greece

Personal details
- Born: 9 August 1972 (age 54) Himarë, Vlorë County, Albania
- Citizenship: Albania; Greece
- Party: New Democracy (Greece)
- Other political affiliations: Unity for Human Rights Party (Albania); Together We Win (Albania)
- Children: 2
- Education: Panteion University
- Website: https://beleris.com

Dionysios-Fredis Beleris (Greek: Διονύσιος-Φρέντης Μπελέρης; Albanian: Dhionisios Alfred "Fredi" Beleri; born 9 August 1972) is an ethnically Greek politician from Albania who was elected mayor of Himarë. Beleris was elected mayor in the 2023 local elections as candidate of the Together We Win political coalition, an office he did not take after being arrested a few days earlier for vote buying. His arrest mobilized both the Greek community in Albania and the Greek government, which accused the Albanian authorities of attempting to hinder the political activities of Albania's Greek minority. In the trial that followed, he was sentenced to two years in prison; as a result of the conviction, Albania's Central Electoral Commission declared Beleris's mandate invalid, and decided to hold new elections. He was released on 3 September 2024, having served 2/3 of his sentence.

While in prison, Beleris was elected as MEP of the New Democracy party, in the 2024 European Parliament election in Greece.

== Biography ==
Beleris was born in 1972, in Himarë, Albania as Dhionisios Alfred Beleri. At the end of 1990, with the collapse of the regime in Albania and the opening of the borders, he settled in Greece. He was baptised as an Orthodox Christian in Zakynthos, and took the name Dionysios. His political activity began there when he was elected as a member of the "Board of Directors of the Peloponnese and Ionian Himariotes". In the first semester of 1994 he went to Cyprus where he attended seminars on the Greek language and on thermohydraulic installations, organised by the "Pancyprian Forum for the Aid of Northern Epirus".

He then settled in Athens, where he worked as a plumber and was a member of the "Himariotic Association and the Youth of Northern Epirus". In 2005, he started his studies at the Panteion University of Athens, department of International and European Studies. In the period 2006–2008, he was the General Secretary of the "Association of Himariots", while in the period 2008–2011 he was its president, where he worked for the protection of the rights of Hellenism in Himarë. Since 2009, he has been a member of the General Council of Omonia, while in August 2014 he was elected president of the "Omonoia Himara Branch".

In 2015, he settled permanently in Himarë, where he operates a bar restaurant. In February 2015, he was elected vice president of the General Council of Omonoia.

Beleris has dual citizenship, Albanian and Greek. He is married and has two children.

=== MAVI involvement ===
On 10 April 1994, an armed group attacked the Albanian army's recruit training centre in the village of Peshkëpi, Dropull, 4 km from the Greek-Albanian border. The gunmen shot and killed the guard. They invaded the ward where the recruits slept and killed the commander-captain, seriously wounded three soldiers and lightly wounded several others. Then locked 130 soldiers in a room, removed part of the camp's weaponry (Kalashnikov rifles and Tokarev pistols), and drove away towards Epirus.

On 6 October 1994, the organization "Mavi" (Northern Epirus Liberation Front), in a proclamation in the newspaper Eleftherotypia, claimed responsibility for the deadly attack in Peshkëpi.

On 18 March 1995, the Greek authorities arrested near Delvinaki seven passengers of two cars, including Beleris, after finding in the cars' trunks nine Kalashnikov automatic weapons, two pistols, bayonets, camouflage, radio, and hoods. The Kathimerini journalist Stavros Tzimas in his book Στον αστερισμό του εθνικισμού said: "There was no doubt that the arrested men were planning to attack a military target, which was the Llongo camp, a short distance from the border. It was also revealed that it was roughly the same group, or at least some of its members, that had struck in Peshkëpi."

Beleris and other arrested faced charges for misdemeanors and, after their appeal, they were tried behind closed doors and were handed sentences of imprisonment for 18 up to 20 months for illegally owning guns.

Nine years after the incident, the Police of Gjirokastër tried to reopen the investigations, but even at that time they did not have the support of the Greek authorities to provide information about Beleris and his associates. Investigations opened again in 2019 by the Prosecutor's Office for Serious Crimes who asked the Court of the Judicial District of Tirana to forward the documents of the case. But the file of the 1994 event had disappeared. Investigations were closed in 2021 due to lack of evidence.

He has been identified as the MAVI member who under the nickname "Fanis", discussed with journalist Stavros Tzimas his participation in the MAVI-related Episkopi and Longos incidents; as well as the group's 2001 terrorist attack with a hand grenade in Peristeri, Athens, against Greeks of Albania cooperating with the Albanian state, which included Vangjel Tavo.

== Political career ==
Acquitted of the charges, Beleris gradually pursued a political career, which was occasionally linked to the far right. In October 1997, he attended an event organized by Makis Voridis's Hellenic Front party. He also appeared on a show hosted by the leader of the Golden Dawn party Nikos Michaloliakos, and at events organised by the far-right Popular Orthodox Rally party of Giorgos Karatzaferis.

In July 2006, Beleris, along with some other Greeks in Himarë, were ultimately sentenced to three years in prison by an Albanian court, for insulting the symbols of the Albanian Republic and inciting ethnic hatred during the 2003 local elections. According to the indictment, Beleris and others in the evening of 12 October 2003, the day of the elections, following reports of irregularities, protested in front of the local election commission, carrying Greek flags and shouting pro-Greek slogans, demonstrating their support for one of the candidates. He did not serve his sentence as he fled the country. He returned in 2011 when the sentence was cancelled due to the statute of limitations. However, when he wanted to run for mayor of Himarra in the 2019 local elections, the electoral commission disqualified him because according to Albanian law, a person convicted of any sentence cannot hold any public office until 10 years after the expiry of his sentence.

Beleris and his co-defendants appealed to the European Court of Human Rights against Albania for violation of their right to freedom of expression, as guaranteed by the Albanian Constitution. The court declared the application inadmissible.

=== 2023 Albanian local elections, arrest, trial and conviction ===
Beleris run again for the municipality of Himarë, in the 2023 local elections, as a candidate of the centre-right political coalition Together We Win, led by Ilir Meta and Sali Berisha. However, on 12 May, two days before the elections, he was arrested by police at his restaurant on charges of "corruption in elections". Individuals from Himarë and Dhërmi had testified to the police that Beleris had offered them 100,000 lek for their vote. According to the police, Beleris had been under surveillance for some time and was arrested in the act during a transaction.

Beleris denied all charges, pleading not guilty and claiming that he was the victim of a politically motivated frame-up. The Albanian Prime Minister Edi Rama, in a TV interview two days before Beleris's arrest, openly accused him of attempting to manipulate votes and intimidate Albanians living in Greece to vote for him in the elections. In the same interview, he referred to him with derogatory terms, accusing him of being functionally illiterate, chauvinist, and dangerous for the Albanian state, since he had publicly promised to hellenize Himarë if elected. According to the Greek journalist Stavros Tzimas, the Albanian Prime Minister personally led the attempt to discredit Beleris politically and morally, with the aim of destroying his candidacy in the elections and not to allow a Greek mayor to take over the leadership of this critical municipality; both from a geostrategic, and from a touristic or economic point of view.

Nevertheless, Beleris was elected mayor of Himarë; albeit with a small margin. In particular, he won with 50.12% against a 49.88% of Jorgo Goro, in an election that managed to attract only 34% of the Himariotes.

Himarë Mayoral Election, 14 May 2023
Candidate	Party	Votes	Percentage	Result	Notes
Fredis Beleris	Unity for Human Rights Party	3,840	50.12%	Elected (not sworn in)	Mandate later invalidated after conviction for vote-buying.
Jorgo Goro	Independent / Socialist Party-supported	3,821	49.88%	Not elected	

The Albanian courts rejected the requests of his lawyers to release him, albeit with restrictions, as he had a criminal record that justified his detention. Beleris was also not allowed to take the mayor's oath or to attend the first meeting of the city council, so the administration of the municipality continued by the defeated Jorge Goro, who served as an acting mayor. On 23 March 2024, the Albanian authorities arrested Jorgo Goro for abuse of office. The arrest came after allegations made by the imprisoned Beleris in the fall of 2023, that he facilitated the sale of beachfront properties so that certain individuals could benefit from "strategic investor" status.

Beleris was eventually convicted on 5 March 2024 to two years in prison, which he challenged without success. The trial was highly publicized mainly because of the reactions by the Greek government, which from the beginning of the proceedings fully supported Beleris. In fact, minister Makis Voridis said that Greece would veto Albania's EU accession path because of Beleris's conviction. The Greek government believes that there were many serious irregularities in the trial, resulting in the loss of objectivity in the judgement.

On 25 June 2024, Albania's "Court of Appeals of the Special Structure Against Corruption and Organised Crime" confirmed the verdict of Beleris's sentencing; as a result of the conviction, Albania's Central Electoral Commission revoked the mandate of Beleris, and decided to hold new elections. Finally, and after he had served 2/3 of his sentence, he was released on parole on 2 September 2024.

=== Member of the European Parliament ===
After repeated meetings and discussions, the Prime Minister of Greece and leader of the New Democracy party, Kyriakos Mitsotakis, chose to place Beleris on the party's ballot for the European elections of June 2024. According to journalists, the political aims of this choice were first and foremost to regroup right-wing voters, who according to polls were turning to the smaller right-wing and far-right parties; please his party's base, who overwhelmingly supported Beleris's candidacy; and garner the attraction of the Greeks of Albania, and those who are particularly sensitive to foreign policy issues.

Beleris was elected to the European Parliament with 236,367 votes; fourth out of the nine MEPs of New Democracy.

European Parliament Election, 9 June 2024 (Greece)
Candidate	Party	Votes	Result	Notes
Fredis Beleris	New Democracy (Greece)	236,271	Elected (4th among ND candidates)	Elected while in pre-trial detention.

Following the Court of Appeal's decision not to reduce his sentence, which meant that Beleris would remain in prison until around October 2024, problems arose regarding his participation in the European Parliament. In particular, he was not expected to exercise his duties as an MEP as although MEPs enjoy immunity, this only applies to EU Member States. Politico reported that: "Officials from New Democracy, who spoke on the condition of anonymity because they were not authorized to speak publicly, admit there is currently no way for him to perform all of his political duties."

In June 2024, Beleris was listed among the 23 most eccentric new MEPs in the European Parliament by Politico Europe; along with Afroditi Latinopoulou and Galato Alexandraki.

==== Opinions about his candidacy ====
Loukas Tsoukalis, professor at Sciences Po in Paris, said:

The decision to nominate Belleris had to weigh the electoral gain for the ruling party and the support for patriotic right-wing action within the New Democracy party on the one hand, against relations with Albania and the majority of Greece's European partners on the other. The decision taken by the Greek prime minister shows that the scales have finally tipped in favour of the first one.

Dimitris Christopoulos, associate professor at Panteion University, noted that Beleris would not have become a candidate if he was not imprisoned, and that "the 'Belerization' of Greek-Albanian relations is primarily Athens' initiative"; he also described Himara as a battleground of Albanian and Greek nationalism.

According to Panajot Barka, a historian of the Eqrem Çabej University of Gjirokastër and a journalist of the Greek minority in Albania, whose personal stance on that issue cost him his job in the Athens News Agency, believes that the selection of Beleris will further complicate relations between Greece, Albania and the EU. He added: "Beleri with three criminal convictions, two for ethnic issues on both sides of the border and one now for electoral corruption, creates a handicap or a stalemate, not easily overcome."
