= Frashtan =

Frashtan Φράστανη
- Village
- Location within Albania
- Coordinates: 39°58′N 20°14′E
- Country: Albania
- County: Gjirokastër
- Municipality: Dropull
- Administrative unit: Dropull i Poshtëm
- Time zone: UTC+1 (CET)
  - Summer (DST): UTC+2 (CEST)

Frashtan (Albanian definite form: Frashtani; Greek: Φράστανη) is a settlement in the former Dropull i Poshtëm municipality, Gjirokastër County, southern Albania. At the 2015 local government reform it became part of the municipality Dropull. It is within the larger Dropull region.

The settlement lies at the foot of Mali i Gjerë (Greek: Πλατυβουνίου, romanized: Platyvouniou) and is bordered to the south by Lugar and to the north by Goricë. East of the village is Glinë.

== Demographics ==
In the Ottoman register of 1520 for the Sanjak of Avlona, the village was attested as a timar under the authority of Ali, the son of Mehmed. The village had a total of 95 households and the anthroponymy attested almost entirely belonged to the Albanian onomastic sphere, characterised by personal names such as Bardh, Deda, Gjin, Gjon, Kola, Leka and others. The village also had one Muslim household, that of Haxhi Ibrahi, whose land was in the possession of a certain Çoban Ali.

In the late Ottoman period, Frashtan was an Albanian-speaking village.

The village is inhabited by Greeks, and the population was 505 in 1992.

Many of the inhabitants of Frashtan migrated to nearby Greece following the fall of communism in Albania.

== Gallery ==
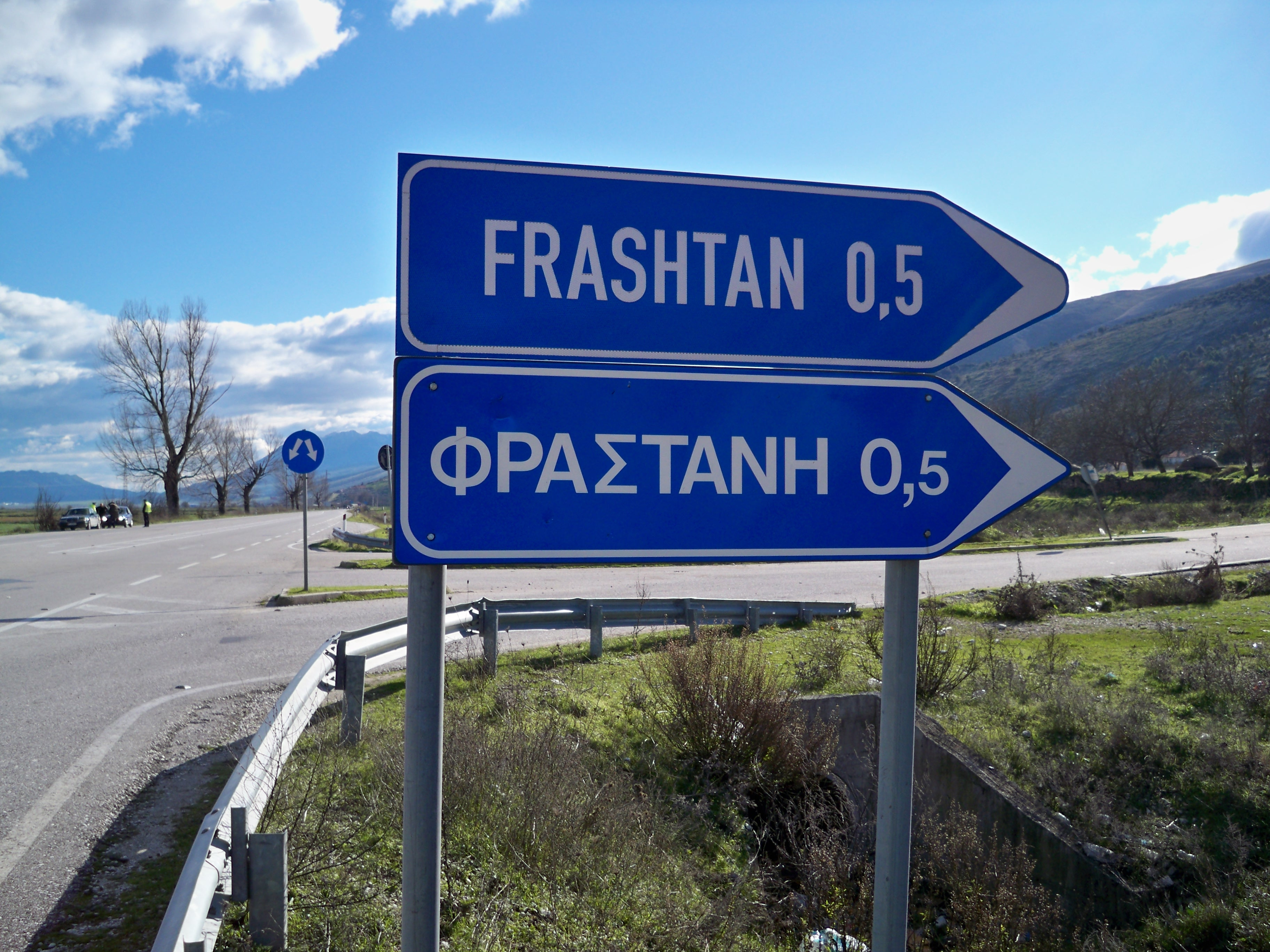
Frashtan Road Sign
