= Jorgucat =

Jorgucat Γεωργουτσάτες
- Village
- Location within Albania
- Coordinates: 39°56′07″N 20°15′49″E
- Country: Albania
- County: Gjirokastër
- Municipality: Dropull
- Elevation: 290 m (950 ft)
- Time zone: UTC+1 (CET)
  - Summer (DST): UTC+2 (CEST)

Jorgucat (Albanian definite form: Jorgucati; Greek: Γεωργουτσάτι/Γεωργουτσάτες, romanized: Georgoutsáti/Georgoutsátes) is a village in Gjirokastër County, southern Albania. At the 2015 local government reform it became part of the municipality of Dropull.

== Demographics ==
In the Ottoman register of 1520 for the Sanjak of Avlona, Jorgucat (Gjerkucat) was attested a village in the timar under the authority of Ali from Damas. The village had a total of 71 households. The anthroponymy attested largely belonged to the Albanian onomastic sphere, characterised by personal names such as Bardh, Deda, Gjin, Laluç, Gurmir, Gjon, Kola, Leka and others.

According to Ottoman statistics, Jorgucat had 449 inhabitants in 1895. The village is inhabited by Greeks, and the population was 1,015 in 1992.

== Location ==
The village Jorgucat is one of the main settlements in the southern part of Dropull valley. It's located between the villages of Zervat to the south and Grapsh to the north. Jorgucat is situated at a cross-road which joins Ioannina, Gjirokastër and Sarandë.

== Name ==
The village received its name Jorgucat (Georgoutsates) as the result of the conversion of a surname to a toponym. In particurlar the name Georgoutsates applies to the descendants of a certain Georgoutsos.

== History ==
According to a local tradition Jorgucat was once called Gonates, a village mentioned in the Chronicle of Gjirokastër during the reign of Byzantine Emperor Alexios Komnenos (11th century). However, this theory remains disputed. Other accounts claim that the foundation of the settlement dates back to the first years of Ottoman rule (15th century). The village under its current name is recorded in an Ottoman document of 1520. That year it consisted of 62 households.

Jorgucat suffered dramatic population decline from the 17th to the first half of the 19th century.

During 2014–2015 the village witnessed various instances of vandalism by Albanian nationalist element; such as the looting of the Hellenistic era tombs and the vandalism of the church of Saint George.

== Monastery of Prophet Elias ==
The Monastery of the Prophet Elias next to the village is situated on a natural elevation in the mountain range of Mali i Gjerë named Hilomodhi, on the Marantoraq peak. According to a local tradition the monastery was founded in the 12th century, supposedly built by giants. Documentary and architectural evidence, however, supports that the year of its foundation was 1545. The monastery was repaired and enlarged several times between the 17th and 19th centuries. In the 20th century it was closed down by the authorities of the Albanian state.

== Notable individuals ==
- Kosmas Thesprotos (c. 1780 – 1852), Greek scholar, priest and theologian
- Vangjel Tavo (b. 1969), politician who was elected mayor of Himarë in 2024

== Sources ==
- Giakoumis, Konstantinos (2002). "The Monasteries of Jorgucat and Vanishtë in Dropull and of Spelaio in Lunxhëri as Monuments and Institutions During the Ottoman Period in Albania (16th-19th Centuries)". ResearchGate. University of Birmingham.*
