= St. Mary's Church on Drianos =

Cultural monument of Albania

- Kisha e Shën Mërisë në Drianos (Albanian)
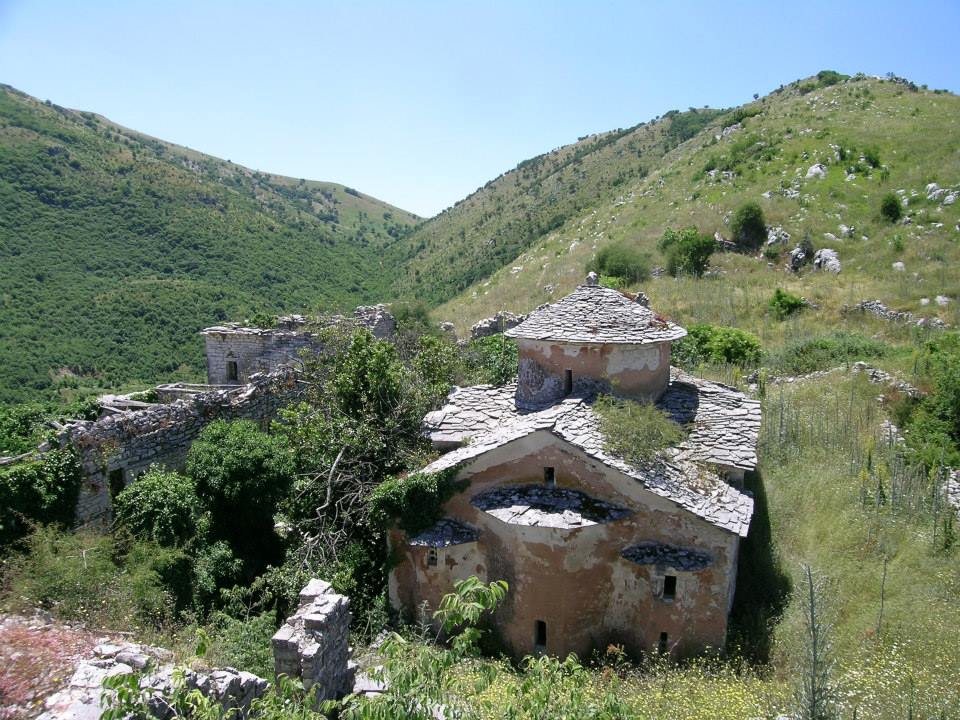
- Interactive map of St. Mary's Church on Drianos
- 39.9074°N 20.2533°E
- Location: Zervat

Cultural Monument of Albania

St. Mary's Church on Drianos (Albanian: Kisha e Shën Mërisë në Drianos) is a church on the mountain Drianos, near the village Zervat, Gjirokastër County, Albania. It is a Cultural Monument of Albania.
