= St. Mary's Monastery =

St. Mary's Monastery may refer to:

- St. Mary's Monastery, Kakome, Albania
- St. Mary's Monastery, Goranxi, Albania
- St. Mary's Monastery (Zvërnec)
- St. Mary of the Angels Church and Monastery, Green Bay, Wisconsin

== See also ==
- St. Mary's Monastery Church (disambiguation)
