= Northern Epirus Liberation Front =

Ethnic Greek resistance group in southern Albania

- Μέτωπο Απελευθέρωσης Βορείου Ηπείρου
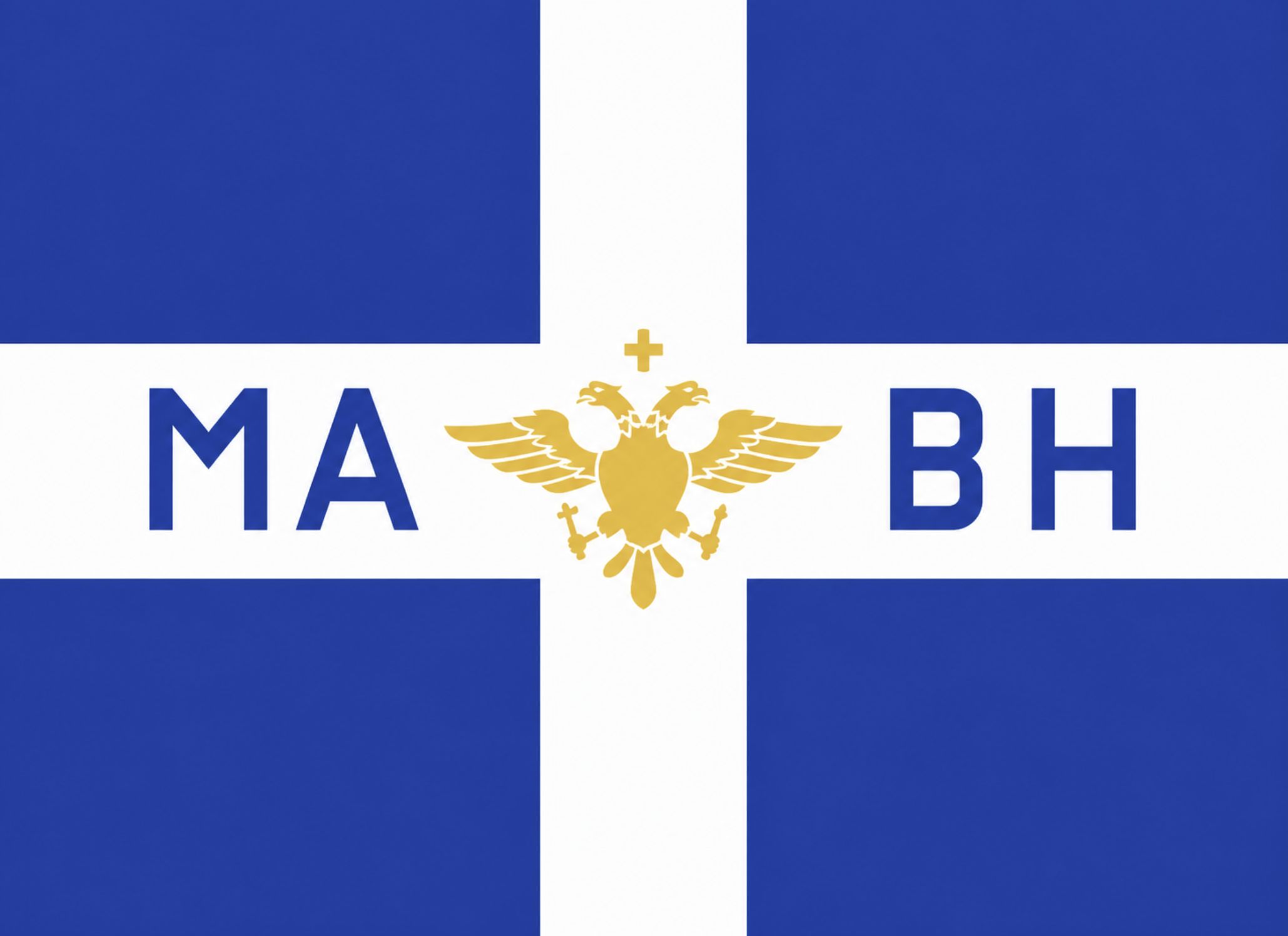
- Leader: Vasileios Sachinis
- Dates active: 1942–1944
- Active regions: South Albania (Delvinë,Pogon, Lunxhëri, Zagorie, Himara, Vlorë, Përmet, Leskovik, Dropull etc.)
- Ideology: Greek resistance
- Size: about 1500
- Wars: World War II

The Northern Epirus Liberation Front (Greek: Μέτωπο Απελευθέρωσης Βορείου Ηπείρου (ΜΑΒΗ), Métopo Apelefthérosis Voreíou Ipeírou (MAVI)), also called the Northern Epirote Liberation Organization (Εθνική Απελευθερωτική Οργάνωση Βορειοηπειρωτών (ΕΑΟΒΗ), Ethnikí Apeleftherotikí Orgánosi Voreioipeirotón (EAOVI)), was an ethnic Greek resistance group that operated in areas of southern Albania during the Italian and German occupation of Albania (1942–1944). The group operated after the withdrawal of the Greek forces from the area (April 1941), against the invading Italians, Germans and both against the Albanian communist and collaborationist organizations.

== History ==
In May 1942, the first Northern Epirote resistance groups appeared in the area of Delvinë led by two locals and former officers of the Greek army: Spyridon Lytos and Ioannis Videlis. Soon several resistance groups were formed by the local Greek population all over southern Albania. They were operating in the regions: Pogon, Lunxhëri, Zagorie, Riza, Himara, Vlorë, Përmet, Leskovik and Korçë. In June 1942 these groups were organized under one leadership and the MAVI (also called EAOVI) was formed. The leading spirit was Vasileios Sachinis, a native from Douvian (Dropull).

=== Italian occupation ===
Widespread action was taken by the Northern Epirote resistance in December 1942, when attacks on Italian controlled frontier posts and gendarmerie stations increased. In the regions of Zagorie, Pogon, Delvinë, Sarandë (Vourkos) and Rhize sectors guerilla activity by MAVI was increasing. That period the leaders of the organization received a British mission in the village of Polican.

As a result of that activity Italian occupation forces took action, operating with units of the Albanian fascist militia. In March 1943, 160 inhabitants of Korce were sent to concentration camps for suspected underground activities with the Northern Epirote resistance. Moreover, with the help of Balli Kombëtar bands, occupation forces outlined plans against villages and towns of Epirote sympathies, in order to demoralize them.

The British Mission proposed that MAVI and the Albanian communist party, LNC, should collaborate to form a stronger force against the Axis and Albanian collaborationists (Balli Kombëtar), and arranged several meetings near Gyrokaster in August–September 1943.

On 8 August, representatives of the Northern Epirote resistance, decided to join the communist party only in specific attacks against the Axis, provided that the latter will recognize the autonomy of the region in the post-war period. Although the Albanian communist leaders agreed and assurances of the British allied mission were given, they secretly marked Vasilis Sahinis for liquidation.

While MAVI units continued their armed resistance struggle alongside the Greek nationalist army EDES, the Greek communist EAM and the Albanian communist LNC ultimately signed the Konispol Agreement, jointly resolving to dissolve and liquidate the nationalist factions operating within the border region.

=== German occupation ===
In September 1943 Italy surrendered to the Allies and its place in Albania was taken by German troops. Epirote groups were able to take the initiative for a short-time period.

During the period before Italy's surrender until the communist party prevailed (1943–1944) vicious fighting occurred between MAVI and combined armed groups of Germans and Albanian nationalists of Balli Kombëtar (Ballists) The results were devastating, many Ballist's bands looted and burned villages in their paths, shooting the inhabitants by firing squads, despite gender or age, burning the houses, some of which were locked with their occupants inside and hanging the village priests. In some occasions the operations were observed by German officers. In Moscopole the historic monastery of Saint John Baptist was destroyed as a result of these actions as well as in Bilisht and Leskovik the Balist bands of Safet Butka (an upper rank Ballist) resulted in heavy destruction and executions.

Vasilios Sachinis also protested to the Italian Occupation Forces, accusing them that they supported various activities of the Albanian resistance groups against the local Greek population. He became finally targeted by Albanian communists. There are conflicting accounts regarding the exact date and circumstances of his death. While some sources state that Sachinis was assassinated on 17 November 1943, when the Albanian communists raided Gjirokastër, other historical records state he was assassinated following severe torture earlier on 18 January 1943.

Following the departure of the Italo–German forces, Napoleon Zervas intended to liberate Northern Epirus as well, and for this reason, he maintained active contact with MAVI as a primary Northern Epirote liberation organization.

In February 1944, the regions that were under the control of the Northern Epirote resistance were taken over by the Partisans of FNC. The last recorded action was during October 1944, when an Epirote band ambushed German troops and captured their officers. However, due to diplomatic failure of the British mission and unprovoked actions of the communist resistance (of Enver Hoxha), MAVI was doomed.

== Aftermath ==
In Axis-supported Balli Kombëtar attacks and crimes against villages and towns, over 2,000 Greeks were killed, 5,000 imprisoned, and 2,000 taken hostages to concentration camps. Moreover, 15,000 homes, schools and churches were destroyed.

== Attacks in 80s and 90s ==
In 1983, a car bomb destroyed a car for the Albanian ambassador in Greece (but no one was injured), and on 10 April 1994, when two Albanian officers were killed in a border post on the Greek–Albanian border, responsibility was claimed by a far-right paramilitary organization which had the same name. Days later, the Albanian authorities arrested six ethnic Greek militants on charges of promoting separatism and suspect ties with the Greek Intelligence services. On 18 March 1995, the Greek authorities arrested near Delvinaki seven passengers of two cars, including Fredis Beleris, after finding in the cars' trunks nine Kalashnikov automatic weapons, two pistols, bayonets, camouflage, radio, and hoods. The Kathimerini journalist Stavros Tzimas in his book Στον αστερισμό του εθνικισμού said: "There was no doubt that the arrested men were planning to attack a military target, which was the Llongo camp, a short distance from the border. It was also revealed that it was roughly the same group, or at least some of its members, that had struck in Peshkëpi." The group of ethnic Greek expatriates (omogeneis) and a few mainland Greeks subsequently faced domestic legal prosecution in Greece. This judicial process and its ultimate legal outcome, along with the broader implications of the border incident, later became the subject of official legislative review during a Greek Parliamentary Assembly session in June 1995.

However, there is no clear link between the two organizations. According to press reports the World War II resistance organization, probably disbanded during the 1940s. The group claims responsibility for a car bombing in the Albanian embassy in Attica, Greece, which left no victims.

== Sources ==
- Pearson, Owen (2006). Albania in Occupation and War: From Fascism To Communism 1940–1945. I.B.Tauris. p. 512. ISBN 978-1-84511-104-5.
- Ruches, Pyrrhus J. (1965). Albania's captives. Chicago: Argonaut. p. 213.
