= Holy Trinity monastery =

Holy Trinity monastery is the title of several Christian monasteries, including (sorted by the country):

- Holy Trinity Monastery Church, Pepel, Albania
- Etropole Monastery of the Holy Trinity (AKA Varovitets), near Etropole, Bulgaria
- Patriarchal Monastery of the Holy Trinity, a monastery near Veliko Tarnovo, Bulgaria
- Lintula Holy Trinity Convent, Finland
- Monastery of the Holy Trinity, Meteora, Greece
- Holy Trinity Abbey, Lough Key, Ireland
- Church and monastery of the Holy Trinity, Vilnius, Lithuania
- Monastery of the Holy Trinity of Pljevlja, Montenegro
- Holy Trinity Monastery (Strâmba), Romania
- Saharna Monastery of the Holy Trinity, Romania
- Trinity-St. Sergius Lavra, about 90 km north-east of Moscow, Russia
- Monastery of the Holy Trinity, Kikinda, Serbia
- Holy Trinity Monastery (Jordanville, New York), United States
- Holy Trinity Monastery, East Hendred, a monastery of nuns in Oxfordshire, United Kingdom
- Abraham's Oak Holy Trinity Monastery, West Bank

== See also ==
- Trinity Monastery (disambiguation)
- Holy Trinity Church (disambiguation)
