= Dhuvjan =

Dhuvjan Δούβιανη
- Village
- Location within Albania
- Coordinates: 39°59′50″N 20°11′52″E
- Country: Albania
- County: Gjirokastër
- Municipality: Dropull
- Administrative unit: Dropull i Poshtëm
- Time zone: UTC+1 (CET)
  - Summer (DST): UTC+2 (CEST)

Dhuvjan (Albanian definite form: Dhuvjani; Greek: Δούβιανη, Douviani) is a settlement in the former Dropull i Poshtëm municipality, Gjirokastër County, southern Albania. At the 2015 local government reform it became part of the municipality Dropull. It is within the larger Dropull region.

== Name ==
The toponym Dhuvjan is either from a resident name Жув, Zhuv from a Bulgarian dialectal word жув, zhuv meaning 'living' and the suffix яне, yane. Or from дуб, dub, rendered in Old Slavic as джбъ, meaning 'oak' and the suffix яне, yane with the Greek or Albanian sound change d into dh, and the Greek sound change b into v.

== Demographics ==
In the Ottoman register of 1520 for the Sanjak of Avlona, Dhuvjan was attested as a village in the timar under the authority of Hasan and Ibrahim, the sons of Mahmud, who possessed and worked it jointly. The village had a total of 92 households. The anthroponymy attested largely belonged to the Albanian onomastic sphere, characterised by personal names such as Bardh, Deda, Gjin, Laluç, Gurmir, Gjon, Kola, Leka and others. According to Ferit Duka, the lack of names ending with -s implies a lack of Greek names. According to Doris Kyriazis, Ferit Duka's interpretation of the absence of the suffix -s in the names as an argument for the lack of the Greek element is wrong, because this was quite typical in Ottoman records on areas that were undoubtedly Greek-speaking. Another discrepancy, according to Kyriazis, was that Duka ignored the etymology of the local topology and the presence of archaic Greek place names that the Slavs had translated into their own language.

The village is inhabited by Greeks, and the population was 216 in 1992.

== Culture ==
=== Religion ===
The famous Dhuvjan Monastery, dedicated to Saints Quiricus and Julietta, as well as several smaller Eastern Orthodox churches are located in Dhuvjan.

=== Education ===
A Greek school was operating in the nearby Dhuvjan monastery from 1777. The first school in the village itself, a Greek elementary school, was operating at 1853, while a girls' school opened later at 1914.

== Notable people ==
- Grigorios Lambovitiadis (1908-1945), Greek revolutionist, activist of the Northern Epirus movement.
- Vasilios Sahinis (1897–1943), Greek revolutionist, leader of the Northern Epirote resistance (1942–1943).
- Tasos Vidouris (1888-1967), Greek poet
