= Peshkëpi incident =

- Location: Outpost near Peshkëpi, Dropull, Albania
- Date: 10 April 1994
- Target: Albanian border
- Attack type: Raid on an army recruit centre
- Deaths: 2 Albanian soldiers
- Injuries: 3 soldiers
- Perpetrator: Northern Epirus Liberation Front

The Peshkëpi incident was the killing of 2 Albanian army officers on 10 April 1994 at 02:40 AM. Eight men, later identified as members of the Northern Epirus Liberation Front, a Greek nationalist paramilitary organization, were involved in an attack on an Albanian army barracks in Peshkëpi, Dropull, Albania in April 1994. Two Albanian border soldiers were killed while sleeping; three were wounded.

== Background ==
From the mid-1980s, an ethnic Greek paramilitary organization named "Northern Epirus Liberation Front" (MAVI), after the Northern Epirote World War II organization, accused the Albanian Government of violating the rights of the ethnic Greek minority in Albania and berated Greece for not doing enough to support the minority. MAVI also called for an "armed struggle" against Albania. A 1983 bombing of the Albanian Embassy in Athens was claimed in its name.

On 10 April 1994, several gunmen crossed into Albania from Greece and stormed a border guard facility in the village of Peshkëpi, killing two soldiers and seriously wounding three others before returning across the Greek border.

== Aftermath ==
Albanian authorities alleged that the perpetrators were dressed in Greek military uniforms and were speaking Greek. In Greece, the Northern Epirus Liberation Front (MAVI) claimed responsibility both the next day and some months later. Stohos, a Greek nationalist weekly newspaper, regularly reported in a proud way about the incident. On the other hand, the Greek government flatly denied any responsibility in the event and, in the first couple of days, even excluded the possibility that any Greeks could have been involved in the incident. The Albanian government responded by arresting five member of the organization Omonoia.

In response to this arrest the Greek government expelled a high number (that goes from 70,000 to 125,000) of Albanians emigrants from Greece.

== Victims ==
Two Albanian soldiers were killed in their sleep, while 3 others were injured:

- Arsen Gjini (soldier)
- Fatmir Shehu (captain)

== See also ==
- Fredis Beleris

== Sources ==
- https://web.archive.org/web/20090316025705/http://www.greekhelsinki.gr/pdf/ghm-greeks-albanians.PDF
- http://b-info.com/places/Bulgaria/news/94-05/may13.gr
