= Vrahogoranxi =

Vrahogoranxi Βραχογορατζή
- Village
- Location within Albania
- Coordinates: 39.99013°N 20.2861°E
- Country: Albania
- County: Gjirokastër
- Municipality: Dropull
- Administrative unit: Dropull i Poshtëm
- Time zone: UTC+1 (CET)
  - Summer (DST): UTC+2 (CEST)

Vrahogoranxi (Greek: Βραχογορατζή) is a settlement in the former Dropull i Poshtëm municipality, Gjirokastër County, southern Albania. At the 2015 local government reform it became part of the municipality Dropull. It is within the larger Dropull region.

== Demographics ==
In the Ottoman register of 1520 for the Sanjak of Avlona, the village was attested in the district of Dropull. It had a total of 172 households and the anthroponymy attested almost entirely belonged to the Albanian onomastic sphere, characterised by personal names such as Bardh, Deda, Gjin, Gjon, Kola, Leka and others. The village also had 6 Muslim households.

The village is inhabited by Greeks and the population was 367 in 1992.
