= Kosmas Thesprotos =

Greek scholar, priest and theologian

Kosmas Thesprotos or Kosmas o Thesprotos (Greek: Κοσμάς ο Θεσπρωτός Kosmas the Thesprotian, 1780[;]–1852) was a Greek scholar, priest and theologian.

== Life ==
Kosmas was born as Kyritsis Kotras (Greek: Κυρίτσης (diminutive of Kyriakos) Κότρας) in the village of Jorgucat (Gr. Georgutsates, Γεωργουτσάτες), Dropull region in modern southern Albania, then Ottoman Empire. In 1805 he became a priest and changed his name to Kosmas. The following years he became a student of Athanasios Psalidas, a major figure of the modern Greek Enlightenment and graduated from the Kaplaneios School of Ioannina at 1815. He taught in several schools in Epirus region and after the successful Greek War of Independence (1821–1830) he moved to Athens were continued his educational activity. He died in Karpenisi, at 1852.

== Works ==
One of his famous works was the Γεωγραφία Αλβανίας και Ηπείρου (Geography of Albania and Epirus), based on the teachings of his teacher Psalidas. It was composed around 1833. It is a geographical treatise which describes geographically Albania and Epirus. Kosmas in this work adopted the notion of Psalidas that placed the geographical border between Epirus and Albania along the river Vjose (Aoos). This work was completed after his graduation from the Kaplaneios, when he worked as a teacher in various Greek schools in Epirus. He also wrote the following works:

- Γεωγραφία Αλβανίας και Ηπείρου (Geography of Albania and Epirus)
- Εγχειρίδιο φιλοσοφίας (Manual of Philosophy)
- Ποιημάτιον (Poem).
- Cosmas Thesprotos, La complainte d’Ali Pacha. Éd. critique avec trad. et glossaire par Yvon Tarabout. Publications Langues’O, Paris 1983.
