= Vodhinë =

Vodhinë Βοδίνο
- Village
- Location within Albania
- Coordinates: 39°53′30″N 20°19′17″E
- Country: Albania
- County: Gjirokastër
- Municipality: Dropull
- Elevation: 325 m (1,066 ft)
- Time zone: UTC+1 (CET)
  - Summer (DST): UTC+2 (CEST)

Vodhinë (Albanian definite form: Vodhina, Greek: Βοδίνο) is a village in Gjirokastër County, southern Albania. At the 2015 local government reform it became part of the municipality of Dropull.

== Name ==
The placename Vodhinë is derived from either the Bulgarian word вода, voda meaning 'water' and the suffix -ьн, -yn with the old reflex ь becoming i or from a personal name Водьо, Vodyo and the suffix ин, in. Through the Greek language the d sound in the toponym became dh.

== Demographics ==
The village is inhabited by Greeks and the population was 332 in 1992.
