= Hadrianopolis (Epirus) =

Town of ancient Epirus

Coordinates: 39°59′47″N 20°13′29″E

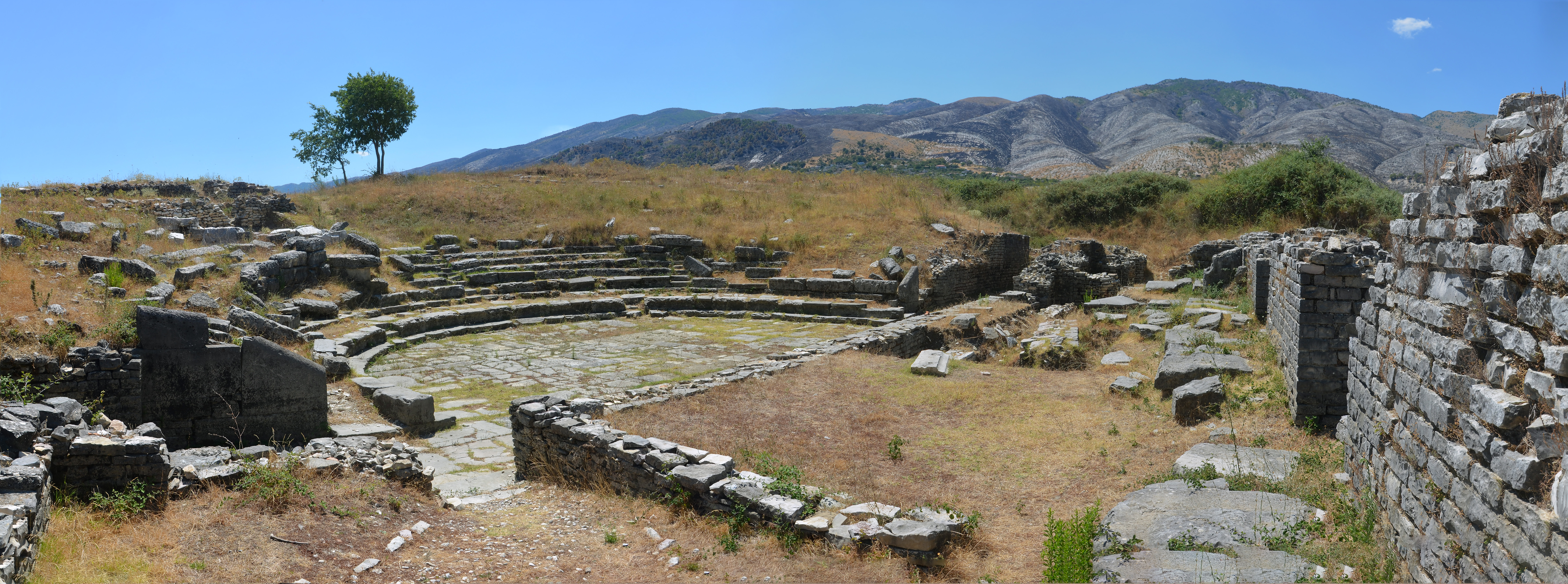
Theatre of Hadrianopolis

Hadrianopolis or Hadrianoupolis (Ancient Greek: Ἁδριανούπολις) was an ancient town in the valley of the river Drino, in the province of ancient Epirus and Illyricum. It is located near Sofratikë, Dropull, south of Gjirokaster, Albania.

It lies on the site of a Greek Classical and Hellenistic settlement from the late 5th century BC. Hellenistic settlements were concentrated on the hills for defense, and for strategically dominating the valley, such as the nearby city of Antigonia. They controlled access through the mountains and to the sea. In the Roman period, under more peaceful times, the settlement shifted to the valley and the town lay on an important road midway between Apollonia and Nicopolis.

The oldest buildings found are from the early Roman Imperial age; a small temple in opus quadratum and a circular structure later obliterated by the theatre. Under Hadrian (117–138 AD), the settlement was elevated to the status of city, becoming the capital and administrative centre of the region. It then reached its greatest expansion and monumentalisation with public buildings, including the theatre and baths. Organised on an orthogonal urban plan, the town occupies an area of 400 m by 300–350 m.

The theatre's cavea of 58 m in diameter was built on a large artificial embankment with vaults of opus caementicium. During the 4th century AD it was restored and reorganised to host venationes (hunts of wild animals) and perhaps gladiator fights. The theatre's cavea still stands to a height of several metres.

The baths visible today of the 3rd century AD replaced the previous Hadrianic complex with a smaller version. A necropolis has been found to extend over a significant area beyond the urban limits.

After a period of crisis from the beginning of the 4th and until the end of the 5th century AD, the town was restored by Justinian I and called Justinianopolis. It became the see of a bishop. During this period, a small church was built inside the theatre, houses and shops occupied the area of the baths, and the small ancient temple was demolished and embedded in a complex of buildings, perhaps with a residential function.

As early as the 7th century AD the city was abandoned but the name of Drynopolis and its bishopric continued to be attested throughout the Byzantine and medieval periods.

About twelve miles down river are the ruins of a fortress or small town of the Byzantine age, called Dryinopolis. The probability is that when Hadrianopolis fell into ruins, Dryinopolis was built on a different site and became the see of the bishop. Hadrianopolis remains a titular see of the Roman Catholic Church.

== Excavations ==
Excavations have been carried out for more than a decade, by a team from Macerata University, the Albanian Archaeological Institute, and Oxford University.

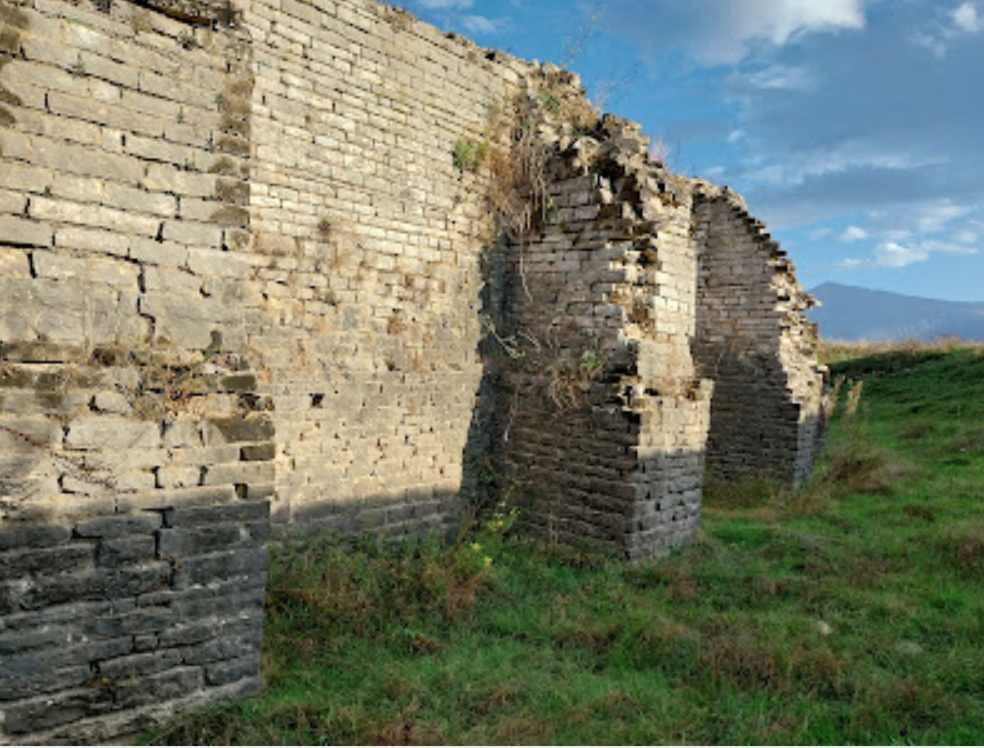
Theatre

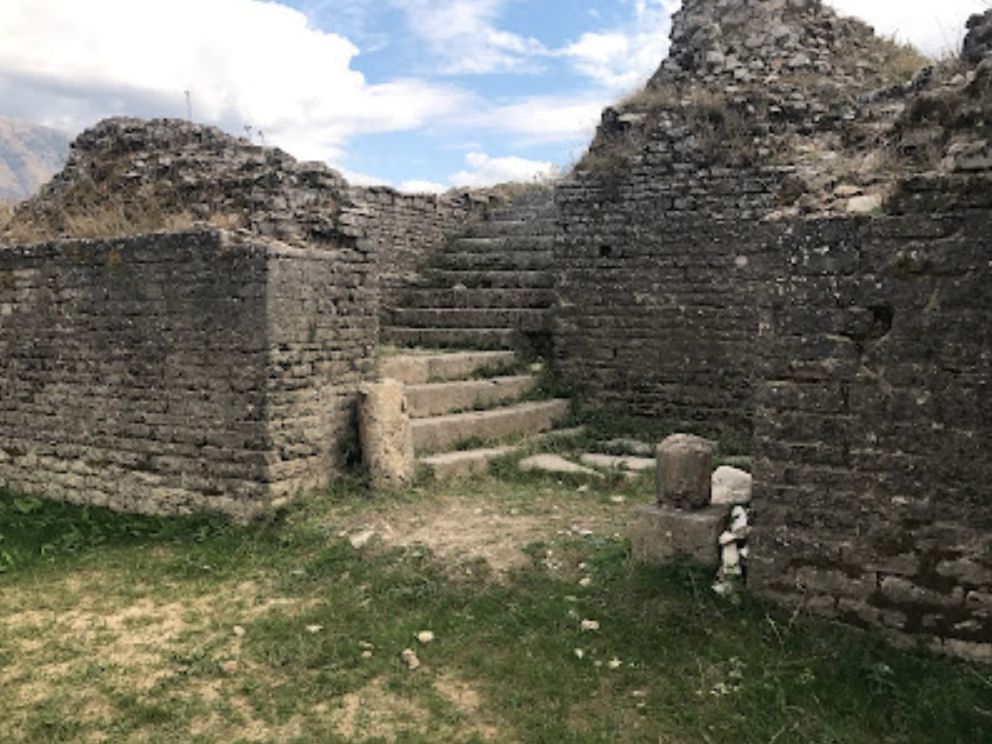
Theatre

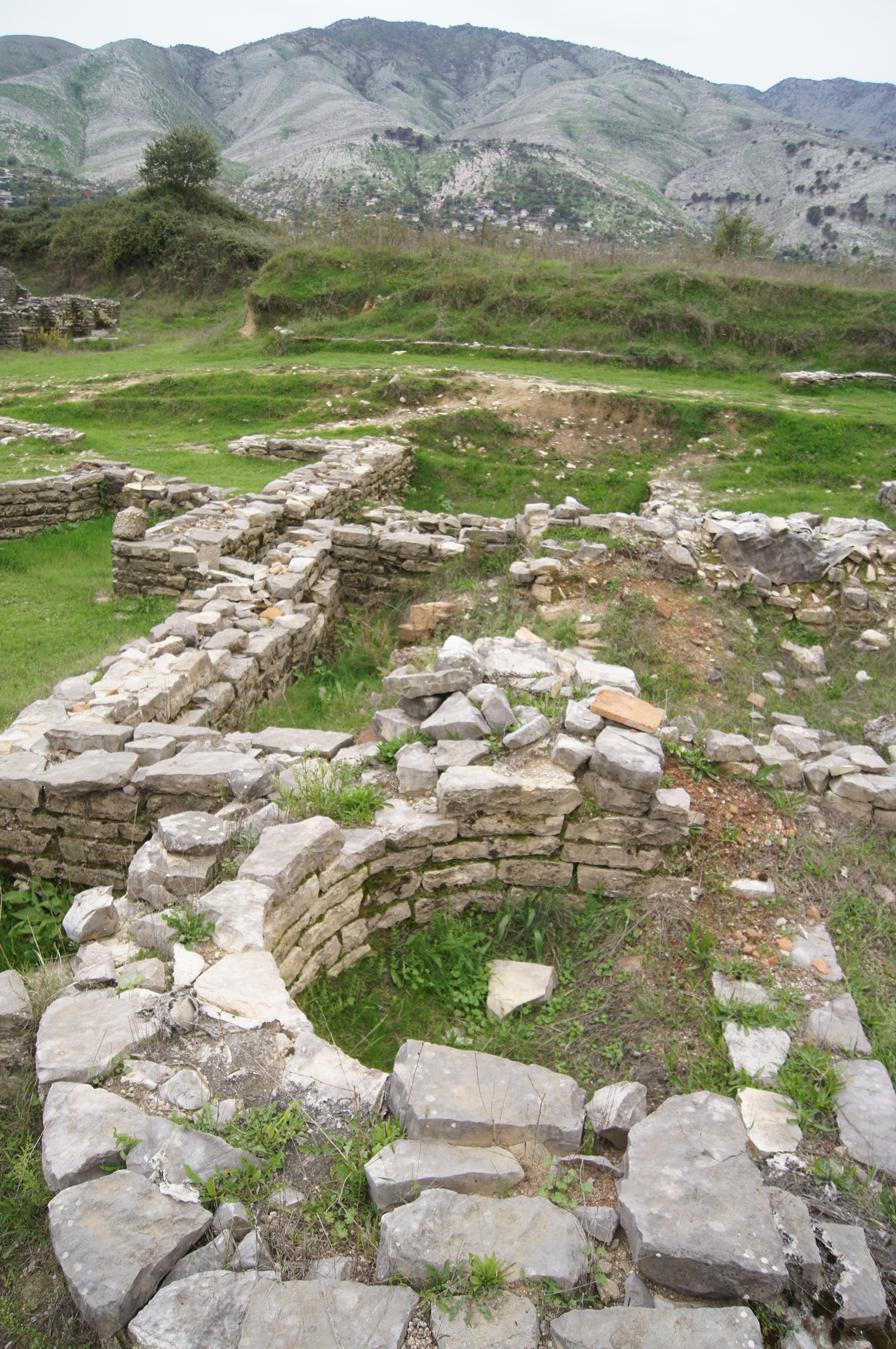
Baths

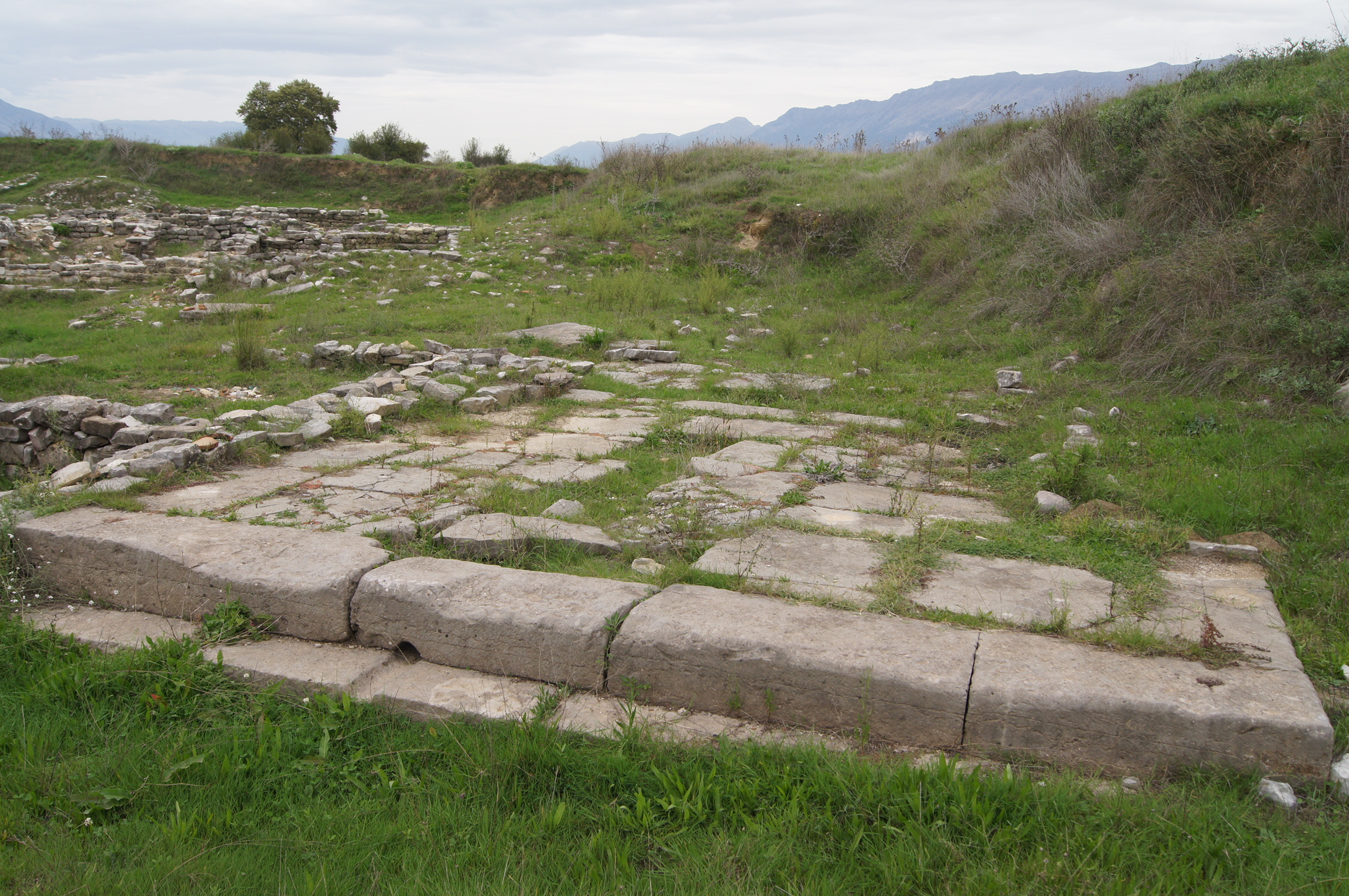
Temple
