= Haskovë =

Haskovë Χάσκοβο
- Village
- Location within Albania
- Coordinates: 40°0′19″N 20°11′46″E
- Country: Albania
- County: Gjirokastër
- Municipality: Dropull
- Elevation: 252 m (827 ft)
- Time zone: UTC+1 (CET)
  - Summer (DST): UTC+2 (CEST)

Haskovë (Albanian definite form: Haskova, Greek: Χάσκοβο) is a village in Gjirokastër County, southern Albania. At the 2015 local government reform it became part of the municipality of Dropull.

== Name ==
The toponym Haskovë is derived from either a hybrid formation from the Turkish Has köy meaning 'royal village' and the suffix -ov-a or from a Slavic personal name Аско, Asko and the suffix -ов-а, -ov-a.

== Demographics ==
The village is inhabited by Greeks and the population was 331 in 1992.
