= Kakavijë =

- Village
- Location within Albania
- Coordinates: 39°54′28″N 20°21′30″E
- Country: Albania
- County: Gjirokastër
- Municipality: Dropull
- Administrative unit: Dropull i Sipërm
- Time zone: UTC+1 (CET)
  - Summer (DST): UTC+2 (CEST)

Kakavijë (Albanian definite form: Kakavija; Greek: Κακαβιά, Kakavia) is a village in the Gjirokastër County, southern Albania. At the 2015 local government reform it became part of the municipality Dropull. It lies near the border crossing of Kakavia/Kakavijë, and is part of the Dropull region.

== History ==
In spring 1833, Albanian rebels led by Tafil Buzi, Zenel Gjoleka and Çelo Picari clashed with Ottoman troops near Kakavijë.

== Demographics ==
The village is inhabited by Greeks and the population was 419 in 1992.
