= Galato Alexandraki =

Greek politician

Galato Alexandraki MEP
- Γαλάτω Αλεξανδράκη
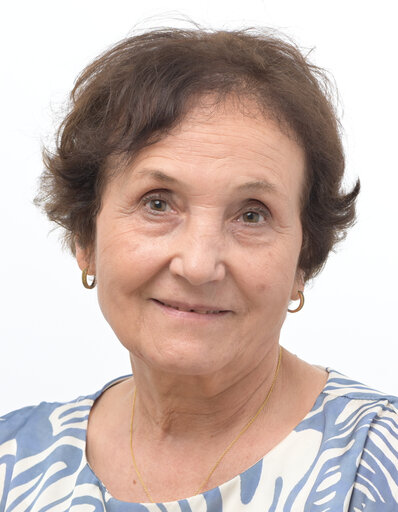
- Official portrait, 2024

Member of the European Parliament for Greece
- Incumbent
- Assumed office 16 July 2024

Personal details
- Born: Galato Alexandraki; 11 December 1948 (age 77) Didymoteicho, Evros, Greece
- Party: Greek Solution (since 2019)
- Children: 2

Galato "Toula" Alexandraki (Greek: Γαλάτω «Τούλα» Αλεξανδράκη; born 11 December 1948) is a Greek member of the European Parliament for the Greek Solution party.

== Biography ==
Alexandraki was born in Didymoteicho and raised in Koufovouno, Evros, where she lived as a livestock farmer until the 1990s. She then relocated to Alexandroupolis and established a butcher's shop, which she continues to run with her son.

Her election result was a major surprise, given that she was virtually unknown not only in the Evros prefecture, where she stood, but also in Alexandroupolis, where she resides and works. Despite not conducting any election campaign, she secured 51,237 votes and came second on the Hellenic Solution ballot paper. Kyriakos Velopoulos, the party leader, stated that Alexandraki was included on the ballot at the request of local farmers. However, the "Breeders of Greece" association has denied any involvement in the selection of candidates. It has also emerged that Alexandraki participated in the double national elections of 2023 (in the Eastern Attica electoral district) to meet the gender quota requirement of 40% for female candidates across all parties. The party leader and Alexandraki herself have attributed her success to her surname starting with the first letter of the Greek alphabet, which placed her at the top of the ballot paper.

Alexandraki, along with Fredis Beleris and Afroditi Latinopoulou, was listed by POLITICO as one of the most eccentric new MEPs in the European Parliament.
