= Agia Marina, Ioannina =

Agia Marina
- Community
- Location within Greece
- Coordinates: 39°48′4″N 20°26′3″E
- Country: Greece
- Administrative region: Epirus
- Regional unit: Ioannina
- Municipality: Pogoni
- Municipal unit: Delvinaki
- Elevation: 508 m (1,667 ft)

Population (2021)
  - Community: 80
- Time zone: UTC+2 (EET)
  - Summer (DST): UTC+3 (EEST)

Agia Marina (Greek: Αγία Μαρίνα, before 1922: Κουσοβίτσα, Kousovitsa, between 1922 and 1926: Βατσουνιά, Vatsounia) is a settlement in Ioannina regional unit, Epirus, Greece. The village is located near the Albanian border. Culturally, the village of Agia Marina is part of Dropull, an area which also extends into Albania.

== Name ==
The toponym is derived from the Slavic form kosovo, from the word kosъ meaning 'blackbird' and the ending -ovo, with the suffix -ica. The linguist Max Vasmer associated the village name with Emperor Alexios I Kosobitza.

== History ==
Following the demarcation of the Albanian–Greek border, the core of the village of Koshovicë (Greek: Κοσοβίτσα, Kosovitsa) became part of Albania. The shacks of the village, used by farmers as warehouses for products or makeshift shelters were located in Greece on the south eastern side of the Dropull valley at a place called Agia Marina, which later became the name of the small settlement.

== See also ==
- List of settlements in the Ioannina regional unit
