= Radat, Dropull =

Radat Ραντάτι
- Village
- Location within Albania
- Coordinates: 39°57′3″N 20°19′56″E
- Country: Albania
- County: Gjirokastër
- Municipality: Dropull
- Elevation: 508 m (1,667 ft)
- Time zone: UTC+1 (CET)
  - Summer (DST): UTC+2 (CEST)

Radat (Albanian definite form: Radati, Greek: Ραντάτι) is a village in Gjirokastër County, southern Albania. At the 2015 local government reform it became part of the municipality of Dropull.

== Name ==
The toponym Radat is derived from either a personal name Радот, Radot, from the forms Радота, Radota and Радотин, Radotin, along with a jъ, ya sound. Linguist Xhelal Ylli states the Bulgarian sound change t into y and then sht is missing. He writes the toponym could be a name from a personal name without suffixation or an Albanian, as the name giver. However, the sound change o into a is difficult to explain; also, the Slavic personal name is stressed on the first syllable and not like the Albanian place name on the last syllable. An explanation as an Albanian formation cannot be ruled out from a Bulgarian personal name Рад, Rad and an Albanian suffix at.

== Demographics ==
The village is inhabited by Greeks and the population was 113 in 1992.
