= Llovinë =

Llovinë Λουβίνα
- Village
- Location within Albania
- Coordinates: 39°50′51″N 20°21′54″E
- Country: Albania
- County: Gjirokastër
- Municipality: Dropull
- Elevation: 508 m (1,667 ft)
- Time zone: UTC+1 (CET)
  - Summer (DST): UTC+2 (CEST)

Llovinë (Albanian definite form: Llovina, Greek: Λουβίνα) is a village in Gjirokastër County, southern Albania. At the 2015 local government reform it became part of the municipality of Dropull.

== Name ==
Linguist Yordan Zaimov reconstructs the toponym as Любиня, Lyubinya, while linguist Xhelal Ylli states the contribution does not explain the present toponym. Ylli writes in Bulgarian there is ловѝна, lovina 'drink; wine', but the semantic motivation and the sound change o to u then o and l into ll remain unclear. Linguist Phaedon Malingoudis explains a similar term from the appellative локвина, lokvina from локва, lokva meaning 'puddle; pool', which Ylli said is also semantically acceptable for Llovinë.

== Demographics ==
The village is inhabited by Greeks and the population was 329 in 1992.
