= Pepel, Dropull =

Pepel Πέπελη
- Village
- Location within Albania
- Coordinates: 39°52′17″N 20°19′46″E
- Country: Albania
- County: Gjirokastër
- Municipality: Dropull
- Elevation: 500 m (1,600 ft)
- Time zone: UTC+1 (CET)
  - Summer (DST): UTC+2 (CEST)
- Website: www.pepeli.gr

Pepel (Albanian definite form: Pepeli, Greek: Πέπελη; romanized: Pépeli) is a village in Gjirokastër County, southern Albania. At the 2015 local government reform it became part of the municipality of Dropull.

Holy Trinity Monastery Church is located within the village, a Religious Cultural Monument of Albania.

== Name ==
The placename Pepel is from a term that refers to clearing and is derived from the Bulgarian word пепел, pepel meaning ash and a y sound at the end of the toponym which through Albanian condensed from l and y into l.

== Demographics ==
According to Ottoman statistics, the village had 392 inhabitants in 1895. The village is inhabited by Greeks and the population was 505 in 1992.
