= Goricë, Dropull =

Goricë Γορίτσα
- Village
- Location within Albania
- Coordinates: 39°58′36″N 20°13′34″E
- Country: Albania
- County: Gjirokastër
- Municipality: Dropull
- Elevation: 252 m (827 ft)
- Time zone: UTC+1 (CET)
  - Summer (DST): UTC+2 (CEST)

Goricë (Albanian definite form: Gorica, Greek: Γορίτσα) is a village in Gjirokastër County, southern Albania. At the 2015 local government reform it became part of the municipality of Dropull.

== Name ==
The toponym Goricë is derived from either the Bulgarian or Serbian word гора, gora meaning 'forest, mountain' and the suffix -иц-а, -its-a. Other possible derivations are from Гор-ьн-иц-a, Gor-an-itsa, or from the Albanian words gorricë, 'wild pear' or gorricë, 'barren ground' both borrowed from Slavic.

== Demographics ==
The village is inhabited by Greeks and the population was 141 in 1992.
