= Selo, Dropull =

Selo Σελλειό
- Village
- Location within Albania
- Coordinates: 39°50′47″N 20°20′39″E
- Country: Albania
- County: Gjirokastër
- Municipality: Dropull
- Elevation: 579 m (1,900 ft)
- Time zone: UTC+1 (CET)
  - Summer (DST): UTC+2 (CEST)

Selo (Albanian definite form: Seloja, Greek: Σελλειό) is a village in Gjirokastër County, southern Albania. At the 2015 local government reform it became part of the municipality of Dropull.

== Name ==
In the Ottoman register of 1431, the placename is rendered as Selyani. Linguists Max Vasmer and Yordan Zaimov state the village toponym is from a local name Селяни, Selyani derived from село, selo a Bulgarian word which means 'village' and the suffix яне, yane. Linguist Xhelal Ylli writes it is difficult to determine whether Selo is the continuation of the assumed, old name Selo or the shortened form of Selyani. For the first case, Ylli says the old document would only contain a resident's name, which is erroneously recorded as a village name in the Ottoman register.

== Demographics ==
The village is inhabited by Greeks and the population was 285 in 1992.
