= Koshovicë =

Koshovicë Κοσοβίτσα
- Village
- Location within Albania
- Coordinates: 39°49′05″N 20°24′27″E
- Country: Albania
- County: Gjirokastër
- Municipality: Dropull
- Elevation: 650 m (2,130 ft)
- Time zone: UTC+1 (CET)
  - Summer (DST): UTC+2 (CEST)

Koshovicë (Albanian definite form: Koshovica; Greek: Κοσοβίτσα/Κοσσοβίτσα; romanized: Kosovítsa/Kossovítsa) is a village in Gjirokastër County, southern Albania. At the 2015 local government reform it became part of the municipality of Dropull.

St. Mary's Monastery Church, located within the village, is a Religious Cultural Monument of Albania.

== Name ==
The placename Koshovicë has several possible origins. The Slavic word кос, kos for the common blackbird and the suffix form ов-иц-а, ov-its-a with a sound change of s into sh through Old Albanian. Other derivations are from the Bulgarian word кош, kosh for 'basket' with the suffix form -ob+-иц-а, -ov+its-a giving a meaning of 'woven', or the toponym is formed from a personal name Кошо, Kosho.

== Demographics ==
According to Ottoman statistics, the village had 188 inhabitants in 1895. The village is inhabited by Greeks and the population was 864 in 1992.

== History ==
Following the demarcation of the Albanian–Greek border, Koshovicë became part of Albania, and the shacks used by its farmers as warehouses for products or makeshift shelters, were located in Greece at a place called Agia Marina, which later became the name of the small village.
