= Dhuvjan Monastery =

Byzantine monastery in southern Albania

Coordinates: 39°59′40″N 20°11′40″E

Monastery of Saints Quiricus and Julietta
- Manastiri i Shën Qirjakut dhe Julitës
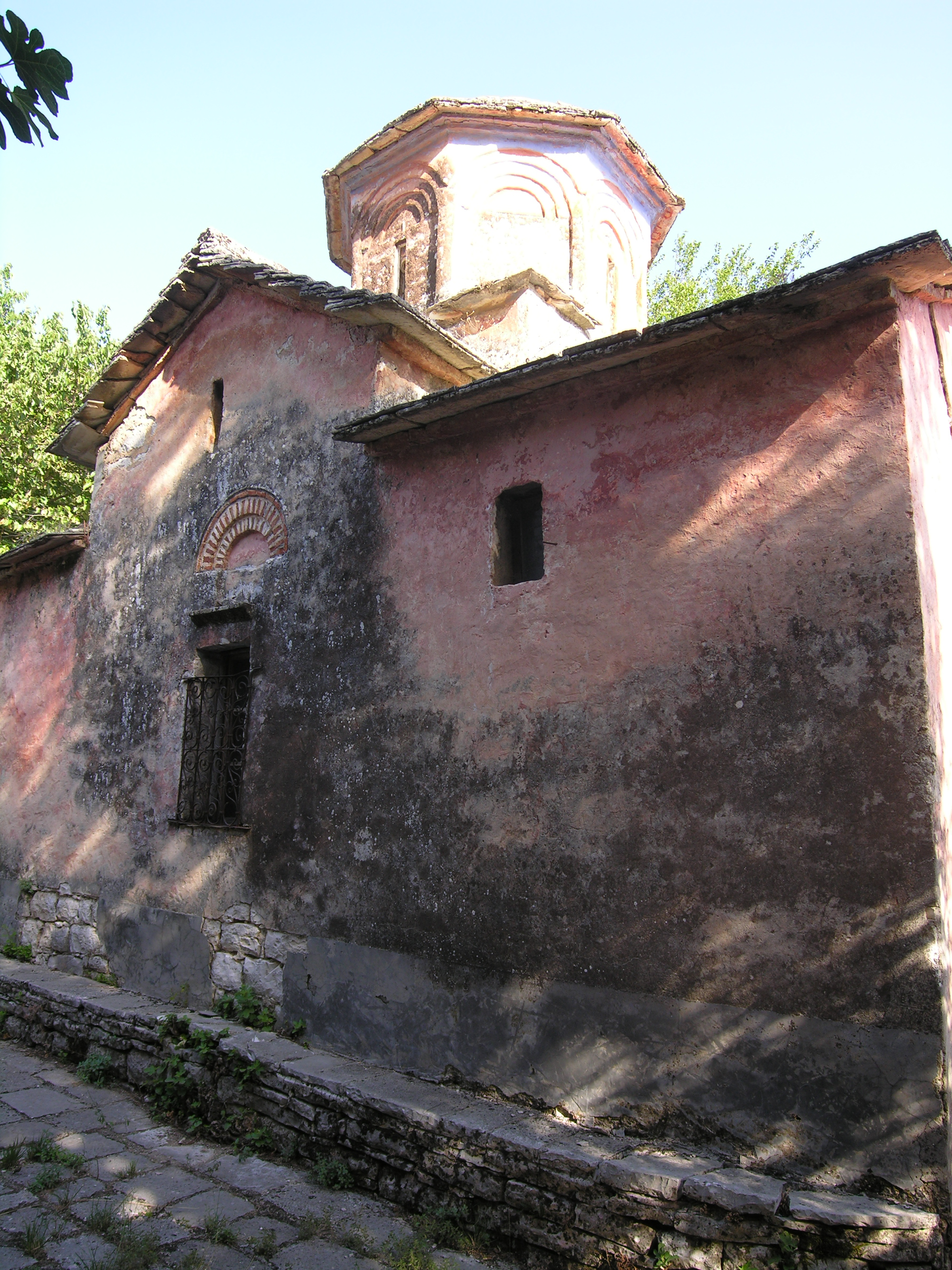
- Interactive map of Monastery of Saints Quiricus and Julietta

Monastery information
- Order: Orthodox Autocephalous Church of Albania
- Established: 1089; 937 years ago
- Dedication: Quiricus and Julietta
- Diocese: Gjirokastër

Site
- Location: Gjirokastër County, Albania
- Public access: yes

The Dhuvjan Monastery (Albanian: Manastiri i Dhuvjanit; Greek: Μονή Δούβιανης), also known as Monastery of Saints Quiricus and Julietta (Albanian: Manastiri i Shën Qirjakut dhe Julitës; Greek: Μονή Αγιού Κηρύκου καί Ιουλίττας), is an Eastern Orthodox monastery located in the western part of the village of Dhuvjan, Gjirokastër County, southern Albania. Founded in 1089 when the area was part of the Byzantine Empire, today it is part of the Albanian Orthodox Church.

== Location ==
The monastery is found on the Drino Valley, in the Dropull region, and lies between the cities of Gjirokastër and Delvinë in southern Albania. It oversees the road between the two cities from the hill where it is situated. It is just one of several monasteries that can be found in the Drino Valley.

== History ==
The monastery is traditionally dated to the 6th century, however, this has been contested due to notes left by a former monk working in the monastery, who alleged that the monastery was built in 1089. The monastery is devoted to the Virgin Mary.

It underwent restoration in the 1960s and was elevated to the status of cultural monument by the Albanian government in 1963. However, another restoration project is needed as much of the monastery's 3000 square metres are near-ruin.

In summer 2006 the village inhabitants announced that the descendants of the village's former priest, Papa Vllasi, excavated an icon from their garden. The object, described as an emblem and dated 1819, bears the names of 6 saints (Saint Julietta, Theodore Stratelates, John Chrysostom, Saint Charalampe, Saint Eleftherios, and Saint Polycarp) and allegedly contains bones of three of them. In order to prevent this very rare object from possible theft, the inhabitants of Dhuvjan change the place of the icon from time to time.

On 5 June 2010, the monastery was robbed by unidentified persons. An old wooden cross, some icons, a fabric with artistic and historical value were stolen from the church, while the robbers have destroyed some parts of carved wood iconostasis. The monastery was previously sacked in 1997 when some very old icons and other items of value were stolen. Currently walls arches, the bell, the trapezaria and other parts of the monastery are at risk of falling down. Currently the monastery is voluntarily cared for by Spiro Panajoti, a retired teacher.

== Education ==
In 1777 a Greek school was established in the monastery by the Orthodox missionary Cosmas of Aetolia. Later, in 1858 Greek education was expanded after the initiative of a local monk called Gerasimos, who established a female, a secondary level and an embroidery school. These educational institutions functioned continuously until 1858, while their costs were covered by the monastery itself. Greek education was active in the monastery until 1913. The last school director was Konstantinos Zerris.

== See also ==
- Dropull
