= Trinity Monastery =

Trinity Monastery may refer to:

- Trinity Monastery (Chernihiv), Chernihiv, Ukraine
- Trinity Monastery of St. Jonas, Kiev, Ukraine

== See also ==
- Holy Trinity monastery (disambiguation)
