= St. Mary's Monastery, Goranxi =

Cultural monument in Albania

St. Mary's Monastery
- Manastiri i Shën Mërisë (Albanian)
- Interactive map of St. Mary's Monastery
- 40.0073°N 20.1685°E
- Location: Goranxi

Cultural Monument of Albania

St. Mary's Monastery (Albanian: Manastiri i Shën Mërisë) is a monastery near Goranxi, Gjirokastër County, Albania. It is a Cultural Monument of Albania.
