= St. Mary's Monastery Church, Koshovicë =

Cultural monument in Albania

St. Mary's Monastery Church
- Kisha e Manastirit të Shën Merisë (Albanian)
- Interactive map of St. Mary's Monastery Church
- 39.8197°N 20.3971°E
- Location: Koshovicë

Cultural Monument of Albania

St. Mary's Monastery Church (Albanian: Kisha e Manastirit të Shën Merisë) is a monastery church in Koshovicë, Gjirokastër County, Albania. It is a Cultural Monument of Albania.
