= Justinianopolis (Epirus) =

Town of ancient Epirus

Coordinates: 39°59′43″N 20°16′22″E

Justinianopolis or Ioustinianoupolis (Ancient Greek: Ἰουστινιανούπολις), was a town of ancient Epirus and of Illyricum, the successor settlement to Hadrianopolis that was repaired and moved by Justinian I. It was one of the cities of the government of old Epirus. The bishop's see that had been established at Hadrianopolis was translated to Dryinopolis rather than to Justinianopolis.

Its site is located near Bregu i Melanit, Nepravishtë, in Albania.
