= Terihat =

Terihat Τεριαχάτες
- Village
- Location within Albania
- Coordinates: 39°59′12″N 20°13′02″E
- Country: Albania
- County: Gjirokastër
- Municipality: Dropull
- Elevation: 250 m (820 ft)
- Time zone: UTC+1 (CET)
  - Summer (DST): UTC+2 (CEST)

Terihat (Albanian definite form: Terihati, Greek: Τεριαχάτι/Τεριαχάτες; romanized: Teriaháti/Teriahátes) is a village in Gjirokastër County, southern Albania. At the 2015 local government reform it became part of the municipality of Dropull.

== Demographics ==
In the Ottoman register of 1520 for the Sanjak of Avlona, Terihat was attested a village in the timar of Is'hak, son of Mahmud. The village had a total of 58 households. The anthroponymy attested belonged almost entirely to the Albanian onomastic sphere, characterised by personal names such as Bardh, Deda, Gjin, Gjon, Kola, Leka, and others. The village also had a small number Muslim households. According to Ferit Duka, the lack of names ending with -s implies a lack of Greek names. According to Doris Kyriazis, Duka's argument is wrong because the absence of the final -s does not show a lack of the Greek element, as this was quite typical in Ottoman records on areas that were undoubtedly Greek-speaking. Another discrepancy, according to Kyriazis, was that Duka ignored the etymology of the local topology and the presence of archaic Greek place names that the Slavs had translated into their own language.

According to Ottoman statistics, the village had 453 inhabitants in 1895. The village is inhabited by Greeks and the population was 626 in 1992.
