= Goranxi =

Goranxi Καλογοραντζή
- Village
- Location within Albania
- Coordinates: 40°1′1″N 20°11′21″E
- Country: Albania
- County: Gjirokastër
- Municipality: Dropull
- Administrative unit: Dropull i Poshtëm
- Time zone: UTC+1 (CET)
  - Summer (DST): UTC+2 (CEST)

Goranxi (Greek: Γοραντζή, romanized: Gorantzi or Καλογοραντζή, romanized: Kalogorantzi) is a settlement in the former Dropull i Poshtëm municipality, Gjirokastër County, southern Albania. At the 2015 local government reform it became part of the municipality of Dropull. It is within the larger Dropull region.

== Demographics ==
In the Ottoman tax registry of 1520, Kalogoranxi (Goranxi e Poshtme) appears as having 151 households. In the same Ottoman register the Albanian anthroponyms Gjon and Gjin are frequently attested, as per. ex. : Gjon Papadopulo, Gjon Bazhani, Gjon Deda, Gjon Kondi, Gjin Bazhani (twice), Gjin Ruvini, Gjin Kostandini, Gjin Nako, Gjin Andoni. However here, the rendering of Jani is more frequent. Other Albanian anthroponyms such as Deda, Laluç and Kol also appear.

The village is inhabited by Greeks, and the population was 820 in 1992.

== Culture ==
=== Religion ===
Orthodox complexes within Goranxi:

- Church of St. Athanasius (Ναός Αγίου Αθανασίου, Kisha e Shën Thanasit)
- Monastery of St. Mary (Μοναστήρι της Παναγιάς, Manastiri i Shën Mërisë) - Declared a "Cultural Monument" (Monumente kulturore) in 1963.

== Gallery ==
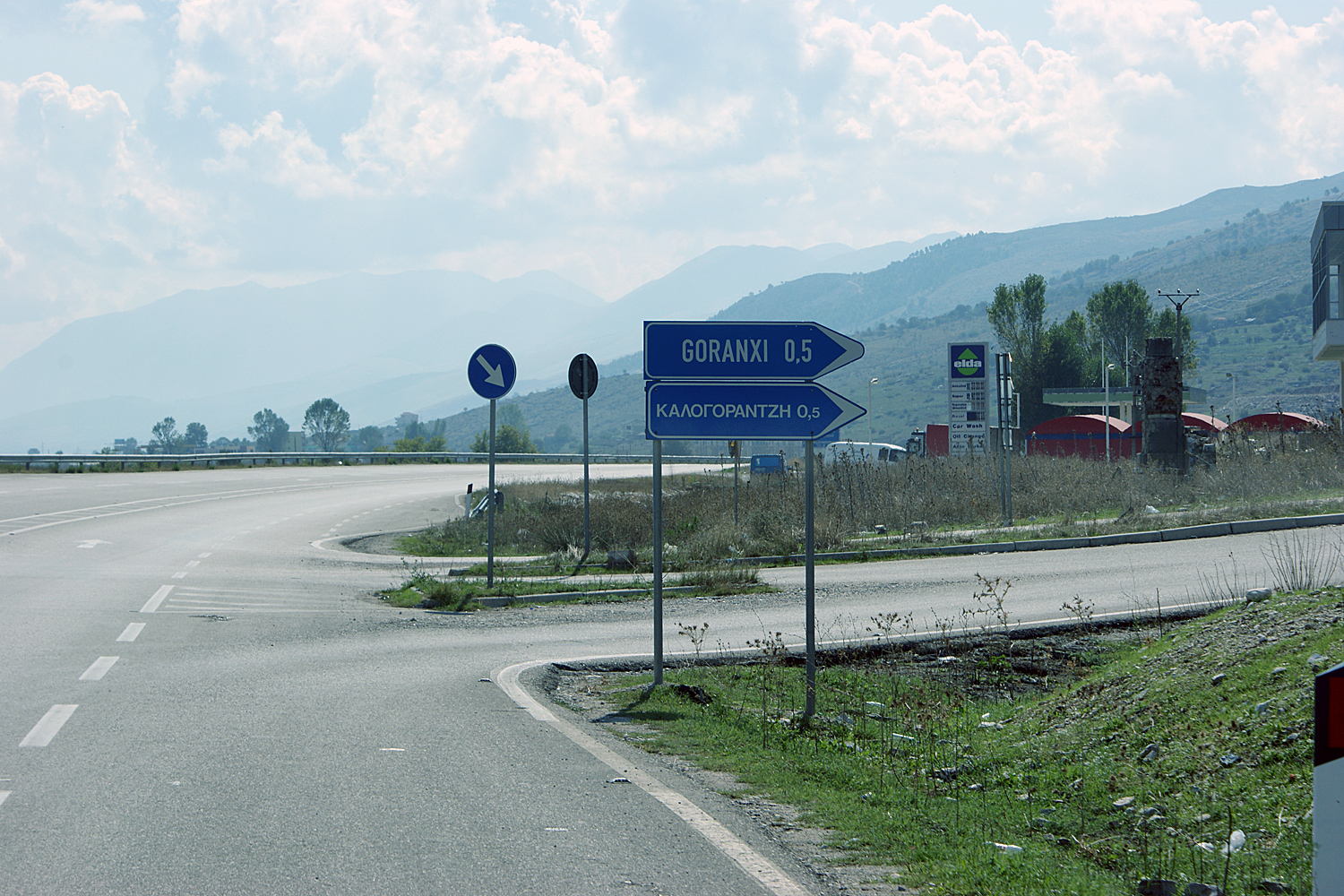
Goranxi Road Sign
