= Grigorios Lambovitiadis =

Greek patriot

Grigorios Lambovitiadis (Greek: Γρηγόριος Λαμποβιτιάδης, 1908-1945) was a Greek patriot, representative of the Greek community in southern Albania and an activist of the Northern Epirus movement. He was executed by the authorities of the People's Republic of Albania as "enemy of the state".

== Life ==
Lambovitiadis was born to a Greek family in the village of Dhuvjan, Ottoman Empire, today in southern Albania. After finishing ground-level studies at his home village he moved to Corfu, Greece. Later, he attended the dentist school of the University of Athens, where he graduated in 1935.

In 1940, during World War II, Lambovitiadis organized Greek resistance groups in his home region Gjirokaster and in nearby Delvinë. After the withdrawal of the Axis forces, the region came under the control of the People's Republic of Albania. Lambovitiadis campaigned against post-war incorporation of Northern Epirus to Albania and protested against machinations of the agents of the Albanian communist party. He opposed the campaign for elections that would declare a one-party state in Albania. As a result, Lambovitiadis, together with other Greek activists, were considered "enemy of the state" and arrested. After being tortured in jail a show trial followed which summarily sentenced him to death.

== Family ==
Lambovitiadis' wife died in prison shortly after. Their son Georgios Lambovitiadis was jailed and exiled by the local regime. After the restoration of democracy in Albania (1991) he was involved in local politics, in particular, defending minority and human rights of the local Greek community. As such, he became the chairman of the Omonoia organization in 1996-1999.

== See also ==
- Vasileios Sachinis
