= Dhrovjan =

Dhrovjan Δρόβιανη
- Village
- Location within Albania
- Coordinates: 39°53′22″N 20°13′3″E
- Country: Albania
- County: Vlorë
- Municipality: Finiq
- Administrative unit: Mesopotam
- Time zone: UTC+1 (CET)
  - Summer (DST): UTC+2 (CEST)

Dhrovjan (Albanian definite form: Dhrovjani; Greek: Δρόβιανη, Droviani) is a community in the Vlorë County, southern Albania. At the 2015 local government reform it became part of the municipality Finiq. It is located 18 kilometers (11 mi) east of Sarandë.

== Name ==
The toponym Dhrovjan is derived from either the Bulgarian word дърво, darvo meaning 'wood', or from a resident name Дроб, Drob and the suffix яне, yane, with the Greek or Albanian sound change d into dh, and the Greek sound change b into v.

== Demographics ==
In the interwar period, Dhrovjan was a village inhabited by Greeks, and contained around 300 houses divided into two mahalle (neighbourhoods).

The village is inhabited by Greeks, and the population was 573 in 1992.

== Notable people ==
- Tasos Vidouris
- Konstantinos Stephanopoulos
- Christos Tzolis
