= Ilongot =

Ilongot may refer to:

- Ilongot people, an ethnic group of Luzon, the Philippines
- Ilongot language, the Austronesian language spoken by them

== See also ==
- Ilongo people, an ethnic group of Mindanao and the Visayas, the Philippines
- Ilongo language
- Llongote, a mountain in Peru
