= Vangjel Tavo =

Albanian politician (born 1969)

Mayor of Himarë
- Incumbent
- Assumed office 30 September 2024
- Preceded by: Arqile Bollano (acting)

Minister of Health
- In office 27 June 2012 – 3 April 2013
- Preceded by: Petrit Vasili
- Succeeded by: Halim Kosova

Member of the Albanian parliament
- In office 1996–2021

Personal details
- Born: 17 December 1969 (age 56) Jorgucat, PR Albania
- Citizenship: Albania; Greece
- Party: Socialist Party (1996–2010, 2021–present); Socialist Movement for Integration (2010–2021)

Vangjel Tavo (Greek: Βαγγέλης Τάβος; 17 December 1969) is an Albanian politician who was elected mayor of Himarë on the repeat elections on 4 August 2024; he was sworn in on 30 September 2024. Tavo was member of the Assembly of the Republic of Albania for the Socialist Movement for Integration and served as the Minister of Health from 2012 to 2013, replacing Petrit Vasili.

Tavo is an ethnic Greek, born on 17 December 1969 in Jorgucat, a village in Gjirokastër County.

Tavo was first in the Socialist Party of Albania but left for joining the LSI.

Tavo started his political career in 1996 when he, representing the Socialist Party of Albania, won the elections in Gjirokastra. Until 2010, he was an MP of Albania, being a member of the Socialist Party; he then moved to LSI.

In March 2024, he accepted Edi Rama's invitation and was appointed prefect of Vlorë County, until he ran in the repeat local elections for the municipality of Himarë with the support of the Socialist Party of Albania, and won his opponent, Petro Gjikuria, who was supported by the opposition. Tavo was sworn in as mayor on 30 September 2024.
