= Bodrishtë =

Bodrishtë Βόδριστα
- Village
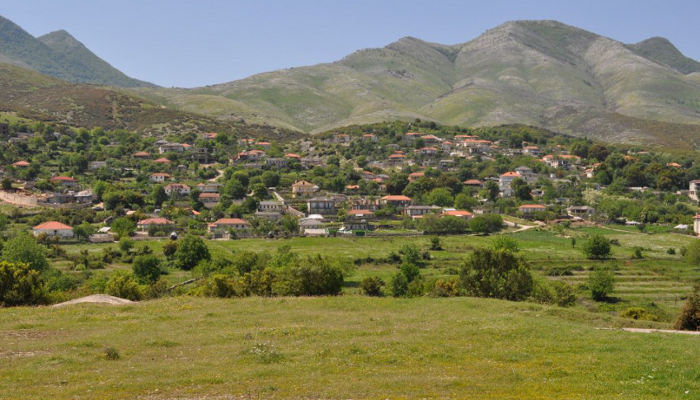
- View of Bodrishtë

- Location within Albania
- Coordinates: 39°54′07″N 20°18′13″E
- Country: Albania
- County: Gjirokastër
- Municipality: Dropull
- Elevation: 344 m (1,129 ft)
- Time zone: UTC+1 (CET)
  - Summer (DST): UTC+2 (CEST)

Bodrishtë (Albanian definite form: Bodrishta; Greek: Βόδριστα, romanized: Vódrista) is a village in Gjirokastër County, southern Albania. At the 2015 local government reform it became part of the municipality of Dropull.

== Name ==
The toponym Bodrishtë is derived from either the Bulgarian word бодър, bodar meaning 'fresh; lively; awoke' or is a patronymic formation from a Bulgarian personal name Пъдар, Padar, where the p underwent a sound change into b, and the suffix ище, ishte.

== Demographics ==
In the Ottoman tax register of 1520 for the Sanjak of Avlona, Bodrishtë was attested a village in the timar under the authority of Ali, the son of Kasem and Jusuf, the son of Ali, who owned it jointly. The village had a total of 153 households. The anthroponymy attested belonged overwhelmingly to the Albanian onomastic sphere, characterised by personal names such as Bardh, Deda, Gjin, Laluç, Gurmir, Gjon, Kola, Leka and others. The village also had 1 Muslim household, that of Jusuf, son of Ali. According to Ferit Duka, the lack of names ending with -s implies a lack of Greek names. Moreover, according to Schmitt the onomastic material of the tax registers allows other interpretations; in particular various local names such as (using Duka's Albanian transliteration): Miho Papapetro, Jani Makrinudhi, Andria Makrinudhi, Miho Spathari suggest the presence of a Greek speaking population. Schmitt concluded that an ethnic-national division can not be drawn; Duka's categorization does not provide clear divisions. According to him, the only conclusion that can be drawn from such data is that the settlements of Dropull were populated by Orthodox communities. Schmitt argues that only the ethno-national opposition since the late 19th century divided this community into national communities. According to Doris Kyriazis, Duka's argument is wrong because the absence of the final -s does not show a lack of the Greek element, as this was quite typical in Ottoman records on areas that were undoubtedly Greek-speaking. Another discrepancy, according to Kyriazis, was that Duka ignored the etymology of the local topology and the presence of archaic Greek place names that the Slavs had translated into their own language.

The village is inhabited by Greeks and the population was 902 in 1992.
