= Vasileios Sachinis =

Greek resistance member

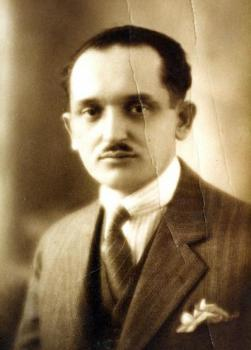
Vasileios Sachinis

Vasileios Sachinis (Greek: Βασίλειος Σαχίνης; 1897 – 18 November 1943) was a Greek leader of the Northern Epirote Liberation Front (MAVI) (1942–1943), an organization related to the National Republican Greek League of Napoleon Zervas.

== Biography ==
Sachinis was born at the village of Dhuvjan in Dropull area (south of Gjirokastër) and studied at the Robert College in Constantinople (Istanbul). Then he became a businessman in Gjirokastër. During World War II and after the retreat of the Greek army from the area, he became part of the Northern Epirote resistance against the Italian and then the German occupation forces in southern Albania (1942–1943). He protested to the Italian Occupation Forces, accusing them that they supported various activities of the Albanian resistance groups against the local Greek population. He became finally targeted by Albanian communists, he was tortured and executed (18 November 1943).

== See also ==
- Grigorios Lambovitiadis
