= Glinë, Dropull =

Glinë Γλύνα
- Village
- Location within Albania
- Coordinates: 39°58′15″N 20°17′29″E
- Country: Albania
- County: Gjirokastër
- Municipality: Dropull
- Administrative unit: Dropull i Poshtëm
- Time zone: UTC+1 (CET)
  - Summer (DST): UTC+2 (CEST)

Glinë (Albanian definite form: Glina; Greek: Γλύνα, romanized: Glyna) is a settlement in the former Dropull i Poshtëm municipality, Gjirokastër County, southern Albania. At the 2015 local government reform it became part of the municipality Dropull. It is within the larger Dropull region.

== Name ==
The toponym Glinë refers to the nature of the soil and derived from a Slavic term for clay.

== Demographics ==
The village is inhabited by Greeks and the population was 376 in 1992.
