= Holy Trinity Monastery Church, Pepel =

Cultural monument of Albania

Holy Trinity Monastery Church
- Kisha e Manastirit të Shën Triadhës (Albanian); Καθολικό Μονής Αγίας Τριάδας (Greek)
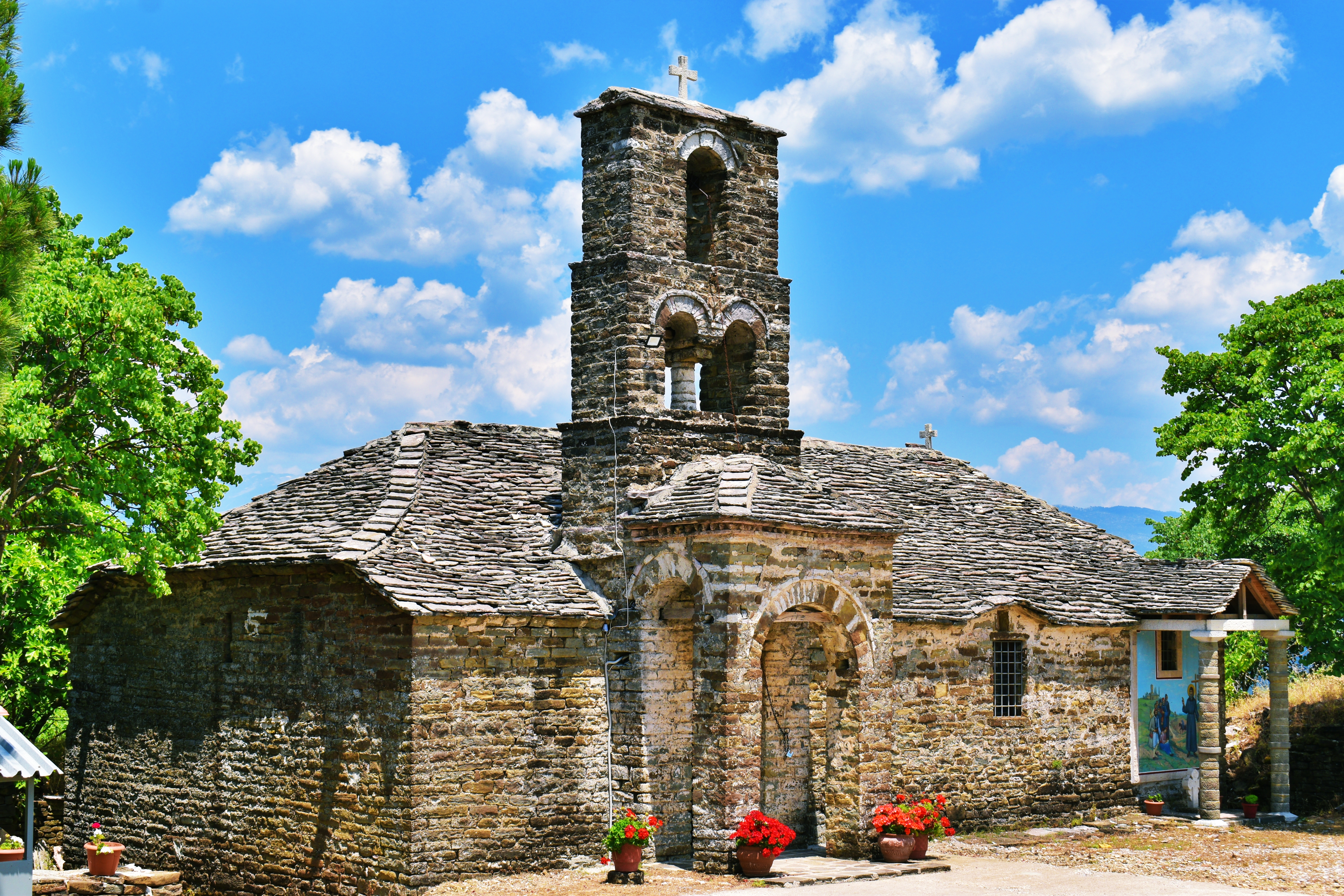
- Interactive map of Holy Trinity Monastery Church
- 39.8652°N 20.3405°E
- Location: Pepel, Gjirokastër County

Cultural Monument of Albania

Holy Trinity Monastery Church (Albanian: Kisha e Manastirit të Shën Triadhës, Greek: Καθολικό Μονής Αγίας Τρίαδας) is the katholikon of the monastery of the Holy Trinity in Pepel, Gjirokastër County, Albania. It is declared as a Cultural Monument of Albania.

During the recent years the Orthodox Autocephalous Church of Albania undertook the renovation of the monastery and its katholikon.
