= Vriserë =

- Village
- Location within Albania
- Coordinates: 39°53′45″N 20°20′44″E
- Country: Albania
- County: Gjirokastër
- Municipality: Dropull
- Elevation: 300 m (980 ft)
- Time zone: UTC+1 (CET)
  - Summer (DST): UTC+2 (CEST)

Vrisera (Greek: Βρυσερά, romanized: Vryserá) is a village in Gjirokastër County, southern Albania. At the 2015 local government reform it became part of the municipality of Dropull.

== Demographics ==
According to Ottoman statistics, the village had 396 inhabitants in 1895. The village is inhabited by Greeks and the population was 311 in 1992.
