= Tasos Vidouris =

Greek poet and author

- Born: 1888; Dhroviani (Delvinë)
- Died: 1967 (aged 79); Patras, Greece
- Occupations: poet, short story

Tasos Vidouris (Greek: Τάσος Βιδούρης; 1888–1967) was a Greek poet and author.

He was born in the village of Dhrovjani (Delvinë District) in modern southern Albania. After finishing ground studies in his village Vidouris entered the Phanar Greek Orthodox College in Istanbul. With his graduation he became a Greek language teacher in his home place as well as in several other Greek schools in the region. He studied in France and became familiar with French literature.

In ca. 1930 he moved to Patras, Greece, and in 1938 he published his first collection of several short stories under the title Diigimata (Greek: Διηγήματα). Vidouris also became Professor in the local University, for a while, shortly before his death in 1967.

Tasos Vidouris published his main collection of poetry under the title Ilissia (Greek: Ιλίσσια). His poetic style follows Naturalism, as it tried to describe local customs and psychological states. He also translated several known works from French to Greek.

His novels were published in a collection under the title Diigimata Greek: Διηγήματα). Vidouris also translated French works.
