= Grapsh =

Grapsh Γράψη
- Village
- Location within Albania
- Coordinates: 39°57′16″N 20°14′53″E
- Country: Albania
- County: Gjirokastër
- Municipality: Dropull
- Elevation: 230 m (750 ft)
- Time zone: UTC+1 (CET)
  - Summer (DST): UTC+2 (CEST)

Grapsh (Albanian definite form: Grapshi; Greek: Γράψη; romanized: Grápsi) is a village in Gjirokastër County, southern Albania. At the 2015 local government reform it became part of the municipality of Dropull.

== Demographics ==
In the Ottoman register of 1520 for the Sanjak of Avlona, Grapsh was attested a village in the region of Dropull. The village had a total of 60 households and the anthroponymy attested belonged almost entirely to the Albanian onomastic sphere, characterised by personal names such as Bardh, Deda, Gjin, Gjon, Kola, Leka, and others. The village also had a small number Muslim households.

According to Ottoman statistics, Grapsh had 341 inhabitants in 1895. The village is inhabited by Greeks, and the population was 512 in 1992.
