= Zervat =

Zervat Ζερβάτι
- Village
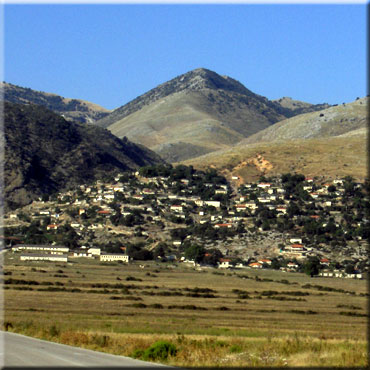

- Location within Albania
- Coordinates: 39°55′00″N 20°17′16″E
- Country: Albania
- County: Gjirokastër
- Municipality: Dropull
- Elevation: 400 m (1,300 ft)
- Time zone: UTC+1 (CET)
  - Summer (DST): UTC+2 (CEST)

Zervat (Albanian definite form: Zervati; Greek: Ζερβάτι, romanized: Zerváti) is a village in Gjirokastër County, southern Albania. At the 2015 local government reform it became part of the municipality of Dropull.

== Name ==
The village received its name due to the conversion of a surname to a toponym. In the case of Zervati its name came from a certain Zervas.

== History ==
The church of the Dormition of the Virgin in Zervat was erected before the Ottoman period, c. 14th century as cross-shaped Byzantine church. It was transformed and enlarged in the 16th century. It is one of the most impressive churches of the period in the region.

== Demographics ==
In the Ottoman register of 1520 for the Sanjak of Avlona, Zervat was attested a village in the timar under the authority of Ali from Damës. The village had a total of 199 households. The anthroponymy attested belonged almost entirely to the Albanian onomastic sphere, characterised by personal names such as Bardh, Deda, Gjin, Gjon, Kola, Leka, Progor and others. The names Gjin, Gjon and Deda as personal names or patronymics make up almost half of the names of Zervat. The village also had a small number Muslim households.

Zervat is inhabited by Greeks, and the population was 603 in 1992. The village today has a permanent population of roughly 200–250 inhabitants, notably due to migration to Greece or other countries.

== Bibliography ==
- Giakoumis, Konstantinos (February 2002). The monasteries of Jorgucat and Vanishte in Dropull and of Spelaio in Lunxheri as monuments and institutions during the Ottoman period in Albania (16th-19th centuries) (PhD thesis). University of Birmingham. Archived from the original on 16 July 2020.
