= Llongo =

Llongo Λόγγος
- Village
- Location within Albania
- Coordinates: 39°50′05″N 20°22′39″E
- Country: Albania
- County: Gjirokastër
- Municipality: Dropull
- Elevation: 580 m (1,900 ft)
- Time zone: UTC+1 (CET)
  - Summer (DST): UTC+2 (CEST)

Llongo (Albanian definite form: Llongoja; Greek: Λόγγος, romanized: Lóggos) is a village in Gjirokastër County, southern Albania. At the 2015 local government reform it became part of the municipality of Dropull.

== Name ==
The placename Llongo is derived from the word 'meadow', rendered in Old Slavic as лжгъ, lag and лъг, lăg in Bulgarian where through old Albanian the reflex ж became on within the toponym.

== Demographics ==
The village is inhabited by Greeks, and the population was 476 in 1992.
