= Dropull =

Dropull Δρόπολη (Greek) / Dropoli
- Municipality
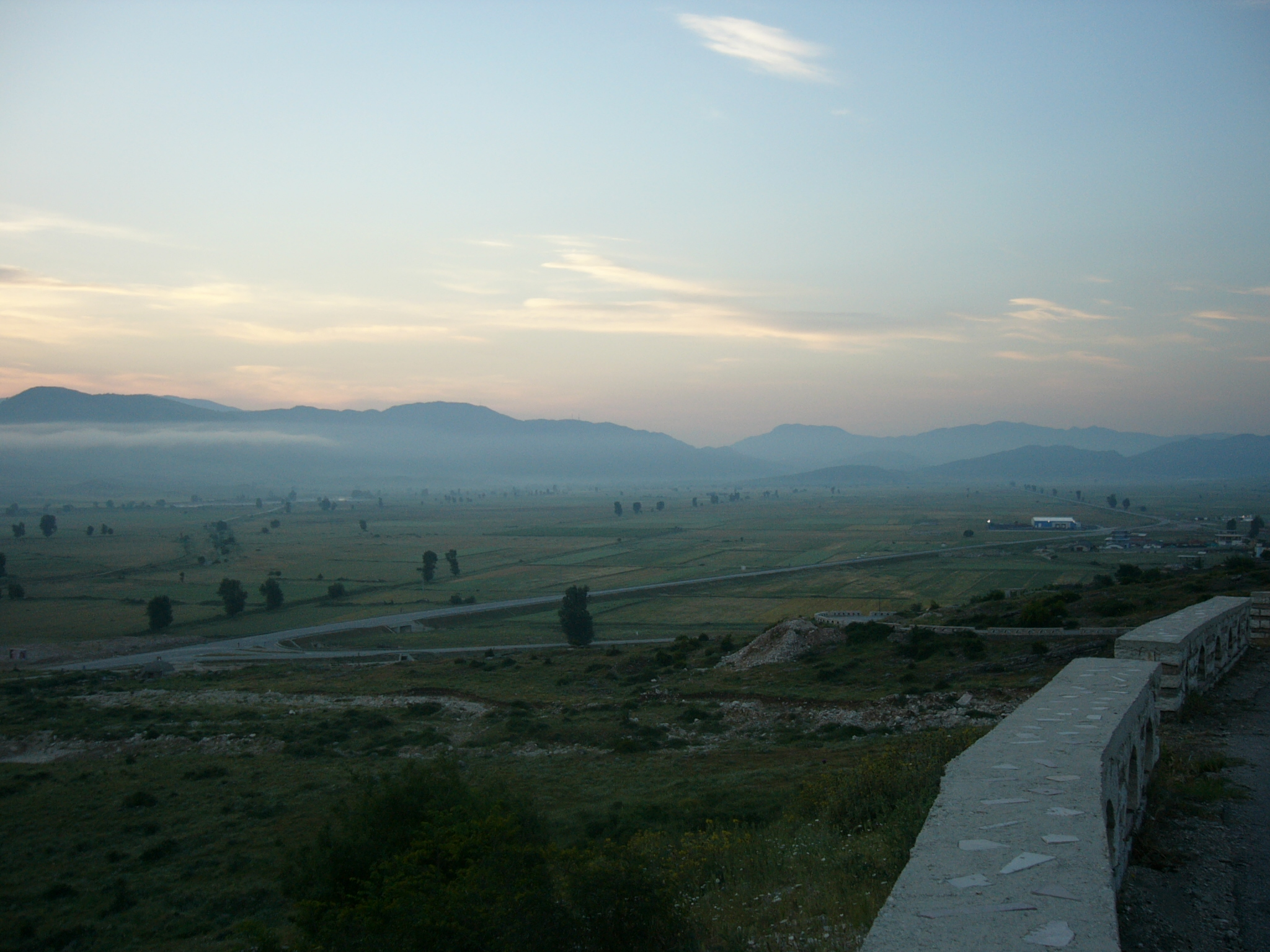
- Dawn near Jorgucat

- Emblem

- Location within Albania
- Coordinates: 39°59′N 20°14′E
- Country: Albania
- County: Gjirokastër

Government
  - Mayor: Dhimitraq Toli (PS)

Area
  - Municipality: 447.01 km^{2} (172.59 sq mi)

Population (2011)
  - Municipality: 3,503
  - Municipality density: 7.837/km^{2} (20.30/sq mi)
- Time zone: UTC+1 (CET)
  - Summer (DST): UTC+2 (CEST)
- Area Code: (0)884
- Website: www.bashkiadropull.gov.al

Dropull (Albanian definite form: Dropulli; Greek: Δρόπολη or Δερόπολη Dropoli or Deropoli) is a municipality in Gjirokastër County, in southern Albania. The region stretches from south of the city of Gjirokastër to the Greek–Albanian border, along the Drino river. The region's villages are part of the Greek "minority zone" recognized by the Albanian government, in which majorities of Greeks live.

The municipality Dropull was created in 2015 by the merger of the former municipalities Dropull i Poshtëm, Dropull i Sipërm and Pogon. The seat of the municipality is the village Sofratikë. According to the 2011 census the total population is 3,503; according to the civil registry of that year, which counts all citizens including those who live abroad, it is 23,247. The municipality covers an area of 448.45 km^{2} (173.15 sq mi).

== Name ==
A city called Hadrianopolis was founded in the region by the Roman emperor Hadrian (r. 117–138). The Synecdemus of Hierocles, which contains a list of the administrative divisions and cities of the Byzantine Empire during the time of Theodosius II (r. 402–450), mentions the city of Αδριανούπολις (Adrianoúpolis) and places it in the region of Dropull. With the gradual adoption of Christianity, the city became a diocese sometime before 431; initially under the jurisdiction of the Metropolis of Nicopolis, and later under the Metropolis of Ioannina. The diocese of Adrianoúpolis is mentioned in the sources without interruption, from the 5th century onwards. In a letter of emperor Leo III (r. 717-741) to the metropolitan bishop of Nikopolis, the bishop of Adrianoúpolis (Αδριανουπόλεως) is also mentioned, while in a source at the end of the 12th century the latter is mentioned as bishop of Drinoúpolis (Δρινουπόλεως). The relevant attestations also include the name Adernoboli, as recorded by the Arab traveler Muhammad al-Idrisi at the end of the 12th century. Also, in the Chronicle of the Tocco, written around 1400, the form Δερνόπολιν (Dernópolin) is attested. According to Hammond, the first attestation of the name Drinoúpolis (Δρινούπολις) is from the 8th century, while according to Sakellariou from the 11th century as Dryinoúpolis (Δρυϊνούπολις); however Kyriazis supports that this form was a literary creation. The region is today called in Albanian Dropull or def. form Dropulli, and in Greek Δρόπολη (Drópoli), Δερόπολη (Derópoli) or Dhropolis.

=== Etymology ===
According to Çabej, Drópull has been formed from Drinópolis/Dryinópolis (Δρυϊνόπολις) which contains the name of the local river Drino; Drinópolis > Drópull. According to Kyriazis, the etymology of Çabej is not convincing, because he ignores the former name of Adrianoúpolis. Using the available literary evidence (both ancient and medieval), Kyriazis offered the following evolution; Αδριανούπολη (Adrianoúpoli) > Αdernoboli > Δερνόπολη (Dernópoli) > Δερόπολη/Δρόπολη (Derópoli/Drópoli). The form Dernópoli (Greek: Δερνόπολιν) is preserved in the Chronicle of the Tocco written in c. 1400, while the evolution of -ρν- > -ρ- (in reference to Dernópoli > Derópoli/Drópoli) according to Kyriazis is a common characteristic of the Greek dialects in southern Albania.

Demiraj considers Dropull to derive from Hadriano(u)polis, as the most likely etymology. He provided a number of reasons, which according to him, support the evolution of Hadrianopolis > Dropull within an Albanian-speaking population. (Note: In Albanian words in general and toponyms in particular have undergone significant phonetic reductions (e.g., Berat < Belgrade) due to the predominantly dynamic accent of this language. While in Greek, due to its predominantly melodic accent, the ancient words have undergone less change.; In Greek the voiced dental occlusive /d/ evolved before the modern era into the voiced interdental fricative /ð/ (/dh/), while Albanian has preserved the distinction between the sounds /d/ and /ð/ (/dh/) (as happened with the river-name Drino).; In Albanian the sound /-l-/ between two vowels in ancient native or borrowed words, systematically produced the velarized dark /ł/, while in Greek the /-l-/ followed by an anterior vowel has always been pronounced as lateral clear /l/.; The evolution /-o-/ > /-u-/ in the last syllable also indicates that Dropull acquired this phonetic form from Albanian under the influence of the voiceless bilabial plosive /-p-/, while in Greek such a phenomenon did not occur (e.g. poli(s), politis, Dhropolis etc.).; Another piece of evidence is the phonetic evolution undergone by the namesake of another ancient city, Hadrianopolis in Thrace, which evolved through Greek into Andrinopol, and through Turkish into Edirne.) He added, that among the two current forms of Albanian Dropull and Greek Dhropolis, the original form is that with the initial /D-/. Furthermore, Albanian uses either the voiced dental occlusive /d/ or the voiced interdental fricative /ð/ (/dh/) (e.g. the name Dhrovjan) and so it wouldn no be difficult to borrow the Greek form Dhropol-is; whereas in Greek, the letter Δ/δ, which was once pronounced as a sound stop /d/, has long been pronounced only as a sound fricative /ð/ (/dh/). Thus, according to him, the Greek speakers of the area transformed the initial /D-/ into /ð-/ (/dh/) and replaced the final syllable -pull with the Greek form -polis, producing the form Dhro-polis.

== History ==
=== Antiquity ===
During the Middle Helladic period (2100-1550 BC), a double tumulus was dug out in Vodhinë, with strong similarities to the grave circles at Mycenae, showing a common ancestral link with the Myceneans of southern Greece. In classical antiquity, the area was inhabited by the Greek tribe of the Chaonians.

From the Roman period there was a settlement named Hadrianopolis (of Epirus) in the region, one of several named after the great Roman emperor Hadrian. The settlement was built on a strategic spot in the valley of the river Drino near the modern village of Sofratikë, 11 kilometers south of Gjirokastër.

The foundations of Hadrianopolis were first discovered in 1984 when upper sections of the amphitheater were noticed by local farmers. Italian and Albanian archaeologists subsequently excavated much of the site, revealing a full amphitheater, Roman baths, and changing rooms. The site of the agora (forum) has been detected using ground radar, and excavation is expected in the period 2018 onwards. In the amphitheater, there are post holes for iron railings on first row seats. Also some "changing rooms" - originally for actors - were converted to holding pens for wild animals. This was a site where Romans fed enemies of the state to wild animals.

During the 6th century the Byzantine emperor Justinian I, as part of his fortification plans against barbarian invasions, moved the settlement 4 kilometers southeast in the modern village of Peshkëpi, in order to gain a more secure position. The city is also referred in Byzantine sources as Ioustinianoupolis (or Justinianopolis), after him. Today, ruins of the fortifications are still visible, as are the aqueduct and a medieval Orthodox Christian church.

=== Middle ages ===
During the 11th century the city was named Dryinoupolis, a name possibly deriving from its former name or from the nearby river. It was also, from the 5th century, the see of a bishopric (initially part of the Diocese of Nicopolis, Naupactus and then Ioannina).

In the last quarter of the 14th century, the Albanian Zenebisi clan were rulers of the provinces of Gjirokastër and Dropull, as recorded by the Chronicle of Ioannina. In 1380 the Albanian clans of Zenebisi and Mazaraqi were defeated in the battle of Politzes, fighting against the allied forces of the Epirote despot, Thomas Preljubović, and of the chieftain of the Ottoman frontier forces, Isayim. With the help of the Ottoman forces in 1382 Thomas subdued the Albanian clans of Zenebisi and Zulani in the north of Ioannina and reconquered the provinces of Dropull, Vagenitia and Vella. In 1384 Dropull was occupied by Isaym. The Zenebisi retook control shortly after. At the end of 1395-beginning of 1396 a new Ottoman attack, led by Evrenoz bey, was undertaken against Gjin Zenebisi. In 1399 Esau de' Buondelmonti, the despot of Ioannina, whilst at peace with the Albanian Shpata clan, moved against Gjin Zenebisi, with an army that consisted of men from the Albanian clans of Mazara and Malakash, as well as from Zagor-Dropull and great Zagori. Esau recruited Greeks evidently from Zagori, Papingo, Dropull and great Zagori. However, at the battle of Mesopotamon Esau was defeated outright and held in captivity. Gjin Zenebisi consequently extended his dominion to the whole northern part of Vagenitia. In 1400 the Venetians pleaded for peace to him ('Geomi Zenebissi qui tenet terram de la Sayata'). The Zenebisi clan dominated the area until the Ottomans started the second stage of conquest occupying the castle of Gjirokastër in 1418 and expelling the clan.

=== Ottoman period ===
Ottoman presence in Epirote and Albanian lands began in the 14th century.

In 1571 a short lived rebellion broke out under Emmanuel Mormoris, but Ottoman control was restored that same year.

During the 16th and 17th centuries at least 11 Orthodox monasteries were erected in the region with the support of the local population. This unprecedented increase in the number of monasteries has led many scholars to name Dropull as "little Mount Athos". In terms of local religious art the end of the 16th century saw the continuation of iconographic motives of the Cretan school as witnessed in the monasteries of Driano (1583) and the Birth of the Theotokos in Dhuvjan (1594–1595).

As soon as the Greek War of Independence (1821–1830) broke out several locals rose in revolt and participated in the armed struggles.

=== Modern period ===
At the end of the 19th century, many inhabitants migrated to the United States.

In 1927 Albanian state authorities decided to close down all Greek language schools in the region as part of drastic measures against Greek education. As a result, the Greek population filed an official protest to the Albanian government asking for the re-opening of their community schools. The Albanian state proceeded to massive arrests, while at October 1, 1935, c. 100 Albanian gendarmes were dispatched to Dropull and proceeded to arrests and exiled several Greek teachers. The demonstrations in Dropull spread to the adjacent Greek communities, including the regions of Permet and Delvine. As such the Albanian government tried to negotiate the issue with representatives of the country's Greek minority. This turn of events fuelled the decision of the League of Nations in favour to the ethnic Greek minority.

During World War II and the developments of the Greco-Italian War the region came under the control of the Greek army in 1940–1941. At that time the population of Lower Dropull welcomed the advancing Greek units and provided them support in matters of food and accommodation.

During the era of the People's Republic of Albania (1945–1991) the state recognised a Greek minority but this was primarily limited to the Dropull region, while state national policy encouraged the transition from a Greek Orthodox to an Albanian identity (with population displacements and encouraging mixed marriages).

The Peshkëpi incident occurred on 10 April 1994. Eight men, later identified as members of the Northern Epirus Liberation Front, a Greek nationalist paramilitary organization, attacked an Albanian army barracks in Peshkëpi, Dropull; in the attack, two Albanian border soldiers were killed, and three were wounded.

== Dialect ==
As part of the Greek dialects spoken in Albania, known also as Northern Epirote dialects, the dialect of Dropull forms a clear continuum between those of Ioannina and those of Corfu and the Ionian islands. The local Greek dialect features characteristics of southern vocalism. There is also a presence of the syneresis types, a features also seen at the nearby dialects of Delvine, Saranda, Pogon, Himara and northern Thesprotia, while the uncontracted present tense prevails.

== Onomastics and demographics ==
=== Defter of 1431–1432 ===
During the fifth and sixth centuries, Epirus Vetus experienced a number of Slavic incursions. According to Johannes Koder (1982), the local settlements that were built around the fortified city of Hadrianopolis were destroyed, but the city was saved. Following that destruction, the local inhabitants and the new Slavic immigrants chose to settle in more mountainous locations at Mali i Gjerë. According to the Ottoman defter of 1431–1432 for the Sanjak of Albania, the majority of toponyms attested appear to have been Slavic (albeit often distorted) rather than Greek or Albanian; though by that century Slavic had disappeared as a spoken language in the region. Furthermore, these recorded settlements were in a different location than that of the modern villages of Dropull, and a number of them aren't attested in later periods. The precise date of abandonment and relocation is not known, but in the 16th century the growth of peasant settlements is documented at new sites and formerly deserted villages of the 15th century.

=== Defter of 1520 ===
In the Ottoman land-survey register (mufassal defter) of 1520 for Dropull, in the Sanjak of Avlona, the region is divided into two administrative units (nahiye); that of the core territory and the lands of the Iflaklar. Both were dependent on the authorities based in the kaza of Gjirokastër. The register was published in 1990 by the Albanian Ottomanist Ferit Duka. He presented data for 21 settlements of Dropull; these are Upper Goranxi, Zervat, Asharat (Isharat), Lower Goranxi, Vodhinë, Koshovicë, Jorgucat, Bodristë, Terihat, Lugari, Gorica, Grapsh, Letovinë, Dhuvjan, Llovinë, Lower Frashtan, Krina, Derviçan, Haskovë, Vanistër, and Sofratika. The article didn't include data for eight settlements of Upper Dropull; these are Bularat, Kërrë (Kra), Klishar, Selo, Sotirë, Llongo, Kakavijë and Dritë (Ai-Nikolla). The original text was written in the Ottoman script of siyāḳat;. Duka has emphasized that the task of transliterating different parts from the defter of 1520 was not easy, and required a lot of time and effort; aside of siyāḳat, this was also due to the particular thinness of the script. Filip Liço (2009) acknowledged Duka as an expert of Ottoman Turkish who has performed a difficult task of faithfully transliterating the anthroponyms from the Ottoman register; however, he concluded that there are a number of mistakes in the transliteration. Giakoumis (2002) has criticized the methodology of Duka. One of the points he addresses, includes the omitted collation of the original Ottoman text; especially when we consider examples of Duka's transliterations which include the letter ë, because we do not know which phoneme of the original Ottoman Turkish corresponds to it.

In the core region, the anthroponymy attested overwhelmingly belonged to the Albanian onomastic sphere, characterized by personal names such as Bardh, Deda, Gjin, Gjon, Kola, Leka, and Progor (a form of the Albanian anthroponym Progon which underwent Tosk rhotacism) among others. A small presence of Slavic anthroponymy (e.g., Andrica, Petko, Stojko) is also recorded. Albanian personal names also appear in the Iflaklar (Vlach or Aromanian) settlements (e.g., Koshovicë, Lovinë, Vodhinë), indicating that there was an intense process of assimilation and symbiosis between the two ethno-linguistic groups of the wider region. There are a number of surnames that are clearly distinguishable as Greek, such as Papdhopullo, Dhespoti, Konturaki, Makrinudhi, Kovrallari, Nikopullo, Papapetro etc.'. Besides the significant Albanian anthroponymic element, there are also settlements with mixed Greek, Slavic, Albanian, and Aromanian anthroponyms, as well as settlements where the predominance of Greek anthroponyms is evident; such as in Derviçan. The register also provides insights into movements from neighboring territories and villages into Dropull. Namely, the surnames Zagoriti, Llaboviti, Filati and Miguli were recorded; of these the first two have the Greek suffix -iti(s). For example, four household heads from Lovinë bore the surname of Zagoriti indicating their origins from the ethnographic region of Zagoria to the north of Dropull.

Christian Orthodox names in the Ottoman register of 1520 that don't have a clear ethnic affiliation have been a subject of debate. Duka (1990) considers the lack of the Greek suffix -s as strong indication that in that part of the anthroponymy of the region there are "no traces of the presence of the influence of Greek". According to Demiraj (2008) a number of the anthroponyms such as Gjon, Gjin, Gjergj, Lekë and Pal are also attested in forms influenced by the Greek Orthodox Church: Jani, Jorgo, Aleks and Pavllo albeit lacking the characteristic Greek suffix -s (as seen in Janis, Jorgos etc.). He attributes the presence of these forms to the significant role of Greek Orthodox Church in southern Albania in general, particularly the area of Dropull. Demiraj hesitates to favour the possibility of an early Greek presence in the area based on historical indications and onomatological features and points out that further research is needed in this field. According to Kyriazis and Spyrou (2011), Demiraj's main weakness in his approach is that he is ignoring the corresponding Greek literary evidence.

Schmitt (2015) argues that Christian Orthodox names such as – using Duka's Albanian transliteration – Miho Papapetro, Jani Makrinudhi, Andria Makrinudhi, Miho Spathar in the village Bodrishtë, suggest the presence of a Greek-speaking population in the region. According to Schmitt, Greek name influence among Aromanian names was also strong as in the village Sotirë. Schmitt concluded that the onomatological evidence in most villages is mixed and as such an ethnic-national division can not clearly be drawn, as Duka's categorization does not provide clear divisions. According to him, the only conclusion that can be drawn from such data is that the settlements of Dropull were populated by Orthodox communities, while only Aromanian villages were noticeably separated under the context of Ottoman administration. Schmitt argues that only the ethno-national opposition since the late 19th century divided this community into national communities. Kyriazis (2022) argues that the absence of the suffix -s does not show a lack of the Greek element, as this was quite typical in Ottoman records from areas that were undoubtedly Greek-speaking. A view also corroborated by the Ottomanist scholar Kostas Kamburidis (2013).

Liço also disagrees, and says that Greek names in the genitive, accusative, and vocative cases don't have the suffix -s; this suffix is only observed in the nominative case. Giakoumis says that in Greek the surnames are often given in the genitive case without the suffix -s; especially in Epirus and in the provinces of Dropull and Pogon. Both Giakoumis and Liço add, that in Ottoman mufassal defterler, such as this one, the names were given in response to the question 'whose household ...' or 'how do you call him', and the interpreter answered in the genitive or accusative cases without the suffix -s. According to Liço, the eliding of the suffix -s in Greek names, is further corroborated when we consider undoubtedly Greek surnames in the defter, that also lack it.

Kyriazis (2018), after assessing the presence of the Greek language in the region, pointed to Duka's failure to take into account the etymology of the local toponymy and the presence of archaic Greek place-names, which the Slavs had translated into their own language. Liço, having studied the names of settlements and microtoponyms in the region, concluded that out of the 2,778 in total, 2,324 were Greek, 57 Slavic, 184 Albanian, 90 Turkish, and 123 unidentified. Kyriazis (2022), having reviewed another publication from 2005 which presented the toponyms of the region, reached more or less the same conclusion; though he had reservations about a possible higher frequency of Slavic toponyms; as observed in the names of the villages of Dropull. The same author also pointed to the frequency of anthroponyms that are characteristic of northern Albania (such as the name Martin or the surname Martini), and suggested that the population that bore them could have descended to Dropull from northern Albania during the first centuries of the second millennium, and could have eventually continued further south to form parts of the population of Arvanites; especially when we consider that Dropull has always been a passage from north to south.. He believes that such an approach could explain the contradiction between the anthroponyms and toponyms in the region, and added that such temporary settlement of Albanians in medieval and late-medieval Dropull, partially disturbed its demography, but this wasn't significant in order to alter the toponymy of the region. Furthermore, he stated that the preservation of Greek though the centuries, as well as local surnames of Albanian origin, indicates that the Albanian-speaking population who settled there, found a Greek-speaking population and was eventually assimilated by it; just like it previously happened with the Slavs, the traces of which are evident in local surnames and toponyms. He claims that this approach is further supported when we compare the anthroponyms and toponyms of the adjacent region of Pogon, which was both then and now geographically isolated, and therefore more conservative linguistically; the defter of 1520 shows that this region didn't have any Albanian anthroponyms, or it had very few traces of them, while the linguistic character of its toponymy is similar to that of Dropull.

=== Later accounts ===
Literary evidence provided by Athanasios Psalidas at the beginning of the 19th century mentions that the settlements of Dropull are primarily inhabited by Christian Greeks. Schmitt (2015) argues that even in the 20th century, the region was still linguistically mixed. In field work by Leonidas Kallivretakis (1994), the valley of Dropull is inhabited by compact Greek communities. In his research he found Dropull consisting of 34 villages, all of which inhabited by ethnic Greek communities. Today, Dropull is inhabited by ethnic Greeks, who use the Greek language to communicate with local government. The natives use the Greek language towards the local government authorities and the toponyms and street addresses are written in both Albanian and Greek in official documents.

== Religion ==
At c. 400 a bishopric was established as Diocese of Hadrianopolis in Epirus, a suffragan of the Metropolitan Archdicoese of Nicopolis, capital of the Late Roman province of Epirus Vetus. It was suppressed by the Pope c. 1000, but later got an Orthodox successor. The bishopric of Dryinoupolis included the region of modern southwest Albania and from the early 16th century its center was Argyrokastro (modern Gjirokastër).

=== List of monasteries ===
- Monastery of the Prophet Elias, near Jorgucat (founded before 1586)
- Annunciation Monastery, Vanista (before 1617)
- Dormition of the Theotokos or Ravenia Monastery, Kalogoranxi (6th century)
- Dorminition of the Theotokos, Koshovicë (17th century)
- Monastery of Saints Quiricus and Julietta or Dhuvjan Monastery, Dhuvjan (1089)
- Dorminition of the Theotokos or Driyanou Monastery, between Bularat and Zervat
- Monastery of the Taxiarchs Michael and Gabriel, Derviçan (16th century)
- Dormition of the Theotokos, Frashtan (16th century)
- Monastery of the Holy Trinity, Pepel (1754)
- Nativity of the Theotokos or Zonarion or Kakiomenou Monastery, Lovinë (before 1761), abandoned in the 20th century due to proximity to the Greek-Albanian border
- Theotokos Monastery (10th century), Zervat, abandoned during the crusades (11th century)

=== Catholic titular see ===
The Catholic diocese was nominally restored in 1933 as Latin Titular bishopric of Hadrianopolis in Epiro (Latin; adjective Hadrianopolitan(us) in Epiro) / Adrianopoli di Epiro (Curiate Italian). It is vacant since decades, had had only the following incumbent of the fitting Episcopal (lowest) rank: Josef Freusberg (1953.04.12 – death 1964.04.10), as Auxiliary Bishop of Fulda (Germany) (1953.04.12 – 1964.04.10).

== Villages ==
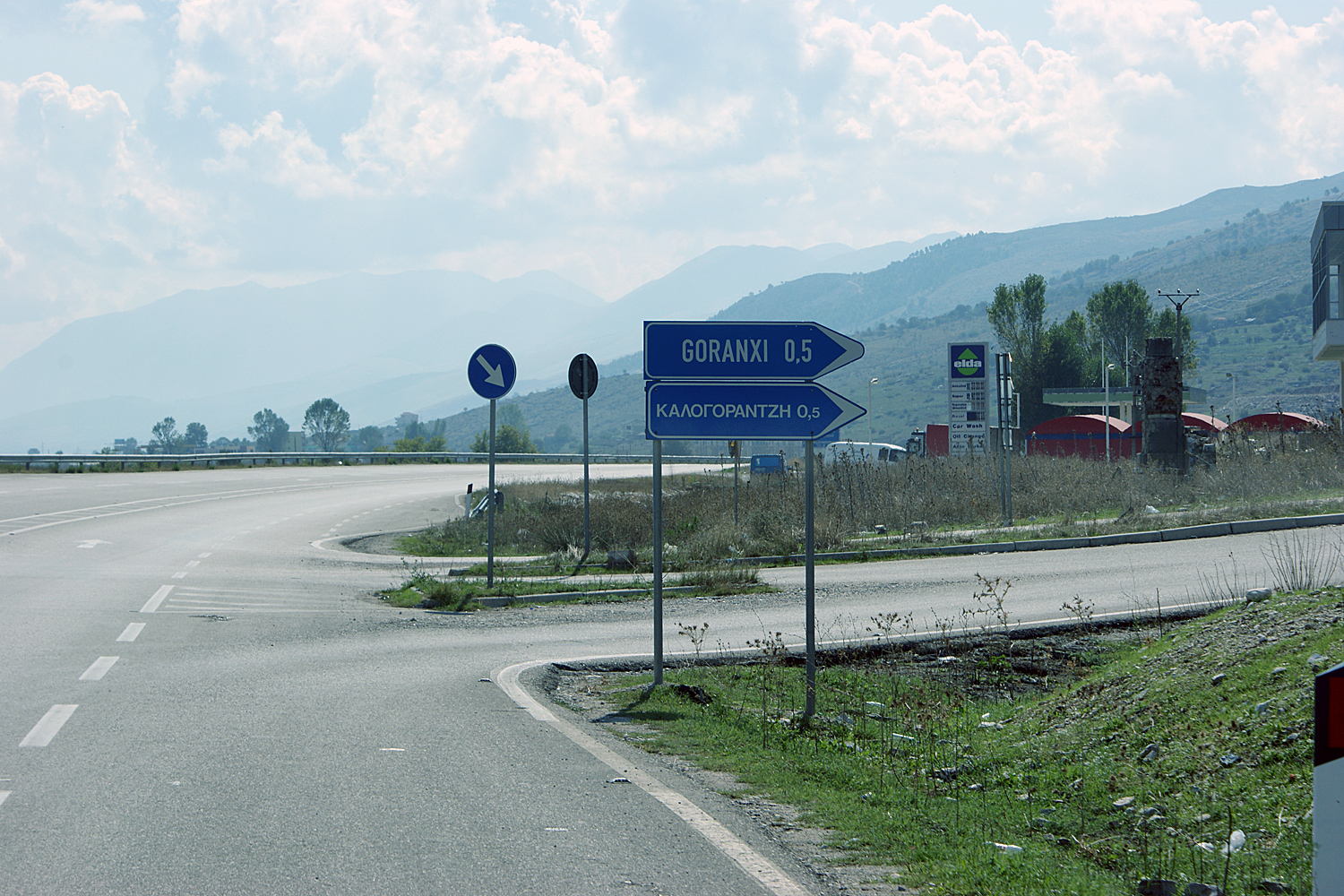
Bilingual roadsign, in Albanian and Greek.

According to the 2011 census the total population of Dropull is 3,503.

- Bularat
- Derviçan
- Dhuvjan
- Glinë
- Vrisera
- Goranxi
- Jorgucat
- Bodrishtë
- Peshkëpi
- Sofratikë
- Sotirë
- Zervat
- Kakavijë
- Grapsh
- Terihat
- Lugari
- Haskovë
- Vanister

In western Pogoni, Greece, the villages of Agia Marina, Chrysodouli, Ktismata, Mavropoulo, Neochori and Zavrocho are culturally part of the wider Dropull area.

== Municipal Council ==
Seat distribution in the Municipal Council

Following the 2023 local elections, the composition of the Council of Dropull is as follows:

Name	Abbr.	Seats
Socialist Party of Albania; Partia Socialiste e Shqipërisë	PS	15
Together We Win; Bashkë Fitojmë	BF	3
Ethnic Greek Minority for the Future; Minoriteti Etnik Grek për të Ardhmen	MEGA	2
Social Democracy Party of Albania; Partia Demokracia Sociale e Shqipërisë	PDS	1

== Notable locals ==
Politics

- Grigorios Lambovitiadis, activist of the Northern Epirus movement
- Spiro Ksera, politician
- Vasilios Sahinis, leader of the Northern Epirote Liberation Organization

Culture and sports

- Kosmas Thesprotos, scholar
- Leonidas Kokas
- Lefter Millo, international soccer player, capped with the Albania national football team
- Tasos Vidouris, poet
- Kleoniki Delijorgji, Miss Albania 2012 and Miss Globe International 2012
- Konstantinos Koufos (singer), singer
- Christos Tzolis, football player of Club Brugge and the Greece national team
- Christos Mastoras, singer
- Stavros Pilios, international footballer for the Albania national team, his parents were from Dropull

== Twin towns – sister cities ==
Dropull is twinned with:

- Trikala, Greece

== See also ==
- Deropolitissa
- Peshkëpi killing
