= Zvërnec =

Zvërnec Σβέρνιτσα Zvârneț
- Village
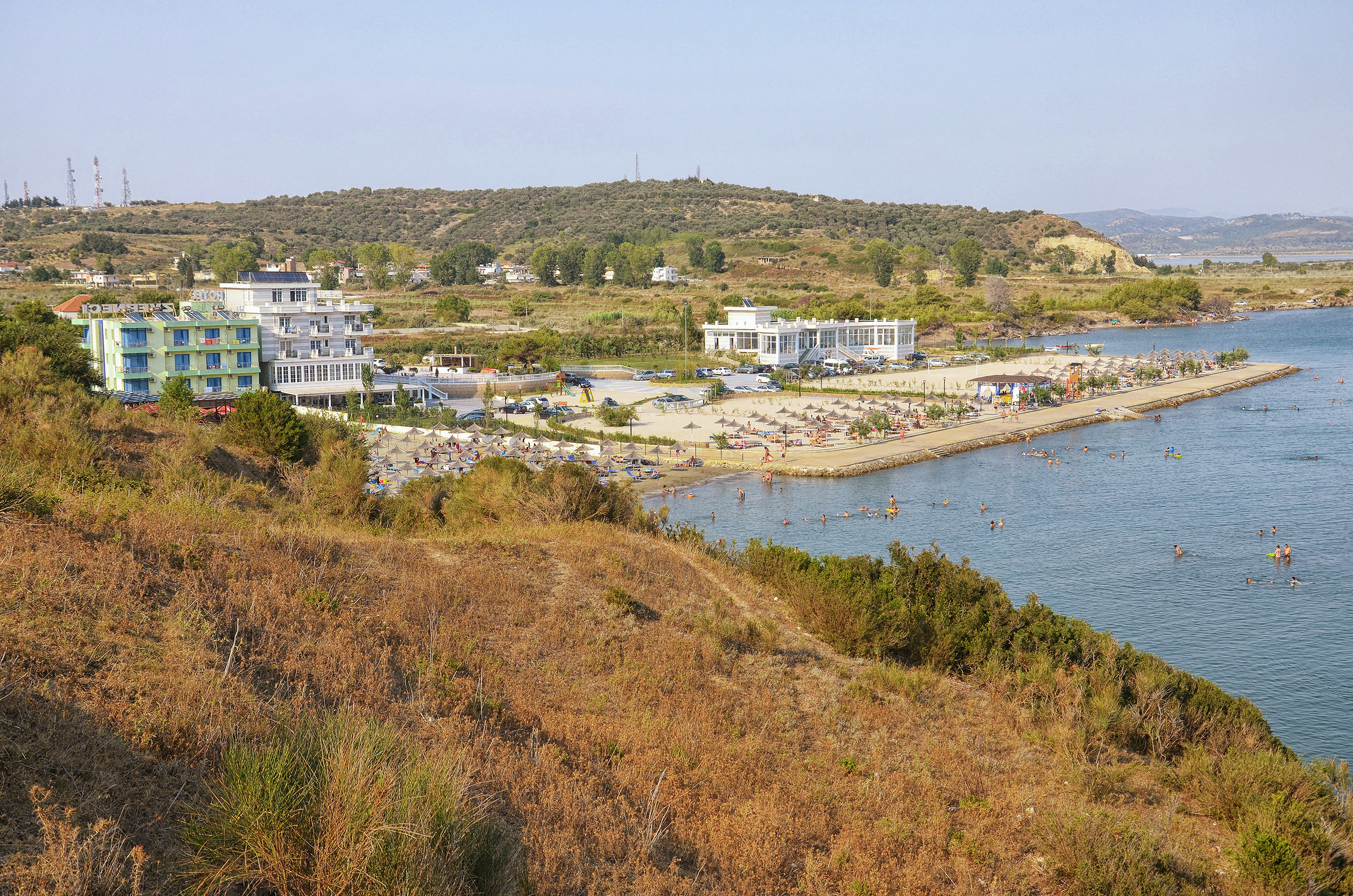
- View of the Zvërnec coast

- Location within Albania
- Coordinates: 40°30′53″N 19°25′6″E
- Country: Albania
- County: Vlorë
- Municipality: Vlorë
- Administrative unit: Qendër Vlorë
- Time zone: UTC+1 (CET)
  - Summer (DST): UTC+2 (CEST)
- Kep i Treporteve Lighthouse
- Construction: stone
- Height: 10 m (33 ft)
- Shape: quadrilateral (bottom), octagon (top)
- Markings: Unpainted
- Focal height: 70 m (230 ft)
- Range: 9 nmi (17 km; 10 mi)
- Characteristic: Fl W 5s

Zvërnec is a community in Vlorë County, Albania. Following the 2015 local government reform, it became part of the municipality of Vlorë. The settlement lies northwest of the city of Vlorë. The village is inhabited by Greeks and Aromanians.

== Name ==
The toponym Zvërnec is derived from the Slavic word zvěr 'wild beast', rendered in Bulgarian as звяр (zvjar) and in Old Church Slavonic as звѣрь (zvěrĭ). The suffix has either an ец (ets) or ьн-ец (yn-ets) formation.

In Albanian the definite form of the name is Zvërneci. In Greek the village is known as Σβέρνιτσα (Svérnitsa) and in Aromanian as Zvârneț.

== History ==
During classical antiquity, the coastal area of the Bay of Vlorë, where the present-day villages of Zvërnec and Nartë are located, was inhabited by Illyrians and Ancient Greek colonists. Since these two villages today constitute the northernmost pockets of Modern Greek speech, Hatzopoulos (1997) raises the question of whether this is a coincidence or whether they represent isolated linguistic relics of the ancient Balaiitai and Horikioi.

The view that the Greek-speaking populations of Zvërnec and Nartë represent an uninterrupted presence from antiquity is rejected by Sh. Demiraj (2010), who argues that this hypothesis lacks linguistic or historical evidence. Instead, Demiraj proposes that their ancestors were relatively late arrivals from the Greek-speaking regions around Arta. Anthroponymic data preserved in 16th-century defters, specifically those of 1520 and 1583, which record predominantly south Albanian Orthodox names in Nartë. The personal names also lack the Greek suffix -s and include consonants uncommon in Modern Greek, such as /b/ (e.g., Bogdan, Tërbari). Moreover, some surnames indicate immigration from neighbouring Albanian villages (such as Bulku or Palasa). Demiraj concludes that the question of Greek-language use in the area remains open.

Kyriazis (2012), however, argues that the 16th-century Ottoman registers also contain evidence supporting continuity and internal differentiation of the population. He further notes that the absence of the suffix -s does not necessarily indicate a lack of Greek presence, as this omission is common in Ottoman documentation from unquestionably Greek-speaking regions. Kyriazis additionally remarks that, if the local Greek speech has historical depth reaching into antiquity, it is necessary to investigate when and how northern vocalic features entered the dialect. He suggests that these developments may reflect either later settlement by speakers of northern Greek varieties during the early Ottoman period or internal linguistic evolution. According to local traditions among some of the village inhabitants, Zvërnec was originally settled during the Middle Ages by people from the Greek coast, who stayed initially on Sazan island before moving to the hill to build a permanent community.

Historian Alain Ducellier identified the medieval city of Spinarica with Zvërnec. In 1297, Spinaritza was governed by the dux Kalamanos, a member of the noble Greek Strategopoulos family. In 1301, Andronikos Palaiologos became the governor of the Spinarica district.

In 2026, Zvërnec became the focus of environmental protests and political controversy following the approval of a proposed luxury resort development backed by Affinity Partners, the investment firm founded by Jared Kushner. Environmental organisations and local activists alleged that construction activities within the nearby Pishë Poro–Narta protected area had damaged wetlands, dunes, and forested zones, while Albanian authorities maintained that the works complied with applicable permits and environmental regulations. The controversy intensified following confrontations between protesters, private security personnel, and police during demonstrations at the site. In response, Albanian prime minister Edi Rama stated that opposition to the project was amplified by "enemies of Israel and Albania", "bots", and "fake profiles", and the project would still commence for the sake of developing Albania's tourism sector.

== Demographics ==
According to local traditions among some of the village residents, the initial inhabitants of Zvërnec arrived from the Greek coast during the Middle Ages. They initially stayed on Sazan island before moving to the hill, where they established a permanent community. In the late 17th century, the Ottoman traveller Evliya Çelebi stated that Zvërnec was inhabited by 150 Christian families who worked either as fishermen or in the salt marshes. By the early 19th century, five Aromanian families also resided in Zvërnec.

Zvërnec, together with nearby Nartë, forms a Greek-speaking enclave in the area north of Vlorë. The village is composed of two neighbourhoods. The oldest part is located on the hill and is inhabited by Greeks, while the second, established along the shoreline in the early 20th century, is populated by Aromanians. During the interwar period, Zvërnec was inhabited by both Greek and Aromanian speakers. In the early 21st century, all the villagers speak Greek and Albanian, with the Aromanians also speaking Aromanian. The inhabitants possess dual citizenship (Albanian and Greek) and share common links to Greece, whereas those on the hill view themselves as belonging to a Greek minority in Albania, a status unrecognised by the Albanian government. Aromanians were viewed as an outsider group by the original villagers, and relations between the two groups only began to form at a community and familial level in the modern period.

A dwindling student population led to the closure of the village school in 2007. According to a 2014 state report, the total number of registered citizens belonging to the Greek minority in the area was 900. By 2018, Zvërnec had 1,332 registered inhabitants, and approximately 85 percent were emigrants. Specifically, 1,101 people had moved mainly to Greece, with 24 villagers migrating internally to Tiranë or Vlorë. The remaining residents numbered 207, with an average age of 62 years. Summer is when almost all migrant families return to Zvërnec, with a smaller influx of domestic migrants during Orthodox Easter.

== Location ==
The surrounding region contains extensive salt marshes. The Narta Lagoon, which hosts a distinctive ecosystem, lies north of the village. Near Zvërnec is the island of Zvërnec, which houses the Byzantine monastery dedicated to the Dormition of the Mother of God. To the east of the settlement there is a lighthouse.

== Notable people ==
- Fatos Arapi, Albanian writer and translator

== Bibliography ==
- Demiraj, Shaban (2010). "Narta". In Demiraj, Bardhyl (ed.). Wir sind die Deinen: Studien zur albanischen Sprache, Literatur und Kulturgeschichte, dem Gedenken an Martin Camaj (1925-1992) gewidmet (in Albanian). Harrassowitz Verlag. ISBN 978-3-447-06221-3.
- Council of Europe; Albania Ministry of Health and Environment (1995). Protection of coastal areas of the Adriatic Sea: proceedings: colloquy organised within the framework of European Nature Conservation Year 1995 in co-operation with the Ministry of Health and Environment of Albania. Council of Europe Publishing. ISBN 978-92-871-2851-5.
- Fourth Report submitted by Albania pursuant to Article 25, paragraph 2 of the Framework Convention for the Protection of National Minorities (Report). Ministry of Foreign Affairs, Republic of Albania. Archived from the original on 29 December 2018.
- Hammond, Nicholas Geoffrey Lemprière (1967). Epirus: the Geography, the Ancient Remains, the History and Topography of Epirus and Adjacent Areas. Oxford: Clarendon Press. ISBN 978-019814253-9.
- Hammond, Nicholas Geoffrey Lemprière (1994). Collected Studies: Alexander and his successors in Macedonia. A.M. Hakkert.
- Hatzopoulos, M. B.; Loukopoulou, L. D.; Sakellariou, M. B. (1997). Epirus: 4000 Years of Greek History and Civilization. Greek lands in history. Ekdotike Athenon. ISBN 978-960213377-4. Archived from the original on 22 April 2023.
- Laurìa, Antonio; Flora, Valbona; Guza, Kamela (2020). Five Albanian Villages. Guidelines for a Sustainable Tourism Development through the Enhancement of the Cultural Heritage (PDF). Firenze University Press. ISBN 978-88-5518-174-7. Archived (PDF) from the original on 7 December 2025.
- Kahl, Thede (1999). Ethnizität und räumliche Verbreitung der Aromunen in Südosteuropa [Ethnicity and geographical distribution of Aromanians in Southeast Europe] (in German). Universität Münster, Institut für Geographie der Westfälischen Wilhelms. ISBN 9783980393577.
- Kyriazis, Doris (2012). "The Greek Idiom of Arta (Vlore)". 10ο Διεθνές Συνέδριο Ελληνικής Γλωσσολογίας. Archived from the original on 6 December 2024.
- Kyriazis, Doris K. (2018). "Language contact and onomastics: tautological constructs, folk etymologies and some methodological issues". Romanoslavica. LIV (3): 161–170. ISSN 2537-4214. Archived from the original on 20 September 2022.
- "Law nr. 115/2014" (PDF) (in Albanian). Archived (PDF) from the original on 25 February 2022.
- Nicol, Donald M. (1984). The Despotate of Epiros 1267–1479: A Contribution to the History of Greece in the Middle Ages. Cambridge University Press. ISBN 9780521261906.
- Ylli, Xhelal (1997). Das slavische Lehngut im Albanischen. Teil 2: Ortsnamen [Slavic Loan Material in Albanian. Part 2: Placenames] (PDF) (in German). Verlag Otto Sagner. ISBN 9783876907727. Archived from the original (PDF) on 12 February 2022.
