= Narta Lagoon =

Lagoon in Albania

- View of flamingos flying over the Narta Lagoon

- Location within Albania
- Location: Vlorë County, Albania; Southern Europe
- Coordinates: 40°32′6″N 19°25′30″E
- River sources: Vjosë River
- Ocean/sea sources: Adriatic Sea
- Surface area: 41.8 km^{2} (16.1 sq mi)
- Average depth: 0.7 m (2.3 ft)
- Max. depth: 1.5 m (4.9 ft)
- Settlements: Vlorë, Orikum

Narta Lagoon (Albanian: Laguna e Nartës) is a lagoon of the Adriatic Sea in the central coast of Albania. The lagoon extends north of the Bay of Vlorë on the eastern shore of the Strait of Otranto and is separated from the sea by a narrow littoral strip, consisting of an alluvial dune. It has a surface area of 41.8 km^{2} (16.1 sq mi) with a maximal depth of 1.5 m (4.9 ft).

It is situated within the boundaries of the Vjosa Wild River National Park, and has been recognised as an important Bird and Plant Area of international importance. As of May 2020, it is home to 3,000 flamingos. It is formed by the constant accumulation of solid flow of the Vjosa River, which originates within the Pindus Mountains close to the border between Albania and Greece.

The lagoon is named after the village of Nartë, which is found on the lagoon's southern shores. Within the lagoon are two islands, the largest being Zvërnec Island. A wooden footbridge connects mainland to the island, where a 13th-century monastery is located. At least 34,800 wintering birds can be counted on the lagoon.

== See also ==
- Flamingo Revolution
- Vjosa–Nartë Protected Landscape
- Sazan Island Resort
- Karaburun-Sazan Marine Park
- Vjosa Wild River National Park
- Geography of Albania
- Biodiversity of Albania
- Protected areas of Albania
- Important Bird Areas of Albania
