= St. Mary's Monastery, Zvërnec =

13th-14th century church in Albania

St. Mary's Monastery Albanian: Manastiri i Shën Mërisë Albanian: Manastiri i Fjetjes së Hyjëlindëses Mari
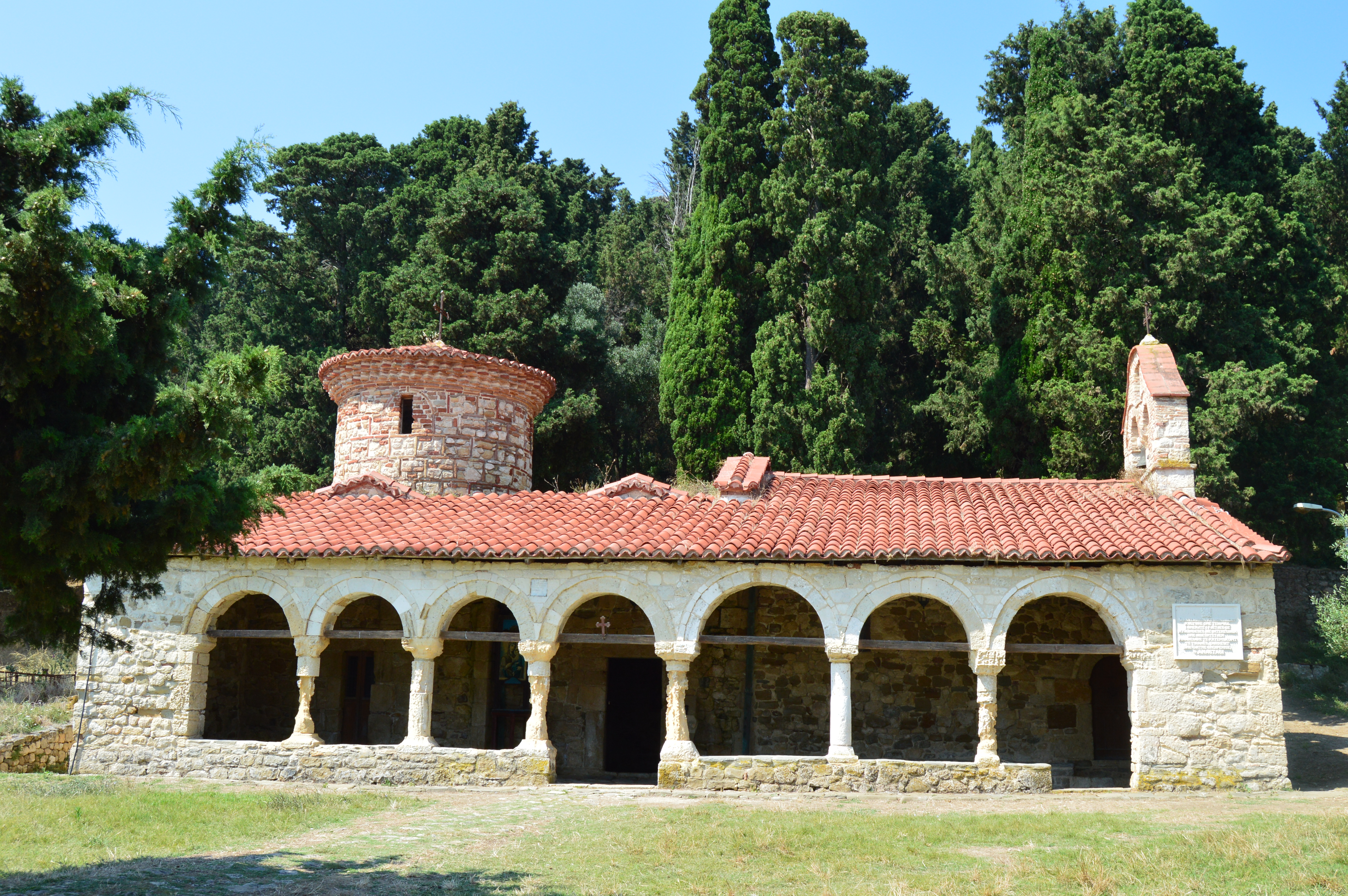
- Zvërnec Monastery
- Interactive map of St. Mary's Monastery; Albanian: Manastiri i Shën Mërisë; Albanian: Manastiri i Fjetjes së Hyjëlindëses Mari
- 40°31′02″N 19°24′9″E
- Location: Zvërnec Island, Vlorë County; Albania

History
- Built: 13th or 14th century

Cultural Monument of Albania
- Designated: 1963

The St. Mary's Monastery (Albanian: Manastiri i Shën Mërisë), also known as the Monastery of Dormition of Theotokos Mary (Albanian: Manastiri i Fjetjes së Hyjëlindëses Mari) and as Zvërnec Monastery (Albanian: Manastiri i Zvërnecit) is an Albanian Orthodox Church in the Zvërnec Island inside the Narta Lagoon, northwest of the city of Vlorë.

== History ==
When St. Mary’s Monastery was founded—most likely between the 11th and 14th centuries—it did so in a landscape where the present-day village of Zvërnec did not yet exist. At that time, both the island and the adjacent mainland were under the ecclesiastical and administrative jurisdiction of the nearby village of Nartë. The modern settlement of Zvërnec emerged only in later centuries along the shore of the lagoon, and it was only thereafter that the monastery became associated with this newer village by proximity.

Much of the complex most likely dates back to the 19th century.

The complex has been protected as a cultural monument since 1963.

== Gallery ==
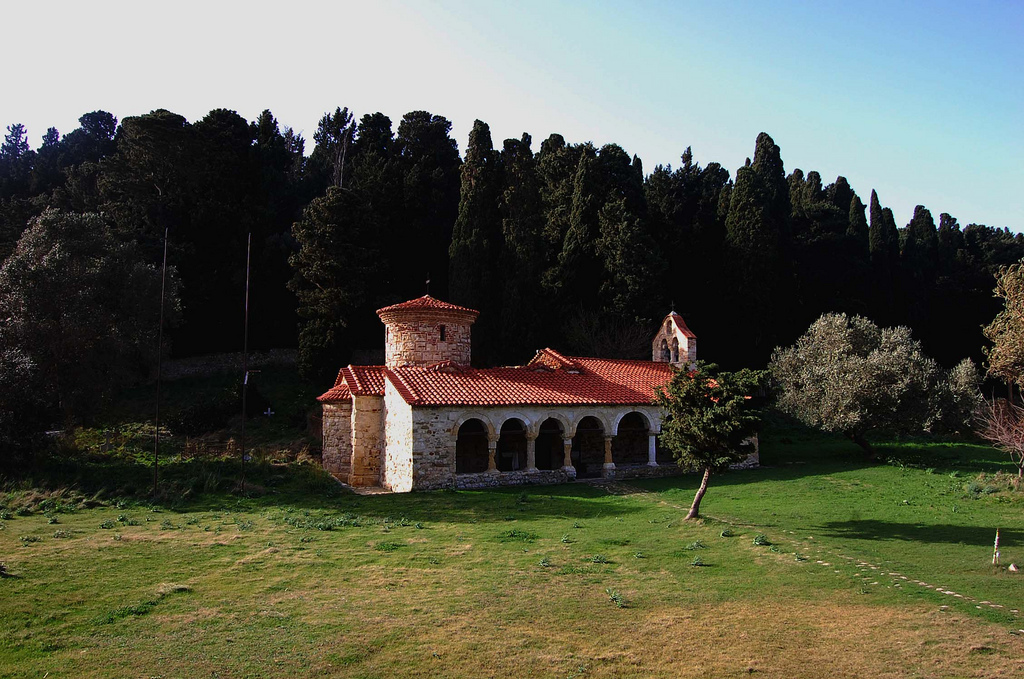

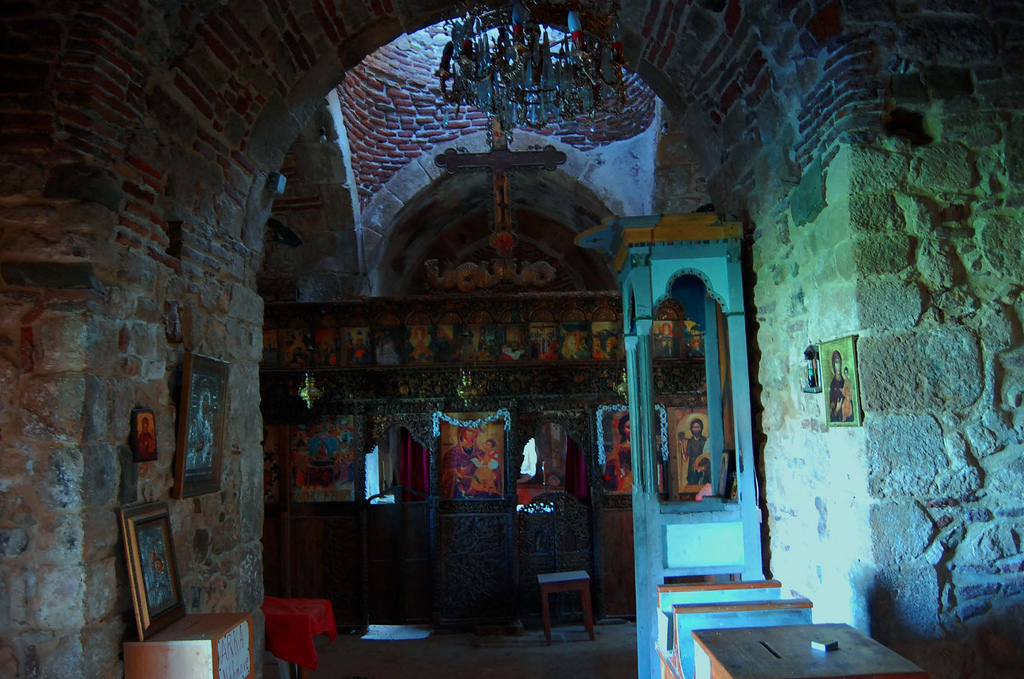

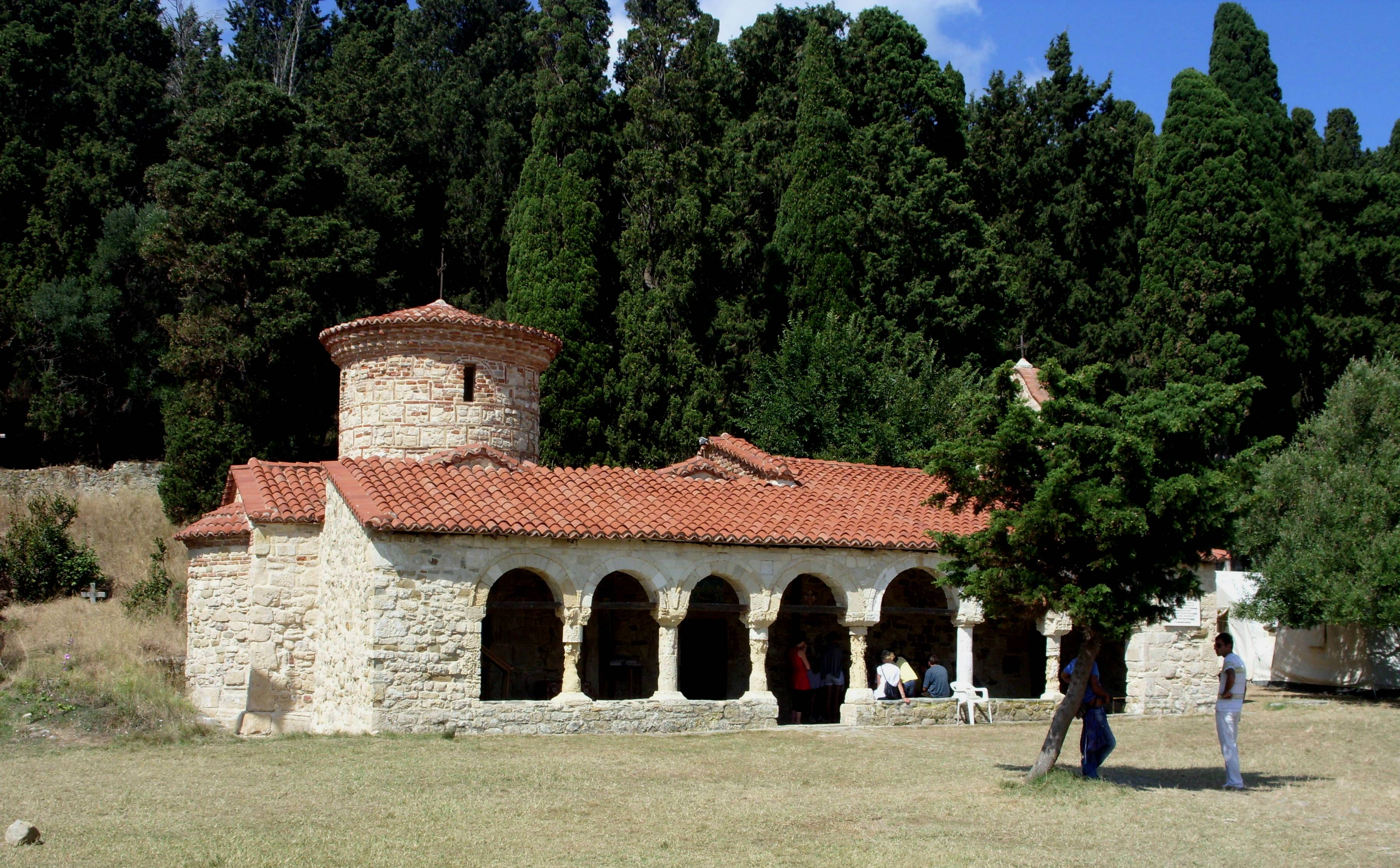

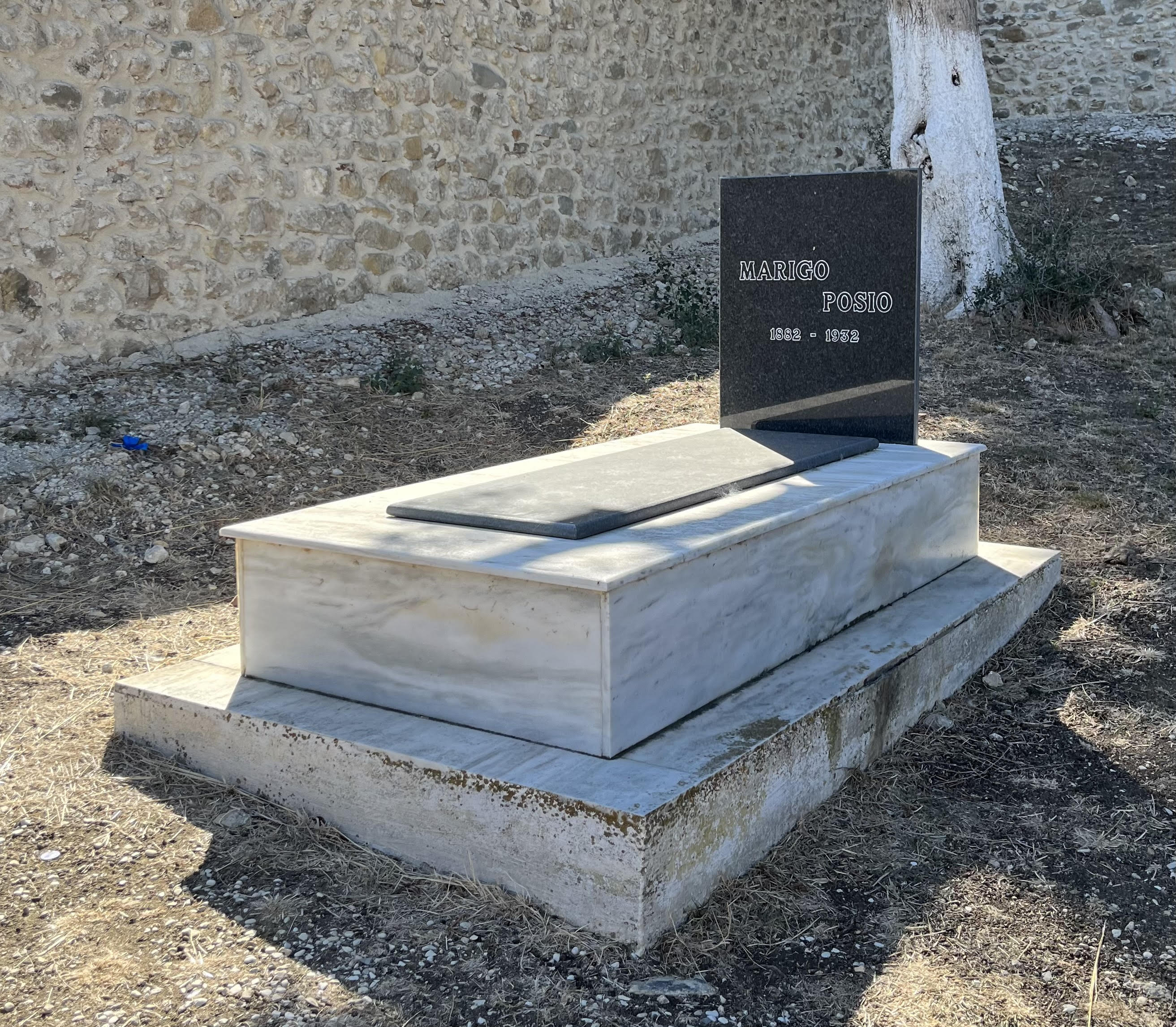

== See also ==
- Culture of Albania
- Architecture of Albania
- Byzantine churches in Albania
