= Besjana Guri =

Albanian social worker and environmental activist

- Born: Albania
- Occupations: Social worker; Environmental activist
- Organization(s): Founder and Executive Director, LUMI
- Awards: Goldman Environmental Prize 2025

Besjana Guri (born 1987 or 1988) is an Albanian social worker and environmental activist best known for her work as the Co-Founder and Communications Officer of EcoAlbania, where she worked in tandem with Executive Director Olsi Nika to protect the Vjosa. She is also the founder and executive director of LUMI, and through this has been a prominent activist for the Flamingo Revolution. Guri and Nika were jointly awarded the Goldman Prize for Europe in 2025.

== Biography ==
Guri was born and raised in Albania and graduated from the University of Tirana, where she earned a bachelor's degree in social work and a master's degree in community organization.

She co-founded EcoAlbania with Olsi Nika in 2014, where she became the Communications Officer. The organization set out to protect Albania's natural ecosystems. That same year, they launched the Save the Blue Heart of Europe campaign to protect the Vjosa from use in hydropower. Guri led the communication to both the public and the media, and informed local communities about development projects. As part of her effort against the hydropower, she has emphasized a diversity of sources of renewable energy.

They soon received national and international support. In November 2021, Guri and Nika brought in Patagonia, Inc. to help mediate between EcoAlbania and the government. Their efforts led to the Vjosa becoming the Vjosa Wild River National Park, protecting more than 31,000 acres of the river and its tributaries.

After the creation of the park, she shifted her focus to leading protests to protect the Vjosa's tributary Shushica from commercial use.

She jointly received the Goldman Prize for Europe in 2025 with Nika. She was also featured on Living on Earth in June 2025. That same July, she founded LUMI, otherwise known as the Movement for Water, Environment, and Integration, where she serves as executive director.

At LUMI, she was one of the first to raise alarms about the Sazan Island Resort and the damage it would cause to the Vjosa-Narta. She led early activism against that resort in the name of protecting the Vjosa-Narta, and has been an active participant and spokesperson for the subsequent Flamingo Revolution stemming from the resort.
