= Vjosa Wild River National Park =

National park in Albania

- Parku Kombëtar i Lumit të Egër “Vjosa”
- IUCN category II (national park)
- Official logo

- Location within Albania Location within Europe
- Location: Gjirokastër County
- Nearest town: Tepelenë
- Coordinates: 40°07′27″N 20°25′57″E
- Area: 12,727 ha (127.27 km^{2})
- Designated: 15 March 2023
- Governing body: National Agency of Protected Areas
- Website: parkukombetarvjosa.al

Vjosa Wild River National Park (Albanian: Parku Kombëtar i Lumit të Egër “Vjosa”) is a national park located in southern Albania. The Vjosa River is Europe's first Wild River National Park that was designated on 15 March 2023. The park was declared a natural ecosystem by decision of the Council of Ministers, in compliance with Law 81/2017 "On Protected Areas". The river valley is considered Albania's biodiversity hotspot, offering ideal aquatic habitats for over 1,100 species of wildlife, including otters, the endangered Egyptian vulture and the critically endangered Balkan lynx, of which only 15 are estimated to remain.

== Background ==
Vjosa was declared the first Wild River National Park in Europe in a ceremony organized in Tepelenë on 15 March 2023, with Albanian prime minister Edi Rama in attendance, which finalized a years long joint initiative by the Ministry of Tourism and Environment, in cooperation with Patagonia, the International Union for Conservation of Nature (IUCN), environmental organizations and other local NGOs. Besjana Guri and Olsi Nika were awarded the Goldman Prize jointly for their advocacy for the park's creation.

The Vjosa, from the source to its discharge into the Adriatic Sea – including its main tributaries (Drino, Kardhiq, Bënçë, Shushicë) – was given full national and transboundary protection in accordance with international standards, effectively being preserved as a living, free flowing wild river, for the benefit of the local population and its surrounding natural habitat.

In 2025, the park was designated as a biosphere reserve by UNESCO.

== Geography ==
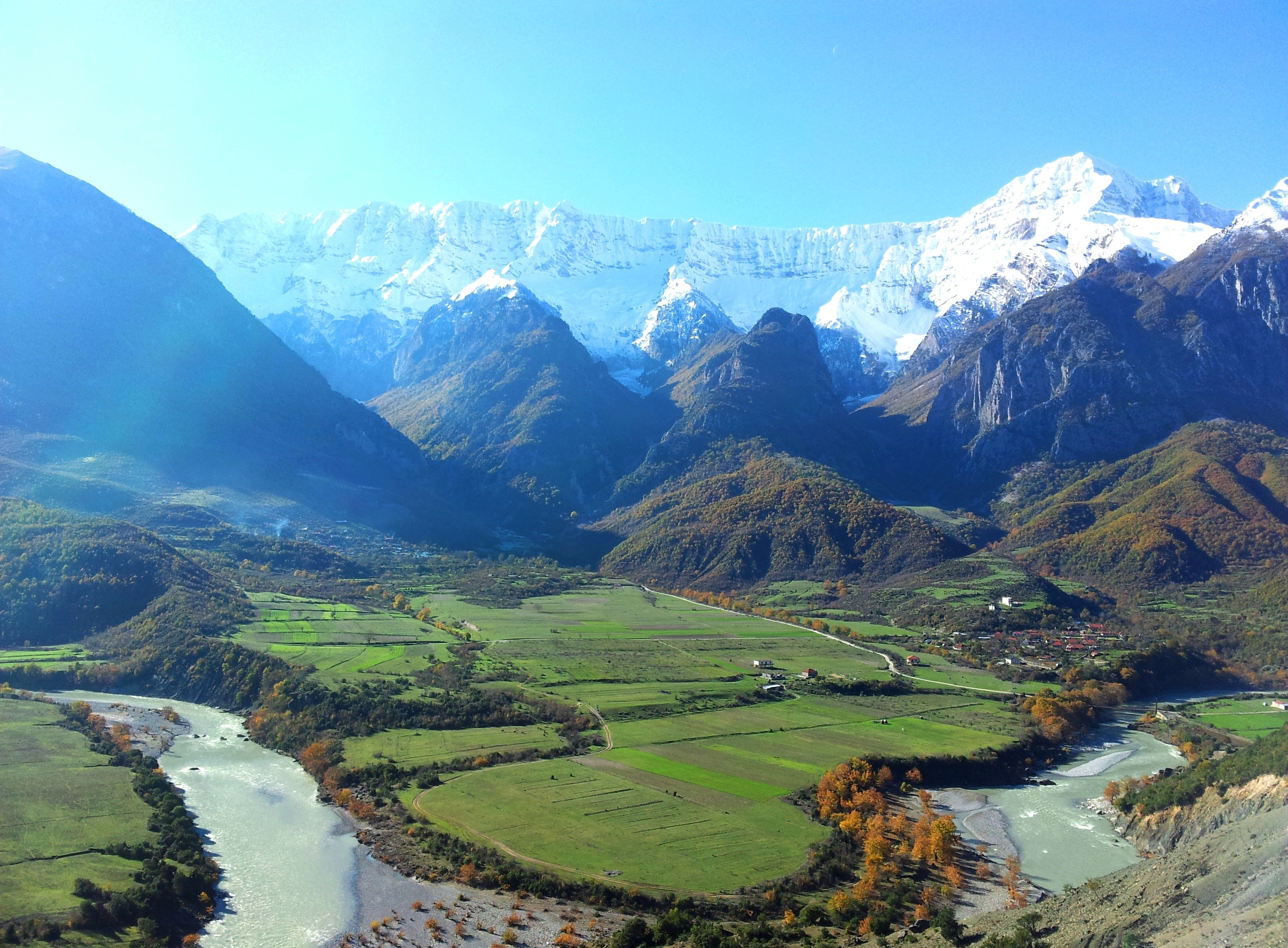
Vjosa river flowing around the Nemërçka mountain range with the village of Kanikol in the foreground.

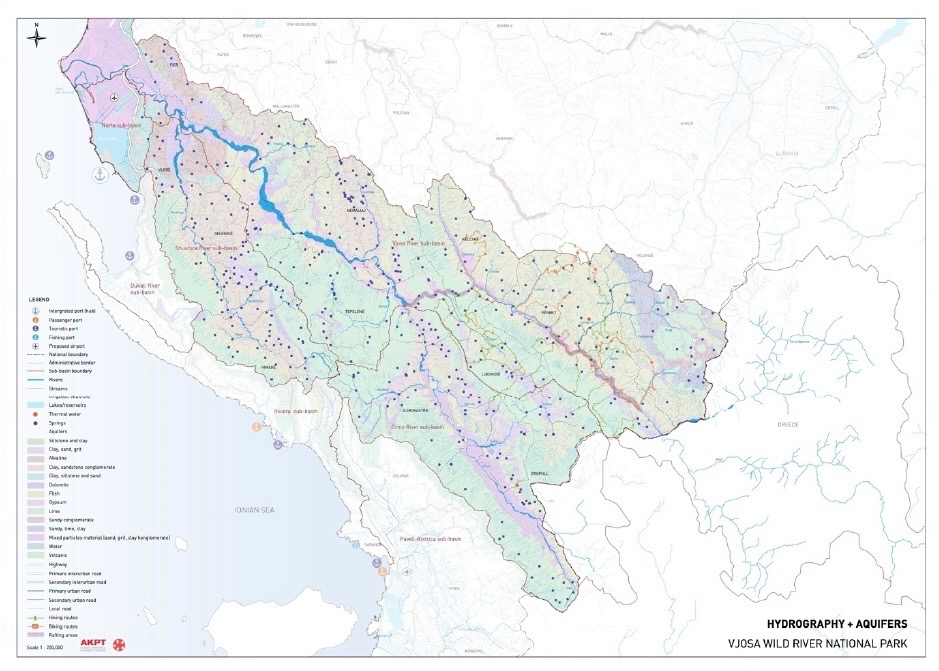
Hydrographic map of Vjosa Wild River National Park

Over a length of 270 km (170 mi); 190 km of which are located in Albania, the river flows naturally undisturbed through narrow canyons, rapids, islands and bends that create meanders with attractive landscapes.

The park as a whole has a combined surface area of 12,727 ha (127.27 km2) and has been granted an IUCN Category II designation aimed at protecting it from dams, gravel extraction and other damaging activities, ensuring its ecological integrity while allowing the natural processes to occur and supporting the population of its native species.

== Flora and fauna ==
The park is home to over 1,100 species of wildlife. There are 257 species of bird, 31 species of fish, 70 species of mammals and 150 species of winged insects that are found in the park, of which 13 are on the IUCN Red List of Threatened Species.

== See also ==
- List of national parks of Albania
