= Qendër Vlorë =

- Administrative unit
- Location within Albania
- Coordinates: 40°32′N 19°28′E
- Country: Albania
- County: Vlorë
- Municipality: Vlorë

Population (2011)
  - Administrative unit: 7,621
- Time zone: UTC+1 (CET)
  - Summer (DST): UTC+2 (CEST)

Qendër Vlorë is a former municipality in the Vlorë County, southwestern Albania. At the 2015 local government reform it became a subdivision of the municipality Vlorë. The population at the 2011 census was 7,621. The municipal unit consists of the villages Bestrovë, Babicë e Madhe, Babicë e Vogël, Hoshtimë, Kaninë, Kërkovë, Nartë, Sherishtë, Panaja, Xhyherinë, Zvërnec and Sazan Island. Nartë and Zvërnec are predominantly Greek-speaking settlements.
