= Babicë e Madhe =

Village in Albania

- Village
- Interactive map of Babicë e Madhe
- Coordinates: 40°29′1″N 19°30′53″E
- Country: Albania
- County: Vlorë
- Municipality: Vlorë
- Administrative unit: Qendër
- Elevation: 48 m (157 ft)
- Time zone: UTC+1 (CET)
  - Summer (DST): UTC+2 (CEST)
- Postal code: 9423

Babicë e Madhe (also spelled Babica e Madhe) is a village in the Qendër administrative unit, part of the Vlorë Municipality, in Vlorë County, Albania.

== Geography ==
Babica e Madhe lies at approximately 48 metres (157 ft) above sea level.

== Location and surroundings ==
It is situated within Vlorë County and the Qendër municipal unit, which according to the 2011 census had a population of 7,621 and includes Babicë e Madhe among other villages. Babicë a e Madhe is located about 3.7 km northeast of the centre of Vlorë. Notable nearby places include the historic Muradie Mosque (~2.5 km away) and the Walls of Ancient Aulon (~3 km away).

== Administrative context ==
Babicë e Madhe forms part of the Qendër administrative unit, which was established following the enactment of Law No. 115/2014. This reform reorganized Albania into 12 counties and 61 municipalities, abolishing the former system of municipalities and communes.

== See also ==
- Qendër, Vlorë
