= Sazan Island Resort =

Proposed project in Albania

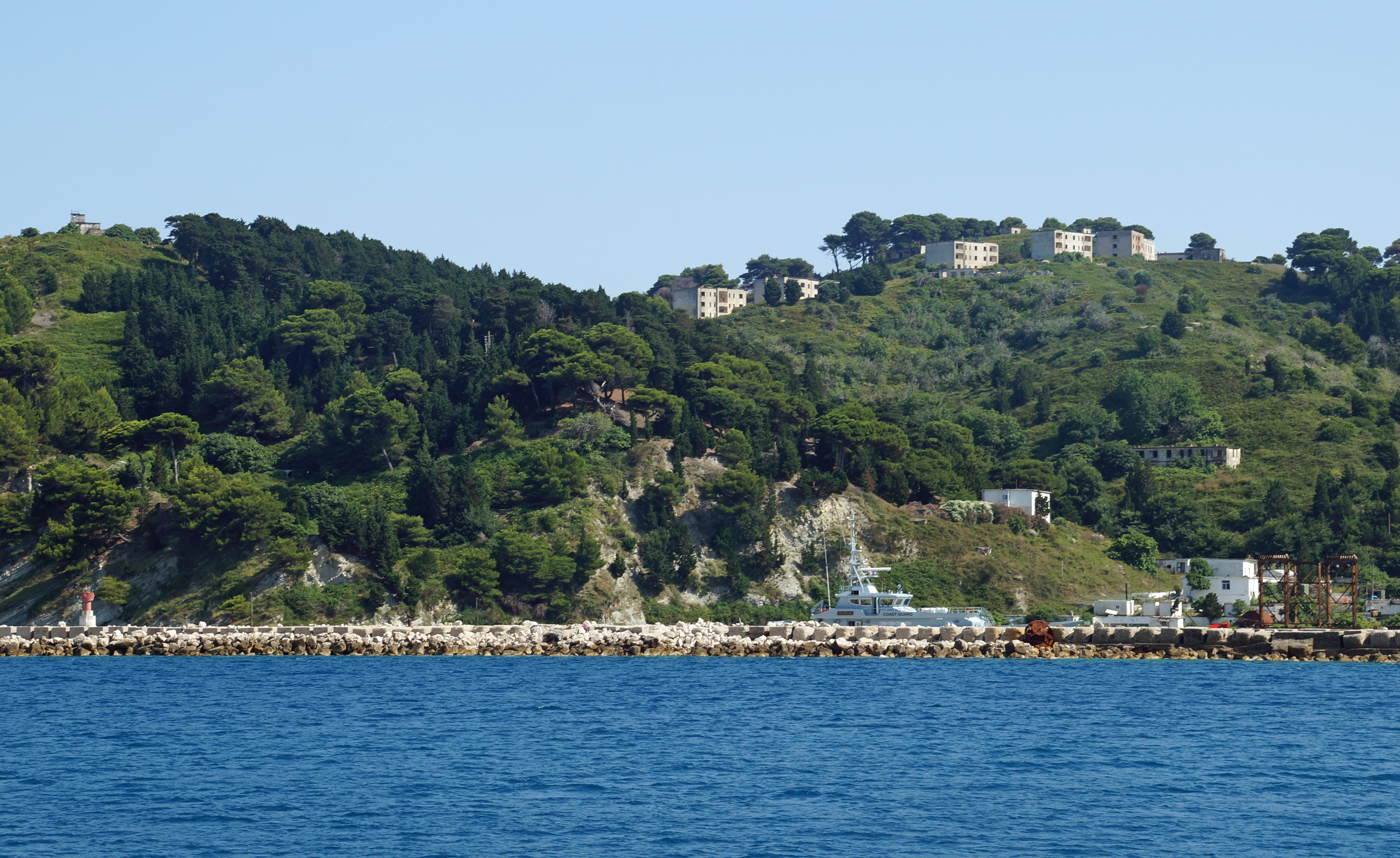
- Sazan Island – port and old apartment buildings

General information
- Status: Proposed
- Location: Sazan Island, Albania
- Cost: €1.4 billion

Design and construction
- Developer: Atlantic Incubation Partners LLC (backed by Jared Kushner)
- Known for: Sparking protests in Albania

Sazan Island Resort is a proposed luxury tourism development project located on Sazan Island, in the protected coastal area of Zvërnec (near Vlorë), Albania. Backed by American investor, United States special envoy, and US president Donald Trump's son-in-law Jared Kushner, the project is valued at approximately €1.4 billion and is expected to transform the decommissioned military island into a high-end eco-resort. In the coastal protected area, characterized by ecologically sensitive lagoons and swamps, the plan provides for an investment of approximately $4.7 billion. Thousands of Albanians have been protesting against the development, in a series of protests known as the Flamingo Revolution.

== Background ==
Sazan Island, a strategic site in the Ionian Sea, has a surface area of 5.7 km^{2} (2.2 sq mi). It is 4.8 km (3.0 mi) long and 2 km (1.2 mi) wide, and its coastline measures about 15 km (9.3 mi). It is the largest island in Albania. The island was mentioned by Pseudo-Scylax in his Periplus.

The island was used as a military base throughout the 20th century by Italian, Soviet, and Albanian forces. After World War II, in 1947, the Paris Peace Treaty transferred sovereignty over the island to Albania. During the Cold War, communist Albania became known as Europe's North Korea due to the extreme paranoia of dictator Enver Hoxha, who used the island as a lookout point for a believed attack from NATO or members of the Warsaw Pact. By the 1970s, there were about 150 military families who lived on the island without contact to the mainland, with the island hosting a military base, theatre, school, and hospital. A reporter who visited the island in July 2024, recounted touring the island, which houses about 16 kilometres (10 mi) of tunnels, about 3,600 bunkers, and unexploded ordnances that were dropped when the island and its military base were looted in the 1990s.

In December 2024, the Albanian government declassified the island for civilian use. In 2010, 2,721.87 hectares (6,725.9 acres) of the island's surrounding marine area was designated as the Karaburun-Sazan Marine Park. The coastal protected area, named Narta Lagoon, is one of the most important wetlands of the Balkans, known for its salt pans, wild beaches, and extraordinary biodiversity, sheltering hundreds of species of migratory birds, including pink flamingos.

== Development ==
The resort is being planned by Atlantic Incubation Partners LLC, affiliated with Kushner’s private equity firm Affinity Partners. The project was awarded "Strategic Investor" status by the Albanian government, allowing for expedited permits and incentives. The purchase price of Sazan Island was reportedly $1.4 billion USD with an included $4.7 billion agreement on part of the protected coastal landscape of Zvërnec. The island's purchase was preliminarily approved in January 2025, about two months after US president Trump, Kushner's father-in-law, was elected for a second term, and days before he was inaugurated. Both Kushner and the Albanian Government have stated that Trump and Kushner's connection and prior position in his cabinet did not influence the sale of the island or approval of the project. While speaking about the project, Kushner's wife Ivanka Trump claimed that they had discovered and fallen in love with the island and surrounding areas after they had stopped near the island while vacationing on a friend's boat and swum to it to explore and hike.

Since the beginning of the works, with the first deforestation and barbed wire fences to limit access to the area, the ascertained damage is already irreversible for the delicate ecosystem, including: the destruction of the millennial dunes of Zvërnec; the interruption of the water exchange of the Narta Lagoon; and the fragmentation of the migratory corridor (Adriatic Flyway).

On 1 June 2026, the Albanian Special Prosecution Office Against Corruption and Organized Crime (SPAK) confirmed that they had opened an investigation into the projected changes in the island's protected status and land ownership. The investigation aims to shed light on the controversial legislative amendments adopted in 2024 that have changed the status of protected areas, allowing real estate development, and on the funds and methods of land acquisition that took place without regular tenders. Also, although the Albanian government claims that the land concerned is privately owned and acquired in a transparent manner, legal disputes and complaints have arisen for the overlapping of claims and property rights, following the chaotic post-communist privatization.

=== Related projects ===
The Sazan Island Resort is part of a broader regional investment initiative by Kushner, which was set to include a planned luxury retreat in Zvernec, Albania and urban redevelopment projects in Belgrade, Serbia. In December 2025, it was reported that the Affinity Partners had withdrawn their planned $500 million hotel construction project in Belgrade and the plan to build a luxury complex over the General Staff buildings that had been destroyed during NATO bombing in 1999, had been scrapped. The report came hours after Serbia's Prosecutors Office for Organized Crime filed an indictment against Cultural Minister Nikola Selaković for allegedly illegally removing the buildings' cultural heritage status.

== Impact ==
The investment is projected to potentially inject €1.4 billion into the Albanian economy, create approximately 1,000 jobs during construction and operation, and position Albania as a high-end Mediterranean destination.

Environmentalists including Goldman Prize winner Besjana Guri have expressed concern over the ecological impact. Sazan Island lies within the Karaburun-Sazan National Marine Park and is home to rare marine and bird species. Critics argue that the resort could harm biodiversity and marine habitats. While speaking to Albanian lawmakers in early June 2026, Albanian prime minister Edi Rama denied that the project would encroach on the protected wildlife reserve and that a final proposal had yet to be submitted and the environmental study had not been completed.

== Protests ==
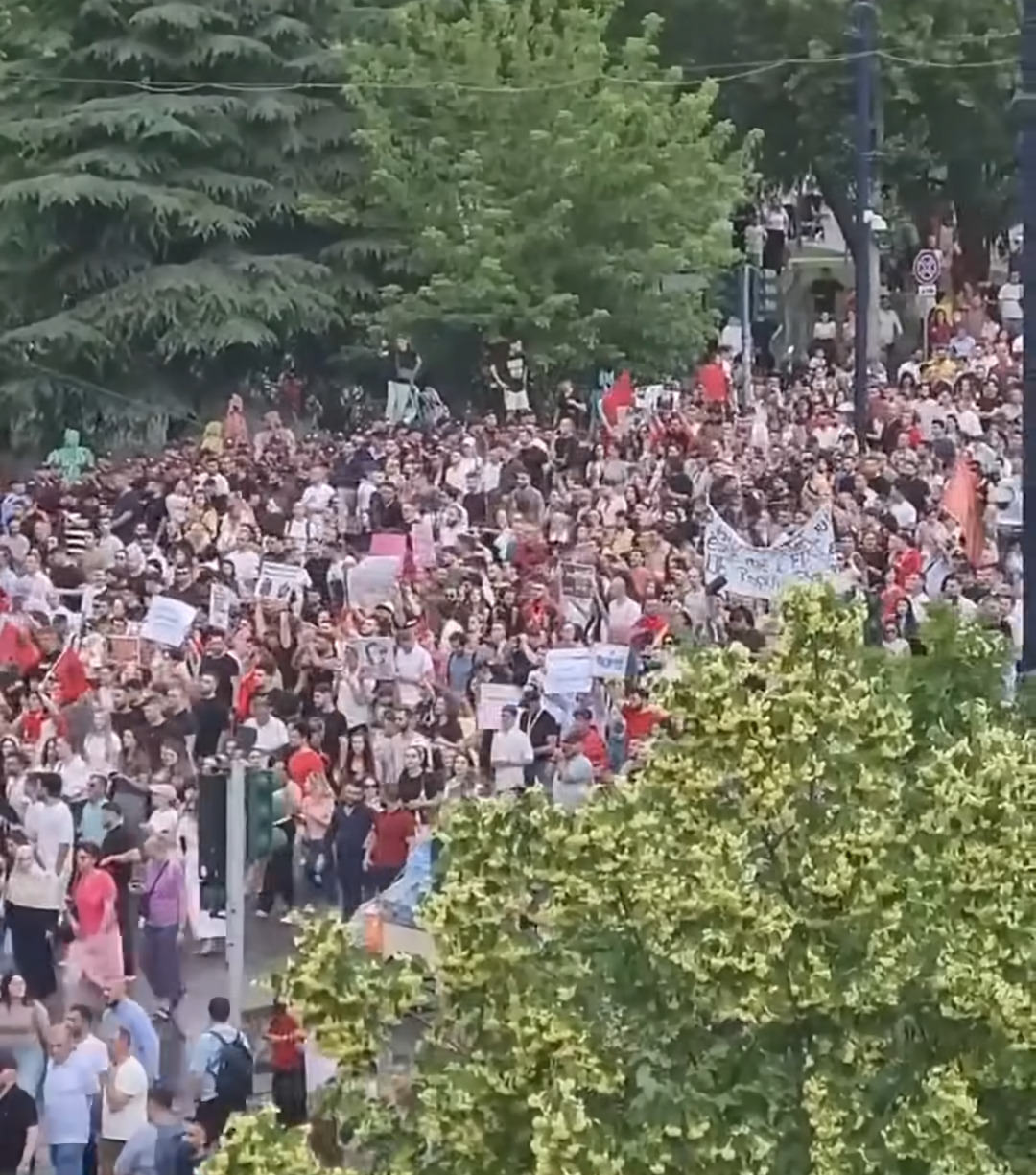
A 2026 protest in Albania against the proposed project

In late May 2026, protesters, including citizens and environmental organizations, protested outside the government offices and demanded an end to the project, protection of the area from development and resignation of the prime minister, with another protest scheduled in Tirana about a week later. Footage from the protest a day before appears to show private security guards assaulting and dragging a protester along a cliff, while threatening other protesters who had attempted to remove fences and halt construction. Two private security companies had their licenses revoked due to the actions recorded during the protest, with the General Director of the State Police, Skënder Hita, announcing an investigation into the conduct of the private security.

== See also ==
- Tourism in Albania
- Albanian Riviera
