= Babicë e Vogël =

Village in Albania

- Village
- Interactive map of Babicë e Vogël
- Coordinates: 40°29′55.4″N 19°30′9.3″E
- Country: Albania
- County: Vlorë
- Municipality: Vlorë
- Administrative unit: Qendër
- Elevation: 48 m (157 ft)
- Demonym(s): Babiciot; Babiciotët
- Time zone: UTC+1 (CET)
  - Summer (DST): UTC+2 (CEST)
- Postal code: 9423

Babicë e Vogël (also spelled Babica e Vogël) is a village in the Qendër administrative unit, part of the Vlorë Municipality, in Vlorë County, Albania.

== History and administrative context ==
Following the enactment of Law No. 115/2014, Albania was reorganized into 12 counties and 61 municipalities, each containing one or more administrative units. The reform abolished the former system of municipalities and communes, replacing it with the current structure. The law entered into force 15 days after publication in the Official Gazette, and the new territorial divisions were first applied in the 2015 local elections.

== Geography and infrastructure ==
Babicë e Vogël lies at an elevation of about 48 metres above sea level. It is assigned the postal code 9423.

== Local governance and finances ==
According to municipal records, Babicë e Vogël falls under local fee category VI, with an amount set at 2,400 in the local tariff system.

== See also ==
- Qendër, Vlorë
