= Zvërnec Island =

Island in Albania

Native name: Ishulli i Zvërnecit
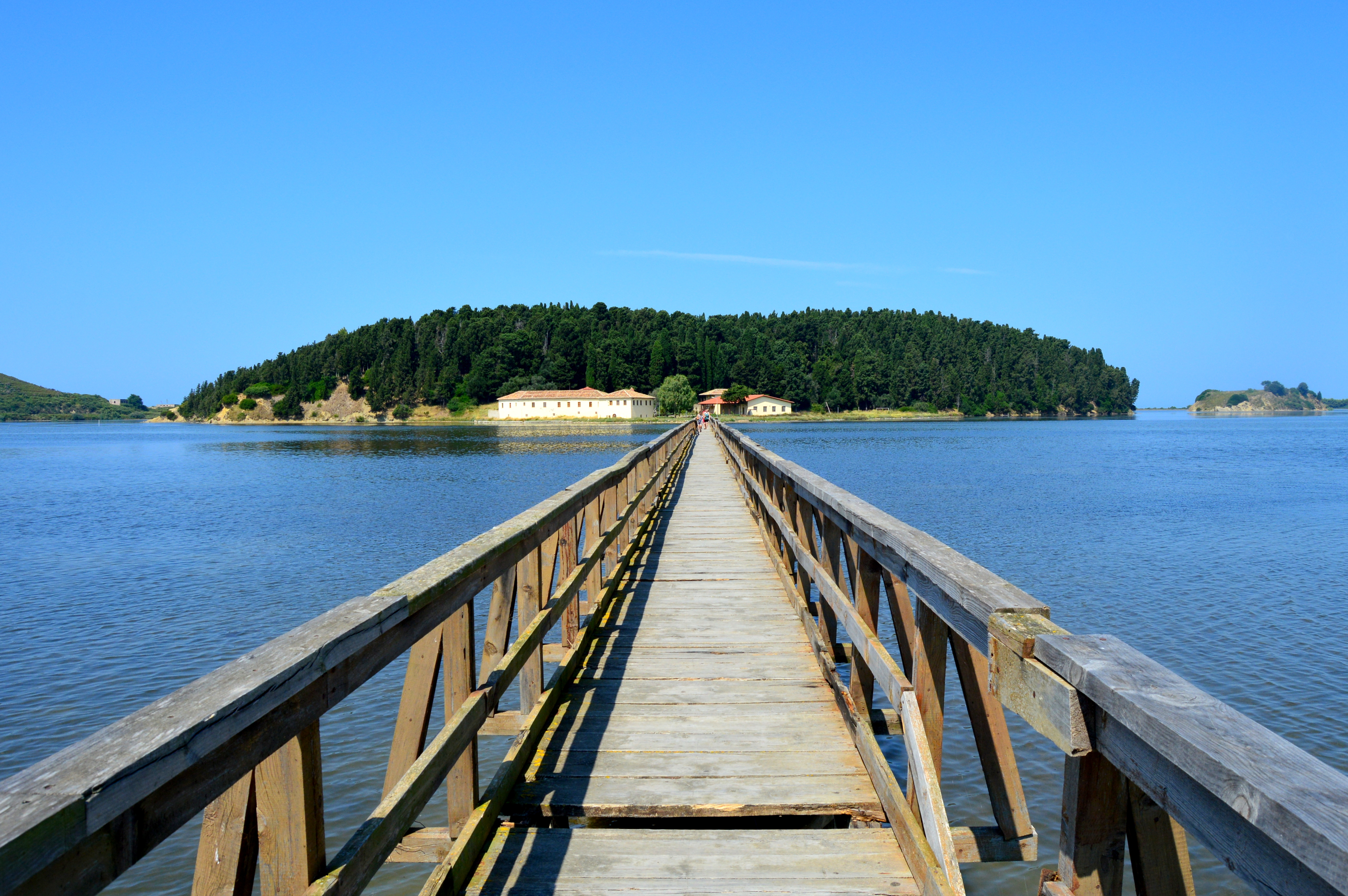
- Zvërnec Island
- Interactive map of Zvërnec Island

Geography
- Location: Narta Lagoon, Adriatic Sea
- Coordinates: 40°31′02″N 19°24′06″E
- Area: 0.09 km^{2} (0.035 sq mi)
- Length: 0.43 km (0.267 mi)
- Width: 0.30 km (0.186 mi)
- Highest elevation: 25 m (82 ft)

Administration
- Albania

Zvërnec Island is an island within the Narta Lagoon in southern Albania.

The island is nearly all covered with tall pine trees and is just east of a much smaller island. It is 430m in length and has a maximum width of 300m. Zvërnec Island is connected to the mainland by a 270m long wooden bridge.

The island is a tourist attraction because it contains the well preserved 13th-14th century Byzantine Zvërnec Monastery. Located nearby is the village of Zvërnec, from which the island derives its name. The island has an area about 9 hectares.

Historically, the island’s St. Mary's Monastery, Zvërnec was under the ecclesiastical jurisdiction of nearby Nartë, as the present-day village of Zvërnec did not yet exist when the monastery was founded; today both Nartë and Zvërnec belong to the Qendër Vlorë administrative unit of Vlorë Municipality. The monastery complex has been protected as a Cultural Monument since 1963.

== Zvërnec Monastery ==
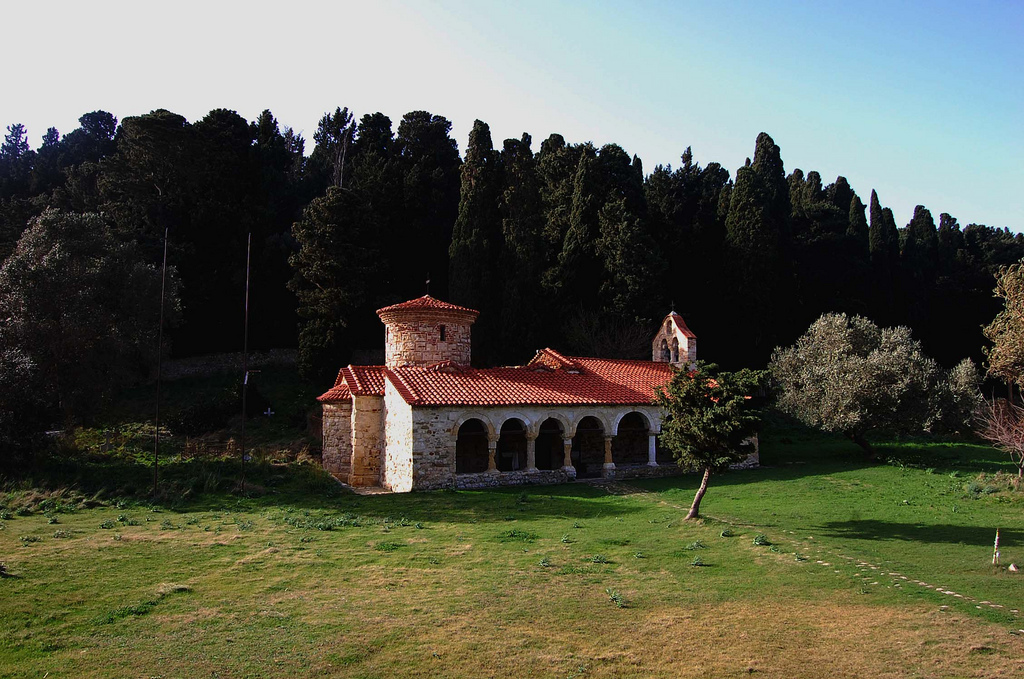
Zvernec Monastery

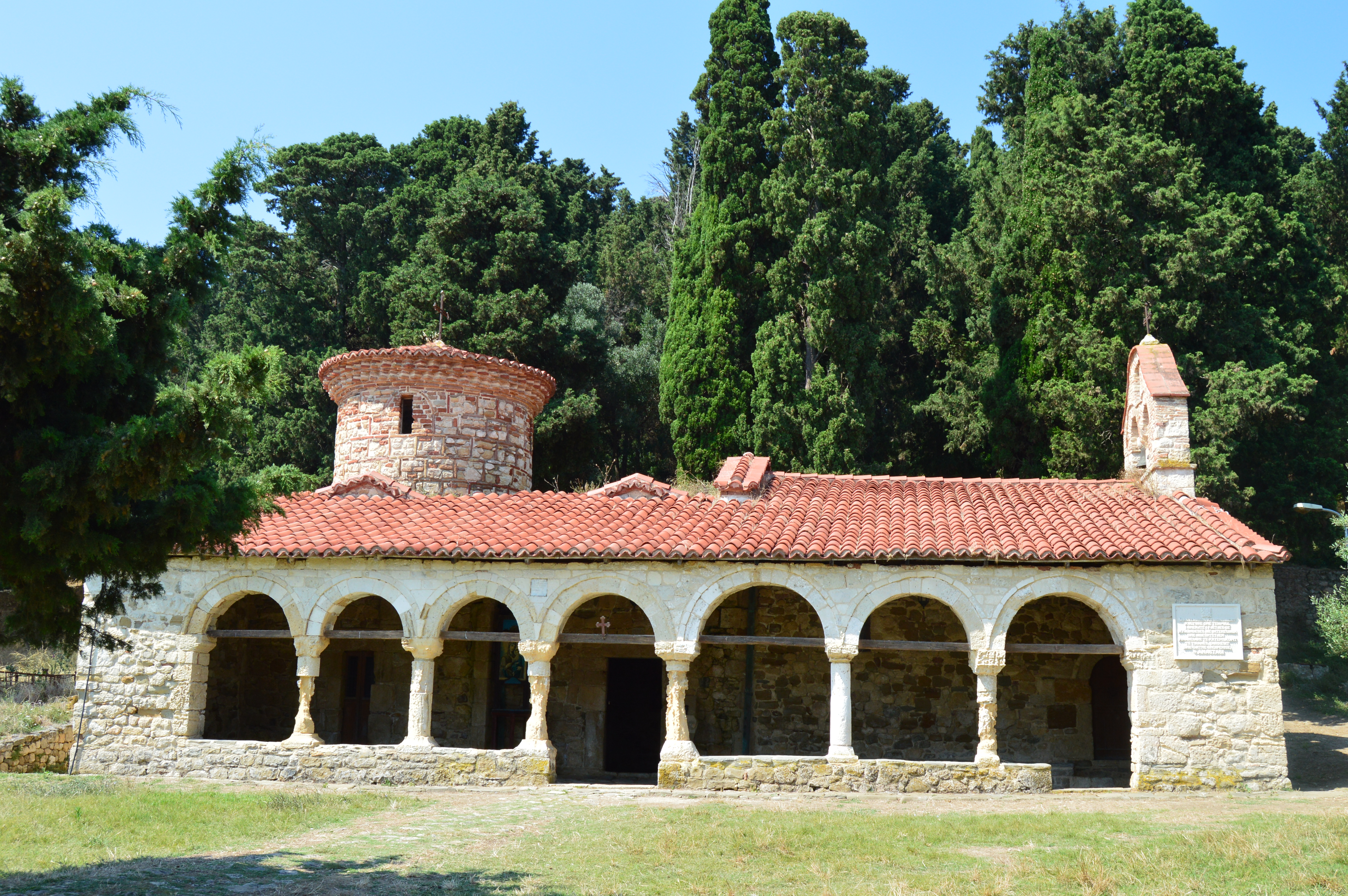

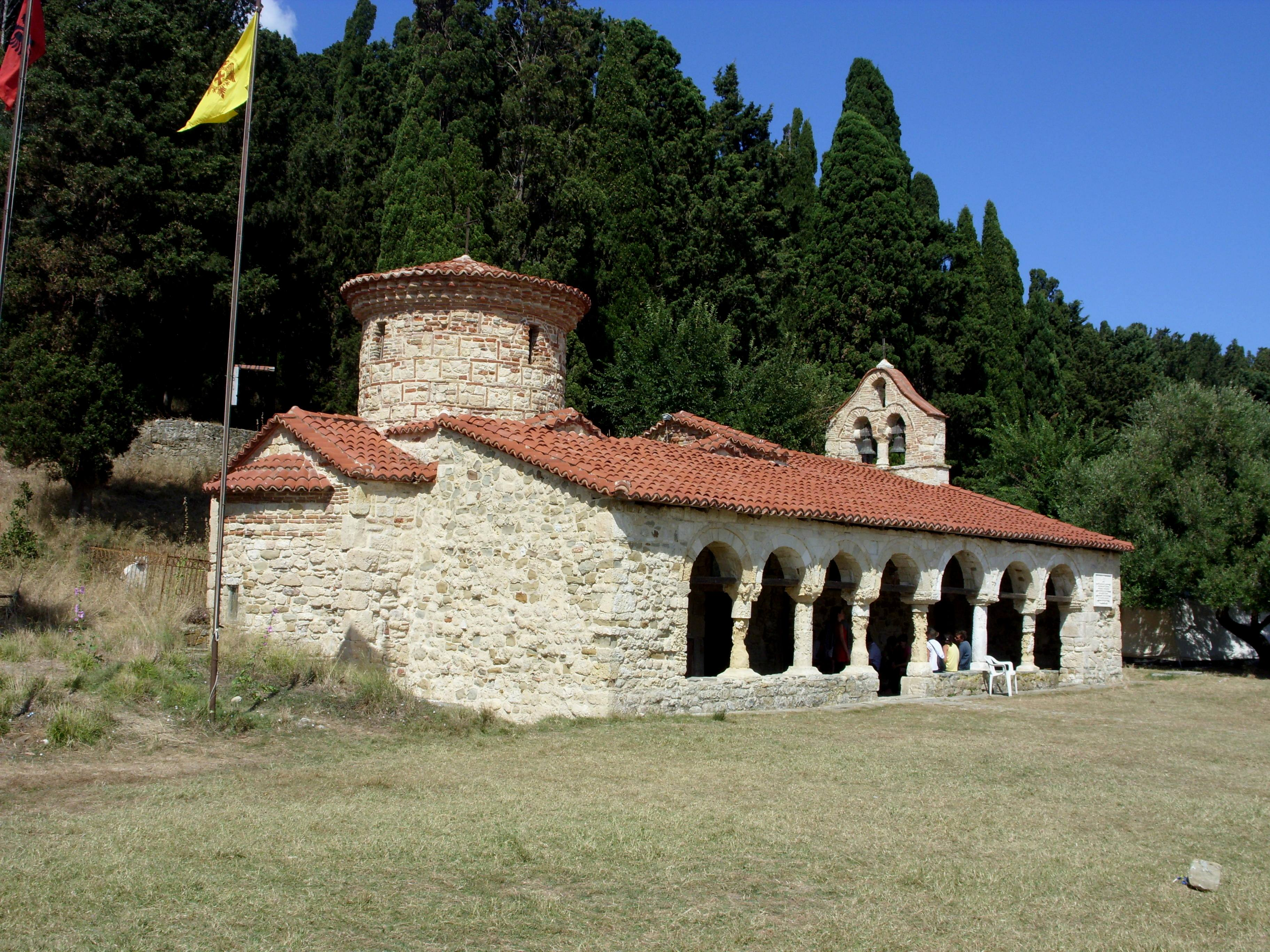

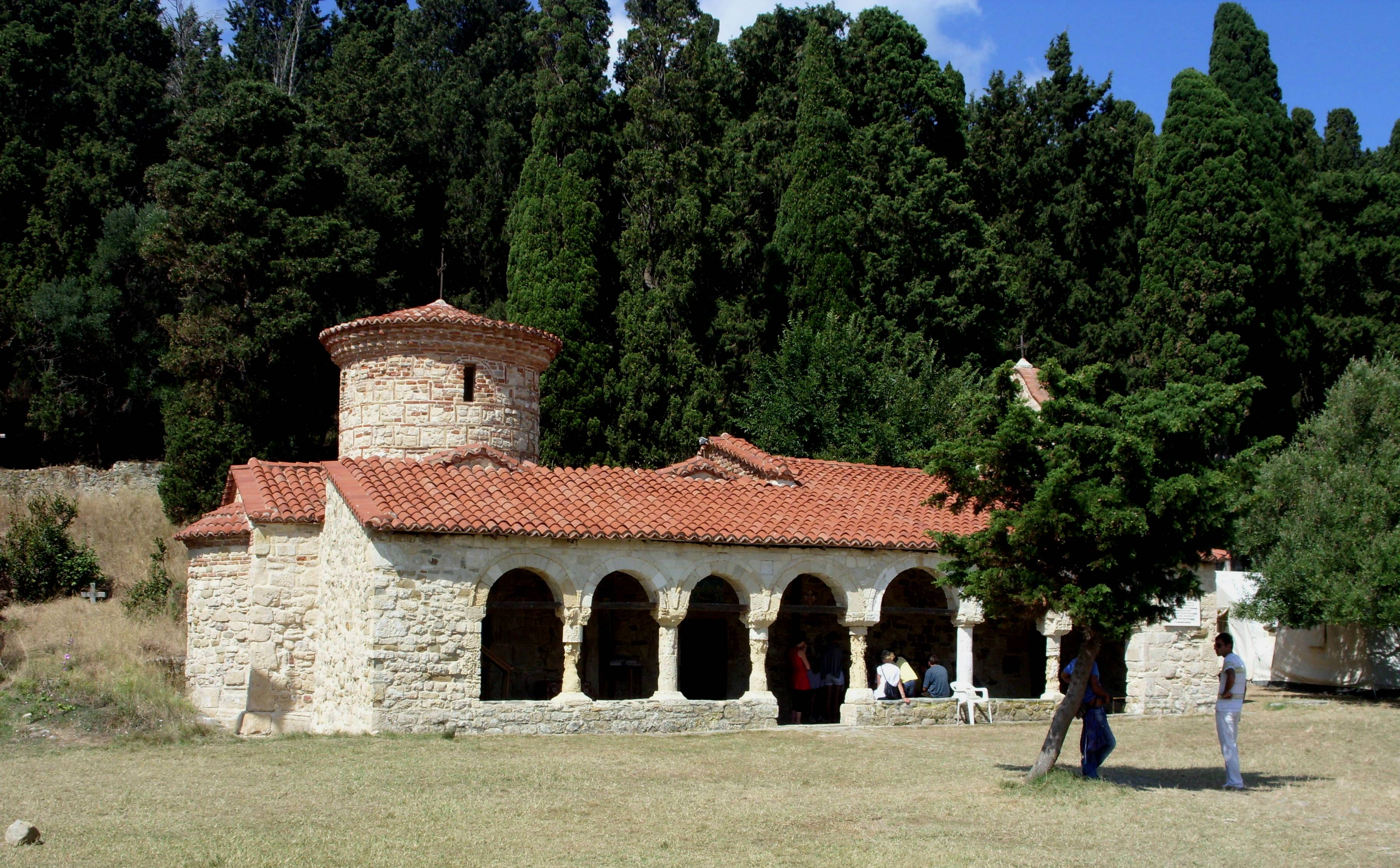

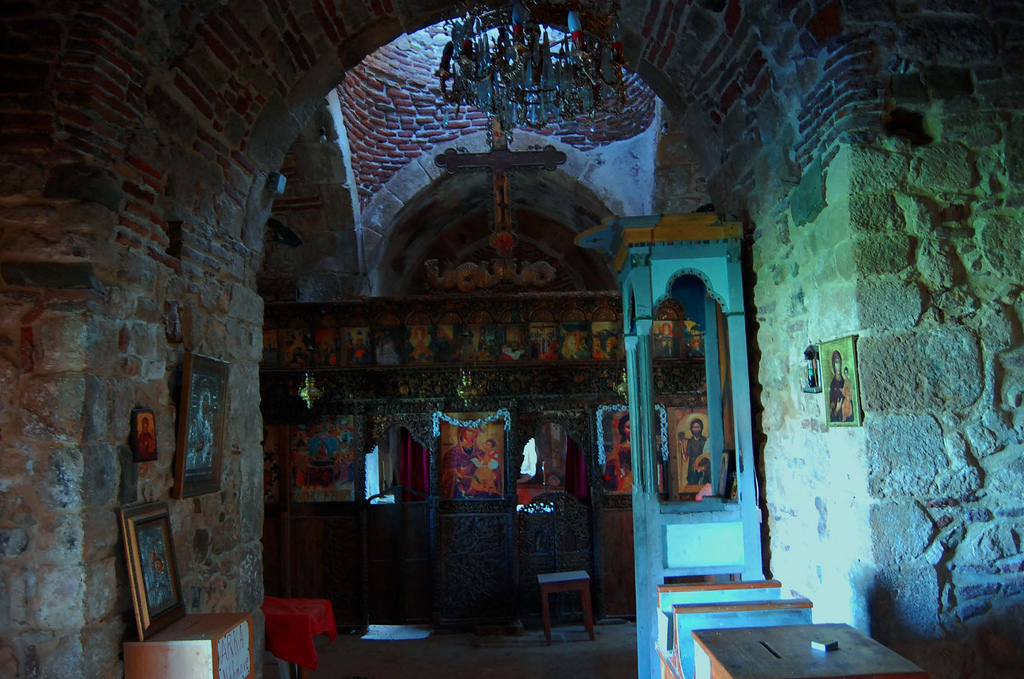

== See also ==
- Tourism in Albania
- Albanian Riviera
- Geography of Albania
