= Drino =

River in southern Albania and northwestern Greece

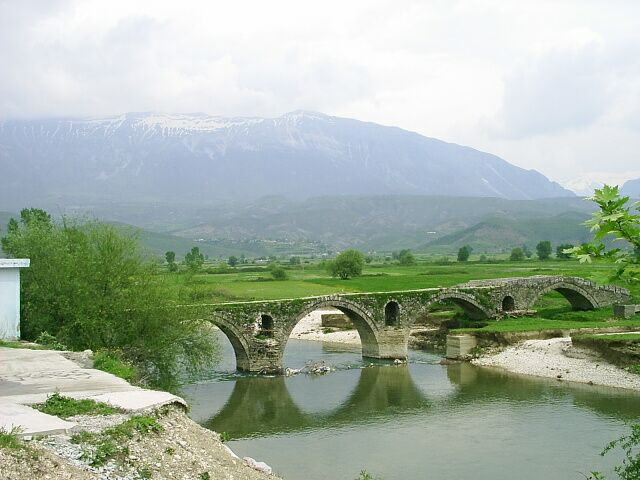
- Drino River

Location
- Countries: Albania and Greece

Physical characteristics
- Source
  - location: Ioannina regional unit, Greece
- Mouth
  - location: Vjosë
  - coordinates: 40°17′12″N 20°2′32″E
- Length: 84.6 km (52.6 mi)
- Basin size: 1,320 km^{2} (510 sq mi)

Basin features
- Progression: Vjosë→ Adriatic Sea

The Drino or Drinos (Albanian: Drino, Greek: Δρίνος) is a river in southern Albania and northwestern Greece, and a tributary of the Vjosë. Its source is in the northwestern part of the Ioannina regional unit, near the village Delvinaki. The 84.6 km (52.6 mi) long Drino flows initially southwest, then northwest and crosses the Albanian border near Ktismata. It continues northwest through Gjirokastër and flows into the Vjosë near Tepelenë.

== Etymology ==
The Albanian name of the river is Drino and the Greek name is Δρίνος, Drinos. The name of the river contains the root Drin-, which is considered to be of Illyrian origin and is encountered also in the northern Albanian river Drin (cf. also Drina between Bosnia and Herzegovina and Serbia).

== See also ==
- List of rivers of Albania
- List of rivers of Greece
