= Vjosa =

River in northwestern Greece and southwestern Albania

Vjosa Αώος (Aoös)
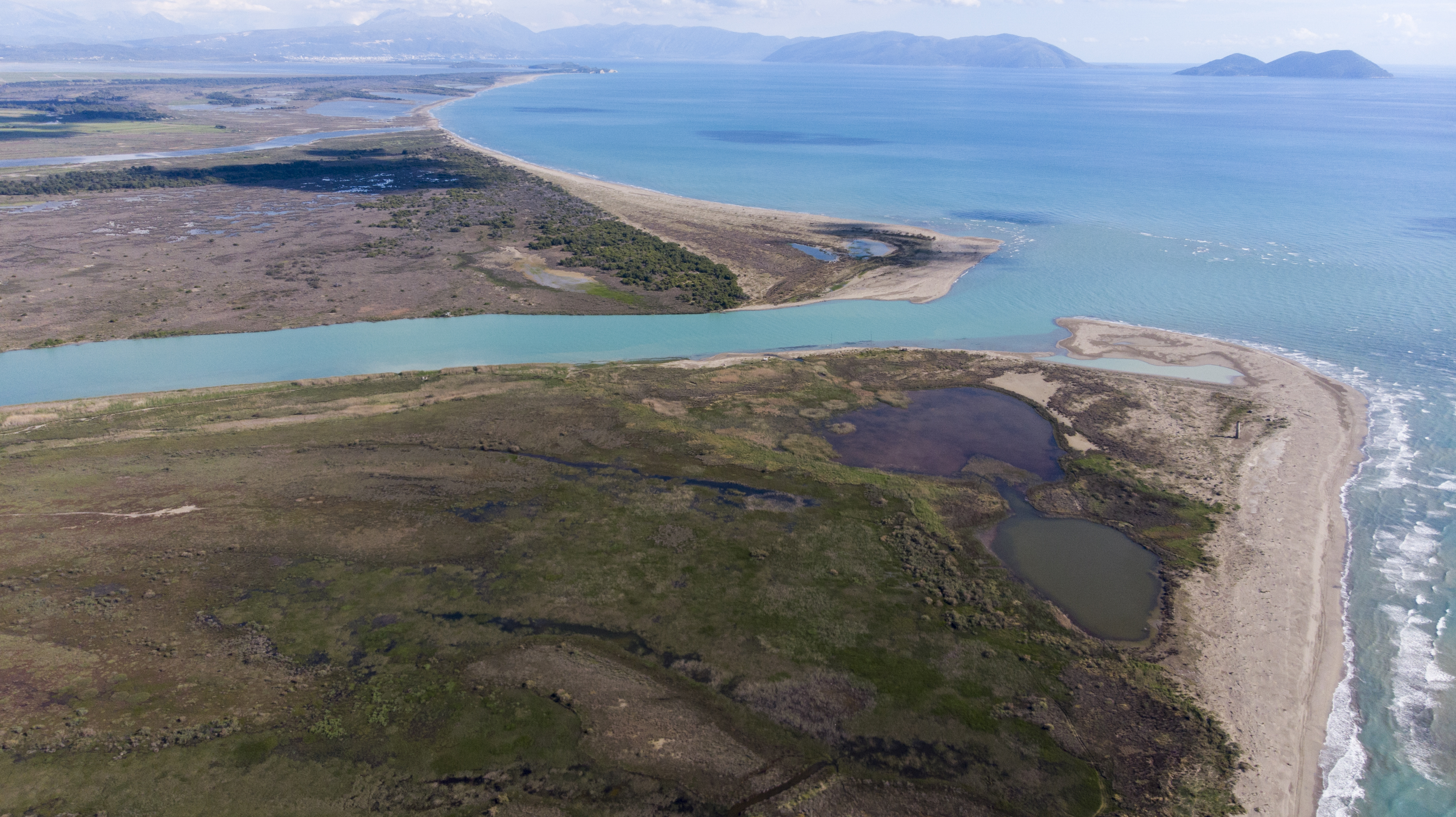
- Mouth of Vjosa discharging into the Adriatic

Location
- Countries: Albania and Greece

Physical characteristics
- Source
  - location: Pindus, Greece
- Mouth
  - location: Adriatic Sea, Albania
  - coordinates: 40°38′34″N 19°19′2″E
  - elevation: 0 m (0 ft)
- Length: 272 kilometres (169 mi)
- Basin size: 6,700 km^{2} (2,600 sq mi)
- Discharge
  - average: 195 m^{3}/s (6,900 cu ft/s)

The Vjosa (Albanian: [ˈvjɔsa]; indefinite form: Vjosë) or Aoös (Greek: Αώος) is a river in southwestern Albania and northwestern Greece. Its total length is about 272 kilometres (169 mi), of which the first 80 kilometres (50 mi) are in Greece, and the remaining 192 kilometres (119 mi) in Albania. Its drainage basin is 6,706 km^{2} (2,589 sq mi) and its average discharge is 195 m^{3}/s (6,900 cu ft/s). The main tributaries are Voidomatis, Sarantaporos, Drino and Shushicë.

The river arises in the Pindus mountains of Epirus, Greece, and generally flows northwest. It enters Albania near Çarshovë, and empties into the Adriatic Sea just north of Vlorë. Generally wild and unpolluted, the river is surrounded by the Vikos–Aoös National Park in Greece, and the Vjosa-Narta Protected Landscape near its mouth. In December 2020, the Albanian portion of the river was designated a "Managed Nature Reserve" by the government. A campaign by the environmentalist groups to designate the whole Albanian part of the course a national park, to guard against the prospective hydroelectric projects, ultimately resulted in the creation of the Vjosa Wild River National Park on 15 March 2023.

== Etymology ==
The Vjosa is known by a number of different names. In antiquity it was called Aoös (Ἄωος, Ἀῶος, Ἀῷος) in Greek (e.g. in Eratosthenes' Geography), and Aous in Latin. In Albanian it is called Vjosë or Vjosa, while in Greece it is known by its ancient name (Αώος in modern orthography), in medieval Latin maps was called Viossa as well as Vovousa (Βοβούσα) or Aias (Αίας, Αἴας). In Greek it is also known as Βοϊούσα (Voioussa, pronounced vo-i-usa), especially in pre-20th century texts. According to historian Ap. Vakalopoulos (1977) the name Voioussa is the common Greek name of Aoos.

Vjosa is also a common female Albanian given name.

== Course ==
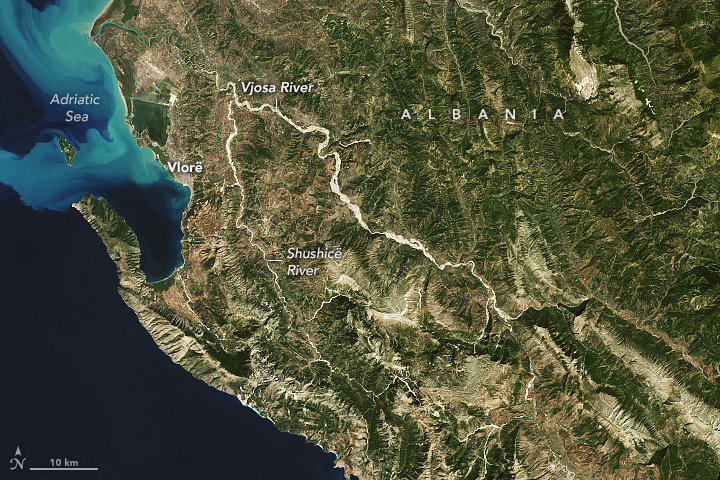
Satellite image of the Vjosa

The river arises in the Pindus mountains of Epirus, Greece, near the village of Vovousa. An artificial lake has been constructed at an elevation of 1,350 metres (4,430 ft), where a hydroelectric dam has been in place since 1987. It flows through the canyons of Vikos–Aoös National Park, and then through the town of Konitsa, where it is joined by the Voidomatis. It enters Albania near the villages of Vllaho-Psilloterë and Molyvdoskepastos, where it is joined by the Sarantaporos on the Greek–Albanian border, and then continues northwest through Përmet, Këlcyrë, and Tepelenë (where it is joined by the Drino), Memaliaj, Selenicë and Novoselë. It then flows into the Adriatic Sea northwest of Vlorë. The river's mouth is located within the boundaries of the Vjosa-Narta Protected Landscape. In December 2020, the Albanian portion of the Vjosa was designated a "Managed Nature Reserve" by the government.

The main tributaries of Vjosa are the Voidomatis, Sarantaporos, Drino, and Shushicë.

The main cities and towns along the river are, in downstream order, Vovousa and Konitsa in Greece; and Çarshovë, Përmet, Këlcyrë, Tepelenë, Memaliaj, Selenicë and Novoselë in Albania.

== Antiquity ==
The valley of the Vjosa has provided one of the most important natural routes between the mountainous interior of Epirus into southern Illyria and towards the Adriatic Sea. This natural route must have been used for millennia, and continues to be used to the present day. Hecataeus (550–476 BC) refers to the river as Aias (Ancient Greek: Αἴας), the name Anios (Ἄνιος) is used by Plutarch in Caesar, while Polybius, Livy and Strabo use the term Aoös.

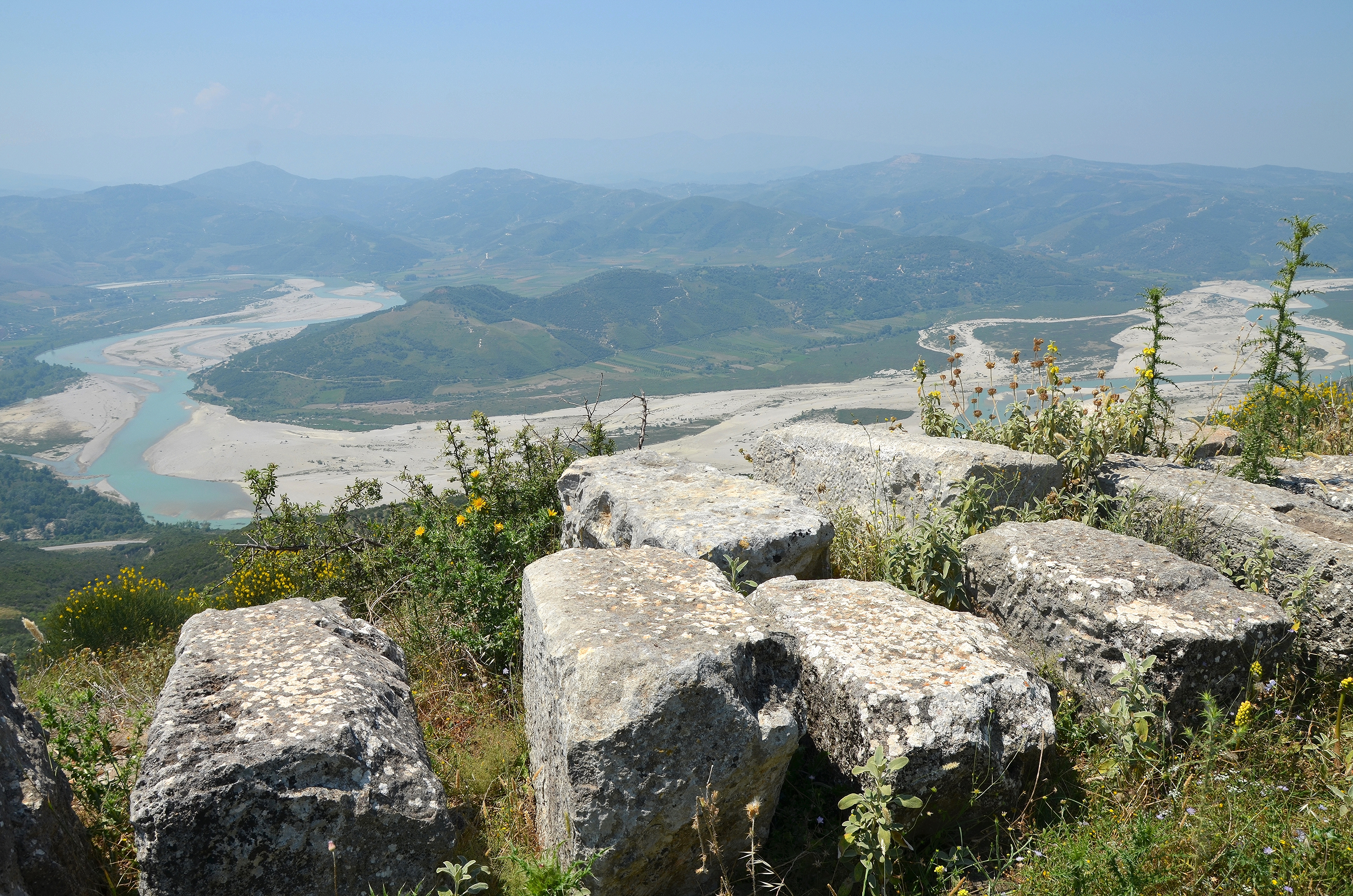
View towards the Vjosa valley from Byllis, the chief city and one of the two centres of the Illyrian koinon of the Bylliones

In ancient times the upper course of the river was situated in Epirus, and the lower course in Illyria. Together with the Ceraunian Mountains the first part of the river up to around Tepelenë marked the boundary between the classical regions of Illyria and Epirus, and between the Roman provinces of Epirus Nova and Epirus Vetus. The lower valley was inhabited by the indigenous tribes of Bylliones on the right shore and Amantes on the left shore. Starting from mid-7th century BCE the southern Illyrian area of the lower Aoos experienced the emergence of proto-urban centers, including the fortifications of Kutë, Klos, Mashkjezë, Margëlliç and Strum on the right shore, and those of Amantia, Mavrovë and Treport on the left shore.

Apollonia in Illyria was founded on the right bank near the mouth of the river around 600 BC by Greek colonists from Corinth and possibly Corcyra, who established a trading settlement on a largely abandoned coastal site by invitation of the local Illyrians. It developed into an independent polis, and thrived throughout classical antiquity becoming one of the most important urban centres in the wider region, perhaps representing the most important of the several classical towns of the same name. The Thesprotian tribe of Parauaioi received their name from the river, as those living beside it. Pausanias writes of "sharks" (Greek: θηρία) in the river, as it flows through Thesprotia. It is mentioned as Avos (Greek: Αύος) by Stephanus of Byzantium in the sixth century AD.

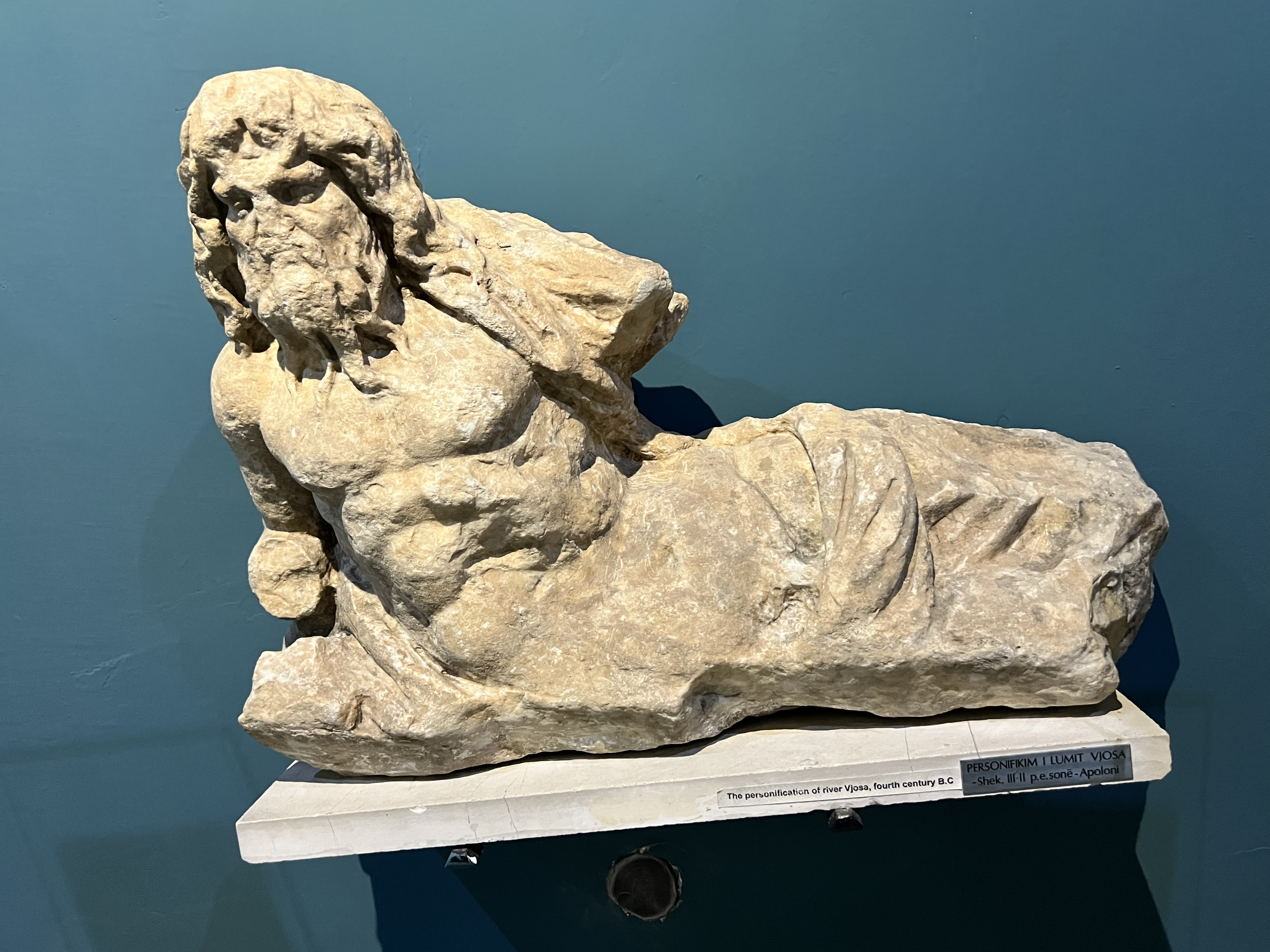
The personification of Vjosa River. Found in Apollonia

In 274 BC Pyrrhus of Epirus defeated Antigonus II Gonatas near the river's banks. In 198 BC, Philip V of Macedon and the Roman Titus Quinctius Flamininus, clashed in the Battle of the Aous. In 170 BC a plot to kidnap Aulus Hostilius Mancinus was foiled by Molossians by mistake.

== Conservation ==
=== Greece ===
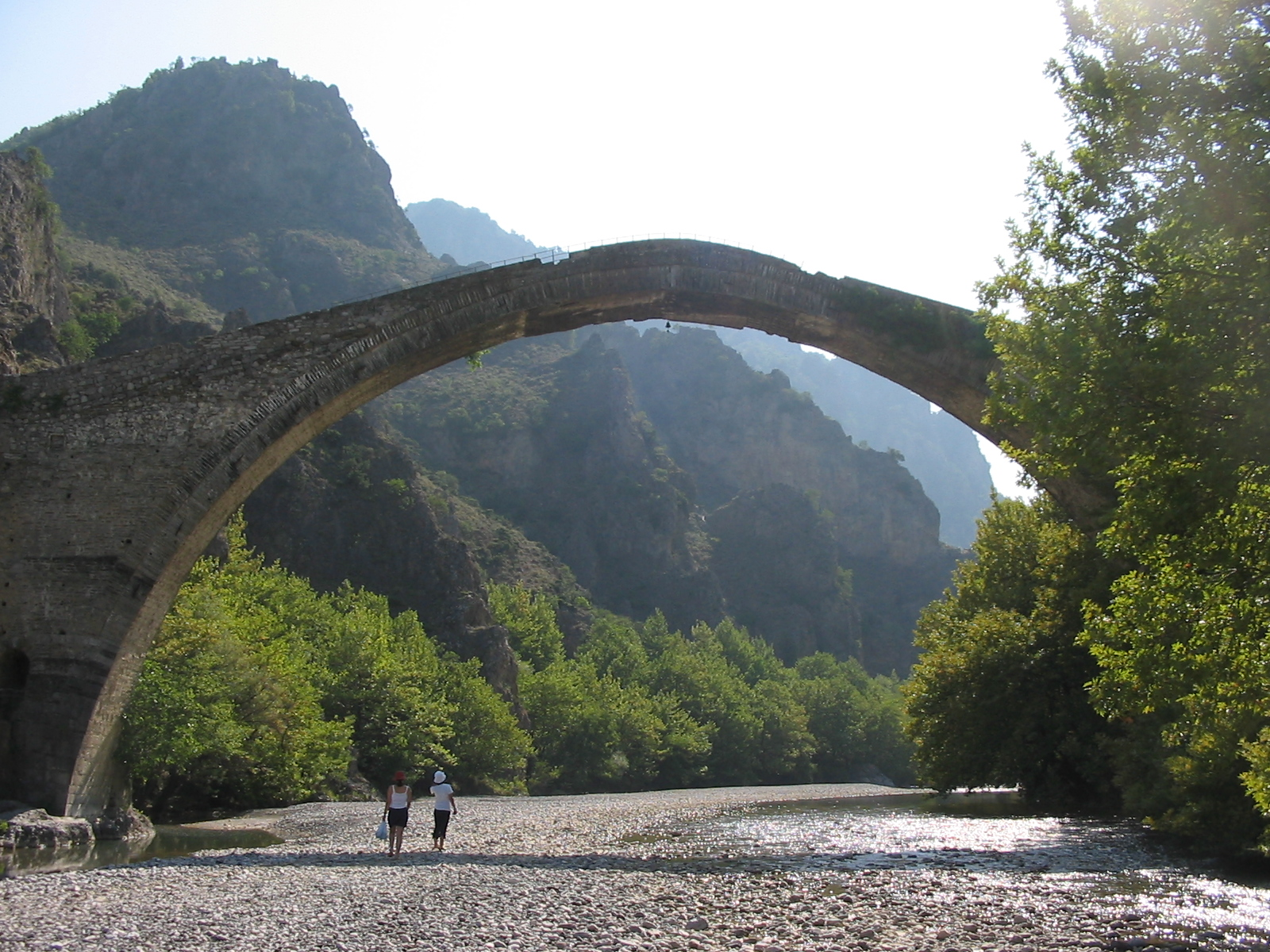
The old Konitsa Bridge over the Aoos River, just before the Vikos–Aoös National Park

The Vikos–Aoös National Park (Greek: Εθνικός Δρυμός Βίκου–Αώου Ethnikós Drymós Víkou–Aóou), created in 1973, is a national park in Epirus in northwestern Greece and UNESCO Geopark. The national park encompasses 126 square kilometres (31,135 acres) of mountainous terrain, with numerous rivers, lakes, caves, canyons, and coniferous and deciduous forest. The core of the 3,400 hectare park is the Vikos Gorge, carved by the Voidomatis River, while the Aoos Gorge, Mount Tymfi, with its highest peak, Gamila, at 2,497 metres (8,192 ft), and a number of settlements forming the park's peripheral zone.

=== Albania ===
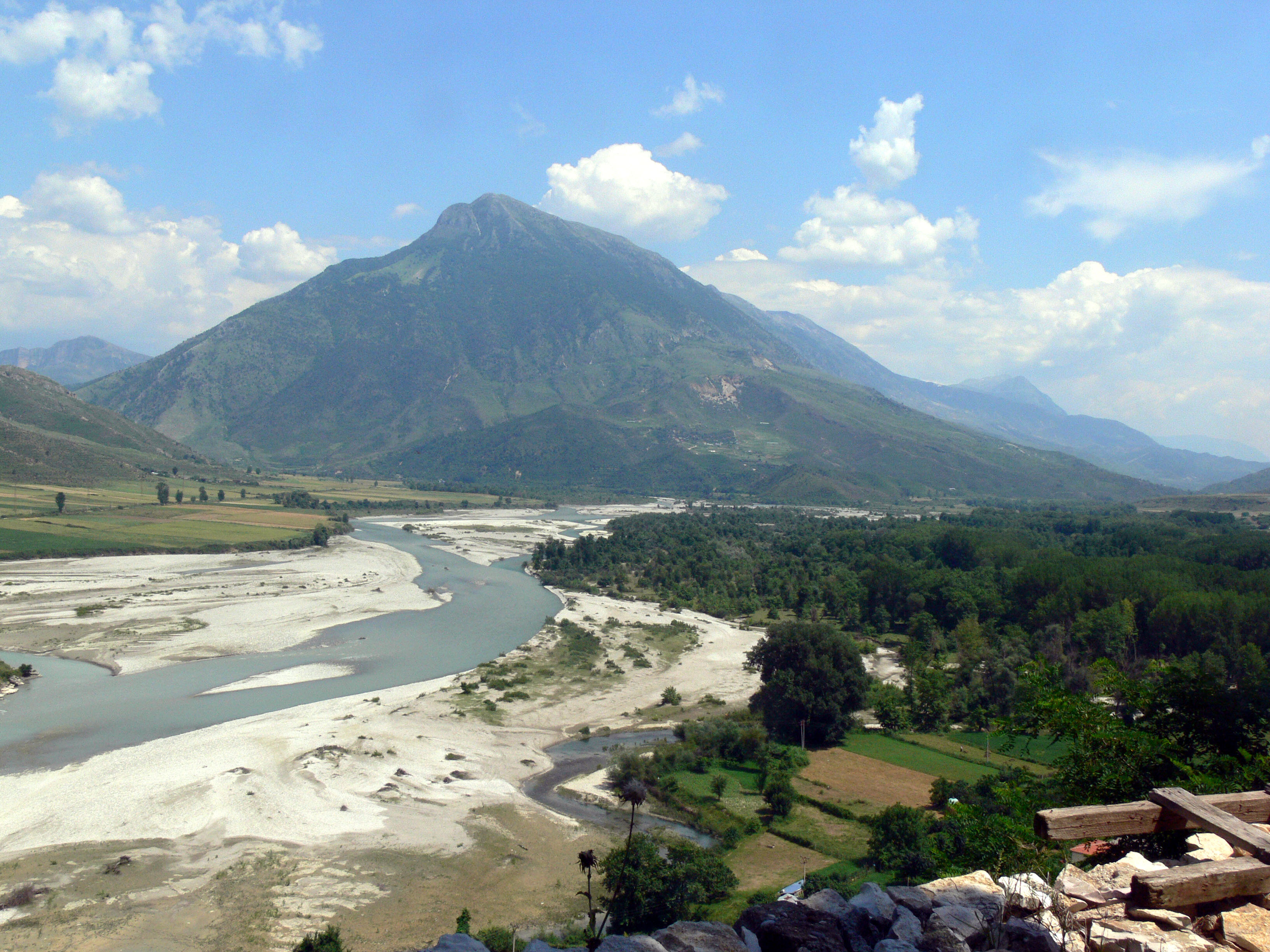
The Vjosë upstream from Tepelenë

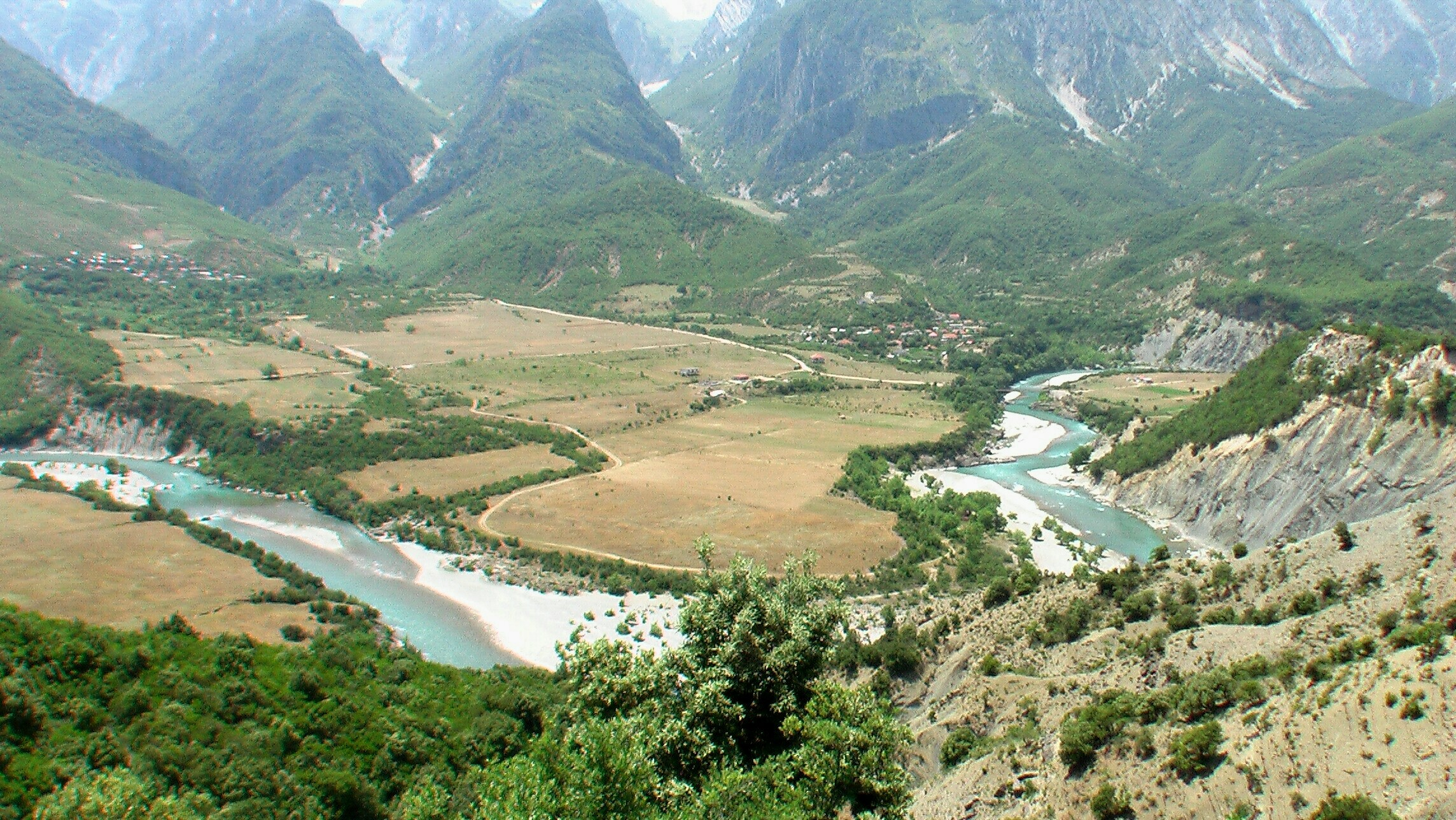
View of Vjosë and the Nemerçkë Mountain near Çarshova

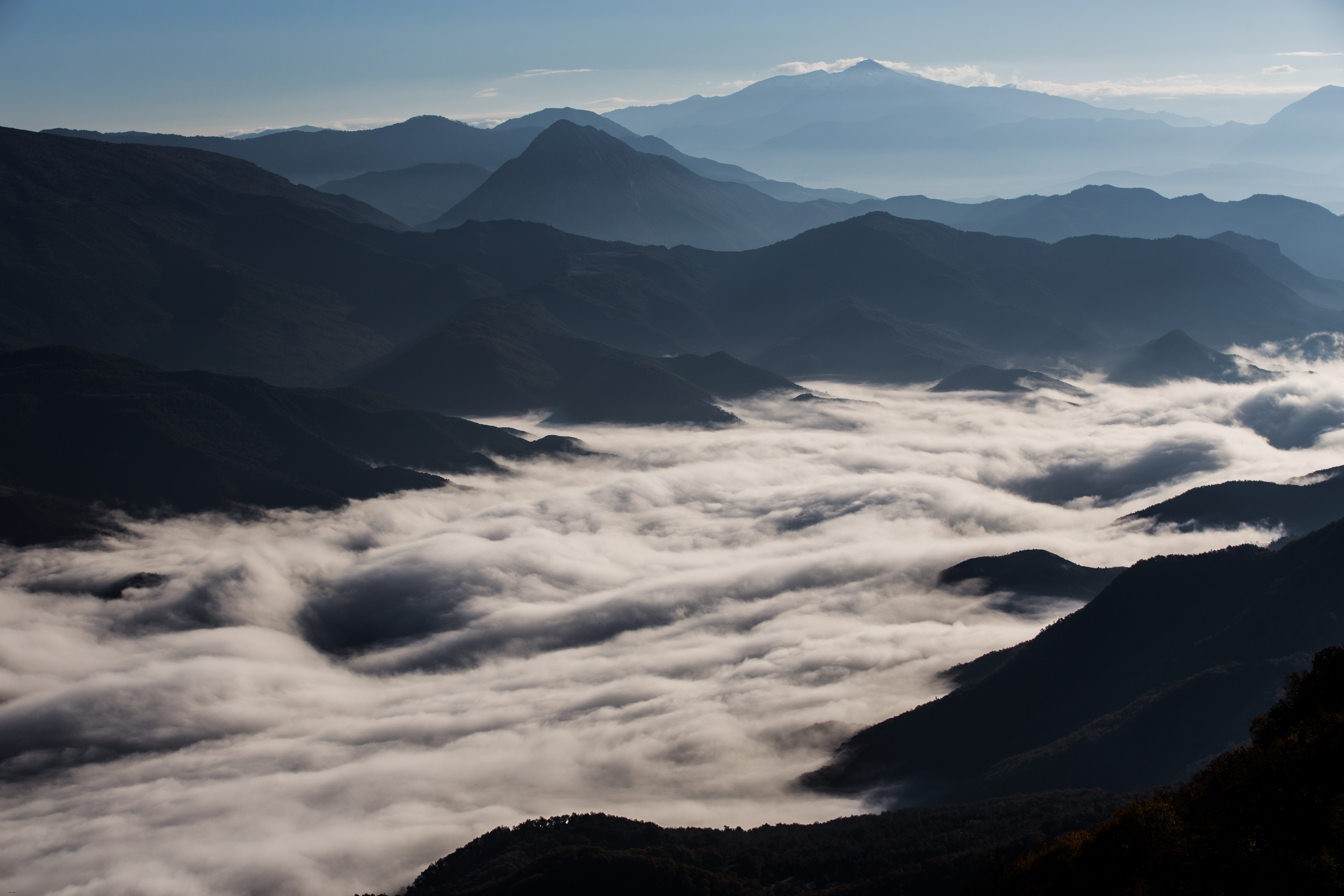
Vjosë Valley

In February 2005, the Albanian government made the Vjose-Narte wetlands a protected area. This legislation followed Albania's ratification of the Kyoto Protocol in December 2004. The river contributes water to the Vjosë-Levan-Fier irrigation canal, a canal that was built in the 1950s to irrigate the Myzeqe. In December 2020, the Albanian portion of the river was designated a "Managed Nature Reserve" by the Albanian government.

The Vjosa's potential for hydropower has attracted developers to submit proposal to planning authorities for dam projects along the river and its tributaries. By 2017, over 2000 dam projects had gained governmental approval on stretches of river throughout the Balkans, including the Vjosa's channel. Developers have met with opposition from European nature organisations including RiverWatch, EuroNatur, and EcoAlbania.

A 2012 study assessed the hydromorphology of the Balkan's rivers, taking into account the structural status of 35,000 river kilometres. The study showed that the region's rivers are largely intact, with 30% deemed pristine and 50% slightly modified.

In February 2020, a campaign to elevate the status of the Vjosa watershed to Vjosa National Park gained approval from 20 environmental groups under the leadership of EcoAlbania. The effort to create Europe's first wild river park and save 300 km of rivers and streams targeted several projects identified in a February 2021 proposal.

In September 2020, Albanian prime minister Edi Rama announced that a protected area will be created around the Vjosa. In December 2020, the Albanian government designated the Vjosa River as a "Managed Nature Reserve" or nature park. Environmental groups are skeptical of the level of protection afforded by "protected" status. A national park designation would prohibit hydroelectric projects, airports, and other development; a protected area designation would not.

In April 2021 a petition signed by Vjosa River scientists was delivered to Albanian president Ilir Meta. The scientists immediate concern is a plan by a Turkish-Albanian venture, Ayen ALB, to build a 50-metre high hydroelectric dam. It would be the first development to change the course of Albania's 200 kilometre portion of the river. The dam would flood areas populated with the 1,175 animal and plant species—some endangered. It would inundate farmland, destroy the river's fishery, and force thousands from their homes. Activists maintain that the government should focus on other less damaging renewable energy sources.

On 15 March 2023, after advocacy and negotiations by individuals including Besjana Guri and Olsi Nika, the Vjosa River became a protected national park under the name of the Vjosa Wild River National Park.

== Drainage basin ==
- ◆ flowing through Greece

- Vjosa
  - Sarantaporos 〜
  - Voidomatis 〜
  - Çarçovë
    - Përroi i Postenanit
  - Darsi
  - Lengaricë
    - Përroi i Ogdunanit
    - Gostivisht
    - Ani
    - Piskal
      - Përroi i Boshnjakut
      - Përroi i Vreshtave
      - Përroi i Virit
    - Rodom
    - Dedovë
    - Peshtanicë
    - Përroi i Treskës
      - Përroi i Varicës
    - Osnat
    - Barmash
    - Podë
  - Lumicë
    - Lum i Turbullt
    - Leminjiza
  - Shlikë
  - Dishnicë
    - Përroi i Petranikut
  - Zagorie
  - Drino 〜
    - Gjarakar
    - Kardhiq
      - Përroi i Zi
      - Kollopanas
      - Cullunarët
      - Piriu
        - Panja
      - Përroi i Blirit
      - Gugash
      - Gjoshnikosh
        - Valet
      - Vexhisht
    - Nimicë
    - Suha
      - Gryka e Selckës
        - Selckë
    - Bënça
      - Gura
  - Përroi i Çelës
  - Shushicë
    - Smokthina
      - Përroi i Ramicës
    - Kaur
    - Përroi i Gjormit
    - Përroi i Pajamesë
    - Shuri i Kuçit

== See also ==
- List of rivers of Albania
- List of rivers of Greece
