= Nartë =

Nartë Άρτα
- Village
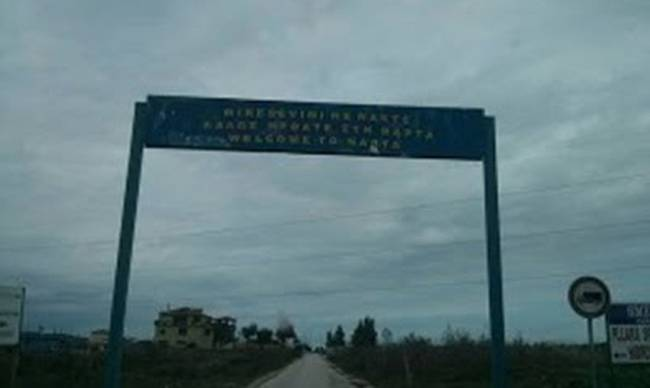
- Trilingual sign in Nartë

- Location within Albania
- Coordinates: 40°29′57″N 19°27′26″E
- Country: Albania
- County: Vlorë
- Municipality: Vlorë
- Administrative unit: Qendër Vlorë
- Time zone: UTC+1 (CET)
  - Summer (DST): UTC+2 (CEST)

Nartë (Albanian definite form: Narta; Greek: Νάρτα, also Άρτα, Arta or Παλαιοάρτα, Palioarta) is a community in Vlorë County. At the 2015 local government reform it became part of the municipality Vlorë. It is situated northwest of the city of Vlorë. It is predominantly inhabited by ethnic Greeks who speak a unique northern Greek dialect, as well as Albanian.

== Etymology ==
There is no convincing origin for the name of the settlement. Doris Kyriazis argues that the toponym Narta derives from Slavic and means 'summit', 'cape'. Synonymous toponyms are also found in various locations in the Slavic world. According to this view, from Slavic it would have been transmitted into Greek Άρτα and Albanian Nartë. Kyriazis also states that the prefix n- comes possibly from the Greek language through the evolution 'tin Arta' -> 'ti Narta' -> 'Narta' and was used as a loan in the Albanian language. Alternatively Shaban Demiraj argues that the name Nartë is from through the Albanian preposition në meaning "in" or "to", and Arta.

== Demographics ==
The local population are predominantly members of the ethnic Greek minority in Albania, just like the inhabitants of neighboring Zvërnec, and both use a distinct northern idiom of modern Greek. They also speak Albanian. Due to emigration to Greece, the population of the village as of 2023 is estimated to be no more than 250; one-tenth of its population three decades ago.

== Dialect ==
Narte is the northernmost area of Greek speech among the Greek speaking regions in Albania, while in the local dialect northern vocalism prevails. Due it its geographic isolation it preserves archaic features. Under this context it has partial isoglosses with Greek speech in Magna Graecia, the Ionian islands, Epirus but also with more distant Greek-speaking centres: Cyprus, Thrace and Asia Minor. Due to the isolation of the People's Republic of Albania (1945-1991) the local Greek dialect was not affected by modern standard Greek. Nevertheless after the restoration of democracy in Albania (1991) standard Greek became popular especially among the younger generations.

According to Doris Kyriazis, the uninterrupted presence of the local Greek dialect is also attested by the loans it provided to the adjacent Albanian dialects.

== History ==
During classical antiquity the coastal area of the Bay of Vlorë, where the present-day villages of Nartë and Zvërnec are located, was settled by Ancient Greeks. Since at present those two villages constitute the northernmost pockets of Modern Greek speech, scholar Hatzopoulos (1997) wonders if it is a coincidence or they are isolated relics of the ancient Balaiitai and Horikioi. The view of an uninterrupted Greek presence from antiquity is rejected by Sh. Demiraj (2010), on the grounds that it is not backed up by linguistic evidence or historic documentation, instead arguing that their ancestors consist of relatively late incoming emigrants from the Greek speaking areas of Arta. Demiraj points to anthroponymic data gathered from 16th century Ottoman tax registers, specifically those of the years 1520 and 1583, in which the defters of the village of Narta display south Albanian Orthodox anthroponomy. Moreover, the names attested lack the Greek suffix "s", and contain consonants unusual to modern Greek, such as /b (Bogdan, Tërbari). Since the population of the village partly consists of immigrants from neighboring Albanian villages, indicated by surnames like Bulku or Palasa, the issue regarding the use of the Greek language remains open. Kyriazis (2012) argues that those 16th century Ottoman registers provide proofs of the continuity and the differentiation of the synthesis of the population. He also states that if we consider that the local Greek speech has a depth of time that reaches antiquity, then we should investigate and interpret how and when it acquired characteristics of northern vocalism.

The settlement is mentioned at the first time as Narda in an Ottoman traveller's log of 1520.

In 1873 a Greek school was founded in the village. Greek education was expanded with the opening of a girls' school and a kindergarten in the early 1900s.

With the incorporation of the area to the Albanian state (1912) the Greek school was closed down. During the People's Republic of Albania (1945-1991) public use of the Greek language was prohibited as well as any mention of the Greek origin of the locals.

== Geography ==
The surrounding region has many salt marshes. Narta Lagoon, which hosts a unique ecosystem, lies north of the village. The salt marches of Narta constitute a rare and characteristic habitat type and is a unique feature in Albania.

== Attractions ==
One of the local tourist attractions is the annual three-day festival. It was revived on 11-13 April 2004, after a lapse of several years. It takes place in the second week of April were Carnival celebration occur. The festivities also include concerts, an ethno-gastronomic fair, sports and public awareness events.

An Orthodox church lies on the centre of the village.

== Bibliography ==
- Demiraj, Shaban (2010). "Narta". In Demiraj, Bardhyl (ed.). Wir sind die Deinen: Studien zur albanischen Sprache, Literatur und Kulturgeschichte, dem Gedenken an Martin Camaj (1925-1992) gewidmet (in Albanian). Harrassowitz Verlag. ISBN 978-3-447-06221-3.
- Hatzopoulos, M. B.; Sakellariou, M.; Loukopoulou, L. D. (1997). Epirus, Four Thousand Years of Greek History and Civilization. Ekdotike Athenon. ISBN 960-213-377-5.
- Kyriazis, Doris (2012). "The Greek Idiom of Arta (Vlore)". 10ο Διεθνές Συνέδριο Ελληνικής Γλωσσολογίας: 891.
- Kyriazis, Doris K. (2018). "Language contact and onomastics: tautological constructs, folk etymologies and some methodological issues". Romanoslavica. LIV (3): 161–170. ISSN 2537-4214.
- Papayannis, Thymio (2008). Action for culture in Mediterranean wetlands (PDF). Athens: Med-INA. ISBN 978-960-89972-0-2.
