= Shushica (river) =

River in Albania

Shushicë
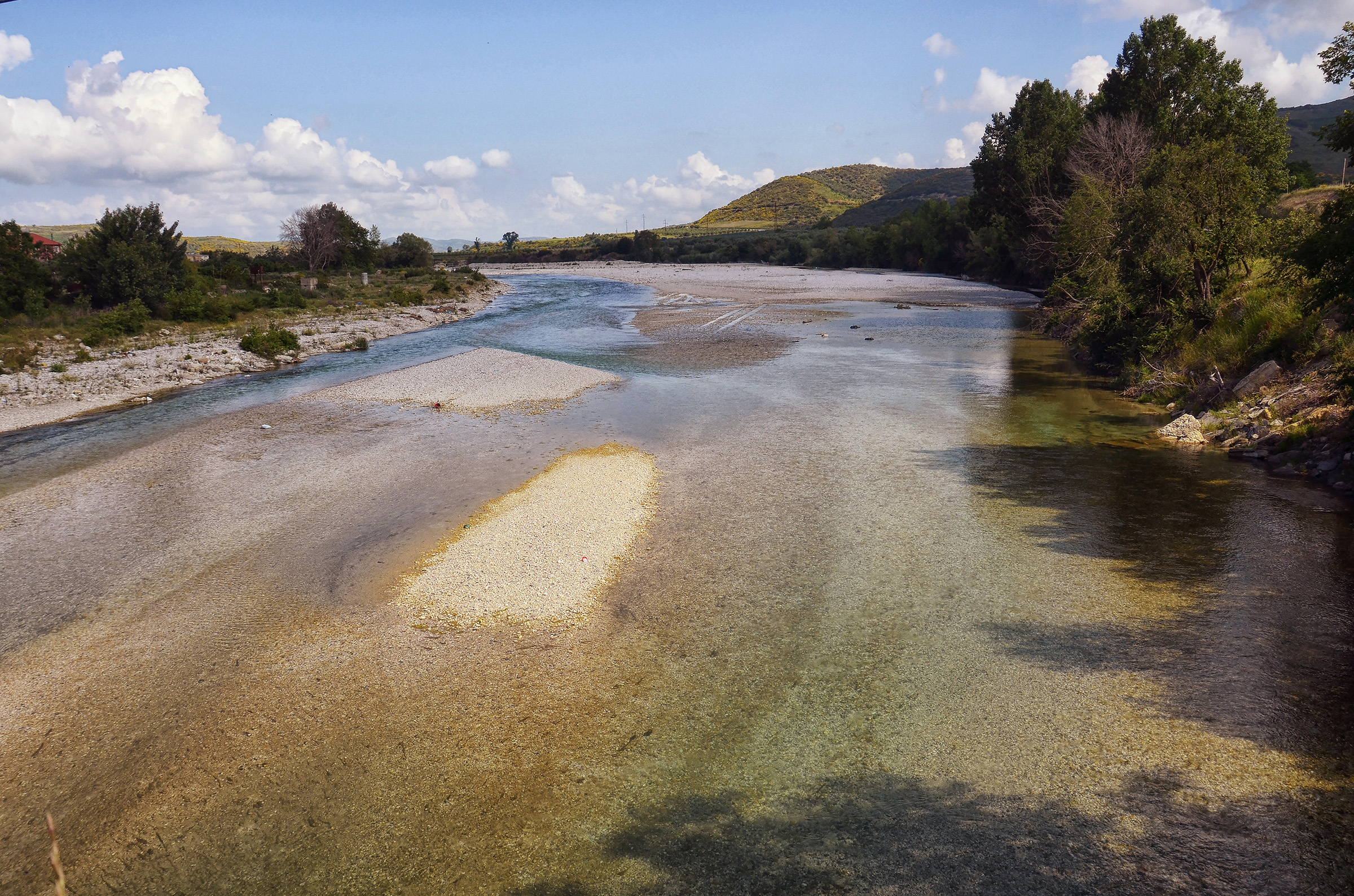
- Shushica river flowing near Selenicë

Location
- Country: Albania

Physical characteristics
- Source
  - location: Vlorë County
- Mouth
  - location: Vjosë
  - coordinates: 40°34′8″N 19°34′13″E
- Length: 80 km (50 mi)

Basin features
- Progression: Vjosë→ Adriatic Sea

The Shushicë or Vlora river is a river in southern Albania, and a tributary of the Vjosë. Its source is in the Vlorë County, near the village Kuç, municipality Himarë. It flows generally northwest through Brataj, Kotë and Shushicë and flows into the Vjosë near Armen, northeast of Vlorë.

The agricultural use of the river valley is very intensive and begins at the headwaters. Along the river there are so far three bridges which are located on the lower reaches at Peshkëpi, Drashovicë and Kotë.

In December 1940, during the Greco-Italian War of the World War II, the advancing Greek forces penetrated through Shushicë valley pushing the Italian units back in a successful operation that led to the fall of Himara.

During September and October 1943, the area was the battlefield of the battle of Drashovica part of the Albanian Resistance of World War II where the local Albanian resistance groups ,National Liberation Movement of Albania and the National Front of Albania, cooperated and won against the German Army.

In antiquity the river was called Polyanthos (Greek: Πολύανθος) and Chaonites (Greek: Χαονίτης).

== See also ==
- List of rivers of Albania
