= Mesopotam =

Mesopotam Μεσοπόταμος
- Administrative unit
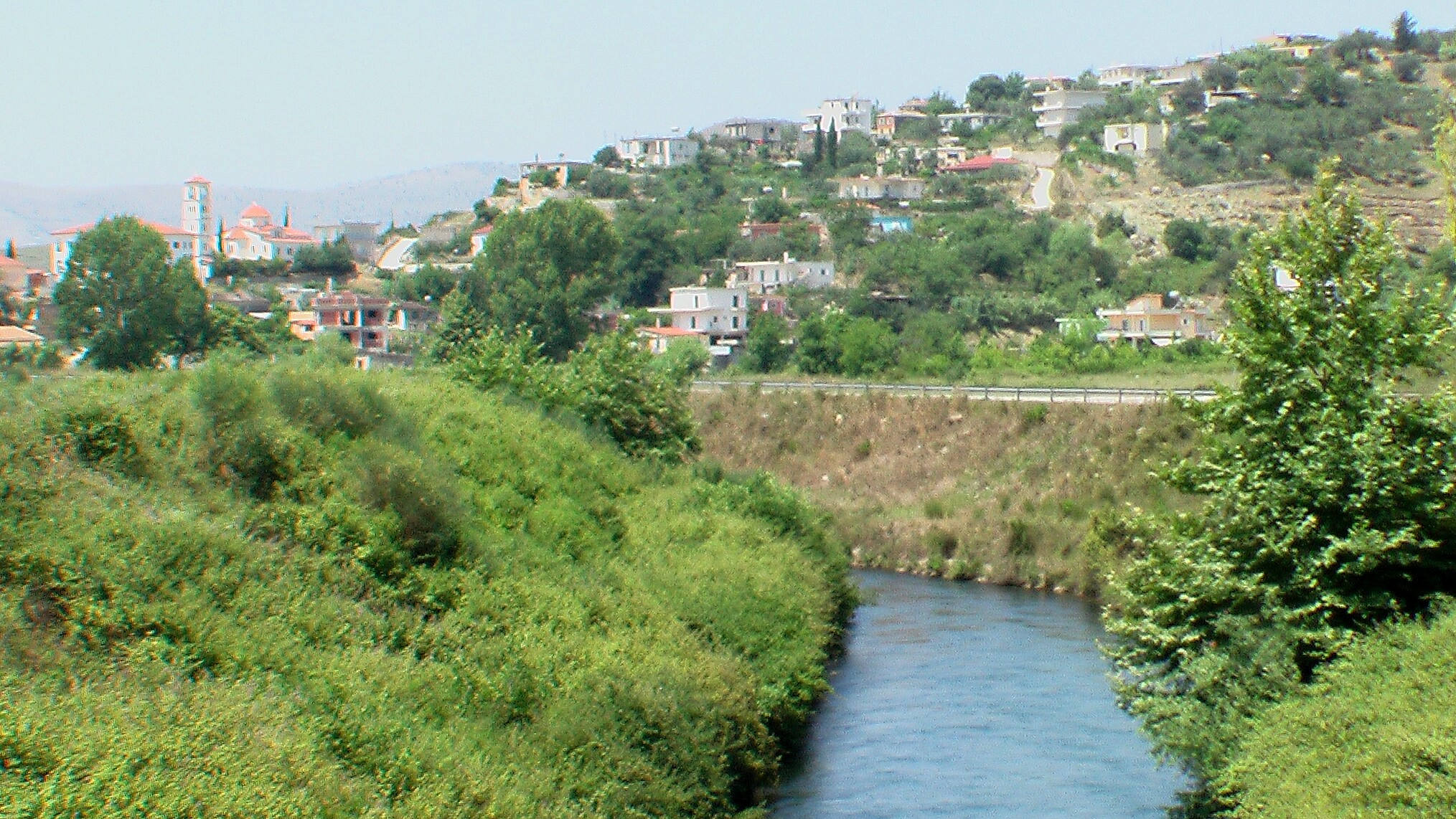
- View of Mesopotam village in Finiq

- Location within Albania
- Coordinates: 39°55′N 20°6′E
- Country: Albania
- County: Vlorë
- Municipality: Finiq

Population (2011)
  - Total: 2,786
- Time zone: UTC+1 (CET)
  - Summer (DST): UTC+2 (CEST)
- Postal Code: 9717

Mesopotam (Albanian definite form: Mesopotami; Greek: Μεσοπόταμος - Mesopotamos) is a village and a former commune in Vlorë County, southern Albania. At the 2015 local government reform it became a subdivision of the municipality Finiq. The population at the 2011 census was 2,786,

Besides the village Mesopotam from which it takes its name and which functions as well as an administrative center, the administrative unit consists of 14 other villages: Ardhasovë, Bistricë, Brajlat, Dhrovjan, Fitore, Kardhikaq, Kostar, Kranë, Krongj, Livinë, Muzinë, Pecë, Sirakat, and Velahovë.

== Population ==
The People's Republic of Albania (1945-1991) established cultural rights in special minority zones for ethnic Greeks in all 14 villages of Mesopotam. These rights were preserved after the fall of socialism in Albania. In 1992, the Greek community inhabited the majority of villages, including Mesopotam itself, while Muzinë and Pecë, by the Albanian Orthodox. Bistricë had a mixed population and Kardhikaq was a mixed village inhabited by Greeks and Aromanians.

== Attractions ==
The Mesopotam village is known for its 13th century Orthodox Church dedicated to St. Nicholas, declared "Protected Monument" from the government.

The Blue Eye water spring nearby is a well-known touristic.

== Notable people ==
- Constantine Mesopotamites, Byzantine official.

== See also ==
- Tourism in Albania
- Bistricë river
- Phoenice
- List of Religious Cultural Monuments of Albania
