= Bistricë (river) =

River in Albania

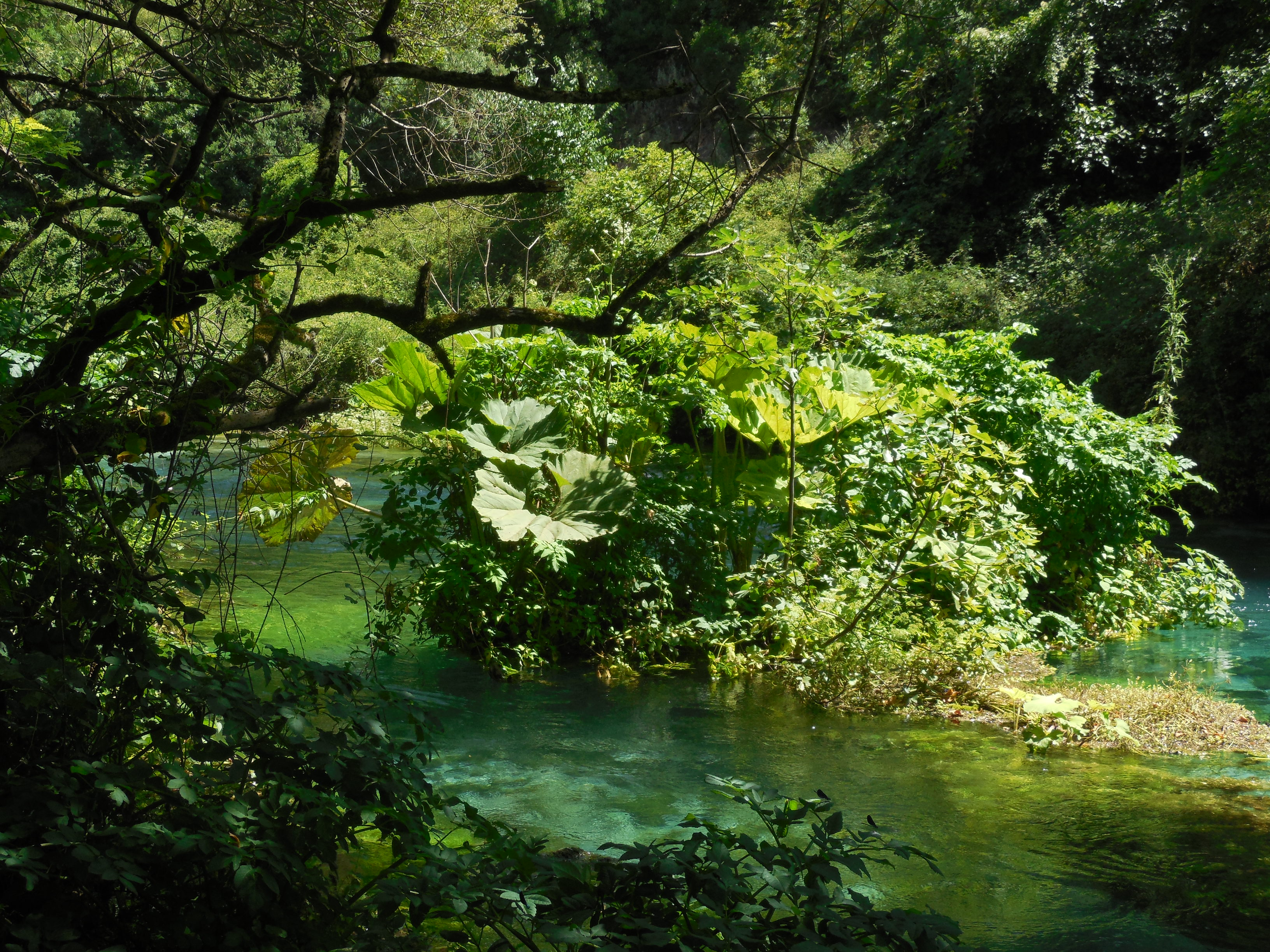
- View from the artificial lake on rivers' basin

Location
- Country: Albania

Physical characteristics
- Source
  - location: Syri i Kaltër, Vlorë County, Albania
- Mouth
  - location: Ionian Sea
  - coordinates: 39°50′38″N 20°1′52″E
- Length: 25 km (16 mi)
- Discharge
  - average: 40.4–66.4 m^{3}/s (1,430–2,340 cu ft/s) (August–Winter)

Bistricë (Albanian indefinite form: Bistricë; Albanian: Lumi i Bistricës) is a river in southwestern Albania. It ends in the Ionian Sea.

== Etymology ==
The name Bistrica comes from Slavic, meaning "clear (water)". Other toponyms including "Bistrica" in Balkan countries indicate the Slavic origin of the toponym.

== Course ==
Bistrica starts from Mali i Gjerë (also known as Sopot) in Finiq municipality directing initially versus south-west. The main source is near Krongj ("The Blue Eye" source), also gathering other sources from the nearby villages of Pecë, Kardhikaq, Velahovë, and other smaller brooks. It passes through Mesopotam and Finiq municipalities, parallel with the Sarandë-Gjirokastër road.

Initially the river ended in Lake Butrint, which connects with the Ionian sea through the Channel of Vivari. In 1958, it was deviated as Çukë channel straight to the sea.

The river is 25 kilometres (16 mi) long.

== Economy and tourism ==
The river is not navigable. There is an artificial lake with the same name (Albanian: Liqeni i Bistricës) built on its basin, and three hydro-power stations built in the '60. The river's waters are used to a certain extent as a supply for the nearby fields of Vurg area. All the stations passed through the privatization process from 2010 with plenty of controversies.

A well known touristic place is the "Azure Eye", often referred as "Blue Eye" (Albanian: Syri i Kaltër), a spring tributary to Bistrica river near the village named Krongj, with a rich flora and fauna.

== Drainage basin ==
- Bistricë
  - Vrisi
  - Kardhikaq
  - Navaricë
  - Buazë
  - Kalasa
    - Delvinë
    - Përroi i Mursiut
  - Galisht
    - Përroi i Shtogjes
    - Përroi i Rrakisë
    - Përroi i Reçit
    - Përroi i Arrës

== See also ==
- List of rivers of Albania
- List of lakes of Albania
- Tourism in Albania
- Hydroelectricity in Albania

== Sources ==
- Sjöberg, Örjan. "A Contribution to the Geography of Hydro-Electric Power Generation in Albania", Osterreichische Osthefte [Vienna], 29, No. 1, 1987, 5-27. ISSN 0029-9375
- Mevlan Kabos; Eshref Pumo; Farudin Krutaj. "Gjeografia fizike e Shqipërisë : në dy vëllime", Qendra e Studimeve Gjeografike (Akademia e Shkencave e RPS të Shqipërisë), 1990–1991, 112. OCLC 38055712
