= Kalasa (river) =

River in Albania

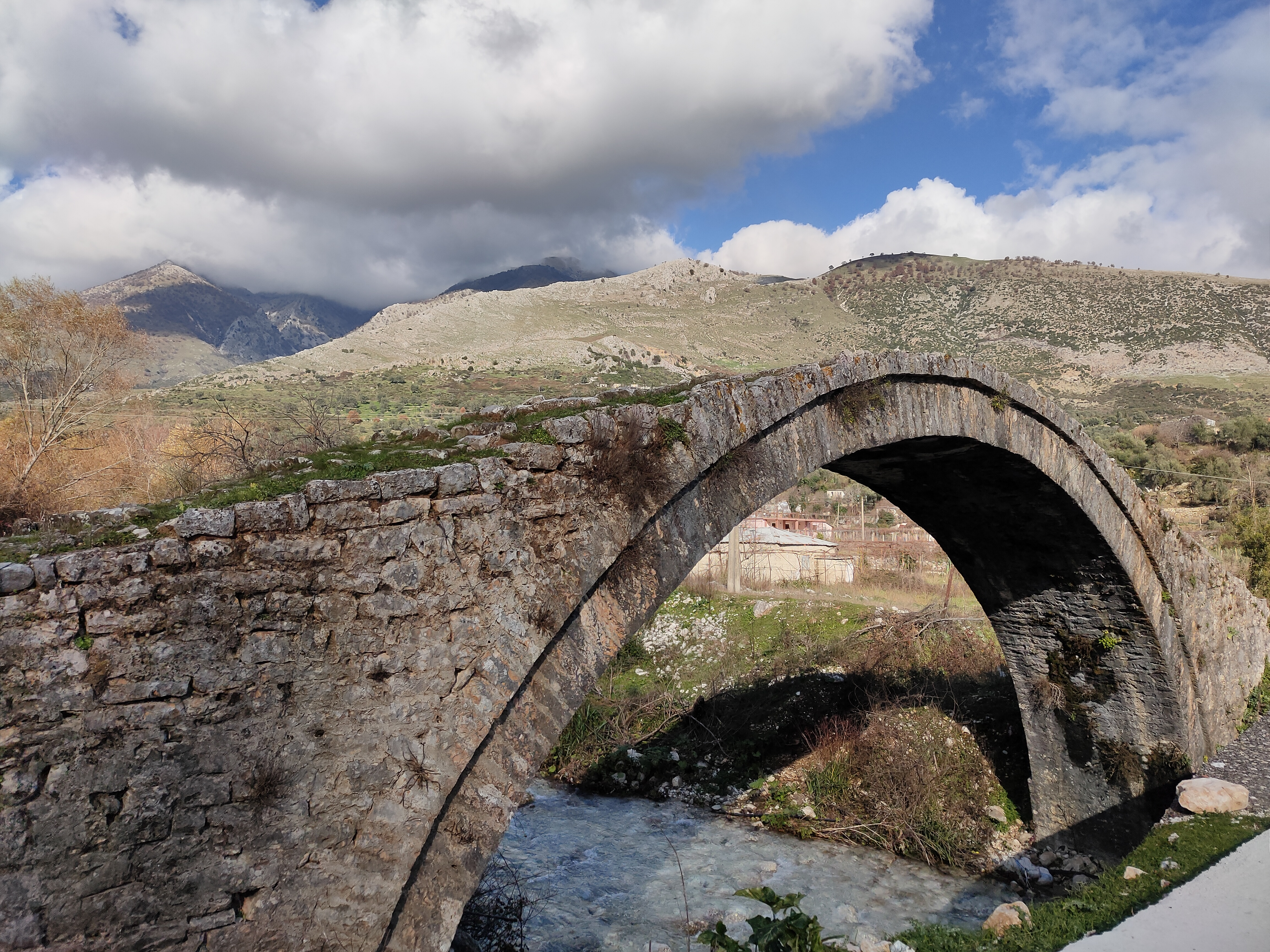
- Kalasa river flowing under the Jesir bridge

Location
- Country: Albania

Physical characteristics
- Mouth: Ionian Sea, Albania
  - coordinates: 39.9360559°N 20.0299148°E
- Length: 41.1 km (25.5 mi)
- Basin size: 284 km^{2} (110 sq mi)
- Discharge
  - average: 9.1 m^{3}/s (320 cu ft/s)

Kalasa is a river in southern Albania and the principal tributary of the Bistricë River. Located in Vlorë County, it drains a catchment area of approximately 284 km^{2} (110 sq mi) and has a length of about 41.1 km (25.5 mi). The river flows through the regions of Delvinë and Sarandë, forming part of the hydrological system of the Ionian Sea basin.

== Course ==
Kalasa rises on the southern slopes of Mount Galisht and initially follows a southeasterly course. Near the village of Tatzat, it is fed by several major karst springs, which substantially increase its discharge. It then receives streams from the Delvinë and Gajdar areas before crossing the Vurg Plain and joining Bistricë.

The river basin exhibits considerable topographic variation. Its upper section is mountainous, with elevations ranging from 1,200 to 1,800 m (3,900–5,900 ft), while the middle basin consists of rolling hills and valleys. The lower course extends across the flat alluvial terrain of the Vurg Plain, one of the most important agricultural areas in southern Albania.

The river basin has a mean elevation of 531 m (1,742 ft) and a relatively steep channel gradient, averaging about 30 m/km.

== Hydrology ==
Prior to the mid-20th century, the lower Kalasa meandered through extensive marshes and reed beds. During a land-reclamation programme completed in 1959, these wetlands were drained and the river was diverted into the Bistricë. Its lower course was subsequently channelized and protected by embankments, while an extensive irrigation network was developed across the plain.

A substantial portion of the river’s discharge originates from karst groundwater, particularly from springs near Tatzat, helping maintain relatively stable flow conditions throughout the year.

Part of the river’s water is diverted through a 2,350 m (7,710 ft) tunnel beneath Mount Lavan to the Sasaj Hydroelectric Power Plant, which has an installed capacity of about 5.5 MW. The diverted water is also used for irrigation in the Upper Albanian Riviera.

== See also ==
- List of rivers of Albania
