= St. Nicholas Monastery Church, Mesopotam =

12th-century church in Albania

St. Nicholas' Monastery Church
- Kisha e Manastirit të Shën Kollit (Albanian); Καθολικό Ιεράς Μονής Αγίου Νικολάου (Greek)
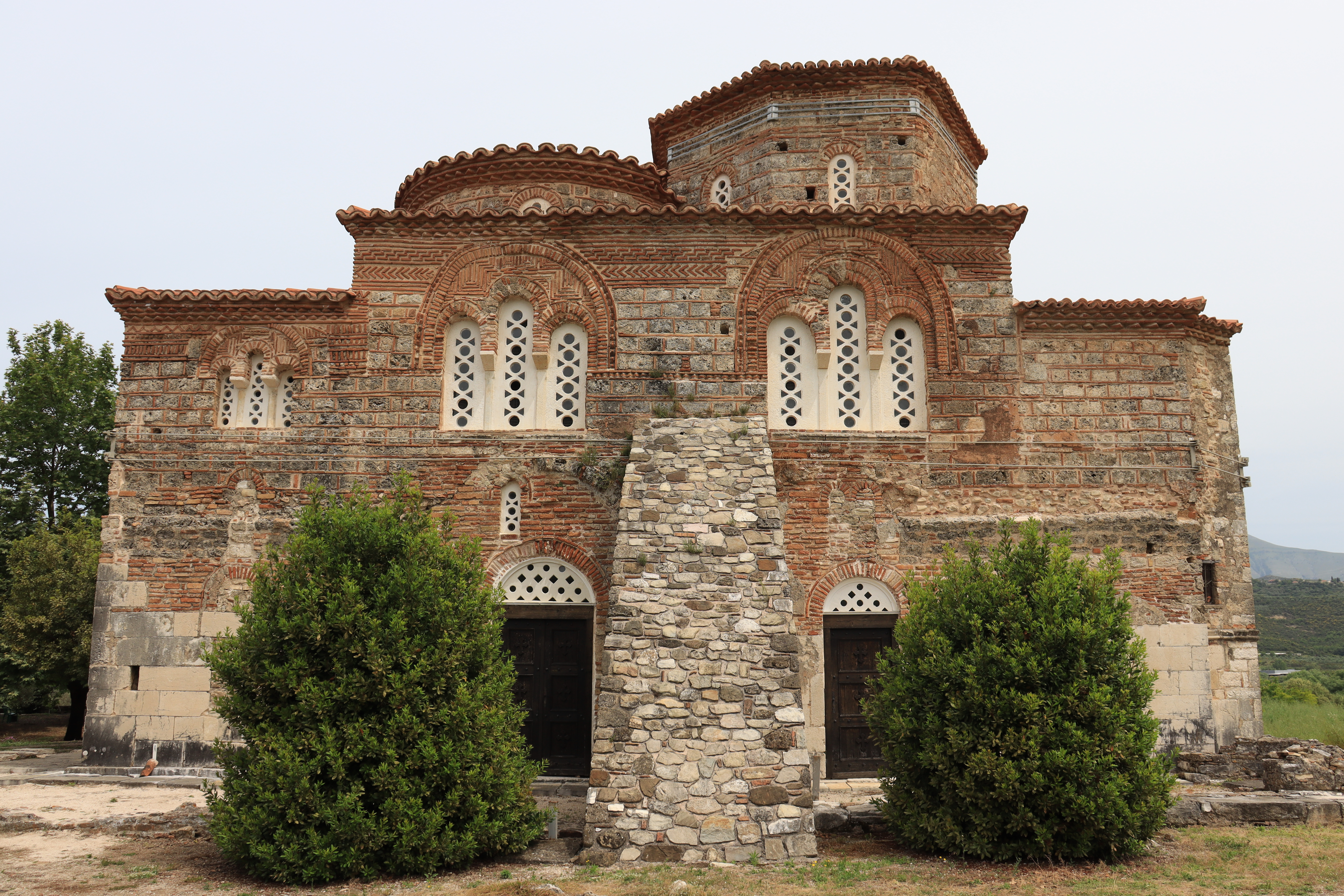
- Church of Saint Nichοlas
- Interactive map of St. Nicholas' Monastery Church
- 39.9058°N 20.1006°E
- Location: Mesopotam

Cultural Monument of Albania
- Designated: 1224

St. Nicholas Monastery Church (Albanian: Kisha e Manastirit të Shën Kollit; Greek: Καθολικό Ιεράς Μονής Αγίου Νικολάου) is the katholikon of the abandoned Orthodox monastery of Saint George in Mesopotam, Vlorë County, Albania.

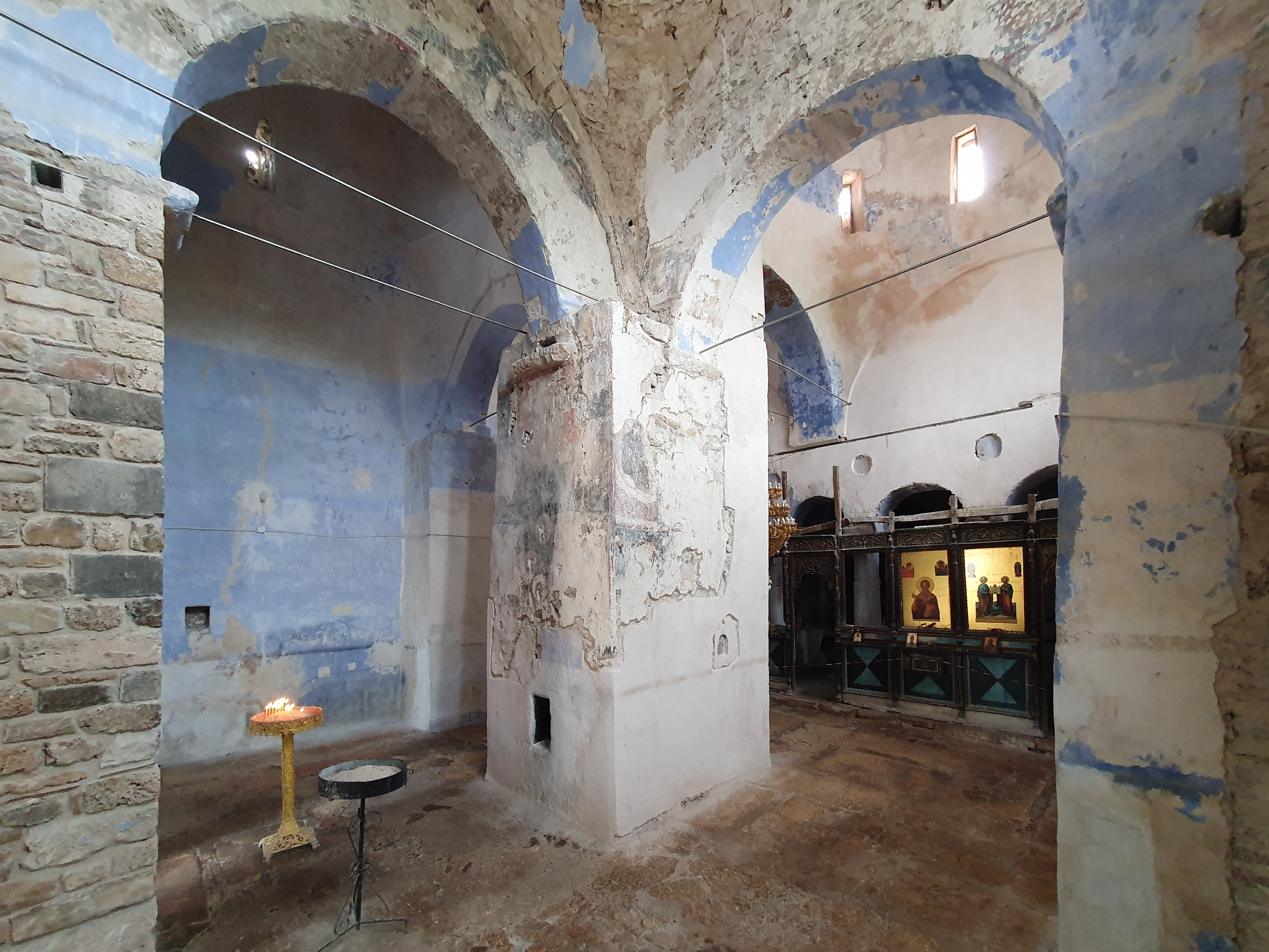
Interior of the church

== History ==
The monastery is thought to have been built in 1224 or 1225. It was once enclosed by a circular wall which is today only partly preserved. Its double apse makes it unique in its genre, and it is thought of as this was due to the monastery being used by two religious rites (Catholic and Orthodox).

The monastery was stauropegion and as such directly dependent to the Ecumenical Patriarch of Constantinople. As stauropegion it was also free of the jurisdiction of the local bishopric. During the early 14th century the bishop of nearby Chimara (modern Himara) tried to impose his authority but this resulted to his expulsion from the see. When John Glykys has been elected Patriarch he issued a decree confirming the privileged status of the Mesopotamon monastery.

The Orthodox monastery was built on the walls of a much older temple. An Albanian Heritage Foundation team, directed by architect Reshat Gega, conducted research on the monastery, performing excavations and restoration over a period of 20 years. Evidence the team found included Hellenic stones from the 3rd-4th centuries BC, confirming the connection with the capital of the Epirote League at Phoenice (modern Finik) located 3 km from the monastery. One of the decorative stones bears the inscription "Menelau", presumed to be a reference to the Spartan King Menelaus whose brother Agamemnon led the assault during the Trojan War.

The nearby area includes the ancient site of Buthrotum which the Roman writer Virgil says was founded by Trojan descendants of Priam, who settled in the area after the Trojan War.

The original openings in the temple walls have been used as either alcoves or windows by the builders of the monastery. An accompanying photograph shows such an alcove with an icon of the Saint Nicholas, the patron saint of the monastery.

It is designated as a Cultural Monument of Albania and is a protected heritage site, although the church and temple building is in need of restoration, held against collapse with wooden props and scaffolding.

== Name ==
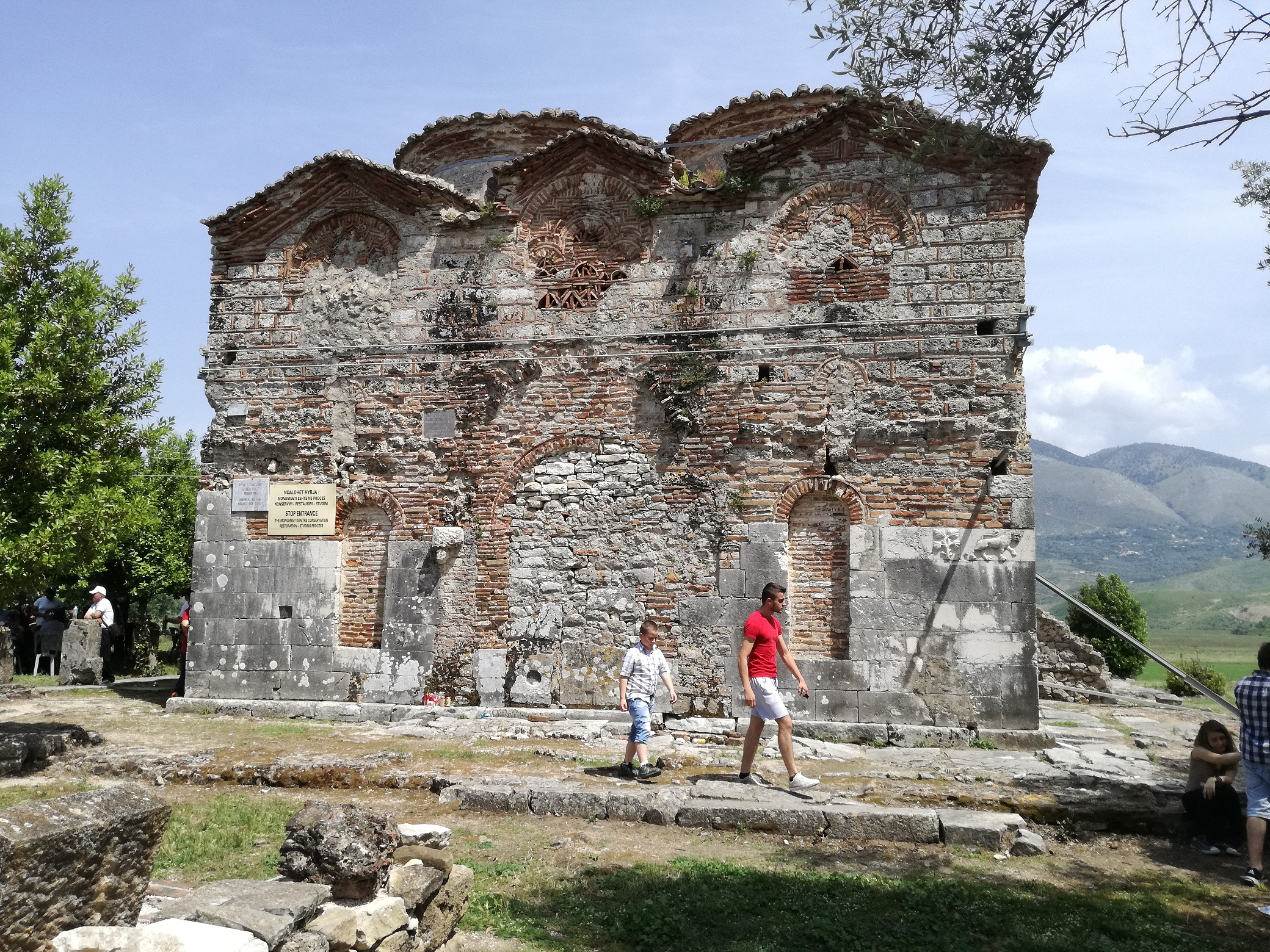
The original temple walls probably date to circa 297 BC

As is immediately evident to speakers of Greek "Agios Nikolaos", Serbian "Sveti Nikola", and the Albanian "Shën Kollit" are the same saint, anglicised to Saint Nicholas. Saint Nicholas was contemporary with Saint Spyridon, the patron saint of the island of Corfu, that lies 20 km west of Mesopotam. Bishops Nicholas and Spyridon both attended the First Council of Nicaea in the year 325. The bodies of both saints were "rescued" and sent by ship to Italy during the Fall of Constantinople in 1453.

The Corfiots successfully petitioned for the body of Saint Spyridon to be relocated to the capital of Corfu. The remains of Saint Nicholas are revered at Bari's great Basilica di San Nicola Italy, in Venice and at Myra in Turkey.

== The Dragon Icons ==
The temple walls contain several legendary icons including a lion, a serpent dragon with a knot in its tail, and a serpent dragon with its tail coiled around its neck and back.

The following information may be co-incidental.

(a) the Iliad refers to Agamemnon as "the Lion" and numerous Roman and Greek authors write that Laocoön, the priest of Troy and his two sons were strangled by a pair of serpent dragons.
(b) The site of Butrint (Roman Buthrotum) has a great gate, referred to as the Lion Gate, whose headstone depicts a bull, possibly Paris, being wrestled to the ground by a lion - possibly Agamemnon.
(c) In 297 BC, the occupants of Butrint and the builders of the temple walls forming Mesopotam Monastery were neighbors.
(d) According to the Roman writer Virgil, Butrint's legendary founder was the seer Helenus, a son of king Priam of Troy, who moved West after the fall of Troy with Neoptolemus and his concubine Andromache.

== Access ==
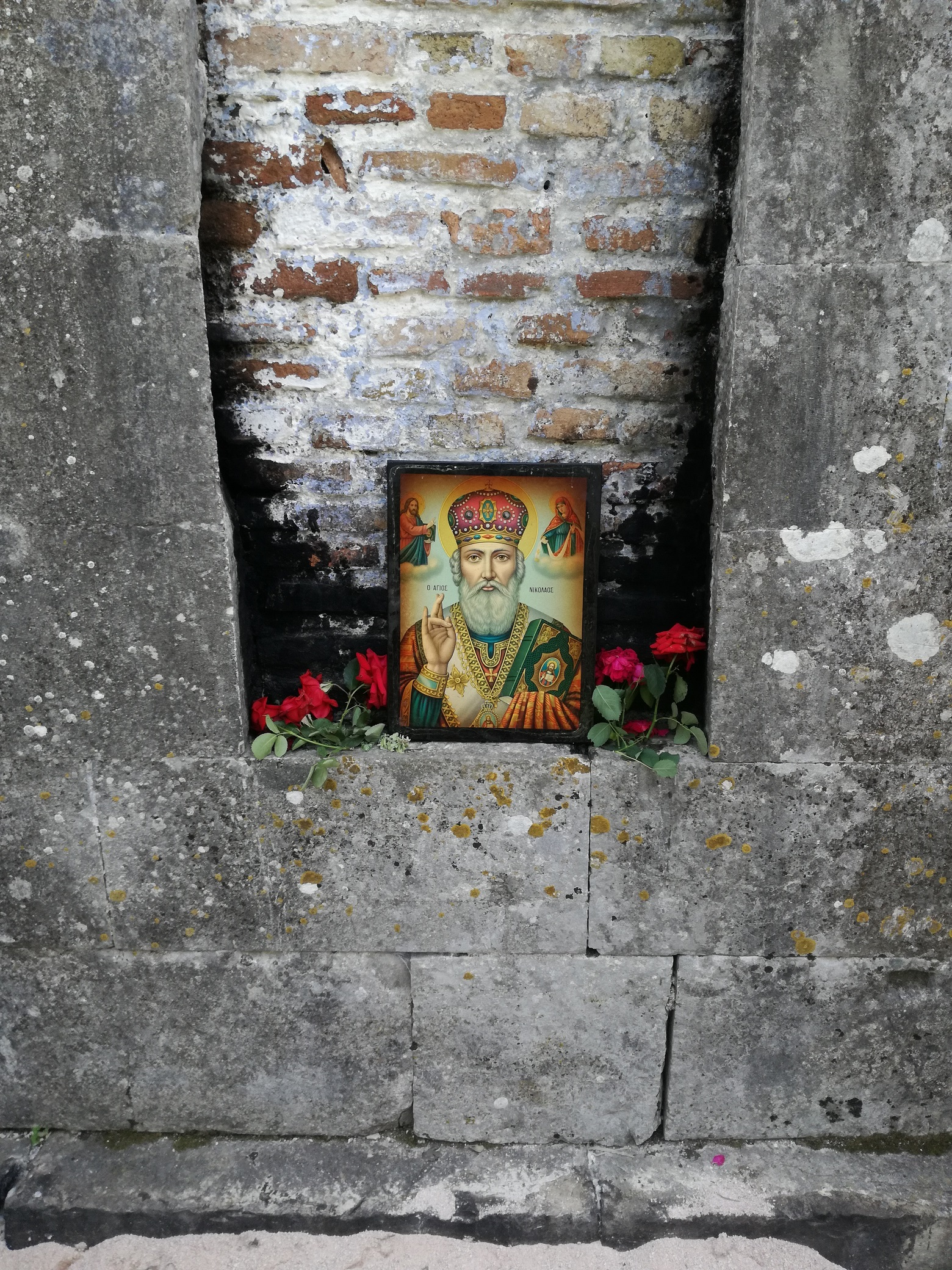
Saint Nicholas the patron saint of Mesopotam monastery.

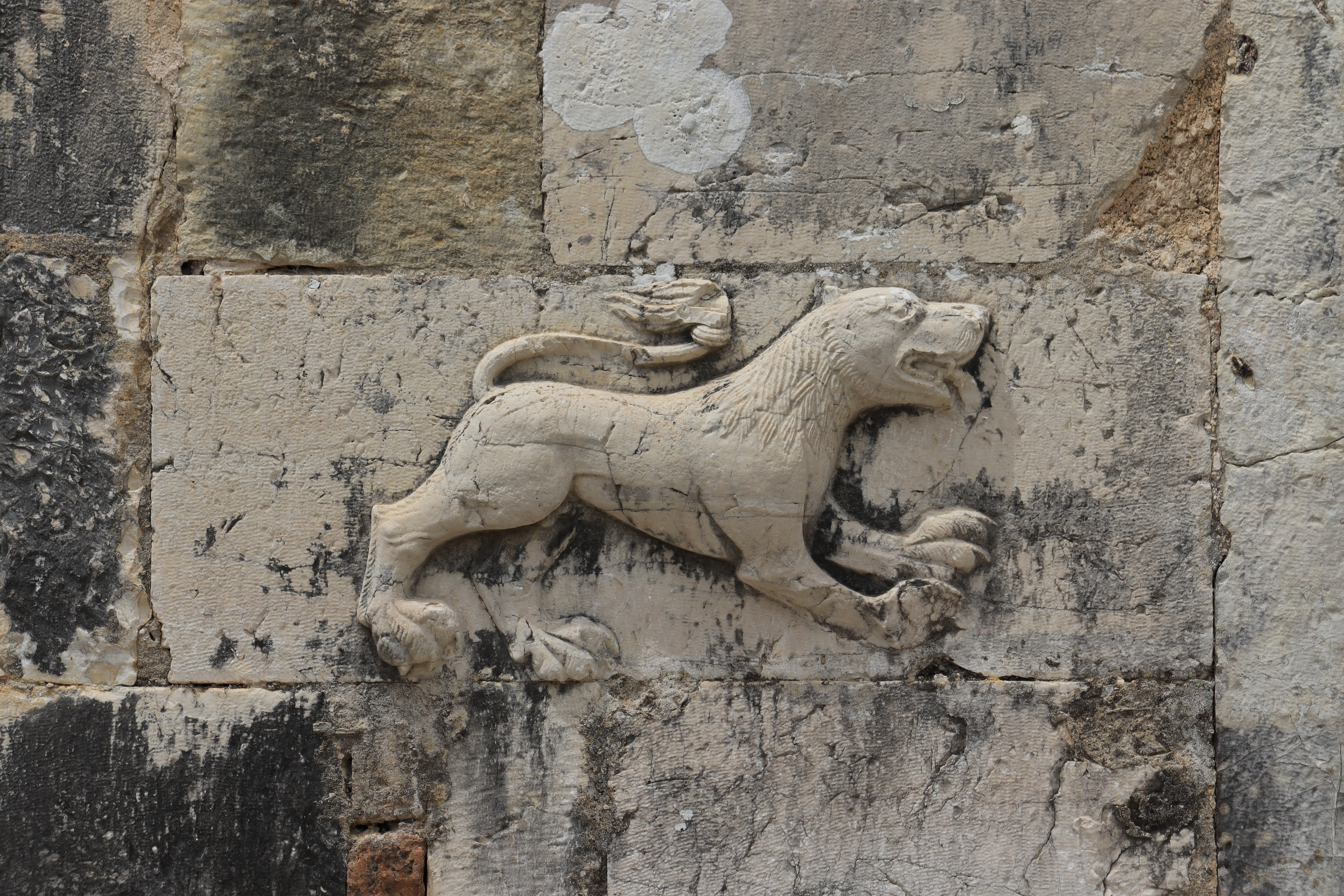
The carving of a Lion.

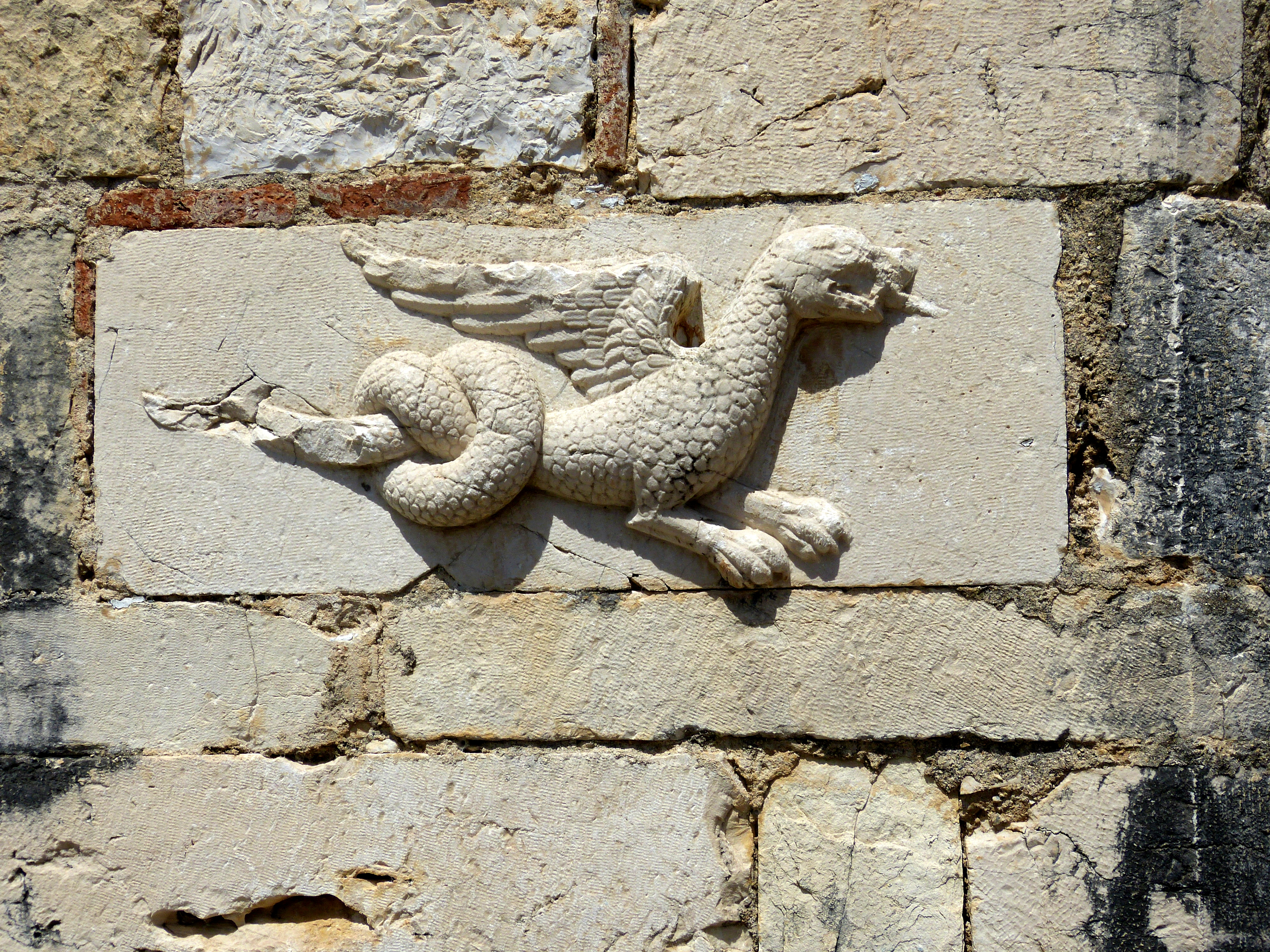
The carving of a serpent dragon with a knot in its tail.

The monastery site is normally closed with fencing and locked gates, but the Papas of the modern Orthodox church in Mespotam has the keys and visits can be arranged if planned and coordinated in advance. In May each year the community of Mesopotam village hold an "open day" and "festival" to celebrate Saint Nicholas's "saint's day" at the site of the monastery.

== See also ==
- Albanian Orthodox Church
