= Muzinë =

Muzinë Μουζίνα
- Village
- Location within Albania
- Coordinates: 39°55′N 20°12′E
- Country: Albania
- County: Vlorë
- Municipality: Finiq
- Administrative unit: Mesopotam
- Time zone: UTC+1 (CET)
  - Summer (DST): UTC+2 (CEST)
- Postal Code: 9717

Muzinë (Albanian definite form: Muzina, Greek: Μουζίνα), is a village of the administrative unit of Mesopotam, Finiq, southern Albania. The village is known for its proximity to the water spring known as the Blue Eye, a popular tourist attraction.

The population of Muzinë is composed of Orthodox Albanian speakers from the late Ottoman period till the late twentieth century. In the twenty first century, although Albanian is the main village language, inhabitants themselves self identify as Greek speakers and some as Greek. Muzinë has undergone extensive depopulation due to the migration of its younger population, and in the early 2020s most of its remaining inhabitants are elderly.

== History ==
A school was established in the village by Greek Orthodox missionary Cosmas of Aetolia (18th century). Greek education was expanded during the late Ottoman era with the establishment of a female school.

In the late Ottoman period, Muzinë was an Albanian speaking village.

During World War II, anti-fascist forces enjoyed tremendous support in Muzinë. From the local anti-fascist forces 35 members were from this village, 7 of which were women. A very large number given its population. The village was bombed on January 14, 1944 by Nazi German forces and almost completely destroyed. Of the 141 houses in the village of Muzina, 138 were blown up with explosives. The village school, one of the largest in the area, was burned down. About 800 head of livestock, beehives, and hundreds of fruit trees were also destroyed.

Muzinë was a Christian Albanian speaking village in the 1960s. Marriages occurred from among its population and with a neighbouring Albanian speaking village, a few with the surrounding Greek speaking villages and inhabitants and none with the neighbouring Greek speaking region of Dropull.

In fieldwork done by Leonidas Kallivretakis in 1992, Muzinë together with Pecë were two villages of the former Mesopotam commune inhabited solely by an Albanian Orthodox population, while the Greek community of Albania inhabited the other villages of the commune.

In 1994, folklorist Fatos Rrapaj recorded from Muzinë locals in Sarandë that the village consisted of the following families: Çiko, Dede, Dardeli, Diamanti, Dumani, Gabici, Gogo, Gjika, Gjino, Koça, Kongo, Konomi, Kotori, Kroti, Kumbe, Lako, Lula, Maneli, Moko, Mitrojorgji, Murxhi, Naçi, Nathanaili, Nika, Prifti, Rumano, Vathi, Verli and Xhuhani.

In the early 2010s, Muzinë's population had substantially decreased due to demographic and migration factors. Although Albanian is the first language used, villagers self-identify as Greek speakers and Orthodox when asked. Muzinë inhabitants hold differing and complex views about Greek or Albanian identity, and villagers who describe themselves as Greek see no clash with an allegiance to Albania. People in Muzinë are bilingual, fluent in both Greek and Albanian and speak either language. Greek is used for religious matters, music, well wishes and interactions with Greek speakers, while Albanian is the main language of Muzinë and the youth usually speak it at home.

Muzinë's population consists of 70 elderly people in the early 2020s. Most houses are abandoned and only forty houses remain inhabited. Due to immigration of the youth to urban centres or abroad, a lack of students has resulted in closure of the school.

Muzinë is among the villages in which members of the ethnic Greek minority reside and are recognized as such by the Albanian authorities.
