= Vermosh (river) =

River in Albania

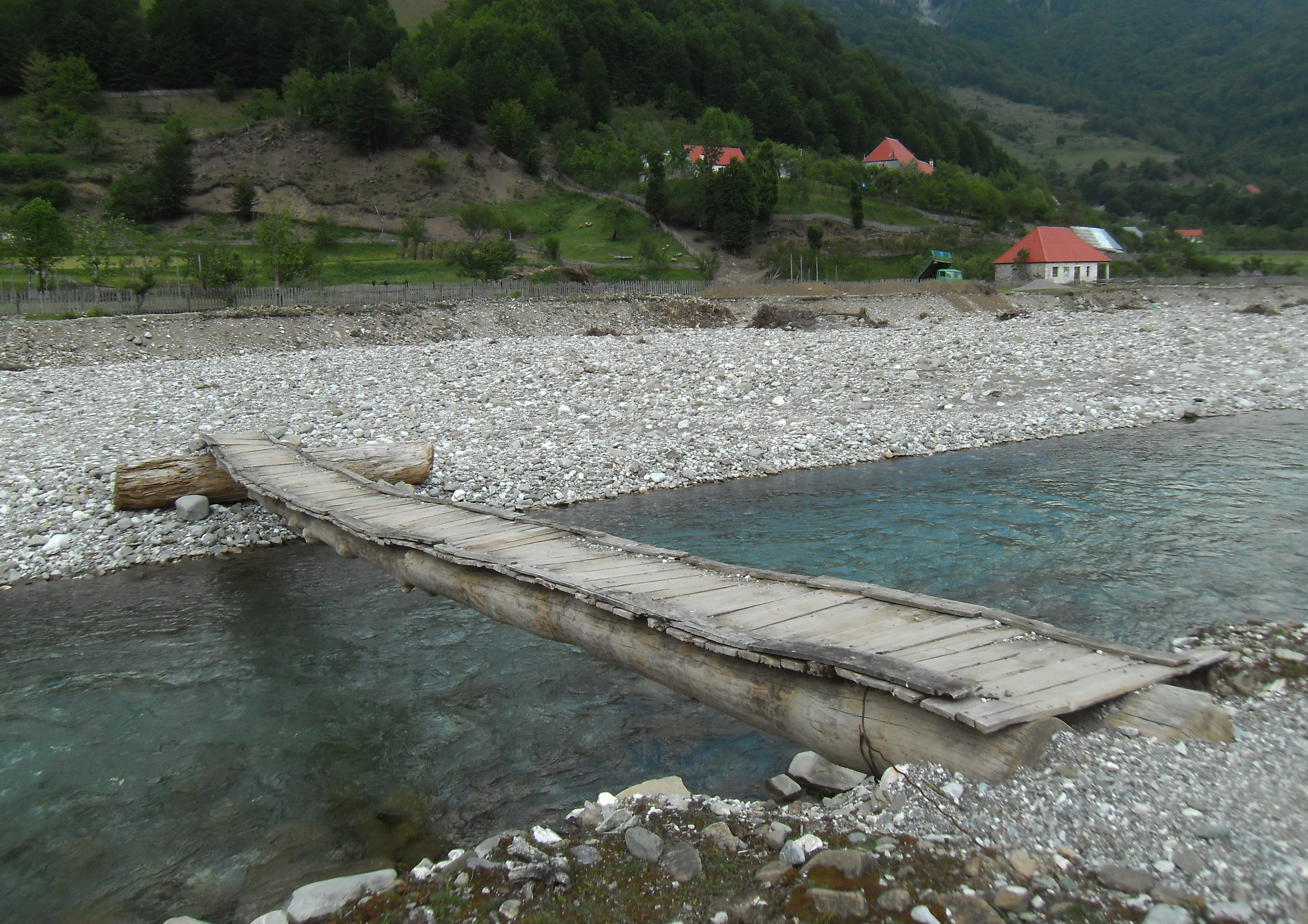
- Wooden bridge hovering above Vermosh river

Location
- Country: Albania, Montenegro

Physical characteristics
- Mouth: Lim
  - coordinates: 42.5908526°N 19.6944342°E
- Length: 20.7 km (12.9 mi)
- Basin size: 142 km^{2} (55 sq mi)
- Discharge
  - average: 4.8 m^{3}/s (170 cu ft/s)

Vermosh is a river of the Albanian Alps, in northern Albania. It drains the Vermosh Valley in the region of Kelmend before crossing into Montenegro, where it forms part of the upper Lim drainage basin, a major tributary of the Danube.

== Course ==
The Vermosh basin covers an area of approximately 142 km², of which 88.8 km² lie within Albania, while the remainder extends into neighbouring Montenegro.

At a length of 20.7 km, the river originates from the confluence of the Vucin Potok and Skrobotushë streams. The former, considered the principal headwater, descends through a steep and deeply incised mountain valley before joining Skrobotushë. From their confluence, the river flows through the Vermosh Valley, following a generally eastward course.

Near the Albanian–Montenegrin border, Vermosh receives the waters of the Lepushë stream from the right bank. It subsequently traverses a narrow gorge before entering the Gusinje Plain. Downstream, its waters merge with the Lim river system, which ultimately drains into the Danube and Black Sea.

== Hydrology ==
The Vermosh basin is underlain predominantly by flysch deposits, along with extensive limestone formations and volcanic rocks. These geological conditions have contributed to the development of a dense hydrographic network composed of numerous streams, springs and karst water sources.

Its high water yield is sustained by substantial precipitation and prolonged winter snow cover at higher elevations. As a result, the Vermosh is among the most water-rich rivers of the Albanian Alps.

At the point where it leaves Albanian territory, the river has an average annual discharge of approximately 4.8 m³/s, corresponding to a specific runoff of about 43.2 l/s/km².

== Drainage basin ==
- ◆ flowing through Montenegro

Vermosh

  - Vucin Potok 〜
    - Përroi i Mullive
  - Skrobotushë
    - Pojanicë
  - Jaçiçë
  - Roshavej
  - Përroi i Gjemve
  - Inish
  - Përroi i Pjetër Nikës
  - Lepushë

== See also ==
- List of rivers of Albania
