= List of rivers of Albania =

An incomplete map of Albania's river network

Albania possesses a dense hydrographic network of 152 principal rivers. Its drainage system is dominated by ten major rivers flowing from southeast to northwest, mainly discharging towards the Adriatic Sea and partly into the Ionian coast. Combined, they produce a total annual flow rate of 1,308 cubic metres per second (46,200 cu ft/s).

In the mountainous regions, the rivers meander through narrow valleys with steep banks and great depth, collecting streams and silt during heavy rains. Their beds become erosive, causing frequent changes in their paths.

The rivers are mainly fed by atmospheric precipitation (65-92%) and underground water (8-35%), with an average rainfall layer of 1,494 mm and a runoff layer of 945 mm. Water flow varies by season, with winter having the largest annual flow (40%), followed by spring, autumn and summer. The rivers contain an average mineralization of 150 to 500 mg/L and an average annual volume of suspended solids of 60 million tons, with greater erosion occurring in the catchment basins of Osum, Devoll and Erzen. Temperatures in the winter months fall to 3.5-8.9°C, and in the summer months reach 17.8-24.6°C.

== Drainage basins ==
- ◆ flowing through Montenegro / North Macedonia
- ◆ flowing through Kosovo / Greece

=== Adriatic Sea ===
- Buna 〜
  - Drin 〜 〜
    - Kir
    - Valbona
      - Bushtricë
      - Gashi
    - Curraj
      - Pejë
    - Shala
      - Theth
    - Sapaç
    - Gjadër
      - Gjeden
      - Vomës
    - White Drin 〜
      - Luma
      - Krumë
      - Skatinë
      - Vlahëna
    - Black Drin 〜 〜
      - Bushtricë
      - Molla e Lurës
      - Veleshticë
      - Seta
      - Zalli i Bulqizës
      - Okshtun
        - Borova
          - Moglicë
- Mat
  - Fan
    - Fan i Madh
      - Fan i Vogël
      - Zmeja e Madhe
      - Dibri
  - Kurvaj
  - Uraka
    - Shulrejë
  - Zalli i Melihit
  - Stana
- Ishmi
  - Budullë
  - Gjolë
    - Zeza
  - Tërkuza
  - Lumi i Tiranës
    - Lana
  - Shupal
    - Zall-Bastar
    - Selitë
- Erzen
  - Qafëmollë
  - Murdhar
  - Zhullimë
  - Pezë
- Shkumbin
  - Llëngë
  - Dunshë
  - Radicinë
  - Bushtricë
  - Rapuni
    - Zalli i Gjurait
      - Shmili
    - Zalli i Kostenjës
      - Shkenbini
  - Gostimë
    - Lumi i Qershive
  - Papri
  - Lesticë
  - Rumli
- Seman
  - Devoll
    - Zalli i Gostimës
    - Holli
    - Tomorricë
    - Vërça
    - Lumi i Malsisë
    - Strelcë
    - Selca
      - Verba
    - Velçan
      - Lumi i Thellë
    - Osnat
      - Niçë
    - Janishtë
    - Moçan
      - Lumi i Dardhës
      - Dëshmirë
        - Lumi i Tufës
    - Grendë e Gomarit
    - Çajkovicë
    - Naguraji
    - Plevisht
      - Gjyras
      - Bickë
    - Lum i Madh
      - Pejkas
        - Beras
    - Goçë
    - Regë
    - Novoselë
    - Dunavec
      - Kloçë
      - Lumi i Vjetër
      - Bozdovec
      - Voskop
        - Stenë
        - Radë
        - Shallër
      - Guritzi
      - Stershoi
      - Voskop
  - Osum
    - Lapardha
      - Bardhaj
        - Lumas
      - Pëllumbas
        - Belesovë
    - Velabisht
    - Gjeroven
      - Molisht
      - Plashnik
    - Zagorë
      - Lagjas
    - Vodicë
      - Novë
        - Bovë
        - Roshnik
      - Dukovë
    - Karkanjoz
    - Vërtop
      - Tomori
    - Vokopolë
    - Çorovodë
      - Osojë
        - Vlushë
    - Malind
    - Staraveckë
    - Treskë
    - Kallovesh
      - Zharkan
    - Gostivisht
    - Lum i Madh
      - Mulliri
    - Arapë
      - Elmicë
    - Konopishtë
    - Karavidhë
  - Gjanica
    - Lumarë
    - Metoh
- Vjosa 〜
  - Sarantaporos 〜
  - Voidomatis 〜
  - Çarçovë
  - Darsi
  - Lengaricë
    - Gostivisht
    - Ani
    - Piskal
    - Rodom
    - Dedovë
    - Peshtanicë
    - Osnat
    - Barmash
    - Podë
  - Lumicë
    - Lum i Turbullt
    - Leminjiza
  - Shlikë
  - Dishnicë
  - Zagorie
  - Drino 〜
    - Gjarakar
    - Kardhiq
      - Kollopanas
      - Cullunarët
      - Piriu
        - Panja
      - Gugash
      - Gjoshnikosh
        - Valet
      - Vexhisht
    - Nimicë
    - Suha
      - Gryka e Selckës
        - Selckë
    - Bënça
      - Gura
  - Shushicë
    - Smokthina
    - Kaur
    - Shuri i Kuçit

=== Ionian Sea ===
- Bistricë
  - Vrisi
  - Kardhikaq
  - Navaricë
  - Buazë
  - Kalasa
    - Delvinë
  - Galisht
- Pavlla 〜
  - Bërkuç
  - Leshnicë
  - Barrçi

=== Other rivers ===
Danube → Black Sea

- Lim 〜
  - Vermosh

Mainstream rivers

Cem ↝ Cemi i Selcës 〜, Gomsiqe, Drojë, Darçi, Çërravë, Izvori ↝ Dukat, Borsh, Gurra e Vërgoit, Gjovarakë.

== Gallery ==
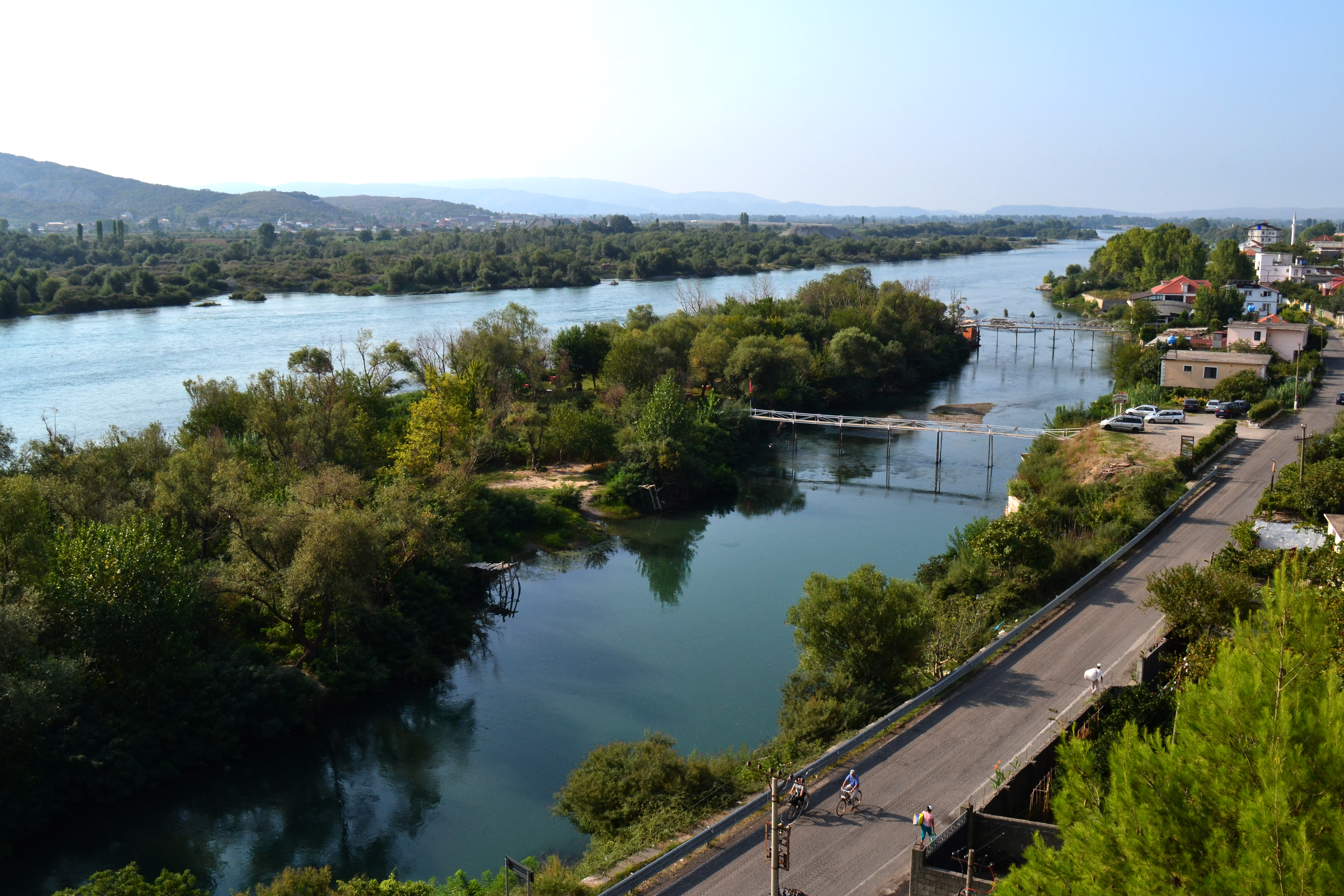
The Buna River at its outlet from Lake Shkodër

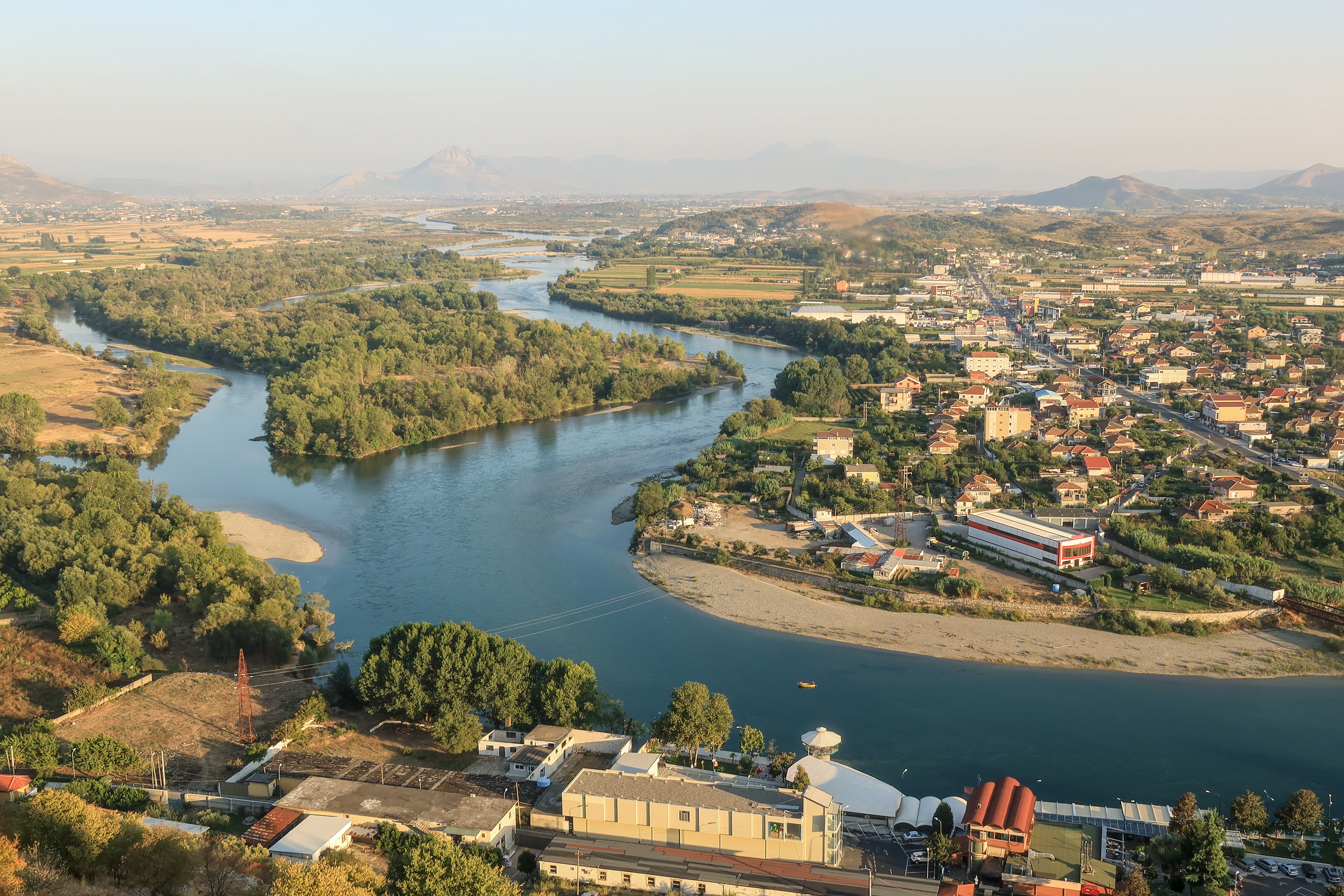
The Drin River near Shkodër

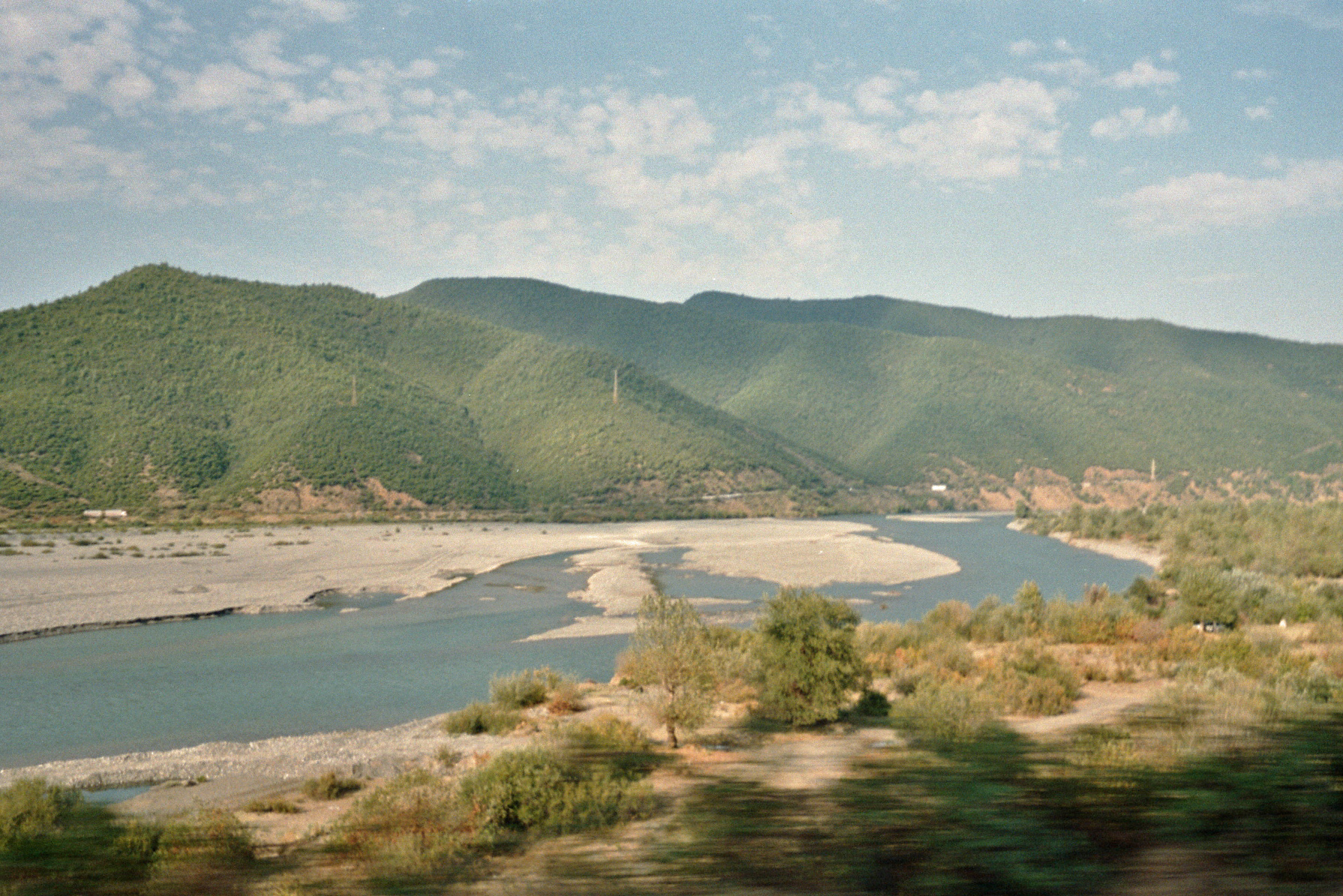
The lower course of the Mat River

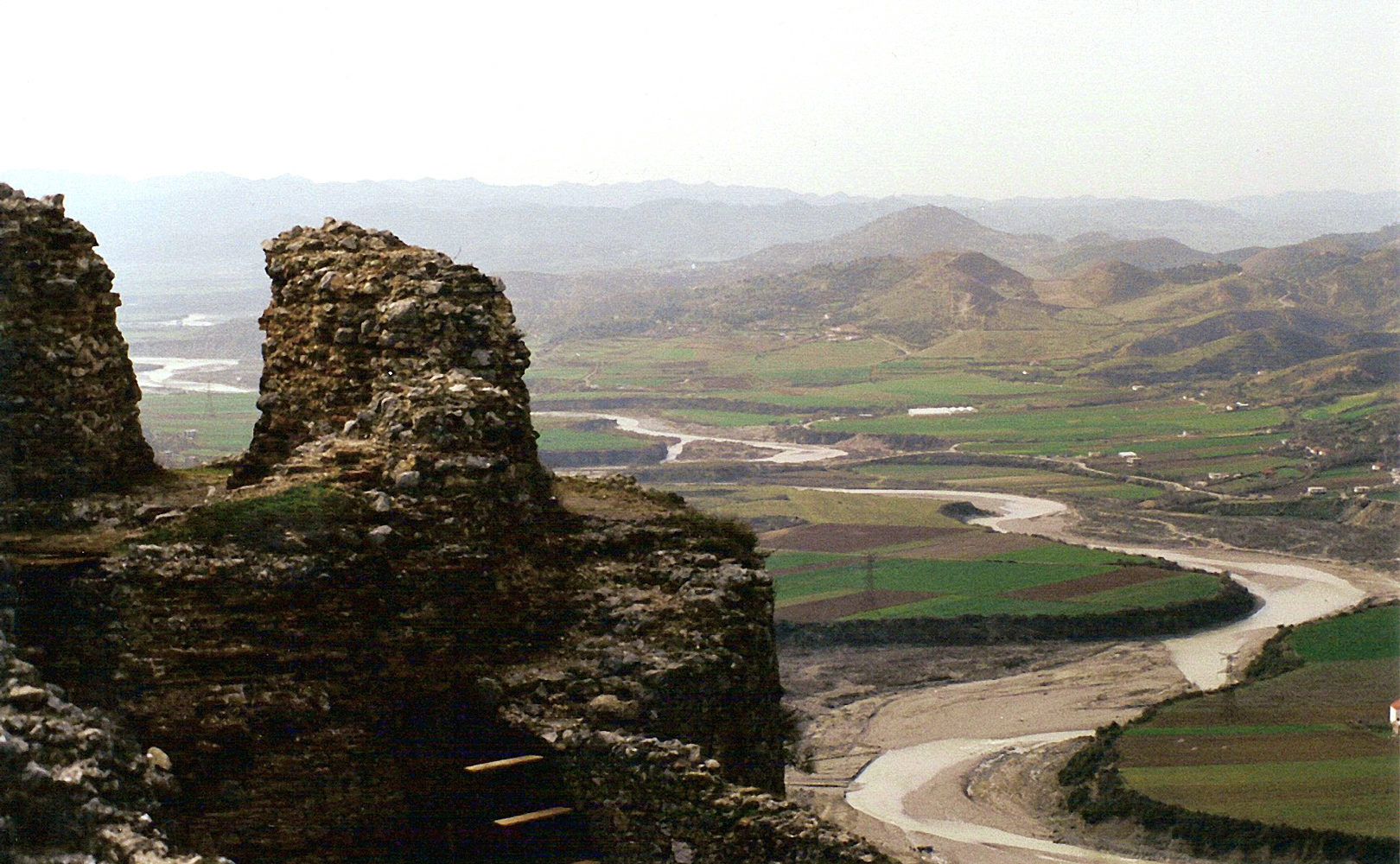
The Erzen River near Petrelë

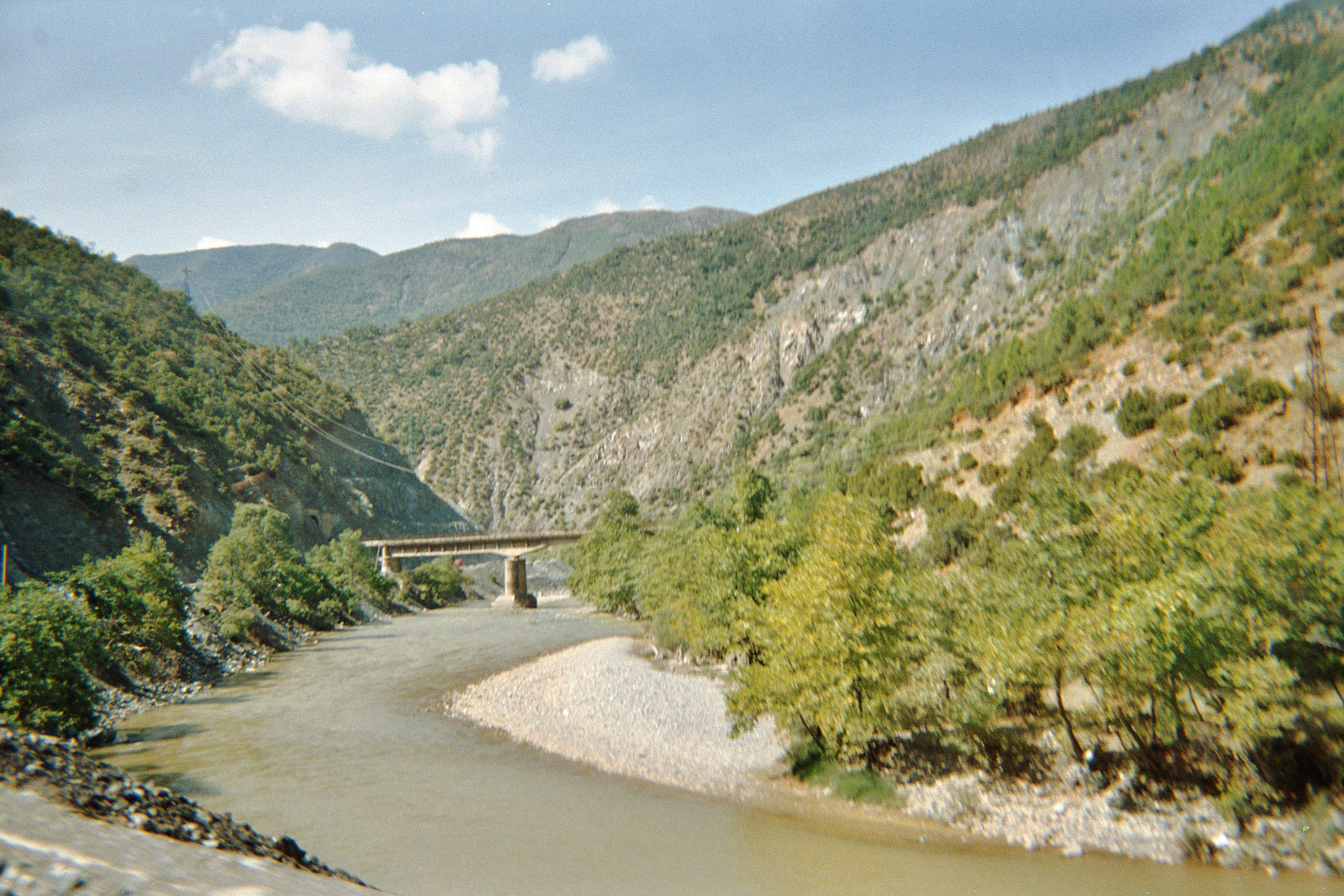
The Shkumbin River

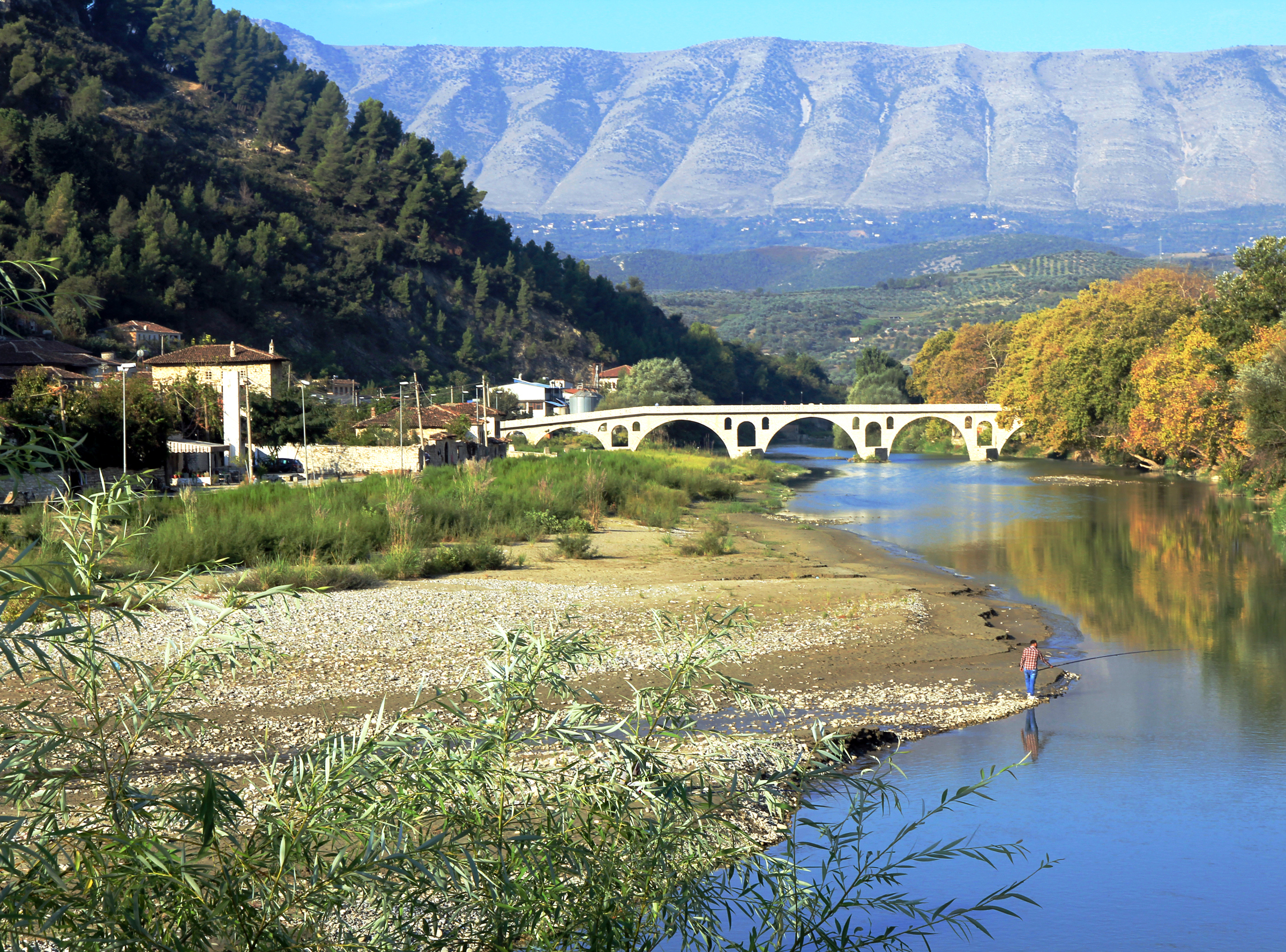
The Osum River flowing through Berat beneath the Gorica Bridge

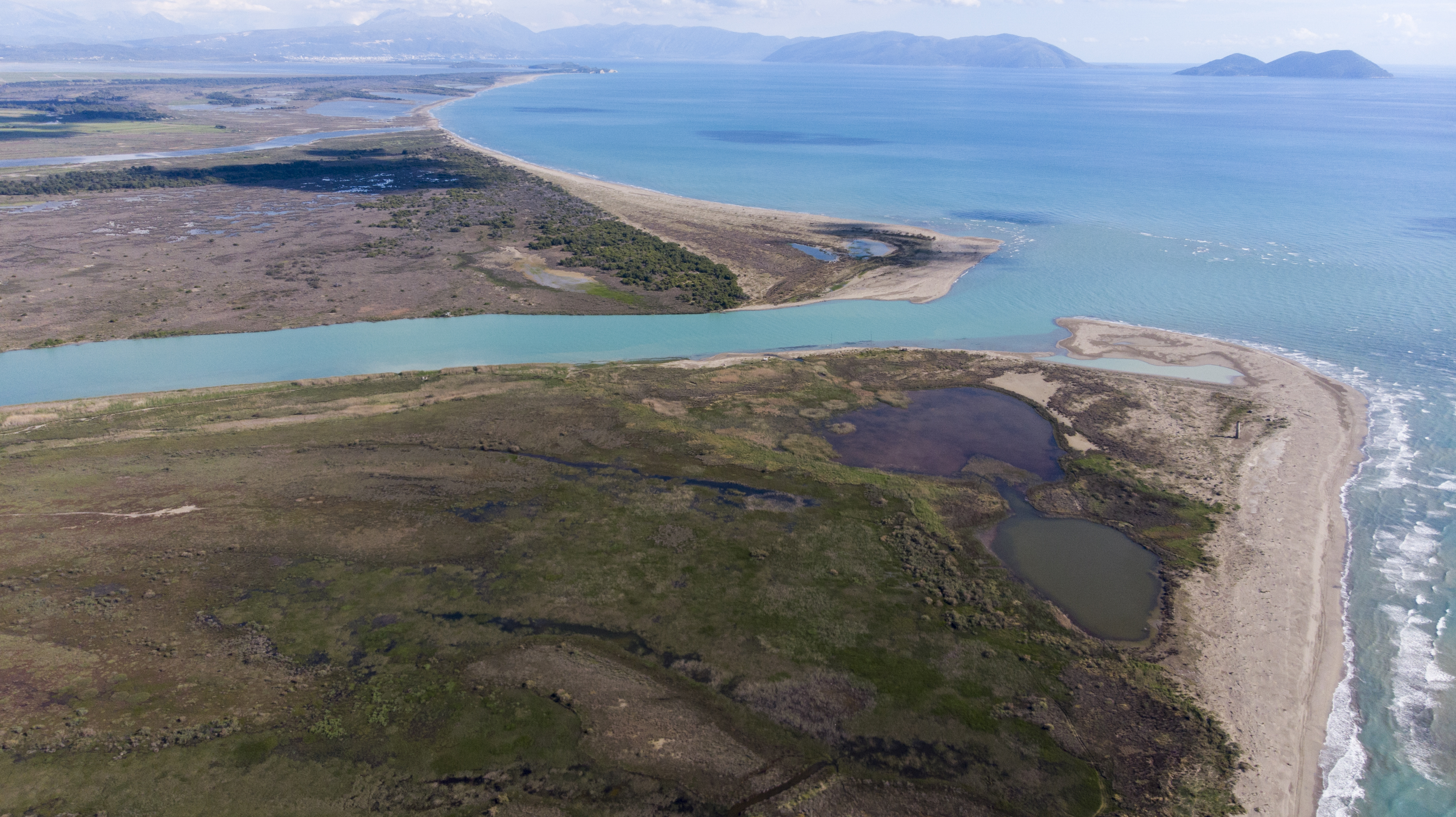
The mouth of the Vjosa River at the Adriatic Sea

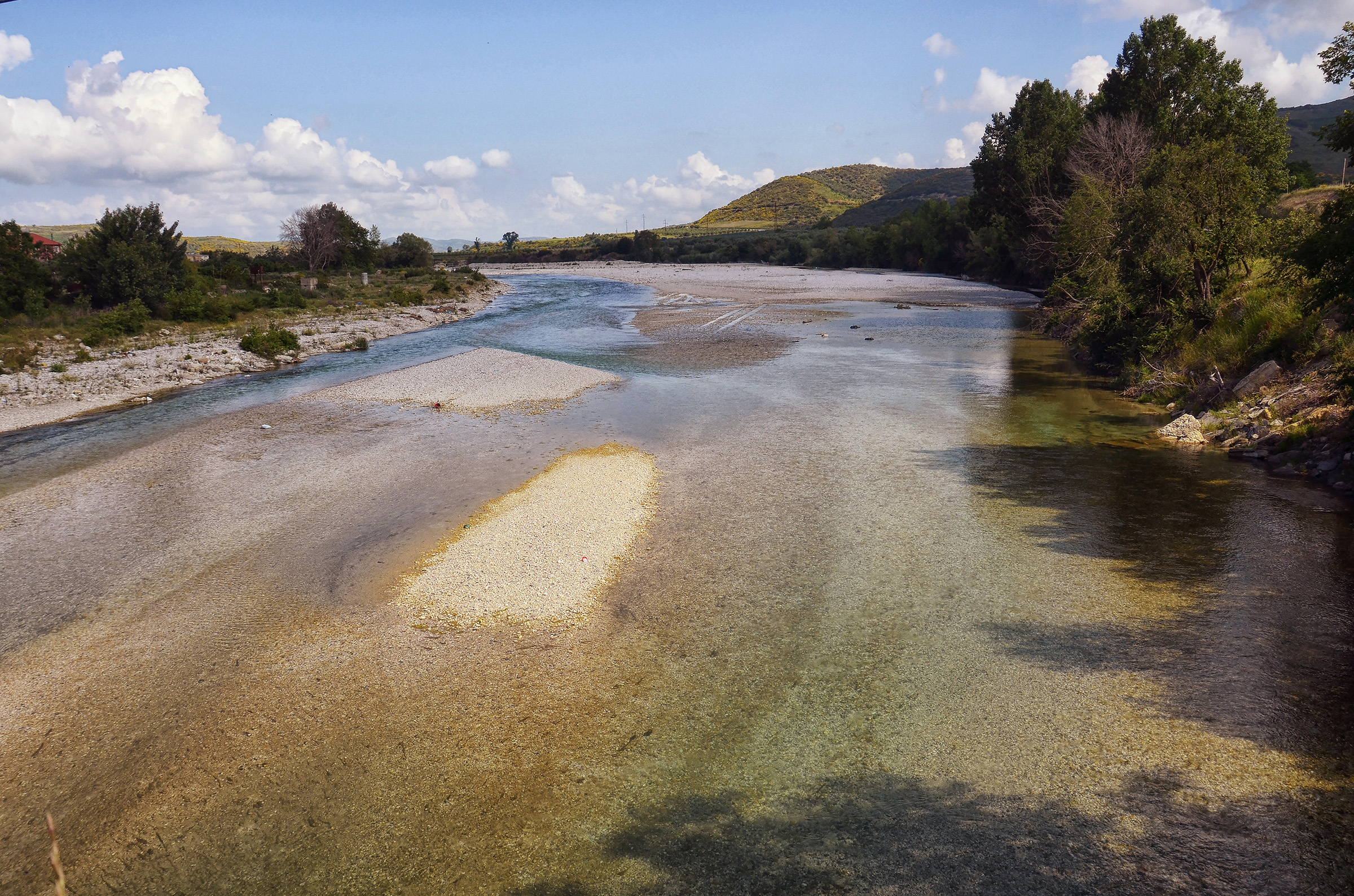
The Shushicë River near Drashovicë

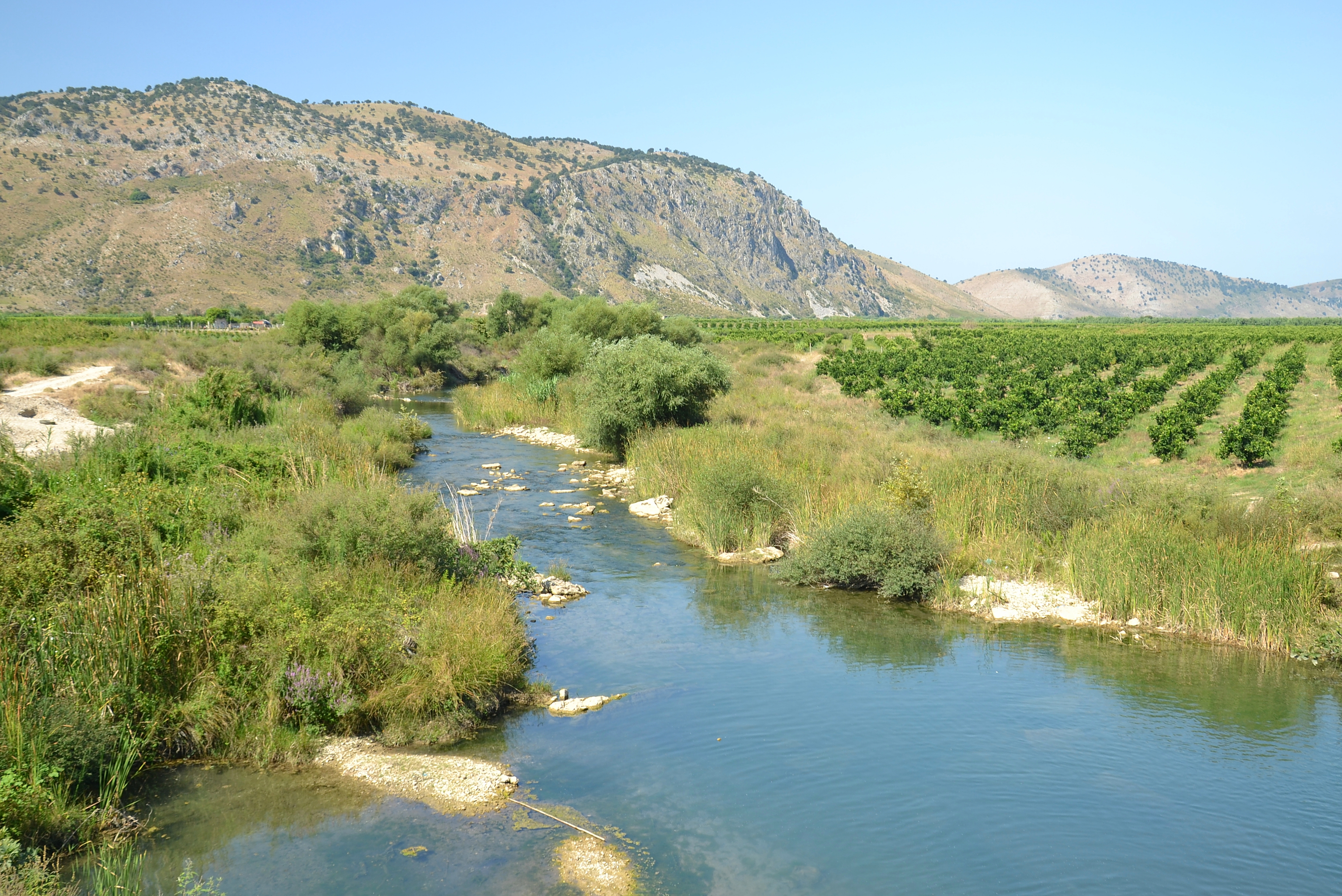
The Pavlla River in southern Albania

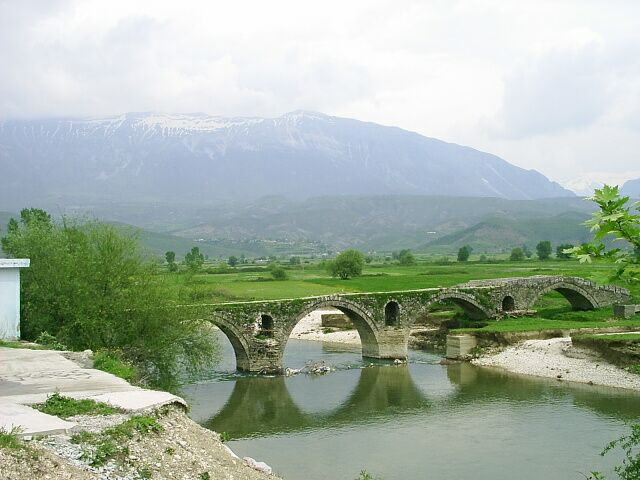
The Drino River near Gjirokastër

== See also ==
- Protected areas of Albania
- Biodiversity of Albania
