= Blue Eye, Albania =

Water spring and natural phenomenon

Coordinates: 39°55′25″N 20°11′34″E

Blue Eye
- Syri i Kaltër
- IUCN category III (natural monument or feature)
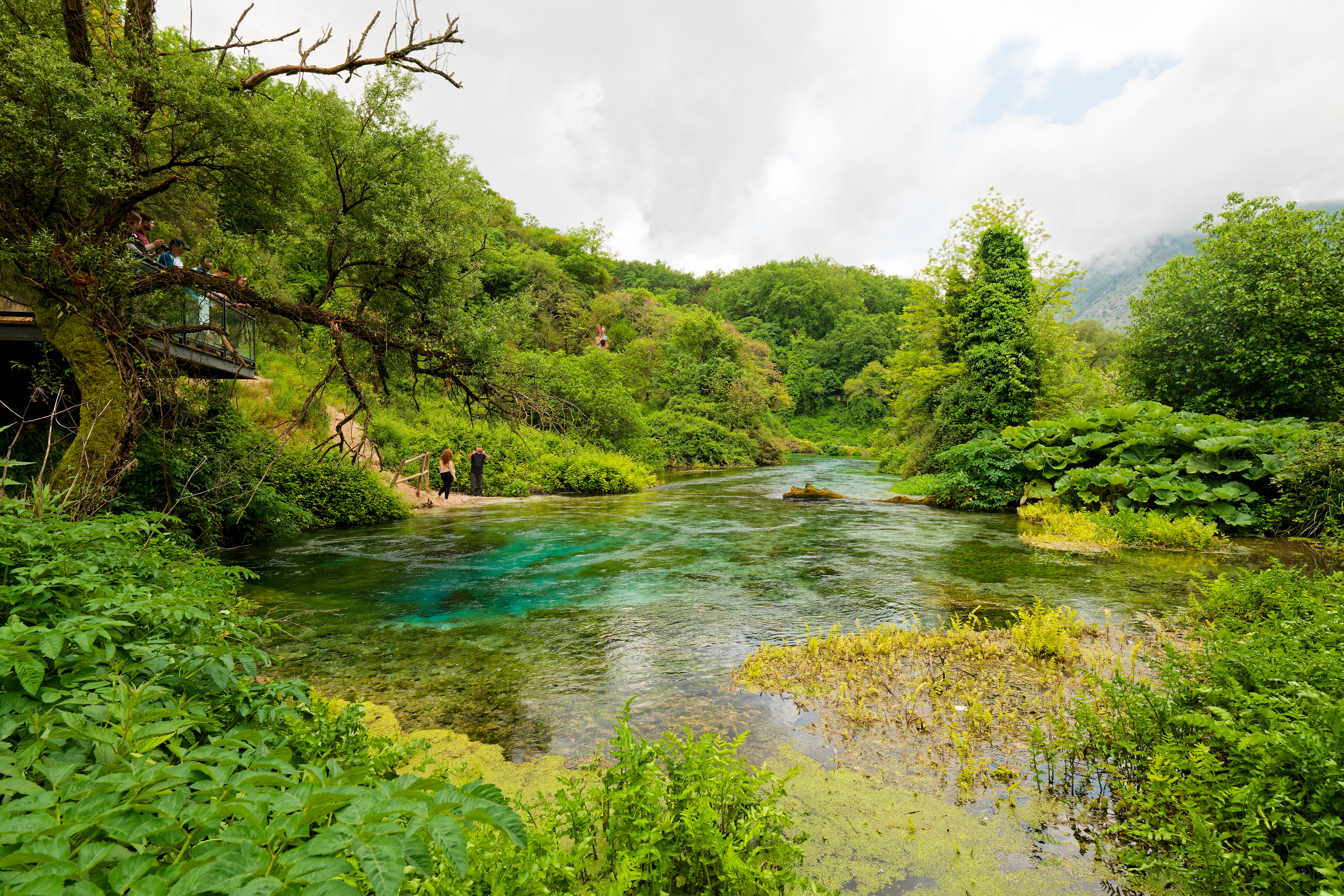
- View of the Blue Eye

- Location within Albania
- Location: Muzinë, Finiq, Vlorë County
- Nearest city: Delvinë, Sarandë
- Area: 1.8
- Designation: Natural Monument
- Designated: 1996
- Governing body: Ministry of Environment

The Blue Eye (Albanian: Syri i Kaltër) is a water spring and natural phenomenon occurring in the village of Muzinë in Finiq municipality, southern Albania. A popular tourist attraction, the clear blue water of the river can be seen from a depth of more than fifty metres. Divers have descended to fifty metres, but it is still unclear what the actual depth of the karst hole is.

This phenomenon is also known as "springs of Bistricë" as it is the initial water source of Bistricë river, 25 km long, which ends in the Ionian Sea south of Sarandë. The source stands at an altitude of 152 m and has a discharge rate of 18400 L/s.

The immediate area 1.8 km^{2} (0.69 sq mi) is a Nature Monument and is characterized by oak and sycamore trees. In summer 2004, the source was temporarily dried up.

In the summer of 2017 part of the location was burnt by wildfire.

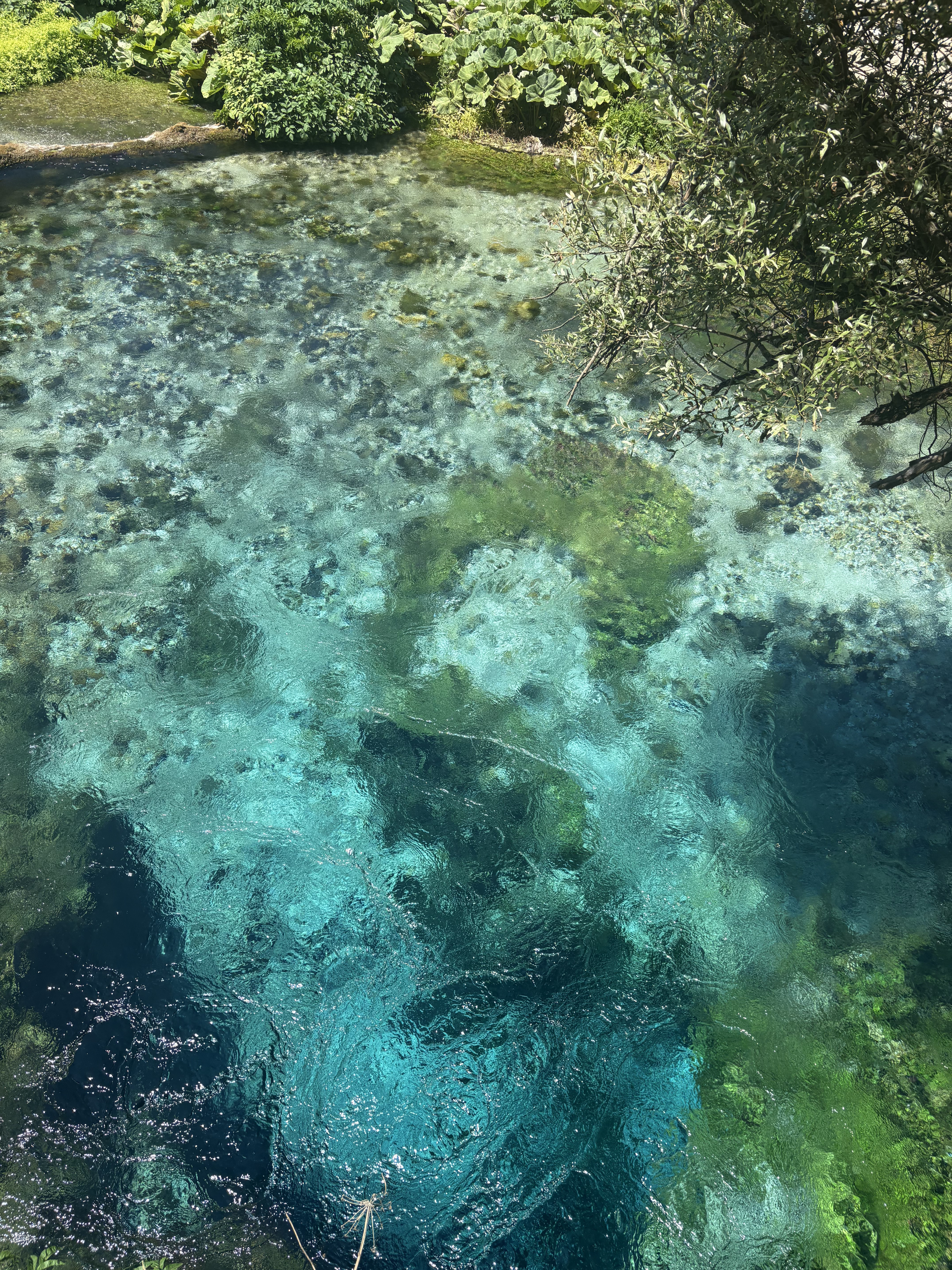
The Blue Eye (Syri i Kaltër) in Albania in June

The protected area of Blue Eye has been designated as a natural monument which covers an area of 180 ha.

Upwelling water of the Blue Eye forming the Bistricë River

The Blue Eye is located slightly west of the village of Muzinë, but it can be reached by car reaching the Saranda-Gjirokaster road from the village of Krongj.

== See also ==
- Protected areas of Albania
- Geography of Albania
- Tourism in Albania
