= Dunsha =

River in Albania

Location
- Country: Albania

Physical characteristics
- Source
  - location: Kalivaç
  - coordinates: 40°54′39″N 20°32′23″E
- Mouth: Shkumbin

Dunsha is a river in eastern Albania and a tributary of the Shkumbin River. It drains a large portion of the Mokra highlands, collecting waters from numerous mountain streams and valleys before joining Shkumbin north of the village of Çezma e Vogël at an elevation of approximately 534 m (1,752 ft).

== Course ==
The Dunsha originates in the mountainous terrain of Mokra, where a network of streams descends from the surrounding ridges and peaks. Its basin encompasses waters flowing from the areas of Trebinjë, Povelan, Potkozhan and Kalivaç, as well as streams originating near Guri i Bardhë and Dunicë. The watershed extends across broader uplands bounded by the mountain ridges leading toward Qafa e Panjës and Guri i Kamjes.

One of its main tributaries is the Homçan Stream, which rises at an elevation of approximately 1,344 m (4,409 ft). After joining the Upper Selcë Stream, it contributes significantly to the flow of the Dunsha River. The adjacent Homçan Valley collects runoff from the slopes of Mount Korija (1,343 m), while the nearby Homezh Valley drains the mountainous arc formed by Fusha e Madhe (1,429 m), Shullëri i Kaprit (1,343 m) and Ahishta e Gegës (1,513 m).

Flowing generally westward through the rugged landscape of Mokër, the river eventually reaches the Shkumbin River basin, into which it discharges near Çezma e Vogël.

== Drainage basin ==
The Dunsha basin is characterized by steep mountain slopes, narrow valleys and numerous perennial and seasonal streams fed by precipitation and snowmelt from the surrounding highlands.

The river’s catchment is bordered by several prominent geographic landmarks, including Mount Lenie, Qafa e Mushkës and Guri i Kamjes. The latter, rising to 1,461 m (4,793 ft), is a frequently visited natural monument.

== See also ==
- List of rivers of Albania
