= Kostar =

Kostar Κωστάρι
- Village
- Location within Albania
- Coordinates: 39°55′51″N 20°06′04″E
- Country: Albania
- County: Vlorë
- Municipality: Finiq
- Elevation: 350 m (1,150 ft)
- Time zone: UTC+1 (CET)
  - Summer (DST): UTC+2 (CEST)

Kostar (Albanian definite form: Kostari; Greek: Κωστάρι; romanized: Kostári) is a village in Vlorë County, southern Albania. At the 2015 local government reform it became part of the municipality of Delvinë.

== Name ==
Kostar is from either the word кость, kosty meaning 'bone', where as a placename it referred to the bone-shaped relief of the area and possibly derived from the Bulgarian кост, kost 'bone' and the suffix -ан, -an. Linguist Xhelal Ylli writes the stress on the first syllable speaks against -ан, -an formation, and furthermore, the identification is uncertain. Or the toponym is from the Albanian word kosë meaning 'scythe', borrowed from Slavic and the suffix -tar where Ylli states the designation also seems more convincing from a semantical perspective.

== Demographics ==
Kostar (Kostana) is recorded in the Ottoman defter of 1583 as a village in the Sanjak of Delvina with a total of 178 recorded male representatives, 150 of which were household heads and the remaining 28 being bachelors. The overwhelming majority of anthroponymy recorded in the settlement belonged to the Albanian onomastic sphere (e.g., Gjon Pjetri, Gjin Pali, Dedë Bardhi, Lekë Kola), with a minority bearing general Christian personal names - some of which belonged to the Greek Orthodox sphere (e.g., Jano Dhimo, Andrea Dhima, Dhimo Ilia). Two Muslims were also recorded among the inhabitants of the village: Murat Gjini, and Hasan Murati.

According to Ottoman statistics, the village had 86 inhabitants in 1895. The village is inhabited by Greeks and the population was 328 in 1992.
