= Ardhasovë =

Ardhasovë Αρδάσοβα
- Village
- Location within Albania
- Coordinates: 39°52′45″N 20°7′6″E
- Country: Albania
- County: Vlorë
- Municipality: Finiq
- Elevation: 252 m (827 ft)
- Time zone: UTC+1 (CET)
  - Summer (DST): UTC+2 (CEST)

Ardhasovë (Albanian definite form: Ardhasova, Greek: Αρδάσοβα) is a village in Vlorë County, southern Albania. At the 2015 local government reform it became part of the municipality of Finiq.

== Name ==
Linguist Yordan Zaimov reconstructs the toponym as Радашово, Radashovo. Linguist Xhelal Ylli states the reconstruction is uncertain, although the Slavic possessive suffix indicates that a Slavic name giver must be considered. The root is unclear. In Albanian, there is ardhas and ardhacak meaning newcomer, a formation from the verb vij 'to come': erdha 'came': kam ardhur 'have come' and Ylli writes the placename is a hybrid formation.

== Demographics ==
The village is inhabited by Greeks and the population was 258 in 1992.
