= Vurg =

- Region
- Location within Albania
- Coordinates: 39°48′16″N 20°4′17″E
- Country: Albania
- County: Vlorë County
- District: Sarandë District
- Time zone: UTC+1 (Central European Time)
  - Summer (DST): UTC+2 (CEST)
- Car Plates: SR

Vurg (Albanian definite form: Vurgu; Greek: Βούργος Vourgos or Βούρκος Vourkos) is a plain and region in the southern part of Vlorë County, southwestern Albania.

== Name ==
The toponym means marshland, in both Albanian and Greek. Before bonification works in the Communism period, most of the Vurg area was covered with marshes. When it rained, the Kalasë and Bistrica rivers increased the marsh area even further.

== History ==
At the archaic era of antiquity the winter pastures of the Vurg plain were controlled by the Ancient Greek tribe of the Chaonians when the later reached their peak of power. The main city of the Chaonians, Phoenice was located at the center of the plain of Vurg.

In the 14th-15th centuries, the area was under the control of Tocco, Zenebishi and Arianiti families. In 1431, Vurg's field was part of the Sanjak of Albania in the Ottoman Empire. According to Ottoman register data, in 1520, the number of families in Vurg villages was 207.

Ottoman notebooks of the 17th century testify that their then inhabitants bore characteristic Albanian names, such as: Lekë, Gjon (John), Gjin (a typical Albanian variant of the name John), Gjergj (George) etc. Based on such historical indications and onomatology Bardhyl Demiraj expresses reservations about the possibility of an early Greek presence and says that the majority of today's local Greek-speaking inhabitants are descended from those who came or were employed as farmers from the southernmost Greek-speaking villages there from the end of the 18th to the beginning of the 19th century. This can also be witnessed in the toponymy of some of the villages such as Vrion, Kasemallajbej, Ymerefend, Memushbej etc. Nevertheless Demiraj expresses the need for further research on the issue. Aristotelis Spyrou and Doris Kyriazis say that the main basic disadvantage in Demiraj's research is his unawareness of the Greek research conducted on the issue.

In the 18th and 19th centuries Vurg was used as a winter pasture by Lab Albanians. In the late 18th century the Vurg field became property of the Delvina family led by Selim Pasha. It was common for the inhabitants of Vurg to sell their products in the markets of Delvinë and Konispol, the former being the center of Sanjak of Delvina.

Greek Sarakatsani communities used to have their winter pastures in the plain of Vurg.

During World War II, more than 15 young men from Vurg enrolled into the Chameria Battalion; part of the National Liberation Movement of Albania, but this battalion seized to operate as a unit already from November 1943. Among those men was Lefter Talo who became the main figure of communist resistance in Vurg and supported the cooperation of the Greek community with the Albanian National Liberation Movement. Two out of the three National Liberation Front battalions that consisted of Greek minority members were formed in Vurg: "Lefter Talo" and "Padeli Boçari".

== Demographics ==
Vurg is among the main settlement areas of Greeks in Albania. A total of 44 settlements in the area are inhabited by ethnic Greeks, while Albania's Greek community in general has preserved its own ethnic, linguistic religious identity and tradition and also been relatively integrated into the Albanian society.

The Greek language spoken in Vurg belongs to the same idiom with that of nearby Dropull.
