= Velahovë =

Velahovë Βελιάχοβο
- Village
- Location within Albania
- Coordinates: 39°54′9″N 20°9′5″E
- Country: Albania
- County: Vlorë
- Municipality: Finiq
- Elevation: 595 m (1,952 ft)
- Time zone: UTC+1 (CET)
  - Summer (DST): UTC+2 (CEST)

Velahovë (Albanian definite form: Velahova, Greek: Βελιάχοβο) is a village in Vlorë County, southern Albania. At the 2015 local government reform it became part of the municipality of Finiq.

== Name ==
The toponym Velahovë is either derived from an ethnic name влах, Vlah meaning 'Aromanian'; or based on older evidence it is from a personal name Велих(о), Velih(o) from the Bulgarian dialectal word вели, veli meaning 'great, high' and the suffix -ов-а, ov-a.

== Demographics ==
The village is inhabited by Greeks and the population was 142 in 1992.
