= Kardhikaq =

Kardhikaq Γαρδικάκι
- Village
- Location within Albania
- Coordinates: 39°57′02″N 20°09′54″E
- Country: Albania
- County: Vlorë
- Municipality: Finiq
- Elevation: 320 m (1,050 ft)
- Time zone: UTC+1 (CET)
  - Summer (DST): UTC+2 (CEST)

Kardhikaq (Albanian definite form: Kardhikaqi; Greek: Γαρδικάκι; romanized: Gardikáki) is a small village in Vlorë County, southern Albania. At the 2015 local government reform it became part of the municipality of Finiq.

== Demographics ==
According to Ottoman statistics, the village had 164 inhabitants in 1895. In 1992, the village had a mixed population of Greeks and Aromanians, numbering 215 inhabitants.
