= Krongj =

Krongj Κρόγγι
- Village
- Location within Albania
- Coordinates: 39°54′47″N 20°10′24″E
- Country: Albania
- County: Vlorë
- Municipality: Finiq
- Elevation: 240 m (790 ft)
- Time zone: UTC+1 (CET)
  - Summer (DST): UTC+2 (CEST)

Krongj (Albanian: Krongji, Greek: Κρόγγι; romanized: Króggi) is a small village in Vlorë County, southern Albania. At the 2015 local government reform it became part of the municipality of Finiq. It is inhabited solely by Greeks.

== Demographics ==
According to Ottoman statistics, the village had 180 inhabitants in 1895. The village is inhabited by Greeks and the population was 223 in 1992.
