= List of people from Vlorë =

This article is a list of notable people from Vlorë in southern Albania:

== Business ==
- Sinan Idrizi – businessman and major shareholder of Air Albania, Albania’s flag carrier.
- Mira Murati – CTO and interim CEO of OpenAI

== Law ==
- Fiona Papajorgji, current chairwoman of the Constitutional Court of Albania

== Politics ==
- Ismail Qemali – Albanian Independence Movement
- Ali Asllani – Poet and diplomat
- Mehmed Ferid Pasha – Grand Vizier of the Ottoman Empire
- Skënder Gjinushi – Politician
- Qazim Koculi – Albanian Independence Movement
- Lütfi Pasha – Grand Vizier of the Ottoman Empire
- Arben Malaj – Politician
- Manush Myftiu – Albanian Communist Politician
- Harilla Papajorgji – Politician
- Kemankeş Mustafa Pasha – Grand Vizier of the Ottoman Empire
- Eqrem Vlora – Albanian Independence Movement
- Syrja Vlora – Albanian Independence Movement signatory and major Albanian landowner

== Religious leaders ==
- Ahmet Myftar – 6th Dedebaba of the Bektashi Order (born in Brataj, Vlorë County)
- Baba Mondi – Bektashi World Leader and Albanian Bektashi Cleric

== Cinema ==
- Kristaq Mitro – Film director
- Ibrahim Muçaj – Film director
- Drita Pelingu – film and stage actress
- Orli Shuka - British-Albanian actor born in Vlorë.
- Agim Shuka - (April 1942–May 20, 1992) Was a famous Albanian film and stage actor. Lived in Vlore for 16 years and was educated and became a teacher there, also where his two kids were born.
- Dhimiter Anagnosti - Film director
- Albert Verria - Actor, Comedian
- Leonard Bombaj - Film director
- Nik Xhelilaj - Actor

== Musicians ==
- Alban Skenderaj – Singer
- Aurela Gaçe – Singer
- Kristaq Paspali – Operatic tenor
- Elsa Lila – Singer
- Josif Gjipali – Tenor
- Shpetim Kushta – Composer
- Anita Bitri – Singer
- Nina Muho – Operatic singer
- Oleg Arapi – Dirigent
- Ermonela Jaho – Soprano*Adrian Hila-Composer

== Sports ==
- Sokol Kushta – Former football player of Partizani, Flamurtari and of Albania's national team
- Viktor Mitrou – Weightlifter
- Perlat Musta – Former football goalkeeper of Partizani's team, and of Albania's national team
- Geri Cipi – Former football player of Albania's national team
- Igli Tare – Former football player of Albania's national team
- Suela Mëhilli – Alpinist
- Bejkush Birce – Trainer
- Vasil Ruci – Football player
- Alban Bushi – Football player
- Ervin Skela – Football player

== Literature ==
- Sadedin Mezuraj - sociologist and writer

== Art ==
- Michele Greco da Valona - Christian Renaissance icon painter
