= Kristaq =

Kristaq (pronounced [kɾisˈtac]) is an Albanian masculine given name derived from Greek Χριστάκης (Christákis), a diminutive of "Christ". Notable people with the name include:

- Kristaq Antoniu (1907–1979) aka Cristache Antoniu, Albanian-Romanian operetta singer and actor
- Kristaq Dhamo (1933–2022), Albanian actor and film director
- Kristaq Eksarko (1959–2025), Albanian footballer
- Kristaq Mile (born 1958), Albanian footballer and coach
- Kristaq Mitro (1945–2023), Albanian film director
- Kristaq Paspali (1926–2001), Albanian operatic tenor
- Kristaq Rama (1932–1998), Albanian sculptor, art educator and governmental fine-arts administrator

== See also ==
- Cristache, the Romanian form
