= List of mayors of Vlorë =

This is a list of mayors of Vlorë who have served since the Albanian Declaration of Independence of 1912.

== Mayors (1912–present) ==
No.	Name	Term in office	
1	Abas Mezini	1912	1913
2	Ibrahim Abdullahu	1913	1914
3	Osmen Haxhiu	1915	1915
4	Ali Asllani	1918	1920
5	Abas Mezini	1920	1922
6	Qazim Kokoshi	1922	1924
7	Nuredin Vlora	1925	1927
8	Zyhdi Karagjozi	1927	1928
9	Arshi Xhindi	1928	1932
10	Abedin Nepravishta	1932	1933
11	Tef Naraçi	1933	1934
12	Ali Asllani	1934	1939
13	Kristaq Strati	1939	1942
14	Nexhip Koka	1942	1943
15	Enver Taraku	1943	1943
16	Muhedin Haxhiu	1943	1944
Executive Committee (1944–1992)
17	Elham Sharra	1992	1996
18	Gëzim Zilja	1996	1997
19	Agron Shehu, Tare Hamo	1997	1998
20	David Tushe, Neki Dredha	1998	2000
21	Niko Veizaj	2000	2003
22	Shpëtim Gjika	2003	2015
23	Dritan Leli	2015	2023
24	Ermal Dredha	2023	2025
25	Brunilda Mersini	2025	Incumbent

== See also ==
- Politics of Albania
