= Mitro (name) =

Mitro is both a masculine given name and a surname. People with the name include:

== Surname ==
- György Mitró (1930–2010), Hungarian swimmer
- Kristaq Mitro (born 1948), Albanian film director and academic

== Given name ==
- Mitro Makarchuk, known as Mac Makarchuk (1929–2021), Canadian politician and journalist
- Mitro Repo (born 1958), Finnish priest

== Fictional characters ==
- Mitro, one of the main characters in the 2009 Indian movie Jag Jeondeyan De Mele
