= Shushicë =

Shushicë may refer to the following places in Albania:

- two villages:
  - Shushicë, Elbasan, in the Elbasan municipality
  - Shushicë, Vlorë, in the Vlorë municipality
- Shushicë (river), in the Vlorë District

== See also ==
- Sušice
