= Mustafa Nano =

Albanian journalist, writer and diplomat (born 1960)

Ambassador of Albania to Switzerland and Liechtenstein
- In office 29 September 2023 – 24 December 2024
- President: Bajram Begaj
- Prime Minister: Edi Rama
- Succeeded by: Ermal Dredha

Personal details
- Born: January 4, 1960 (age 66) Shijak, PR Albania
- Education: University of Tirana
- Occupation: Journalist, writer, diplomat
- Profession: Electronics engineer (former)

Mustafa Nano (born January 4, 1960) is an Albanian journalist, writer and diplomat who previously served as Albania's ambassador to Switzerland and Liechtenstein (2023–2024). He is a former member of the Albanian Democratic Party. He later switched careers from politics to journalism, beginning work at the newspaper Shekulli in 1997. In his writings he espouses a liberal-progressive worldview. Other newspapers that he has worked with are Korrieri and Shqip. He is also the author of three essay books.

In May 2023, Nano was nominated by the Albanian government to become the ambassador to Switzerland. The nomination was confirmed in June.
