= Ibrahim Muçaj =

Albanian film director

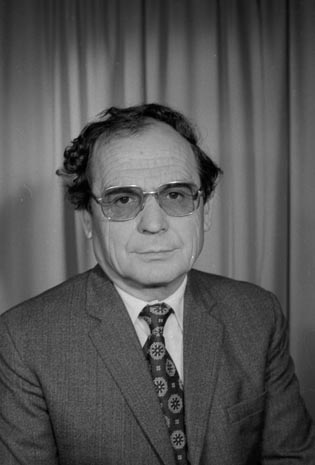
- Born: December 8, 1944; Vlorë, Albania
- Died: January 5, 2010
- Children: Irvin Muçaj

Ibrahim Muçaj ( December 8th 1944 – January 5th 2010) was an Albanian film director.

== Biography ==
Ibrahim Muçaj was born in Vlorë. In 1968, he graduated from the Academy of Arts in Tirana. After graduation, he worked as an assistant director. He first appeared on set as an assistant to Viktor Gjika. He has also collaborated with Hysen Hakani, Piro Milkani and Kristaq Dhamo. In 1971, he began making his own documentary film. His debut was the film New Song. The first feature film in his oeuvre was the 1975 film Dimri and Fundit, for which he received an award at the 2nd Albanian Film Festival. He has made 8 documentaries and 10 feature films. The feature films were created in a directional duo with Kristaq Mitro. He directed Apasionata in 1983 with Kristaq Mitro.

For his artistic activity, he was awarded the title of Merited Artist in 1987. From 1995 to 1997, he headed the ALBAFILM film studio.

He died of heart attack in his apartment on January 5th, 2010. He is survived by his son, Irvin Muçaj.
