= Soda Forest =

Coastal forest park in Albania

- Pylli i Sodës; Pylli i Kumeve
- Interactive map of Soda Forest
- Location: Zvërnec, Vlorë, Albania
- Coordinates: 40°29′26″N 19°26′30″E
- Area: 500–550 ha
- Operator: Formerly state forestry authorities; currently overseen by the local church
- Status: Active, partly degraded

Soda Forest (Albanian: Pylli i Sodës), also known as Kume Forest (Albanian: Pylli i Kumeve), is a coastal forest park near the village of Zvërnec in the Vlorë region of southwestern Albania. It covers an area of approximately 500 to 550 hectares, extending about 5 kilometres in length and between 1 and 1.5 kilometres in width. The forest stretches from the old beach area to the last neighborhood of Zvërnec.

== History ==
The area where the forest is located today was once a marshy terrain with sand dunes and waterlogged zones, which created unhealthy conditions for local residents. In 1947–1948, an afforestation initiative was launched under the direction of local authorities and forestry specialists of the time. The planting campaign was carried out in December, which had been declared the "Month of Forests," and involved the participation of local inhabitants and schoolchildren.

In 1968, the Albanian government issued a decision to afforest the entire coastal belt of the country. As part of this project, a specific plan was drawn up for the Soda area, extending as far as the mouth of the Vjosë River, with the aim of creating a forest that would serve both sanitary and aesthetic functions.

In subsequent years, the forest was maintained through activities such as weeding, fertilization with nitrate, and pruning of dry branches to prevent fires. During this period, cutting trees and collecting firewood were prohibited, and violators faced heavy fines. The forest was administered under strict state protocols of the time.

== After 1990 ==
After 1990–1991, following the dissolution of state forestry institutions and centralized oversight, the forest began to degrade. According to forestry engineer Mustafa Dedenika, one of the key technical directors of the Soda afforestation project, more than 30,000 m³ of materials were dumped in the area, altering its topography and ecological balance. He assessed that the two-decade-long transition period had a negative impact on the preservation of this natural resource.

Today, the forest is maintained and supervised by the church located near Zvërnec.

== See also ==
- Zvërnec
- Narta Lagoon
