= Flag's Square =

Main plaza in Vlorë, Albania

Coordinates: 40.4707°N 19.4913°E

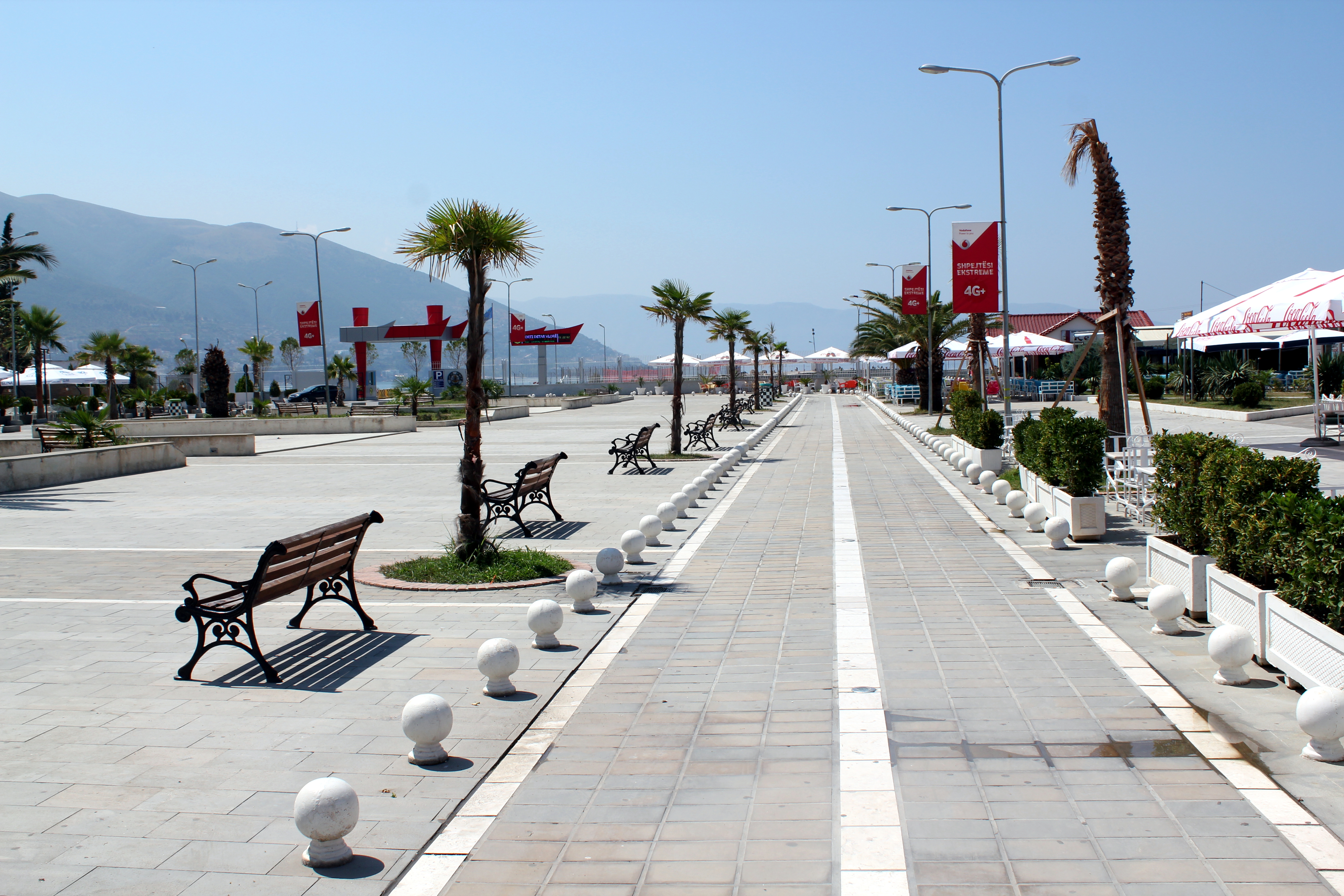

The Flag's Square (Albanian: Sheshi i Flamurit) is the main plaza in Vlorë, Albania, dedicated to the Albanian Declaration of Independence. In its center is the Independence Monument, a sculpture by Albanian artist Mumtaz Dhrami.
