= Muradie Mosque =

Mosque in Vlorë, Albania

- Xhamia e Muradies
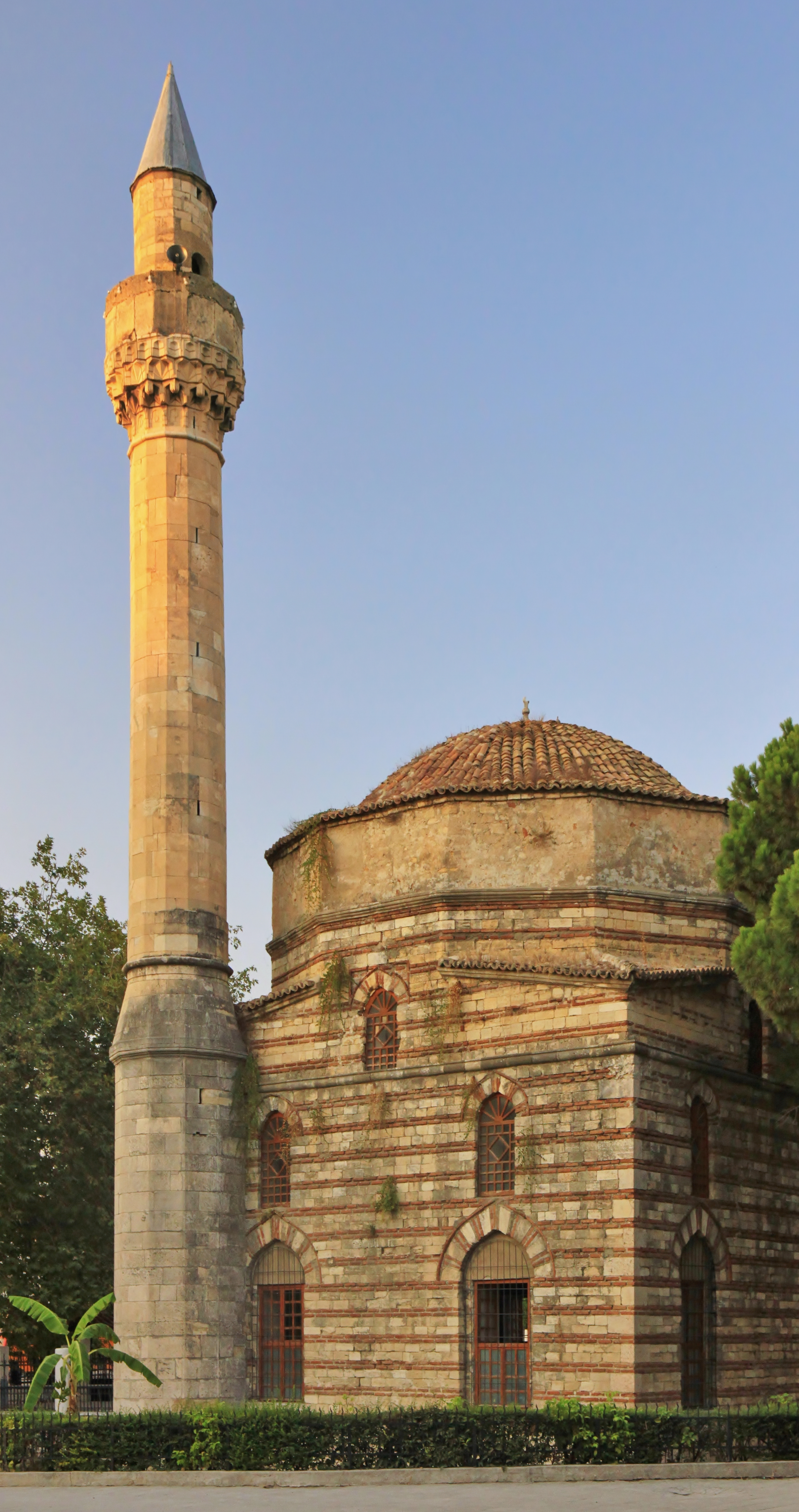
- The mosque in 2011

- Location of the mosque in Albania

Religion
- Affiliation: Islam
- Ecclesiastical or organizational status: Mosque
- Status: Active

Location
- Location: Vlorë, Vlorë County
- Country: Albania
- Interactive map of Muradie Mosque
- Coordinates: 40°28′09″N 19°29′27″E

Architecture
- Architect: Mimar Sinan
- Type: Islamic architecture
- Style: Ottoman
- Completed: 1542 CE; 1557 CE (minaret)

Specifications
- Dome: 1
- Minaret: 1
- Minaret height: 18 m (59 ft)

Cultural Monument of Albania
- Official name: Muradie Mosque
- Reference no.: X1364

The Muradie Mosque (Albanian: Xhamia e Muradies), also known as the Lead Mosque (Xhamia e Plumbit), is a mosque located in Vlorë, Albania. Situated in downtown Vlora on a central square, the mosque is surrounded by roads on all four sides, west of Sadik Zotaj, south of Lef Sallata and east of Papa Kristo Negovani streets.

The mosque was built between 1537 and 1542 CE, designed by Turkish architect Mimar Sinan in the Ottoman style, during the Ottoman Empire rule of Sultan Suleiman the Magnificent. The mosque was designated as a Cultural Monument of Albania.

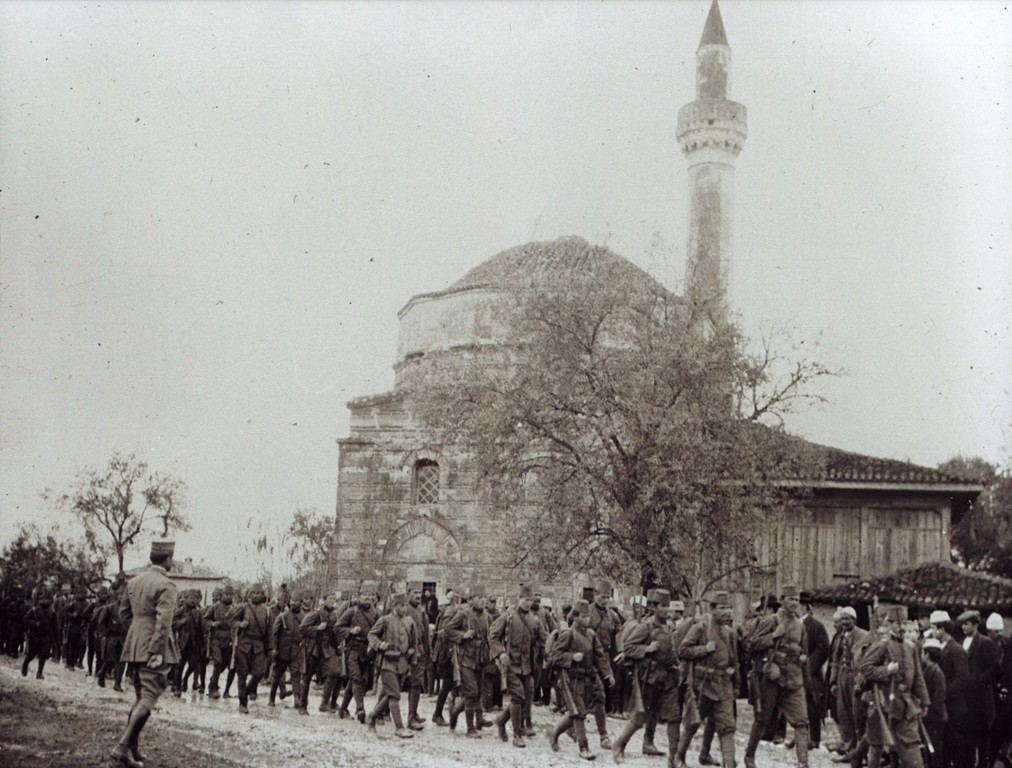
The historic mosque in 1913 with its portico

== Architecture ==
The structure consists of the main building and the minaret. The prayer hall is approximately 10 to 11 square metres (110 to 120 sq ft), while the minaret is 18 metres (59 ft) tall. The structure initially contained a portico (hajati) that was destroyed at a later date. The mosque has a dome with a supporting polygon raised base, arched windows and classical triangular forms topping the side walls. The brick work of the Muradie Mosque has layers with two different brick colours. There is also a contrast between the texture, quality, colour, as well as size and sequence of the bricks used to build the Islamic prayer hall compared with the larger white chiseled stones used to build the minaret.

It is believed that the cultural monument was designed by Mimar Sinan, a leading mosque builder in the Ottoman Empire and the author of the Great Suleymaniye Mosque in Constantinople (Istanbul).

== Gallery ==
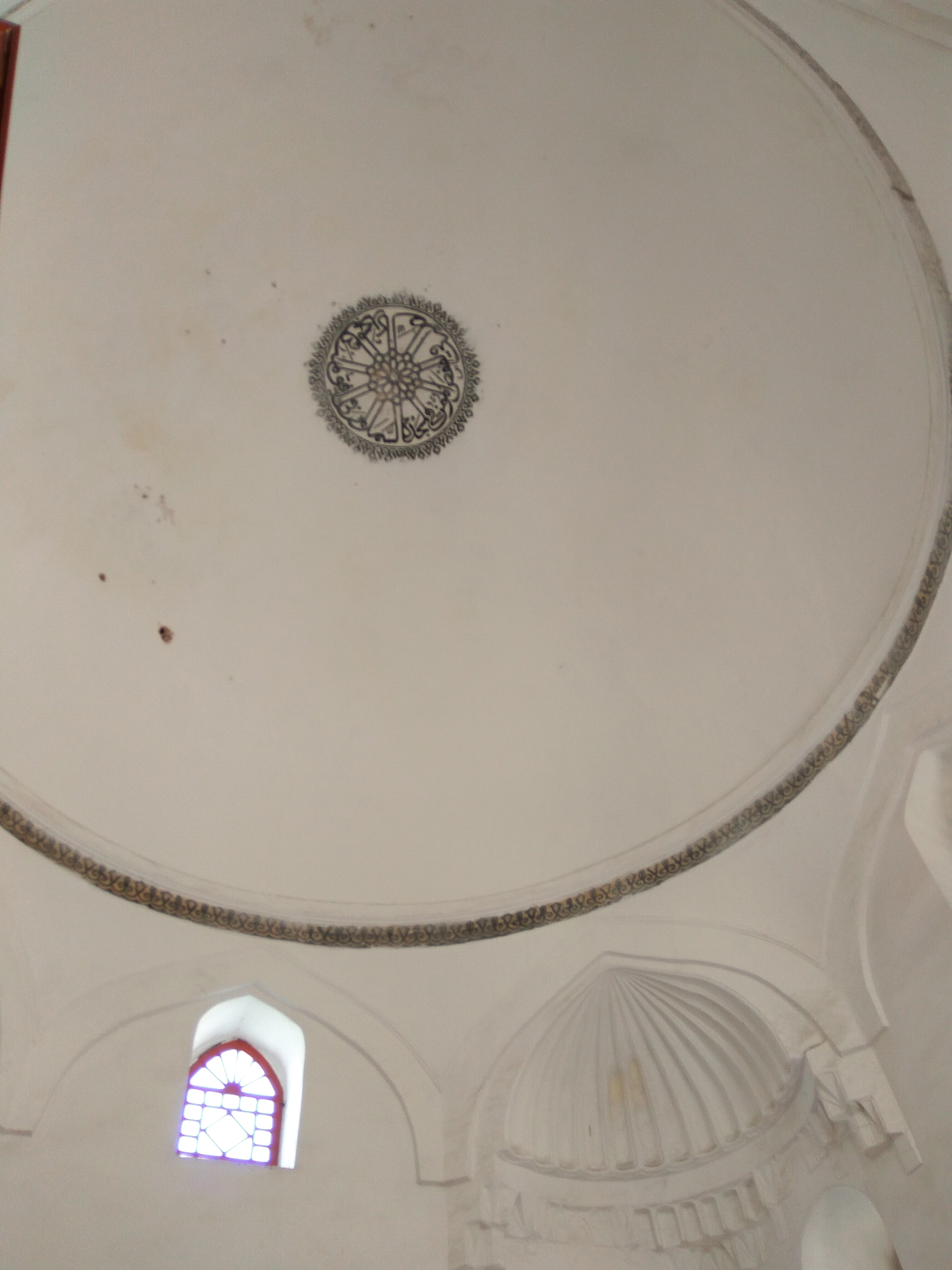
Interior view of dome

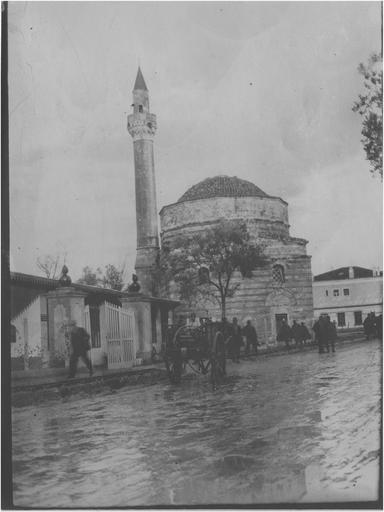
The historic mosque in 1913 photpgraphed by the French

== See also ==
- Islam in Albania
- List of mosques in Albania
- List of Religious Cultural Monuments of Albania
