= Independence Monument (Albania) =

Coordinates: 40°28′14″N 19°29′25″E

Independence Monument Monumenti i Pavarësisë
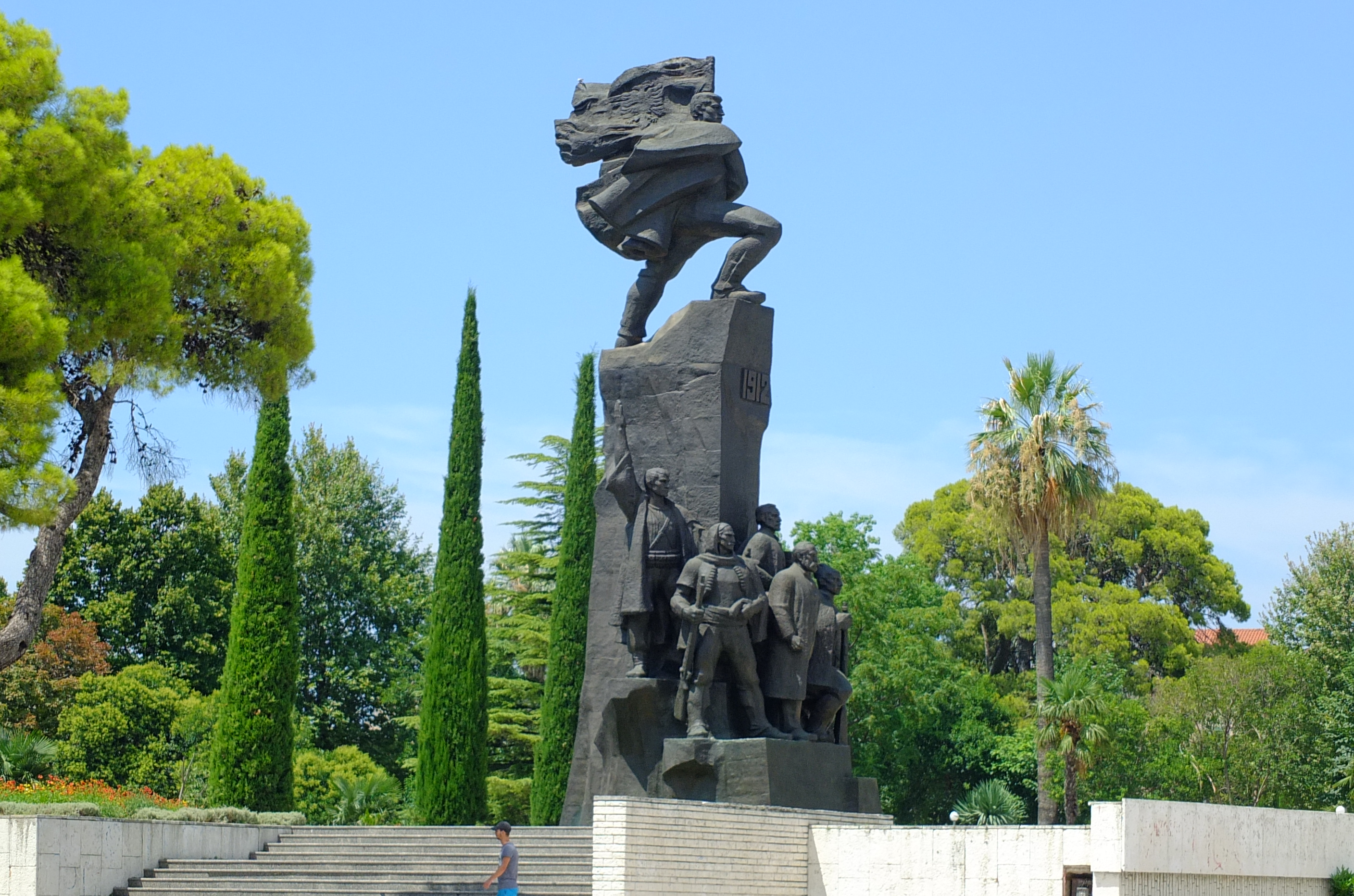
- Interactive map of Independence Monument; Monumenti i Pavarësisë
- Location: Sheshi i Flamurit; Vlorë, Albania

Site notes
- Height: 17 m (56 ft)
- Sculptor: Muntaz Dhrami, Kristaq Rama

The Monument of Independence is a monument in Vlorë, Albania, dedicated to the Albanian Declaration of Independence and worked by Albanian sculptors, Muntaz Dhrami and Kristaq Rama. It is found in the Flag's Plaza, near the building where the first Albanian government worked in 1913.

In the center of the monument is the sculpture of Ismail Kemal, the leader of the Albanian national movement and founder of Independent Albania.
