= Ermal Dredha =

Albanian politician and diplomat (born 1977)

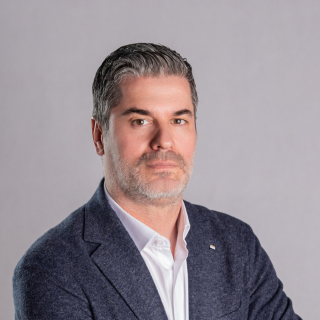

Ambassador of Albania to Switzerland and Liechtenstein
- Incumbent
- Assumed office 10 November 2025
- Appointed by: Bajram Begaj
- Preceded by: Mustafa Nano

Mayor of Vlorë
- In office July 2023 – 10 September 2025
- Preceded by: Dritan Leli
- Succeeded by: Brunilda Mersini

Personal details
- Born: 15 October 1977 (age 48) Vlorë, PSR Albania
- Party: Socialist Party of Albania
- Education: University of Tirana
- Profession: Diplomat, politician

Ermal Dredha (born 15 October 1977) is an Albanian diplomat and politician, currently serving as the Ambassador of Albania to Switzerland, also accredited as non-resident Ambassador to the Principality of Liechtenstein. He was appointed to this position by President Bajram Begaj on 10 November 2025.

He previously served as Mayor of Vlorë from July 2023 to September 2025, and has also held various positions within Albania’s Ministry for Europe and Foreign Affairs, including as Ambassador to the United Arab Emirates and Director of State Protocol of Albania.

== Early life and education ==
Born in Vlora, Albania, Dredha graduated with a bachelor's degree in Italian and English from the Faculty of Foreign Languages at the University of Tirana (1996–2000). He also obtained a certification in Information Technology from an institute in Tirana in 2000. In 2003, he attended a professional course in English in Toronto, Canada, and in 2004–2005 earned a diploma from the Ministry of Foreign Affairs of Japan in Osaka, focusing on Japanese language, history, and culture. From 2006 to 2007, he completed a specialized course in Event Management at the European School of Economics in London.

== Career ==
Dredha began his career in 1999 as a translator for Italian journalists during the Kosovo crisis. In 2000, he became an assistant and general manager of the digital archive at Italian Cooperation in Tirana, overseeing water supply infrastructure projects in Albania.

In 2002, he joined the Ministry for Europe and Foreign Affairs as a personal assistant to the Deputy Prime Minister and Minister of Foreign Affairs. He later served as head of the IT sector and State Protocol Department. From 2010 to 2013, he was Director of State Protocol.

Between November 2013 and November 2016, Dredha was Consul General of Albania in Bari, Italy. From May 2016 to March 2023, he served as Albania's Ambassador to the United Arab Emirates.

In April 2023, Dredha was selected by the Socialist Party of Albania as their candidate for the Vlora mayoral election. He won the election in May 2023, securing over 70% of the vote. He officially assumed office in July 2023, succeeding Dritan Leli.
