= Siege of Vlorë =

Siege of Vlorë (1691)
- Part of the Morean War
Date	4 February – 6 March 1691
Location	Vlorë, Republic of Venice
Result	Ottoman victory

Belligerents
Ottoman Empire	Republic of Venice

Commanders and leaders
Koca Halil Pasha; Küçük Cafer Pasha; Süleyman Pasha	Giralomo Cornaro †; Giovanni Matteo †; Charles Sparre †

Strength
6,000 Janissaries and an unknown number of siege guns	Unknown

Casualties and losses
Light	4,000

The siege of Vlorë was a siege in 1691 in which the Ottoman army under the command of Koca Halil Pasha inflicted a great defeat on the Venetians and took back this important castle and port as a result of the siege carried out between February 4 and March 6, 1691.

== Background ==
In the summer of 1690, the Ottoman garrison in Vlorë was considerably weakened, as the Governor of Rumelia and Vlorë, Küçük Cafer Pasha, joined the expedition of Köprülüzade Fazıl Mustafa Pasha against Austria with all his troops.

After the Albanians in the Sanjak informed the Venice about this situation, the Venetian fleet, consisting of 55 units, under the command of Giralomo Cornaro invaded and captured the castles of Vlorë and Kaninë on September 19, 1690. The Grand Vizier Köprülüzade Fazıl Mustafa Pasha received this news while besieging Belgrade and tasked Koca Halil Pasha with recapturing the castle.

Doche of Venice Francesco Morosini was hesitant about holding the castles of Vlorë and Kaninë, because the period when the Ottoman Empire lost territory between 1684 and 1689 was over, and Grand Vizier Köprülüzade Fazıl Mustafa Pasha had re-strengthened the Ottomans' position in the Balkans by liberating Niš, Vidin, Smederevo and Belgrade from the occupation of the Austria in his campaign of 1690. Therefore, Doçe Morosini was also concerned that the resources spent on castles in Albania could weaken the defenses of Morea in case of an Ottoman counterattack.

== Siege ==
A Serdar was appointed to retake Vlorë and was given 6,000 janissaries and siege guns Vizier Koca Halil Pasha, Rumelia Governor Küçük Cafer Pasha, Sanjak of İşkodra and his Guard Süleyman Pasha and Sanjak of Prizren Mahmud Bey also joined the troops under his command.

On March 4, the 28th day of the siege that began on February 4, 1691, the Venetian navy landed in the region and brought in reinforcements. The attack of these troops on the Shkodër soldiers under the command of Süleyman Pasha, who were in the metris, was repelled as a result of the Ottomans quickly taking up defensive positions. In addition to the prisoners, the Venetian force, which suffered approximately 4,000 casualties, fled to the ships in defeat. During the siege, the garrison commander Giovanni Matteo Bembo and (Swedish) General Charles Sparre were also killed in the bombardment by Turkish artillery.

As a result, the Venetian garrison in the castle of Vlorë, who had no hope of escape, destroyed the walls sewers and evacuated the castle (March 6, 1691).

== Aftermath ==
After the capture of the castle, it was understood that the damage was extensive and needed to be repaired, so no garrison was left in Vlorë and guards were placed in the nearby Kaninë castle instead.

The target of the Venetian Republic in the following campaign season was Chania in Crete.
