= Cristache =

Cristache (pronounced [krisˈtake]) is a Romanian given name derived from Greek Χριστάκης (Christákis), a diminutive of "Christ". Notable people with the name include:

- Cristache Antoniu (1907–1979) aka Kristaq Antoniu, Albanian-Romanian operetta singer and actor
- Cristache Gheorghiu (born 1937), Romanian writer, painter, mechanical engineer and computer scientist

== See also ==
- Kristaq, the Albanian form
