= Brunilda Mersini =

Albanian obstetrician-gynecologist and politician (born 1969)

Mayor of Vlorë
- Incumbent
- Assumed office 21 November 2025
- Preceded by: Ermal Dredha

Member of the Parliament of Albania
- In office 12 September 2025 – 27 October 2025

Personal details
- Born: 19 September 1969 (age 56) Sofia, Bulgaria
- Party: Socialist Party of Albania
- Education: University of Medicine, Tirana
- Profession: Obstetrician-gynecologist, academic, politician

Brunilda "Bruna" Mersini (born 19 September 1969) is an Albanian obstetrician-gynecologist and politician serving as the mayor of Vlorë since November 2025.

Mersini has worked in the healthcare sector as an obstetrician-gynecologist and hospital administrator. From 2014 to 2025, she served as director of the Regional Hospital of Vlorë. She has also been involved in academic teaching in the fields of medicine and nursing.

In local politics, Mersini served as a member of the Vlorë Municipal Council and the Vlorë Regional Council.

In 2025, she was elected as a member of the Parliament of Albania representing the Socialist Party of Albania. She later resigned from parliament in order to run in the 2025 Vlorë mayoral election.

== Career ==
=== Healthcare ===
- Obstetrician-gynecologist
- Director of the Regional Hospital of Vlorë (2014–2025)
- Academic lecturer in medicine and nursing

=== Politics ===
- Member of the Vlorë Municipal Council
- Member of the Vlorë Regional Council
- Member of the Parliament of Albania (2025)
- Mayor of Vlorë (2025–present)
