= Shushicë, Vlorë =

Village in Albania

Shushicë
- Administrative unit
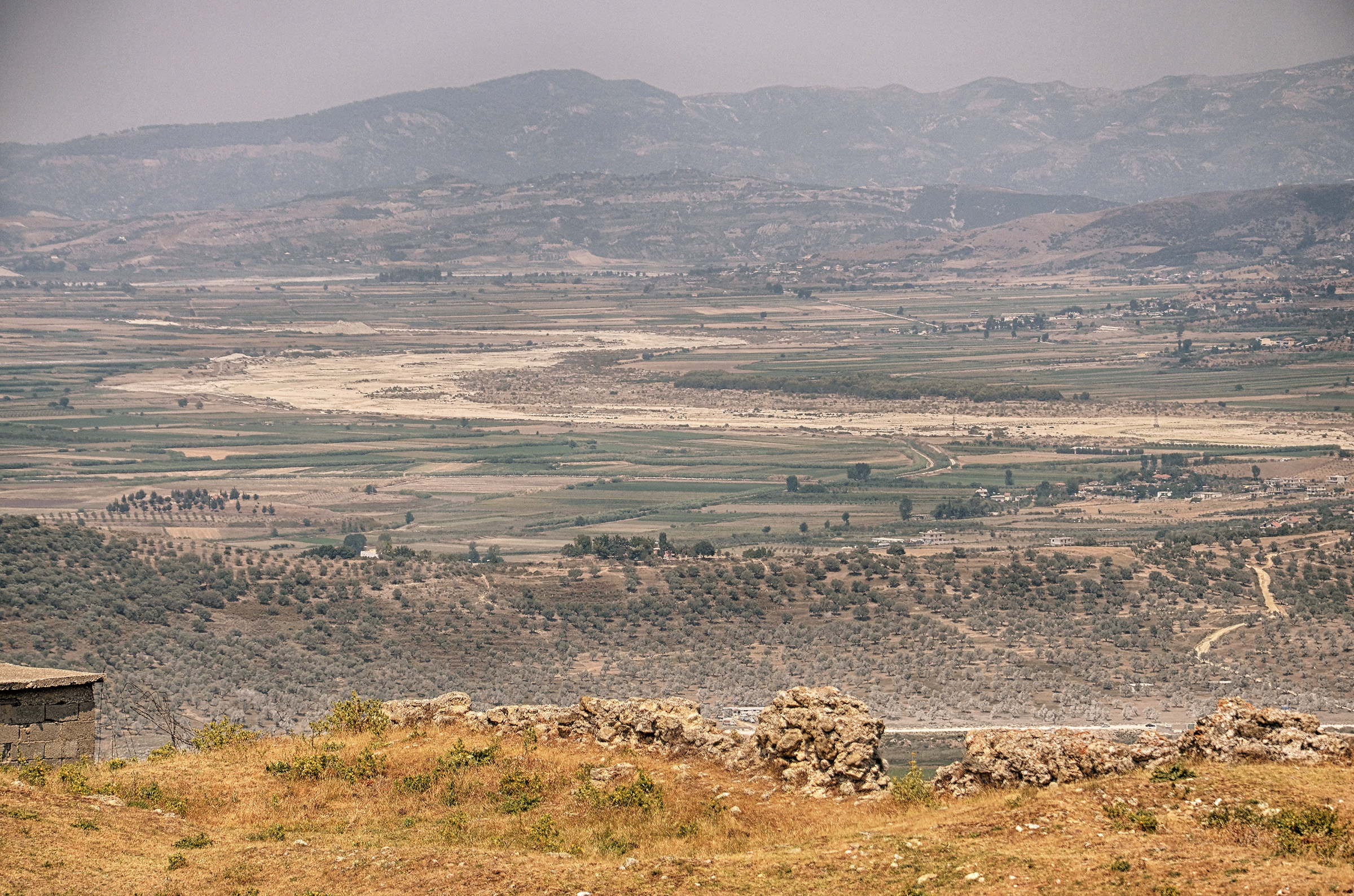
- Shushicë valley

- Location within Albania
- Coordinates: 40°32′N 19°32′E
- Country: Albania
- County: Vlorë
- Municipality: Vlorë

Population (2011)
  - Administrative unit: 3,981
- Time zone: UTC+1 (CET)
  - Summer (DST): UTC+2 (CEST)

Shushicë is a village and a former municipality in the Vlorë County, southwestern Albania. At the 2015 local government reform it became a subdivision of the municipality Vlorë. The population at the 2011 census was 3,981. The municipal unit consists of the villages Shushicë, Bunavi, Beshisht, Grabian, Drithas, Mekat, Llakatund, Çeprat and Risili.
