= Kristaq Paspali =

Albanian operatic tenor

Kristaq Paspali (19 May 1926 – 2001) was an Albanian operatic tenor.

== Early life ==
Paspali was born in 1926 in Vlorë. When he was still very young, he had to leave school because of economic hardship during the Italian occupation of Albania, but he earned his living by selling goods to the Italian soldiers. During 1943 he joined the Albanian army in order to fight for his country's freedom. At the end of 1944 he joined one of the amateur bands of his division. Soon after, he moved to Durrës, where he began working as a driver in the port, but continued to perform with amateur groups. His talent was appreciated by local composer Pjetër Dungu, who invited him to become a soloist in the choir of the local cultural center.

== Career ==
In the years 1950 to 1954 he studied at the Jordan Misja High School in Tirana under the direction of singer Marie Kraja. He had stated that it had been difficult for him to combine school and having to provide for his family, but his hard working wife Kalliroi helped him do it. After that, he began performing in the National Theatre of Opera and Ballet of Albania as their main tenor.

In 1958 he went to study music in Moscow. He was the first Albanian soloist, who starred in the famous Bolshoi Theatre. He sang, among others, in Cavalleria rusticana and Pagliacci. Despite his success in Moscow, his return to Tirana was unspectacular. The relations between Russia and Albania had started to deteriorate, and the fact that, despite him singing Albanian songs in the Bolshoi, he also sang in Italian, was frowned upon by the Albanian government. For two years his salary decreased significantly and he was made to clean the National Theatre of Opera and Ballet of Albania. However, the Albanian people collected a large number of signatures in order to get him back on stage, in which they succeeded. Throughout his career, he performed 23 roles in operas such as Carmen, La traviata, and Tosca, as well as Prenkë Jakova's operas Mrika and Skënderbeu He retired in 1976; however, in 1991, he emigrated with his family to Athens where he won the competition for the Greek National Opera soloist. He also received the award of "Distinguished Artist" in Athens in 1994.

He died in Athens in 2001.

== Personal life ==
In 1946, Paspali married Kalliroi Kontopanou, of Greek descent. They had 4 children: Freideriki, a violinist in the National Albanian Opera Orchestra, Konstantinos, an engineer, Linditta, a painter, and Artemisia, a choreographer and dancer.
