= Oleg Arapi =

Albanian conductor and musician (born 1958)

- Born: 9 July 1958 (age 68); Borisoglebsk, Soviet Union now Russia
- Education: Institute of Arts in Tirana; Moscow Conservatory
- Occupations: Conductor, musician
- Awards: Gloria Artis Medal for Merit to Culture

Oleg Arapi (born July 9, 1958) is an Albanian conductor and musician.

== Early life and education ==
Arapi was born to a mixed Albanian-Russian family. He graduated with a degree in conducting from the Institute of Arts in Tirana in 1988. He pursued further studies from 2004 to 2006 at the Moscow Conservatory in the opera and symphonic conducting class, under the supervision of Leonid Nikolayev.

== Career ==
Arapi has conducted concerts internationally, with performances in Italy, Poland, Ukraine, Ecuador, China, Argentina, and Russia. Throughout his career, he has collaborated with soloists such as Inva Mula and Josif Gjipali. In 2017, he performed with the Oskar Kolberg Świętokrzyskie Philharmonic orchestra in Poland.

== Awards and honors ==
He was awarded the Gloria Artis Medal for Merit to Culture from the Ministry of Culture and National Heritage of the Republic of Poland.
