= Vlorë =

Third largest city of Albania

- Municipality and city
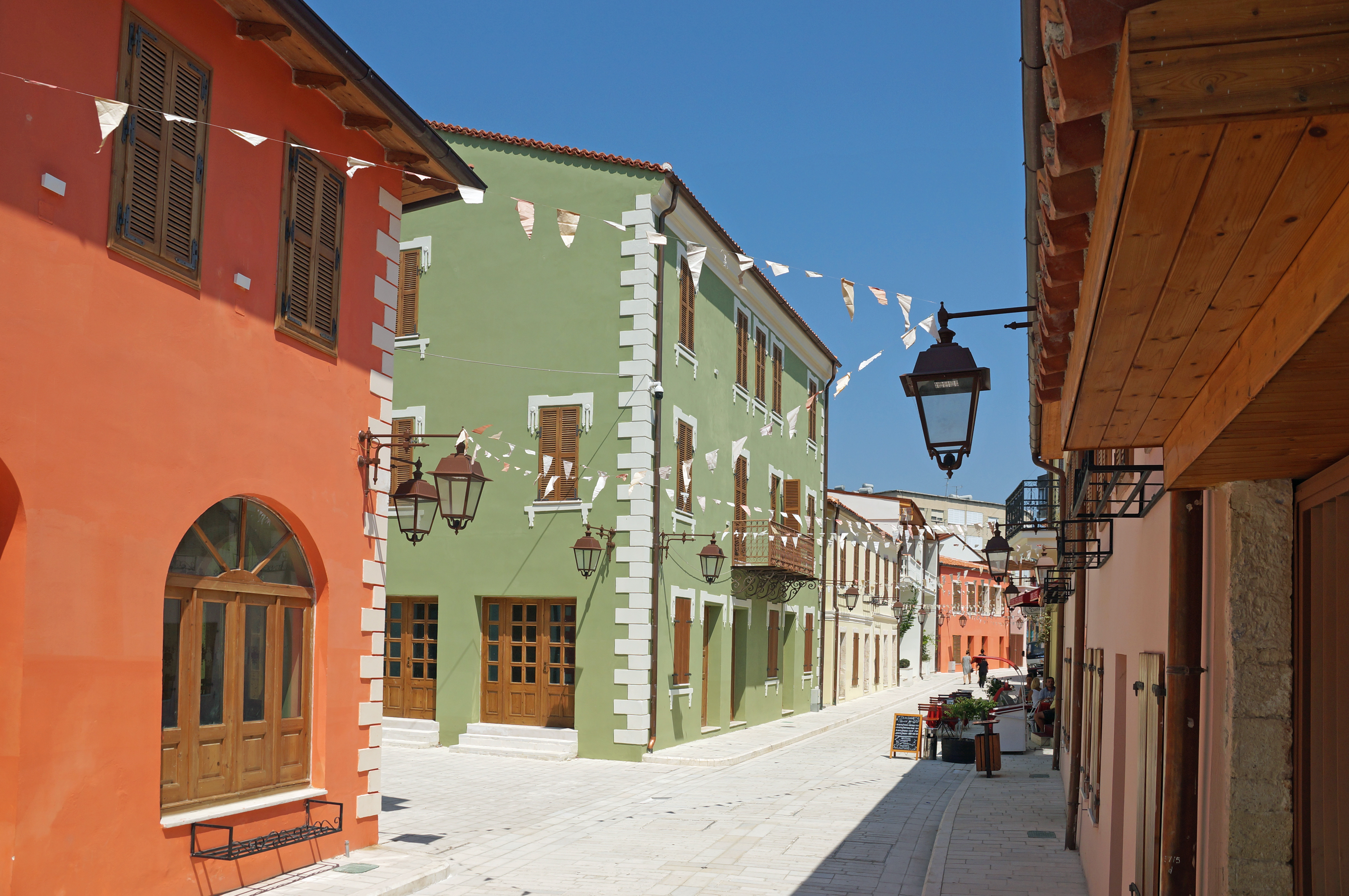
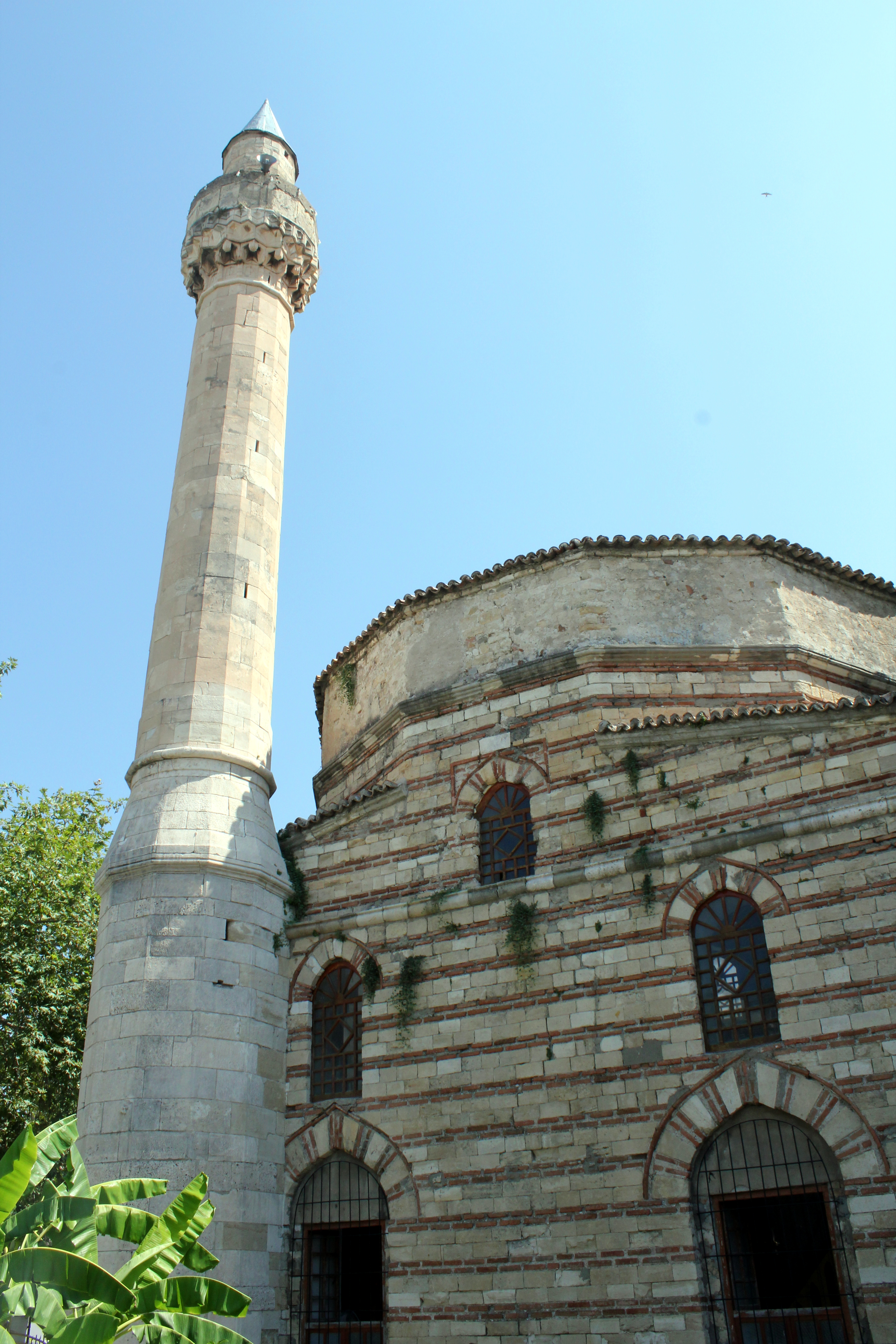
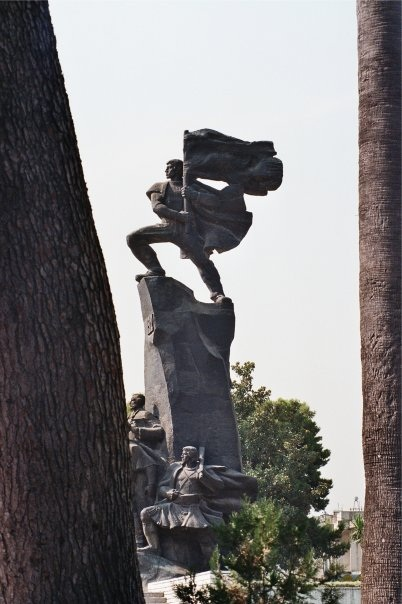
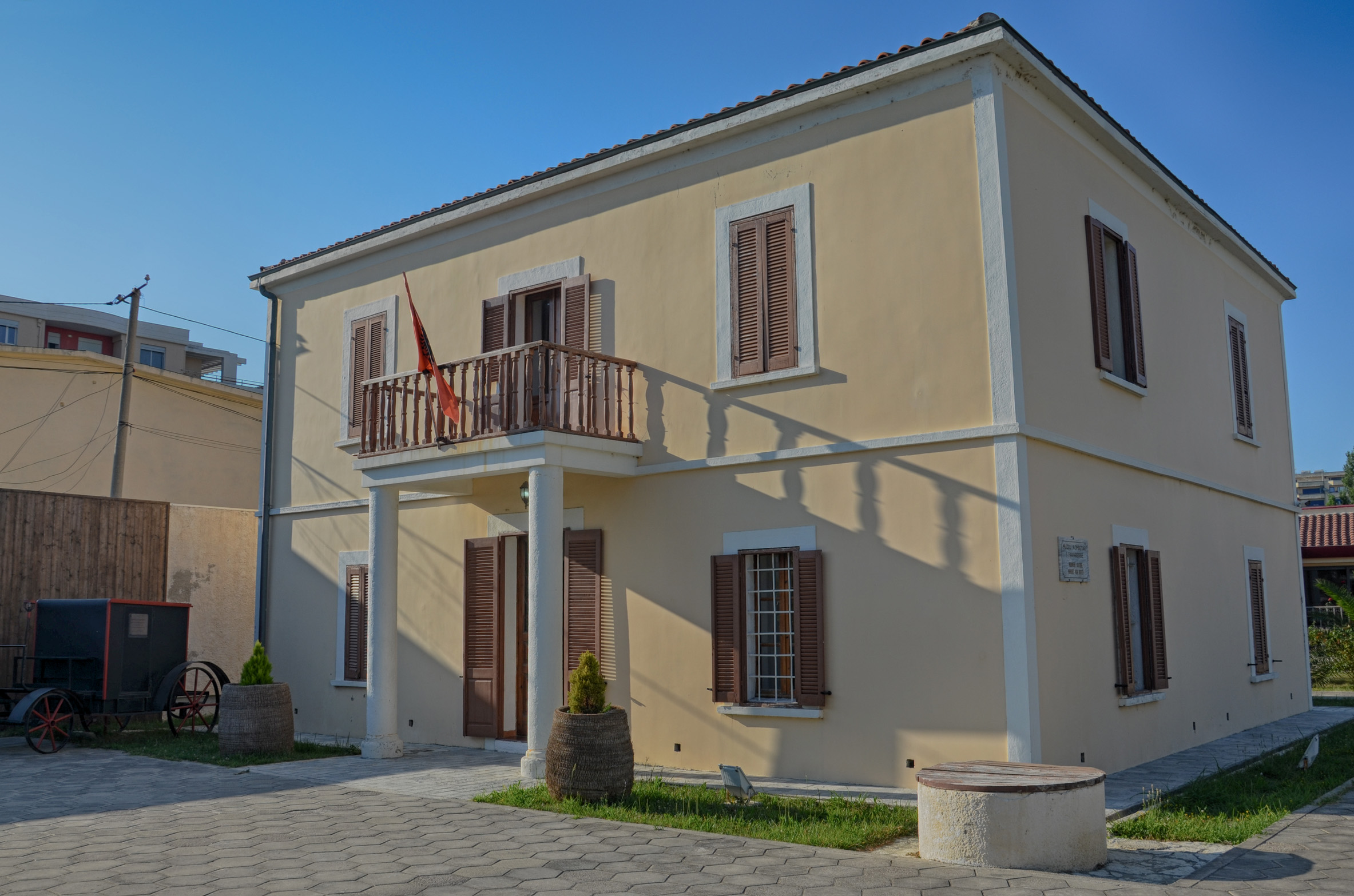
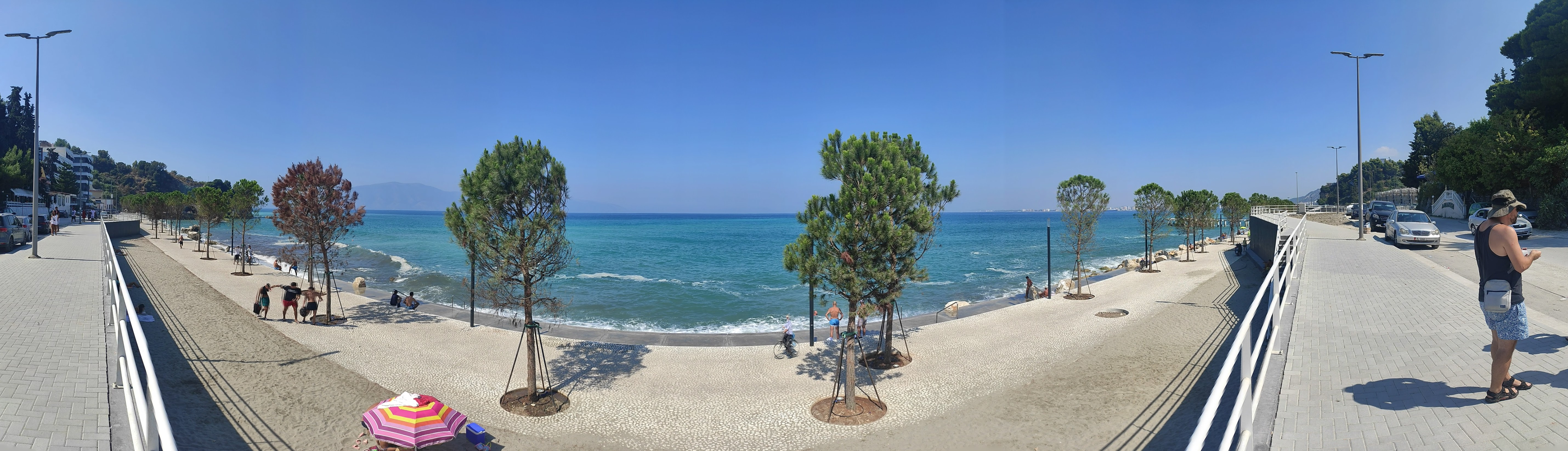
- View of Vlorë Old town Muradie Mosque Independence Monument National Museum of Independence Lungomare area

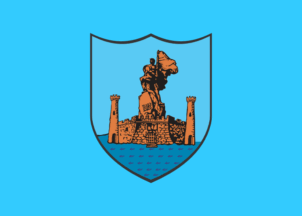
- Flag Seal

- Location within Albania Location within Balkans Location within Europe
- Coordinates: 40°28′N 19°29′E
- Country: Albania
- Region: Southern Albania
- County: Vlorë
- Founded: c. 6th century BC (Triport site)

Government
  - Type: Mayor–council
  - Body: Vlorë Municipal Council
  - Mayor: Brunilda Mersini (PS)

Area
  - Municipality: 616.85 km^{2} (238.17 sq mi)
  - Administrative unit: 28.97 km^{2} (11.19 sq mi)
- Elevation: 0 m (0 ft)

Population (2023)
  - Urban: 115,261
  - Metro: 197,946
  - Municipality: 83,683 (Note: The municipality of Vlorë consists of the administrative units of Novoselë, Orikum, Qendër Vlorë, Shushicë and Vlorë. The population of the municipality results from the sum of the listed administrative units in the former as of the 2011 Albanian census.)
  - Municipality density: 135/km^{2} (350/sq mi)
  - Administrative unit: 66,320
  - Administrative unit density: 2,289/km^{2} (5,930/sq mi)
- Demonym(s): Albanian: Vlonjat (m), Vlonjate (f)
- Time zone: UTC+1 (CET)
  - Summer (DST): UTC+2 (CEST)
- Postal code: 9400
- Area code: +355 (0) 33
- Seaport: Port of Vlorë
- Vehicle registration: VL
- Website: vlora.gov.al

Vlorë (/ˈvlɔːrə/ VLOR-ə; Albanian: [ˈvlɔɾə]; Albanian definite form: Vlora) (Note: Also known as Vlonë (pronounced [ˈvlonə]; Albanian definite form: Vlona) in Gheg Albanian; formerly known in English as Avlona or Valona.) is the third most populous city of Albania and seat of Vlorë County and Vlorë Municipality. Located in southwestern Albania, Vlorë sprawls on the Bay of Vlorë and is surrounded by the foothills of the Ceraunian Mountains along the Albanian Adriatic and Ionian Sea Coasts. It experiences a Mediterranean climate, which is affected by the Ceraunian Mountains and the proximity to the Mediterranean Sea.

The coastal area of Vlorë was one of the Illyrian sites that had experienced pre-urban activity beginning from the 11th–10th centuries BC. The area was colonized by Ancient Greeks. A large fortified port-town that was inhabited from the 6th century BC to the 2nd century AD is placed, now partially submerged, in Triport, northwest of present-day Vlorë. Substantial port activity in this site occurred from at least the archaic period to the medieval period. It has been suggested that a transfer of the ancient city from the site of Triport to the site of modern Vlorë occurred. The center of the modern city features archaeological remains dating from late antiquity. Aulon, from which the modern city took its name, appears in historical sources starting from the 2nd century AD. It was conquered at different periods throughout history by Romans, Byzantines, Normans, Venetians and Ottomans.

Between the 18th and 19th centuries, the Albanians gathered both spiritual and intellectual strength for national consciousness, which conclusively led to the Albanian Renaissance. Vlorë played an instrumental role in Albanian Independence as an epicenter for the founders of modern Albania, who signed the Declaration of Independence on 28 November 1912 at the Assembly of Vlorë.

Vlorë is one of the most significant cities of southern Albania and the region of Labëria which is traditionally noted for its culture, traditions and folklore. Vlorë is served by the Port of Vlorë, the SH 8 highway, and the A2 motorway, collectively representing part of the Adriatic–Ionian Corridor and the Pan-European Corridor VIII.

== Name ==
The city took its name from Ancient Greek: Αὐλών, romanized: Aulṓn, meaning "channel, glen" that resembles an aulos instrument. It is a typical toponym in the Greek world. The name of the city was first recorded in the 2nd century AD, by two Ancient Greek authors, Lucian and Ptolemy, the latter calling it "town and sea-port", which confirms that it was founded much earlier. However, Aulon has not been mentioned by earlier Ancient Greek and Roman authors, who on the other hand recorded the nearby town and seaport of Oricum. But in later sources Oricum is less encountered, while the toponym Aulon is more frequently mentioned.

Vlorë developed from the ancient Aulon-a through the evolution of the phonetic system of the Albanian language with the rhotacism Vlonë > Vlorë, which is a pre-Slavic phenomenon in Albanian. The intervocalic /n/ has regularly evolved to /r/ in Tosk Albanian, while the initial /v/ has evolved from unstressed /u/ after the disappearance of the initial unstressed /a/. The evolution /u/ > /v/ should be relatively ancient, preventing the evolution of the following intervocalic /l/ to /lː/. In Geg Albanian the toponym is pronounced Vlonë, indicating that it has been in use among northern Albanians before the appearance of rhotacism in Tosk Albanian. Also the accent pattern of the name observes Albanian accent rules. The name itself of the inhabitants (sing. vlonjat, pl. vlonjatë) has not undergone the rhotacism affecting the toponym (if it had, it would look something like vlorat or vlorjat).

The medieval and modern Greek name is Avlónas (Αυλώνας Aulṓnas [avˈlonas], accusative Αυλώνα Aulṓna [avˈlona]), and is the source of the Latin Aulona, the Italian Valona (also used in other languages) and of the obsolete English Avlona. During the Ottoman era the city of Vlorë was known in Turkish as Avlonya. In Medieval Latin sources and in Old Italian records it is mentioned with the forms Avalona, Avelona, Lavalona, Lavellona; and in Old Serbian sources as Avlona or Vavlona, the latter containing the Slavic preposition v "in". In Aromanian, the city is known as Avlona.

== History ==
Timeline of Vlorë
Historical affiliations

Illyrians (Taulantii),
Ancient Greeks
Roman Empire, 226 BC – 286
Byzantine Empire, 286 – c. 705
South Slavs, c. 705–784
Byzantine Empire, 784–1204
Despotate of Epirus, 1204–1346
Principality of Valona, 1346–1417
Ottoman Empire, 1417–1691
Republic of Venice, 1691–1698
Ottoman Empire, 1698–1912
Independent Albania, 1912–1914
Principality of Albania, 1915–1917
Italian Expedition, 1917–1920
Principality of Albania, 1920–1925
Albanian Republic, 1925–1928
Albanian Kingdom, 1928–1939
Kingdom of Albania, 1939–1943
Albanian Kingdom, 1943–1944
Democratic Government of Albania, 1944–1946
People's Socialist Republic of Albania, 1946–1992
Albania, 1992–present

=== Early history ===
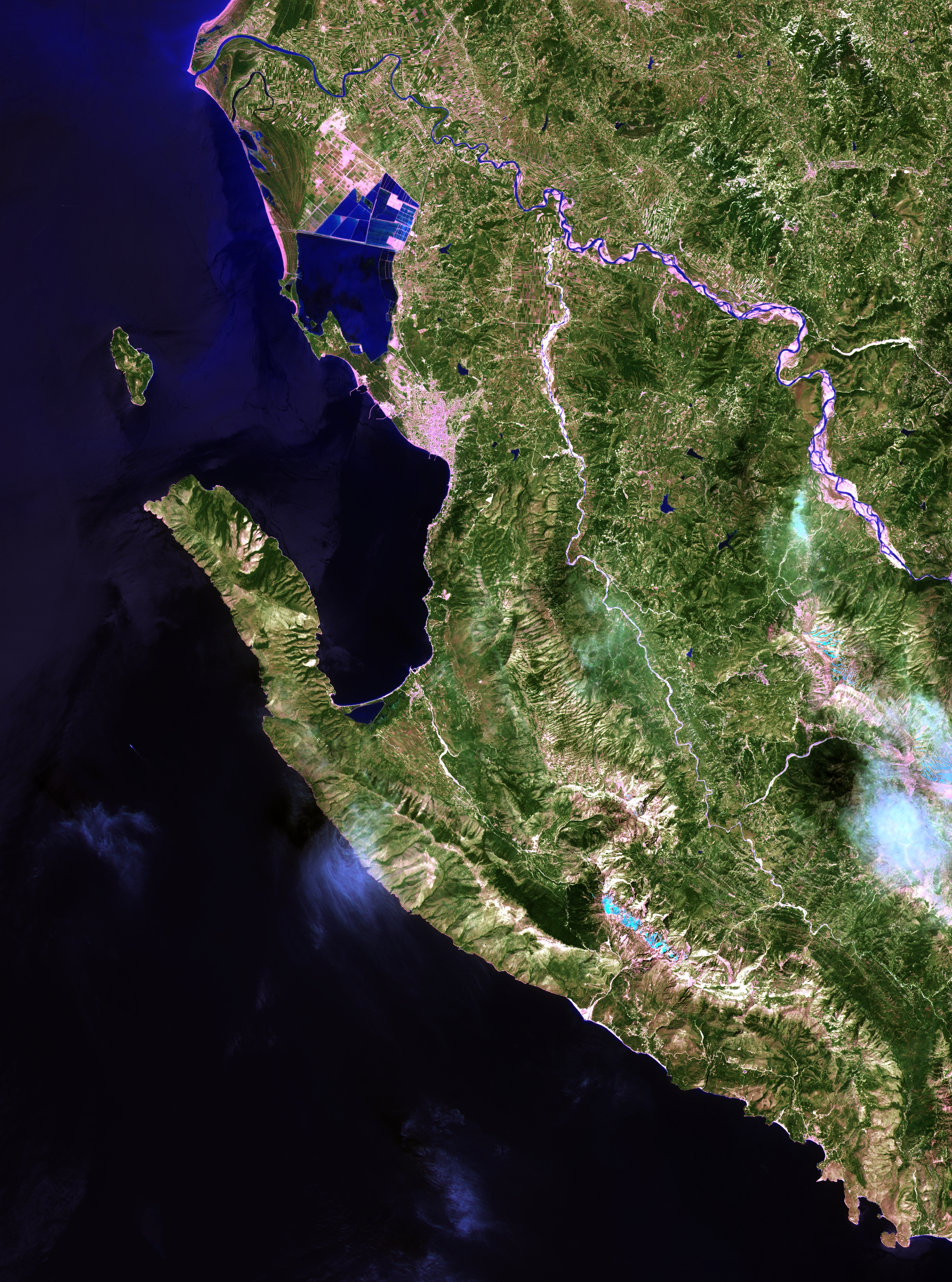

The coastal area of Vlorë was one of those Illyrian sites that had experienced pre-urban activity beginning from the 11th–10th centuries BC. During the period of Euboean colonization of the area (early 8th century BC) the bay of Vlorë was associated with several Heroic traditions and the foundation of several settlements there, as the toponym Aulon suggest which is also known in local Eubean toponimity.

Due to its strategic position on the Adriatic Sea, especially the Bay of Vlorë, which forms a natural harbor, Vlorë occupied a significant place in classical antiquity as a base for trade by many peoples. Vlorë is considered one of the oldest cities in Albania and the region. (Note: "town that is the second seaport of Albania. [...] It was strategically important during Roman times and in the 11th–12th-century wars between Normans and Byzantines" (Encyclopaedia Britannica, s.v. Vlore).) In the Archaic era, the area was colonized by Ancient Greeks, who are traditionally believed to have founded Orikos, Thronion and Aulon on these shores. A large fortified port-town that was inhabited from the 6th century BC to the 2nd century AD is placed, now partially submerged, in Triport, northwest of present-day Vlorë. It was delimited by three walls, the first of which dating back to the late 6th century BC. The port activity in this site lasted from at least the archaic period to the medieval period. It has been suggested that a transfer of the ancient city from the site of Triport to the site of modern Vlorë occurred. The center of the modern city features walls dating from the 4th to the 10th centuries AD, as well as a wall, a quadrangular tower and ruins of a huse with ceramics dating back to the 3rd–4th centuries and to the 6th-7th centuries.

The archaeological site of Triport has been identified with ancient Thronion or Aulon. Thronion was attested by Pausanias (2nd century AD) as a Locrian–Euboean colony, but also by a dedication on a monument erected in Olympia, both accounts reporting that Apollonia conquered the city around 450 BC. Aulon, from which Vlorë took its name, was mentioned for the first time by Ptolemy (2nd century AD) among the towns of the Illyrian Taulantii. Carl Patsch proposed the first location of Aulon in Triport being then transferred to the current location of Vlora, and Pierre Cabanes proposed the location of Thronion in Triport; those identifications are not in contradiction with each other. Other geographical documents, such as the Tabula Peutingeriana and Hierocles' Synecdemus, also mention Aulon. The city served as an important port of the Roman Empire, when it was part of Epirus Nova.

Aulon (Avlona) became an episcopal see in the 5th century. Among the known bishops are Nazarius in 458 and Soter in 553 (Daniele Farlati, Illyricum sacrum, VII, 397–401). The diocese at that time belonged to the papal Pentarchy. In 733, it was annexed with the eastern Illyricum, to the Patriarchate of Constantinople, and yet it is not mentioned in any Notitiae Episcopatuum of that Church. The bishopric had probably been suppressed for though the Bulgarians had been in possession of this country for some time, Avlona is not mentioned in the "Notitiae episcopatuum" of the Bulgarian Archbishopric of Ohrid.

During the Roman period, a Latin see was established and Eubel (Hierarchia catholica medii aevi, I, 124) mentions several of its bishops.

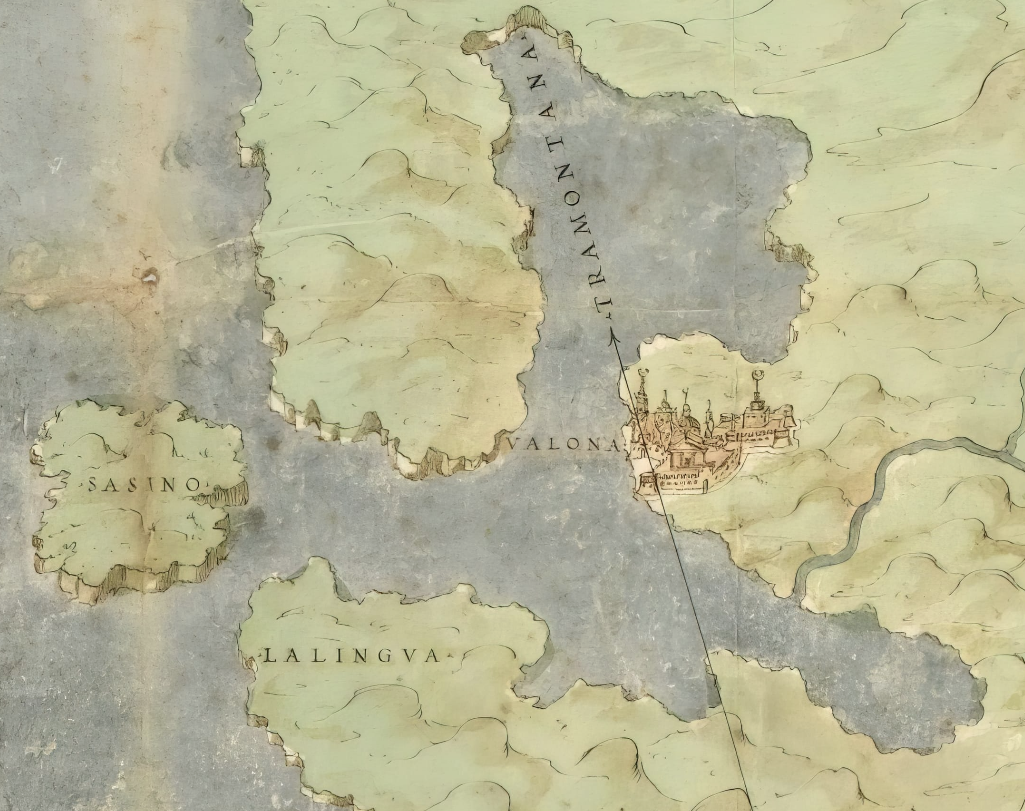
Map of Vlorë and Sazan Island in 1568

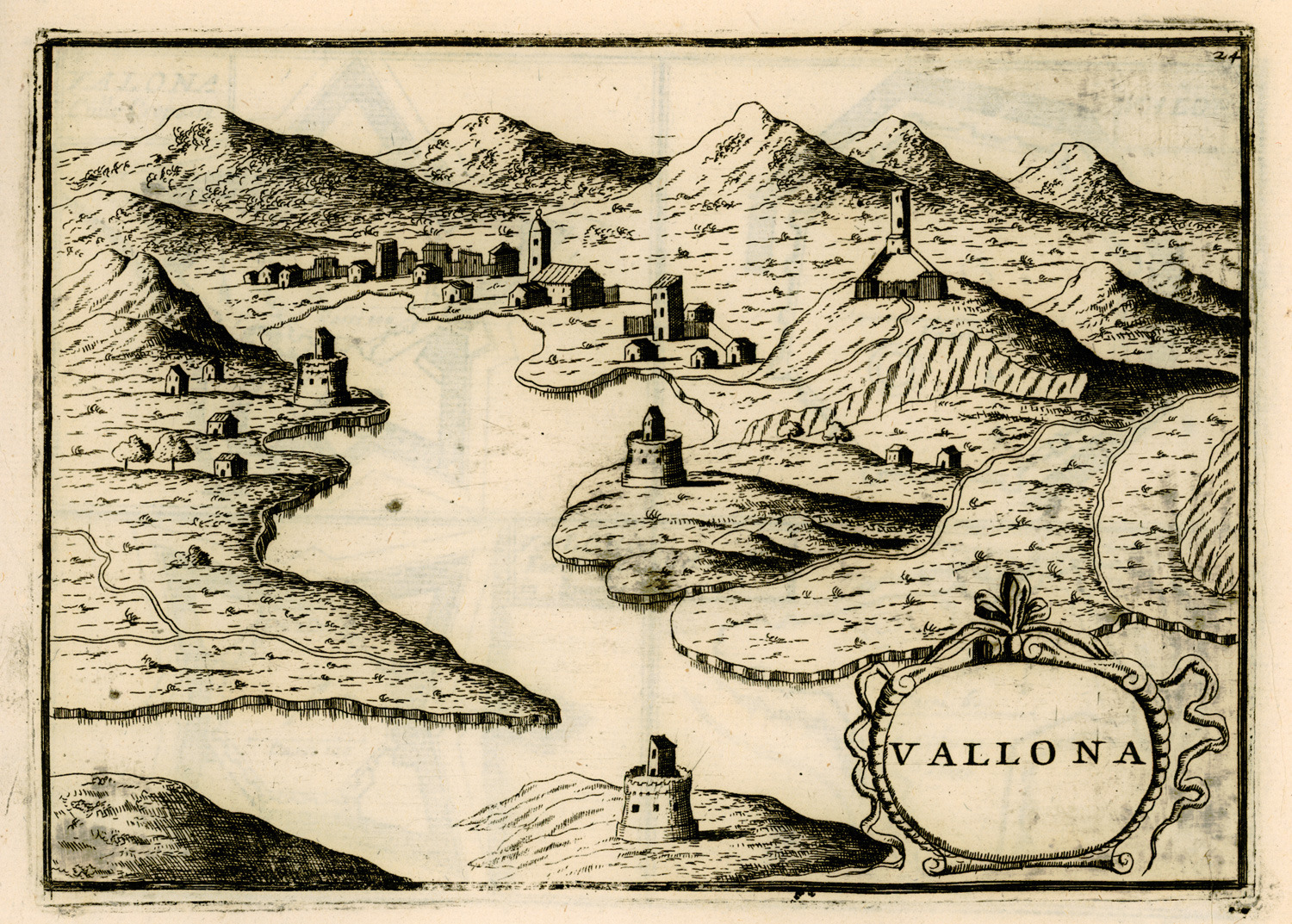
The Port of Vlorë in 1688 by Vincenzo Coronelli

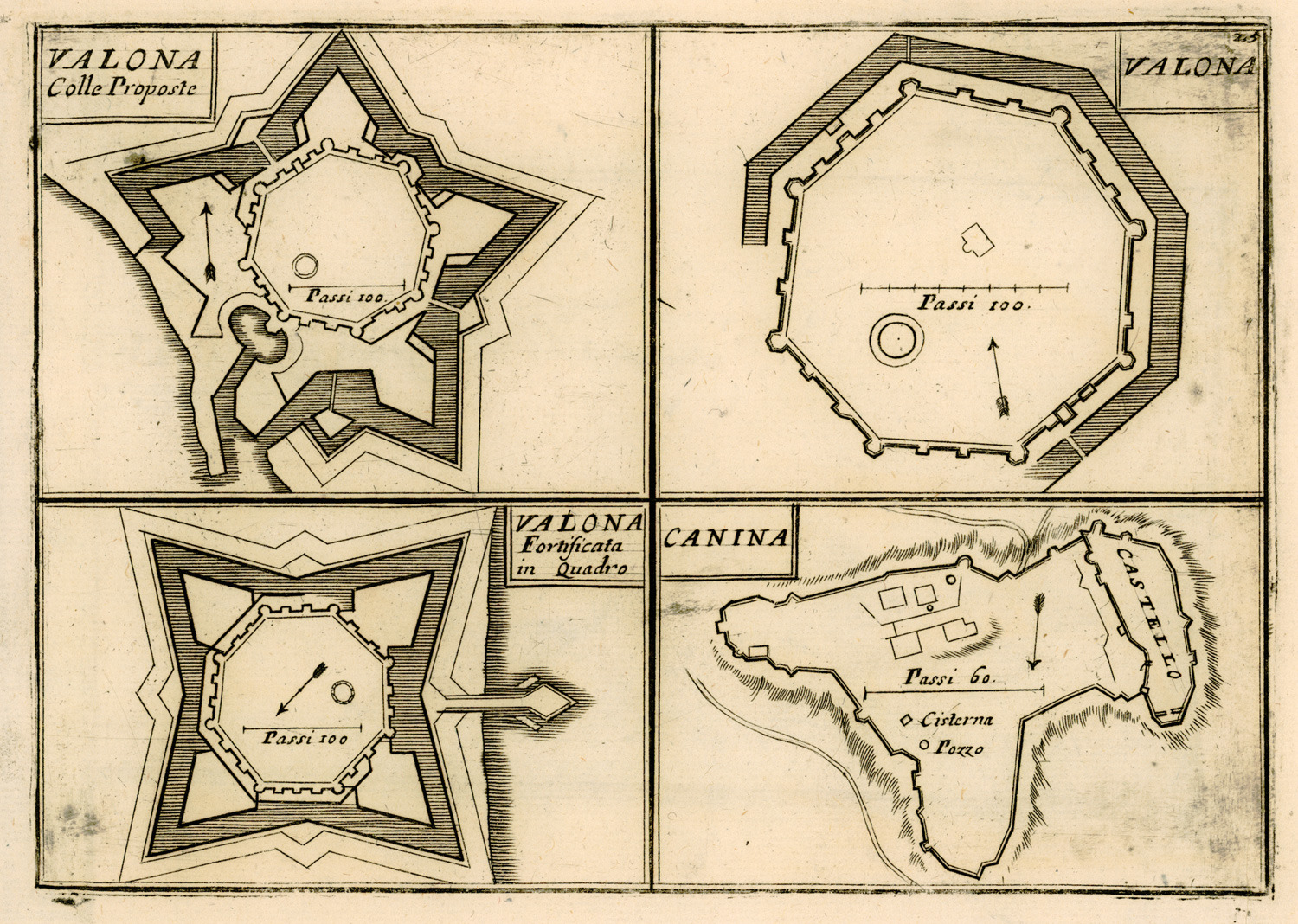
Drawings of Vlorë and Kaninë fortresses and hypothetical Venetian proposed plans of redesign

Aulon, no longer being a residential bishopric, is today listed by the Catholic Church as a titular see, a suffragan bishop of Durrës, being distinguished from a Greek titular see called Aulon by the use for it of the adjective Aulonitanus, while the adjective regarding the Aulon in Euboea (Ionian Greece) is Aulonensis. The diocese was nominally restored as Latin titular bishopric Aulon, or Valona in Curiate Italian; from 1925 it was (als) named Aulona in Latin and/or Italian, since 1933 it's only Aulon in Latin, Aulona in Italian. It was a bishopric from the fifth century until Bulgarian rule.

=== Middle Ages ===
In the 11th and 12th century, Vlorë played an instrumental role in the conflicts between the Byzantine Empire and Norman Kingdom of Sicily. Following Norman occupation, they ruled for only four years and established a Latin church episcopal see in Vlorë. In 1321 the city being under Byzantine control was attacked by a Venetian fleet under Giovanni Michiel as a result costing the lives of many of its Greek inhabitants. Vlorë served as capital of the Principality of Valona, initially a vassal state to the Serbian Empire, and later, independent Christian state from 1346 to 1417.

The Ottoman Empire captured the city in 1417, while in 1432, Albanian rebels freed Vlorë and expelled the Ottomans from the area. As part of the Ottoman Empire, Vlorë became a sanjak centre in Rumelia Eyalet under the name Avlonya. In 1690, it became a Venetian possession, and the city was restored to the Ottomans in 1691 after the siege of Vlorë, becoming a kaza of the Sanjak of Avlona in the vilayet (province) of Janina. At the time the city had about 10,000 inhabitants; there was a Catholic parish, which belonged to the Archdiocese of Durrës. During the early period of Ottoman rule, Vlorë became an international port centered on a high volume of trade between western Europe and the Ottoman state.

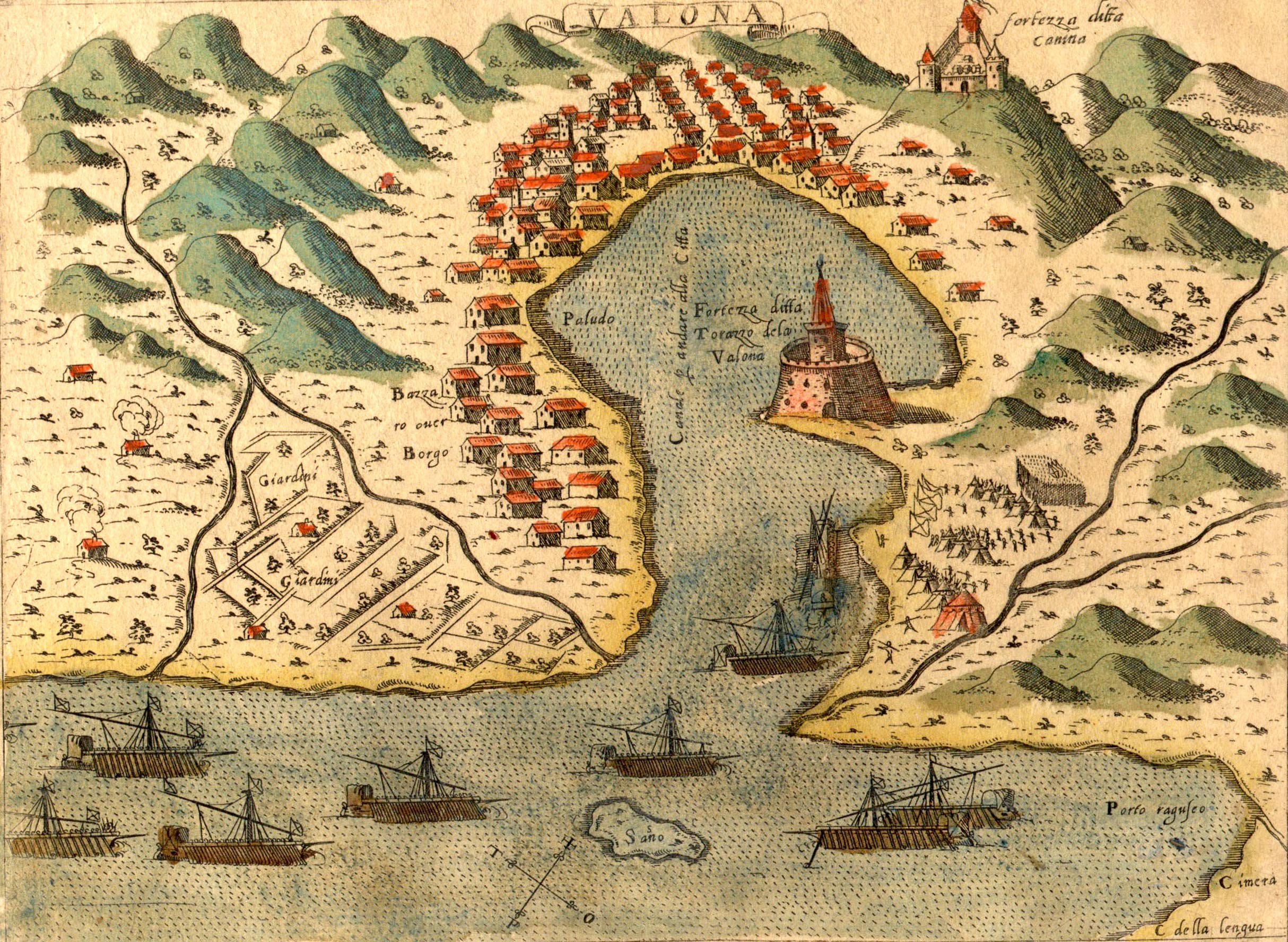
Map of Simon Pinargenti Valona in 1573

In 1426, the Ottomans supported the settlement of a Jewish community involved in mercantile activities. The community underwent population growth in subsequent decades with Jews migrating from Corfu, Venetian ruled lands, Naples, France, and the Iberian Peninsula. Around seventy Jewish families from Valencia, including former conversos, settled in Vlorë between 1391 and 1492. Following the expulsion of Jews from Spain in 1492, the Ottoman state resettled additional Jewish exiles in Vlorë toward the end of the fifteenth century. Ottoman censuses for 1506 and 1520 recorded the Jewish population as consisting of 528 families and some 2,600 people in Vlorë. The Jews of Vlorë were involved in trade and the city imported items from Europe and exported spices, leather, cotton fabrics, velvets, brocades, and mohair from the Ottoman cities of Istanbul and Bursa. The Vlorë Jewish community took an active role in the welfare of other Jews such as managing to attain the release of war related captives present in Durrës in 1596. After the Battle of Lepanto (1571) and the deterioration of security along the Ottoman controlled Adriatic and Ionian coasts, the numbers of Jews within Vlorë decreased.

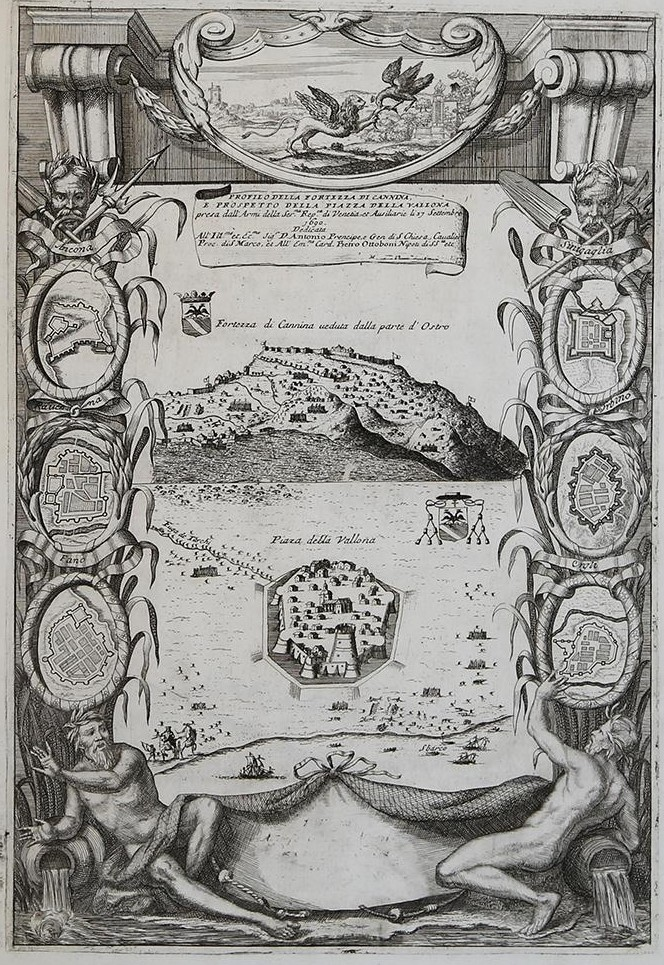
Drawing of Kanina Castle and Vlora Castle

=== Albanian Renaissance ===
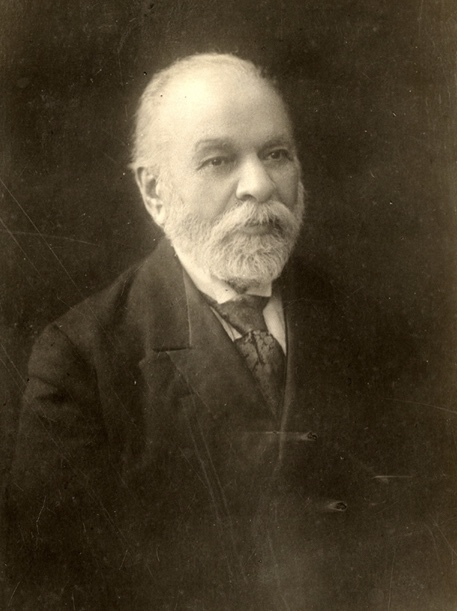
Ismail Qemali is regarded as the principal author of the Declaration of Independence and founding father of the modern Albanian nation.

Between the 18th and 19th centuries, cultural developments led to the Albanian Renaissance with Vlorë becoming an epicenter of the movement in 1912. In 1833, Vlorë was captured by Albanian rebels forcing the Ottoman government to abolish taxes and comply to rebel requests. In 1851, it suffered severely from an earthquake. The Jewish community of Yanina renewed the Jewish community of Vlorë in the nineteenth century.

On 28 November 1912, Ismail Qemali headed the Albanian Declaration of Independence in Vlorë, during the First Balkan War. The city became Albania's first capital following its independence. The 1914 Vlorë Raid took place that January, and was a short-lived plot to regain Albania under Ottoman control. The city was invaded by Italy in 1914 during World War I. The city remained occupied by Italian forces until an Albanian rebellion forced the Italians out of Albania in 1920. Italy invaded Vlorë again in 1939. The city remained under Italian occupation until Italy surrendered to the allies in 1943. Subsequently, Nazi Germany occupied the city until 1944. The city was liberated in 1944 by communist forces under Enver Hoxha.

=== Communist Albania ===
During World War II, Sazan Island became the site of a German and Italian submarine base and naval installations; these installations were heavily bombed by the Allies. After World War II, with Albania ruled by a Communist Party, the port was leased out to the Soviet Union for use as a submarine base. During 1960 and 1961 it served as a theater in the aftermath of the decision of Enver Hoxha to denounce Nikita Khrushchev's reforms.

In April 1961 the Soviet Union, resenting being pushed out after considerable investment in the naval facilities at nearby Pasha Liman Base, threatened to occupy Vlora with Soviet troops, and cut off all Soviet economic, military and technical aid to Albania. The threat was not carried out, as a result of the simultaneous international developments; most notably the Cuban Missile Crisis. Hoxha, realizing the vulnerability of Albania after the 1968 Warsaw Pact invasion of Czechoslovakia, ordered the construction of hundreds of thousands of concrete bunkers. Under Hoxha, Vlorë served as an important recruiting centre for the Sigurimi; the Albanian state security, intelligence and secret police service.

In 1997, Vlorë was the center of the 1997 Albanian civil unrest after the collapse of several investment scams that led to the downfall of the Sali Berisha administration.

== Geography ==
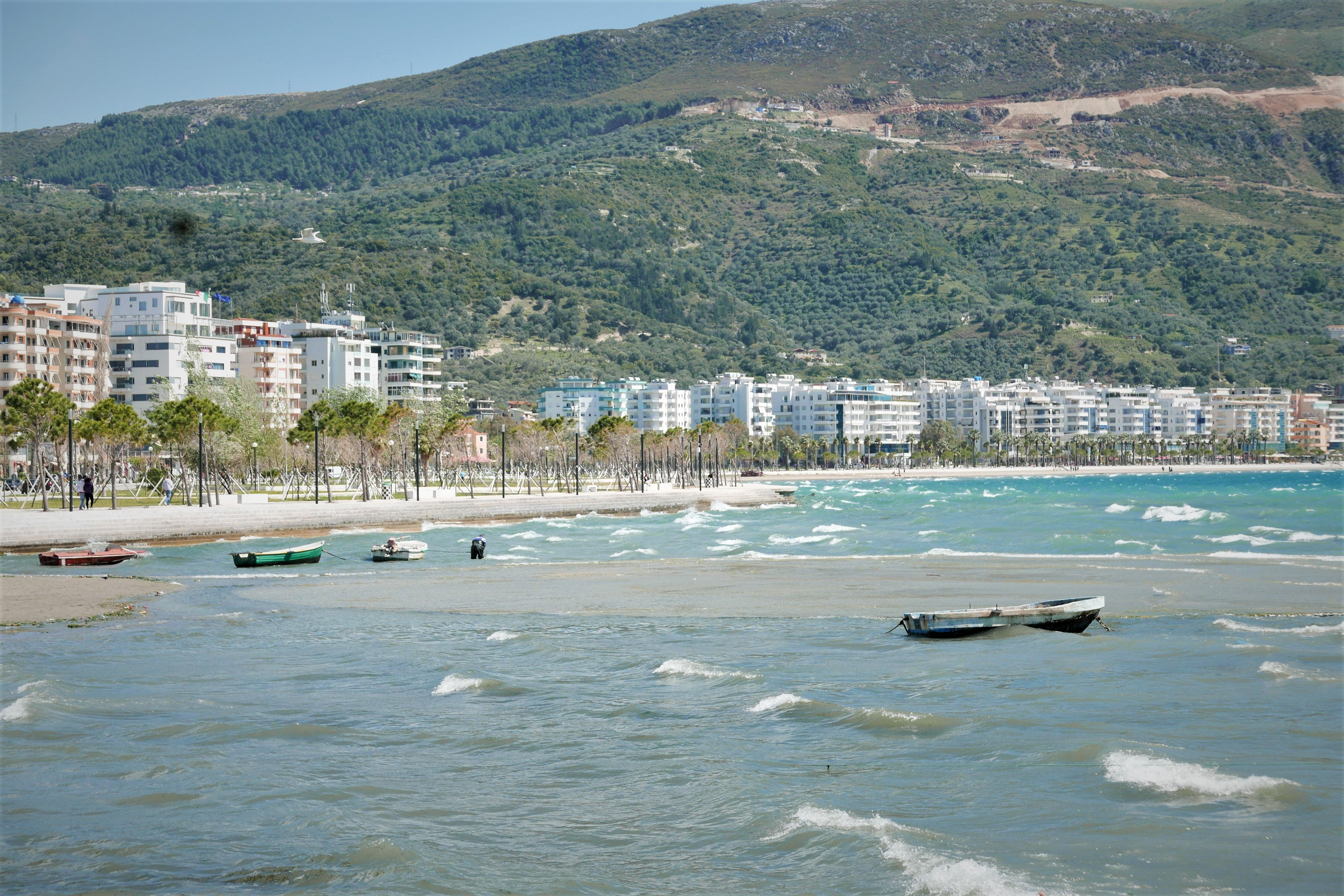
View of the promenade of Vlorë and the Ceraunian Mountains in the hinterlands

Vlorë is situated on the Bay of Vlorë along the Albanian Adriatic and Ionian Sea Coasts in the eastern part of the Strait of Otranto surrounded by the foothills of the Ceraunian Mountains. Defined in an area of 647.94 km^{2} (250.17 sq mi), Vlorë Municipality is encompassed in Vlorë County as part of the Southern Region of Albania and consists of the adjacent administrative units of Novoselë, Orikum, Qendër Vlorë, Shushicë and Vlorë. The municipality stretches from the mouth of Vjosë in the north along the Narta Lagoon to the Llogara Pass in the south. It also encloses the Karaburun Peninsula and Sazan Island in the west with the Shushica-Vlorë River forming its eastern border. Protected areas include the Karaburun-Sazan Marine Park, Llogara National Park and Vjosa Wild River National Park. Valonia oak, the mass name for acorn cups obtained in the neighboring oak forests and used by tanners, derives its name from Valona, the ancient name of Vlorë.

=== Climate ===
Vlorë has a hot-summer Mediterranean climate (Köppen climate classification: Csa), with an average annual temperature of 16.9 °C (62.4 °F). Summers in Vlorë are dry and hot while winters are mild and rainy. The warmest month is August with an average temperature rising to 26.8 °C (80.2 °F). By contrast, the coldest month is January with an average temperature falling to 7.9 °C (46.2 °F). Vlorë has a sunny climate with an average of 2,745.2 hours of sunshine annually. July is the sunniest month of the year with an average of about 12 hours of sunshine a day. By contrast, the average hours of sunshine are less than 7 hours per day in January. During the 1961–1990 period, on average per year, there were 82 days with more than 1 mm (0.039 in) of rainfall, 26 days with thunders, five days with hail, and one day of snowfall.

Climate data for Vlorë
Month	Jan	Feb	Mar	Apr	May	Jun	Jul	Aug	Sep	Oct	Nov	Dec	Year
Record high °C (°F)	23.6 (74.5)	29.6 (85.3)	28.4 (83.1)	29.6 (85.3)	37.2 (99.0)	41.0 (105.8)	41.6 (106.9)	38.0 (100.4)	38.0 (100.4)	31.8 (89.2)	28.5 (83.3)	24.5 (76.1)	41.6 (106.9)
Mean daily maximum °C (°F)	13.2 (55.8)	13.9 (57.0)	15.9 (60.6)	19.0 (66.2)	23.2 (73.8)	27.0 (80.6)	29.7 (85.5)	29.8 (85.6)	27.0 (80.6)	22.8 (73.0)	18.2 (64.8)	14.5 (58.1)	21.2 (70.1)
Daily mean °C (°F)	10 (50)	10 (50)	12 (54)	15 (59)	19 (66)	22 (72)	25 (77)	25 (77)	22 (72)	19 (66)	15 (59)	12 (54)	17 (63)
Mean daily minimum °C (°F)	4.8 (40.6)	5.3 (41.5)	6.6 (43.9)	9.6 (49.3)	13.2 (55.8)	16.6 (61.9)	18.4 (65.1)	18.3 (64.9)	15.9 (60.6)	12.5 (54.5)	9.5 (49.1)	6.3 (43.3)	11.4 (52.5)
Record low °C (°F)	−7.0 (19.4)	−4.8 (23.4)	−6.3 (20.7)	−0.5 (31.1)	4.6 (40.3)	10.1 (50.2)	11.4 (52.5)	12.2 (54.0)	6.6 (43.9)	−3.0 (26.6)	−0.6 (30.9)	−3.5 (25.7)	−7.0 (19.4)
Average precipitation mm (inches)	113.5 (4.47)	86.3 (3.40)	90.4 (3.56)	65.3 (2.57)	56.8 (2.24)	19.1 (0.75)	12.4 (0.49)	21.1 (0.83)	69.2 (2.72)	124.1 (4.89)	138.4 (5.45)	145.0 (5.71)	941.6 (37.08)
Average precipitation days	13	12	14	11	9	6	3	3	5	10	17	17	120
Mean monthly sunshine hours	133.3	147.9	173.6	225.0	272.8	318.0	368.9	344.1	279.0	210.8	117.0	99.2	2,689.6
Mean daily sunshine hours	4	5	5	7	8	10	11	11	9	6	3	3	7
Mean daily daylight hours	9	10	11	13	14	15	14	13	12	11	9	9	12
Source 1: NOAA (extremes 1961–1990)
Source 2:

== Economy ==
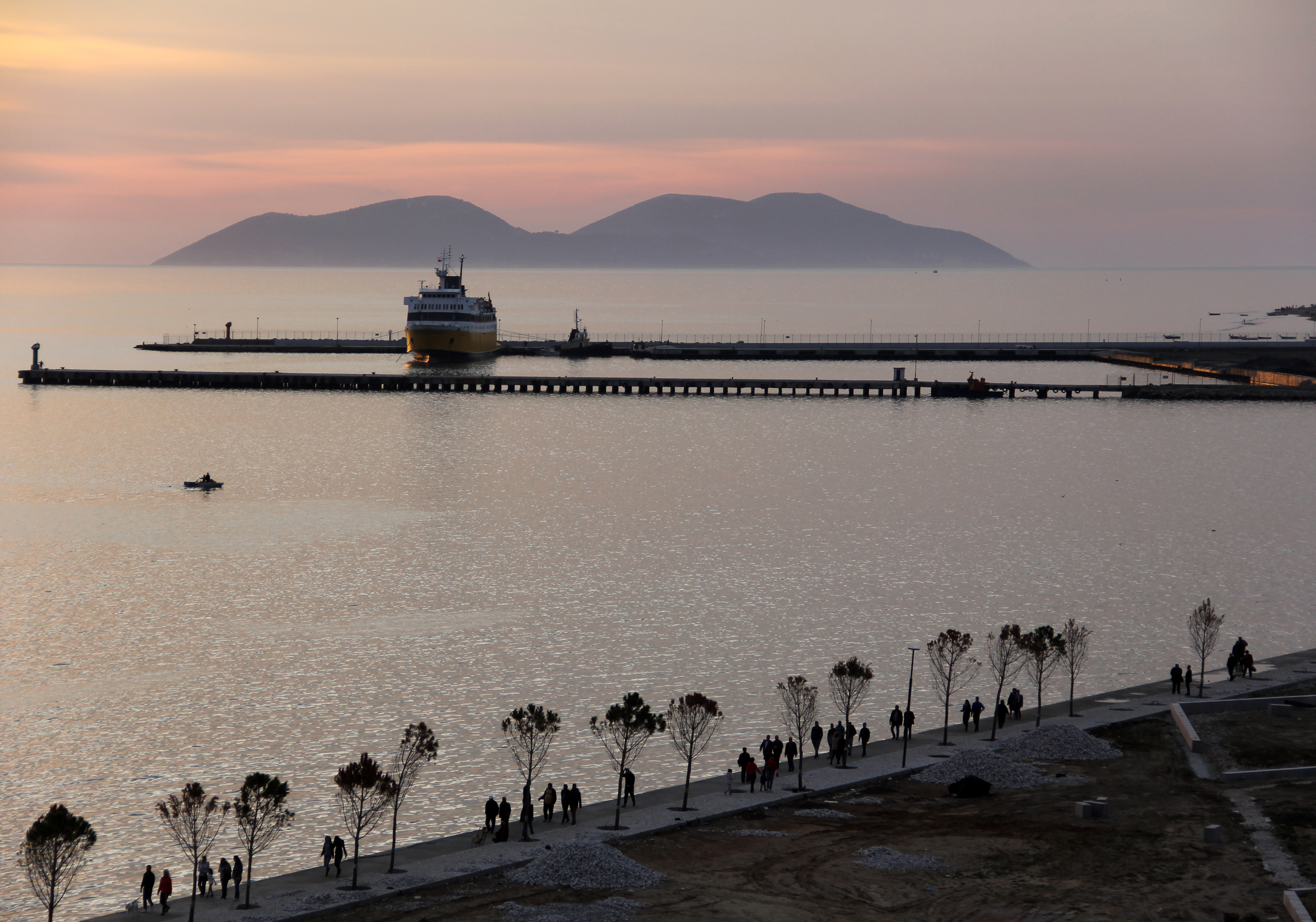
View of a ship in the Port of Vlorë

The city of Vlorë remains a major seaport and commercial centre, with a significant fishing and industrial sector. The surrounding region produces petroleum, natural gas, bitumen and salt. The city is also the location of important installations of the Albanian Navy. It has grown in importance as an agricultural center with a very large-scale planting of olive and fruit trees, and as a center of the food processing, oil, and bitumen export industries. Historically, the surrounding district was mainly agricultural and pastoral, producing oats, maize, cotton, olive oil, cattle, sheep, skins, hides, and butter. These commodities are exported.

Vlorë is a vibrant coastal city with a well-developed and modern housing infrastructure. The city offers a variety of residential areas ranging from the coast and going inland. Vlorë is divided into three economic zones. The Technical and Economic Development Area (TEDA) in Vlorë has a strategic location, some 151 kilometres (94 miles) away from the capital Tirana. The Land and Environmental Information is located in a flat, saline land, partially covered by the Soda Forest. The area is suitable for industrial and environmentally friendly development. The eligible activities for the development inside the TEDA zone are: industrial, processing, commercial, goods storage, light industry, electronics, auto parts manufacturing, and port related activities. Official data from 2014 reported the employable labor force in Vlora at 125,954, of which 84,836 are currently employed; 35% of the labor force in Vlora had a high school degree, while 17% had a university degree.

According to the World Bank, Vlorë has made significant steps in the economy rankings in 2016. Vlorë ranks 7th among 22 cities in Southeastern Europe in rankings conducted by the World Bank Group. ahead of the capital of Albania, Tirana, and also Belgrade, Serbia and Sarajevo, in Bosnia and Herzegovina.

Tourism which has always been a driving force for the city's economy has become a major industry in recent years, with many hotels, recreational centers, and vast beaches. The city has a good view over the Bay of Vlorë, which is considered the frontier between the Adriatic Sea and the Ionian Sea. The Island of Sazan is in front of the city, at the entrance of the bay. Italy is just 80 kilometres (50 miles) away. Beaches close to the city include Palasë, Dhermi, Vuno, Himara, Qeparo, and Borsh. In 2019, Vlorë was cited in Financial Times' 'Five destinations to watch' article that listed new and exciting holiday destinations from around the world.

In April 2024, it was reported that Jared Kushner, son-in-law and former aide to US President Donald Trump, planned to build a resort in the city as part of plans of his company, Affinity Partners, to invest in the Balkans.

== Infrastructure ==
=== Transport ===
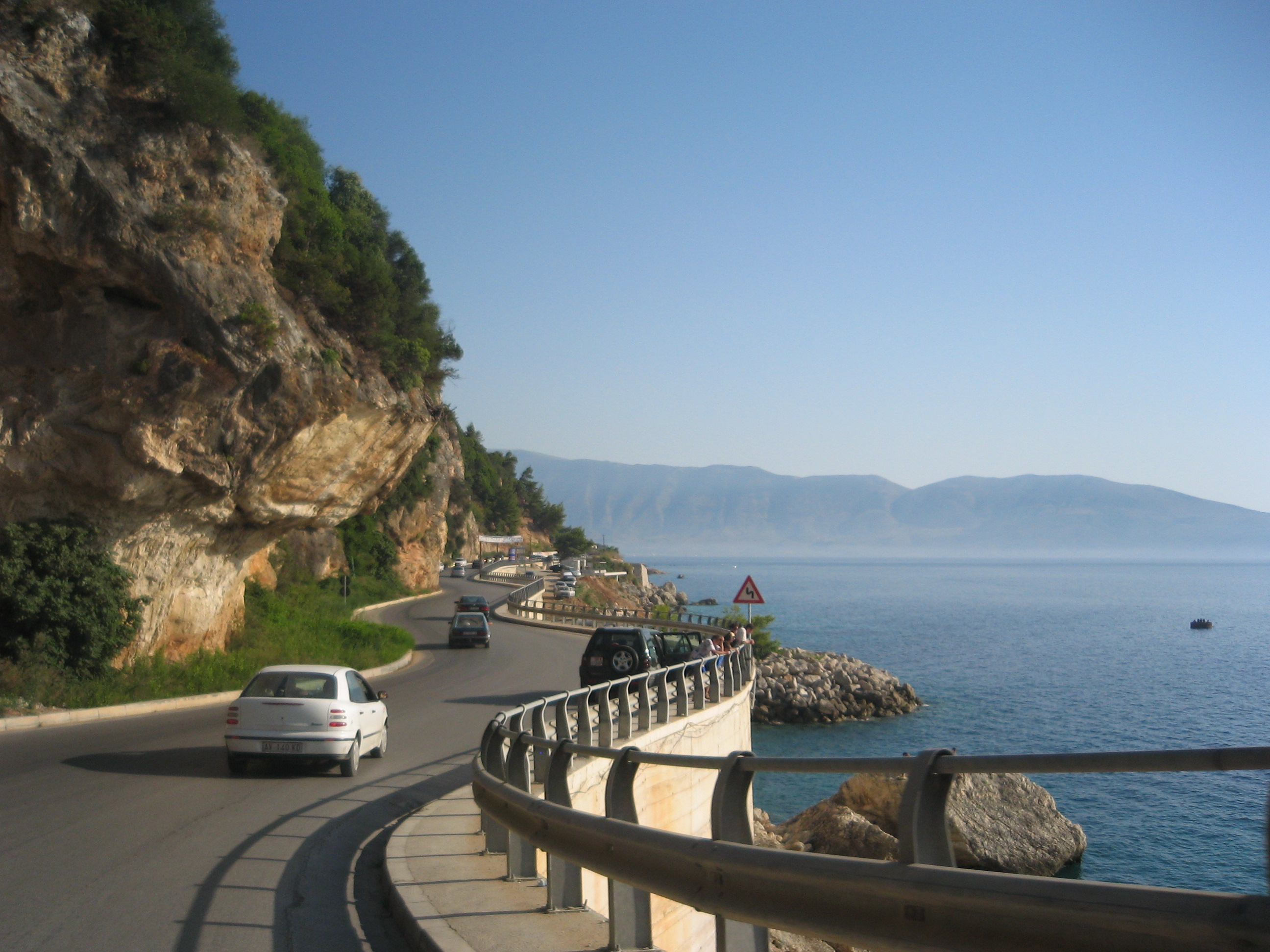
The SH8 highway in southern Vlorë leading to Orikum

Vlorë lies on the north–south transportation corridor of Albania and is served by a network of motorways and highways connecting the city to other parts of Albania. The preceding SH8 highway, beginning from Fier, links the northern districts of Vlorë with the central and southern districts, continuing along the Albanian Riviera to Sarandë. The A2 motorway parallelly runs along the SH8 from Fier to Vlorë and terminates after entering the city in the north. Upon completion, the bypass of Vlorë will link the A2 motorway through the suburbs of Vlorë with the SH8 highway.

Vlorë is served by the Port of Vlorë, the second busiest port in Albania, located in the northern part of the city's coast.

The Vlorë railway station is the southern terminus of the Durrës-Vlorë railway line which connects Vlorë with Durrës and the rest of the Albanian rail network. It opened in 1985 when the railway line was extended from Fier to Vlorë. A very limited service remained in operation until 2015, but currently passenger services no longer run south of Fier. However, a private railway company, Albrail, started operation of freight trains from Fier to Vlorë in 2018.

The Vlorë International Airport is a proposed airport development project currently under construction as part of Albania's plan to increase transportation links to destinations in southern Albania. The proposed location for the airport lies at the village of Akërni within the Vjosa-Narta Protected Landscape in the north of Vlorë, which was met with widespread criticism. The construction was officially launched on 28 November 2021, and has a completion target date of April 2024.

=== Landfill ===
During the period 2020–2024, the city periodically suffered from fires at the local landfill. The landfill, which is considered dangerous by the local authorities, was due to close by June 2021, as a new landfill was expected to begin operations. The deadline for the opening of the latter has been postponed repeatedly, and its further construction has stopped.

=== Education ===
Vlora is home to the second largest university in Albania. The University of Vlora was founded in 1994 as a technological university. It retains a focus on technology, but has expanded in the areas of economics and finance, education, medicine, and law.

There are three journals based in the University of Vlora. There is also a scientific journal published quarterly in Albanian: Buletini Shkencor i Universitetit te Vlorës. Since 2008 it is home to the Academicus International Scientific Journal, a peer-reviewed scientific publication in the English language founded by Arta Musaraj.

Besides the state university there are two private universities, namely Universiteti Pavarësia Vlorë and Akademia e Studimeve të Aplikuara "Reald", which started as primary school and high school, and since 2011 operates also as a university.

== Demographics ==
Historical population
Year	Pop.	±%
1923	5,942	—
1927	6,210	+4.5%
1938	9,948	+60.2%
1950	14,221	+43.0%
1960	41,423	+191.3%
1969	45,500	+9.8%
1979	56,200	+23.5%
1989	71,662	+27.5%
2001	77,652	+8.4%
2011	79,513	+2.4%
2023	66,320	−16.6%

As per the Institute of Statistics estimate from the 2011 census, there were 79,513 people residing in Vlorë and 104,827 in the municipality of Vlorë, constituting the third most populous city and fifth most populous municipality of Albania. The estimated population density of Vlorë Municipality was at 169.9 inhabitants per square kilometre. The population of Vlorë had increased from 71,662 in 1989 to 79,513 in 2011, while a decline of the population of Vlorë Municipality from 114,497 to 104,827 was highlighted.

Despite being a Muslim-majority country, the constitution defines Albania as a secular country with no official religion. It guarantees the freedom of religion, belief and conscience and prohibits discrimination on grounds of religious beliefs or practice. Vlorë is religiously diverse and possesses many places of worship catering to its religious population, who are traditionally adherents of Islam, Christianity, and Judaism. During the 19th and early 20th century, Albanian-speaking Muslims were the majority population of Vlorë while there was a small number of Greek-speaking families, Albanian Orthodox, Jews, and an even smaller number of Catholics. In 1994 the ethnic Greek community of the city numbered 8,000 people. A Greek school was operating in the city in 1741.

== Culture ==
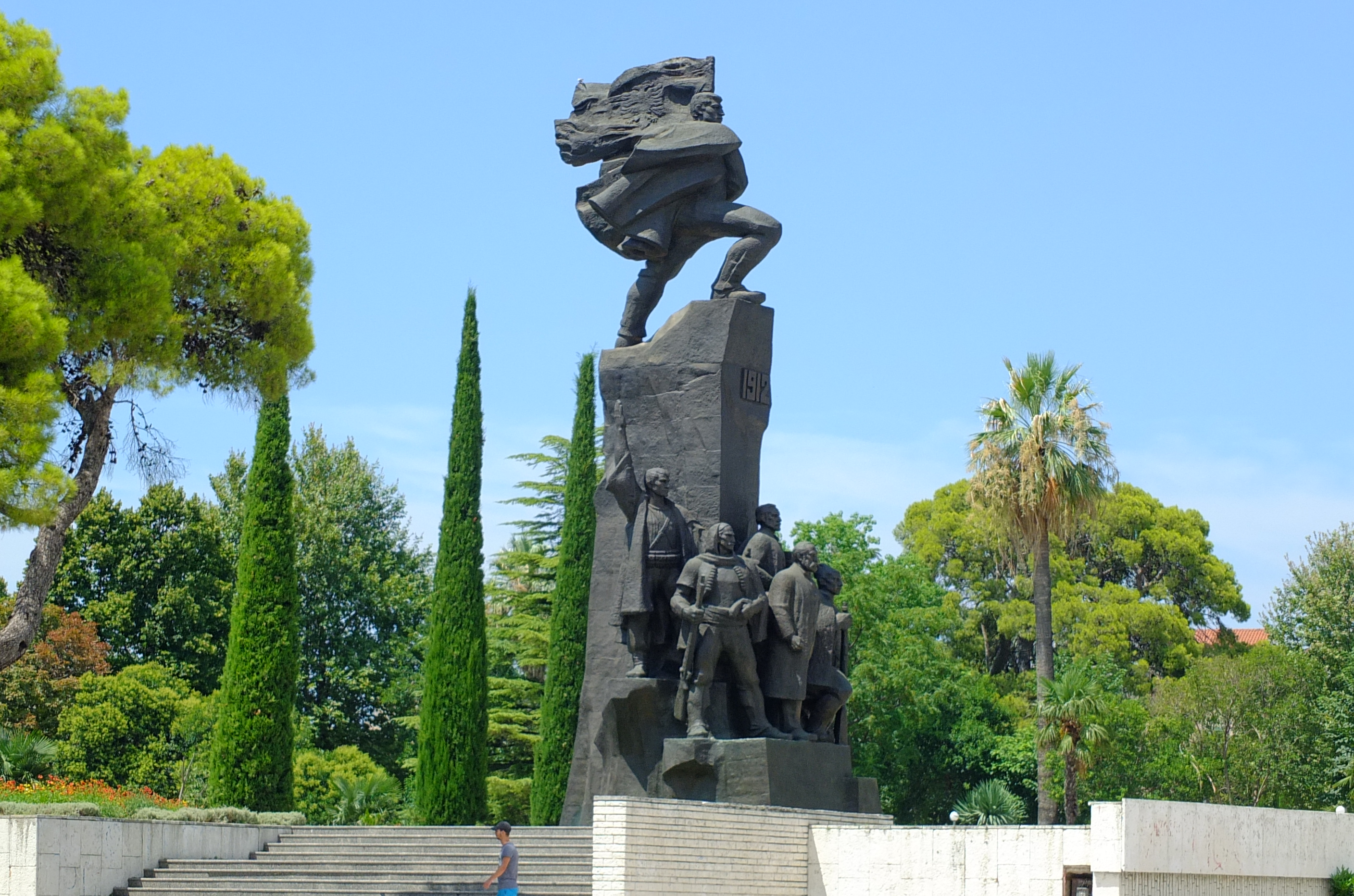
Monument of Independence on the Flag's Square

Vlorë is geographically and culturally encompassed in the historical region of Labëria, extending from the Albanian Adriatic and Ionian Sea Coasts to the mountainous region of southeastern Albania. Labëria is distinguished for its distinct culture, landscapes and traditions and known as the birthplace of Albanian polyphonic music, which has been proclaimed by UNESCO a Masterpiece of the Oral and Intangible Heritage of Humanity. Most of the Albanian inhabitants of Vlorë speak the Lab dialect of southern Tosk Albanian that differs from other Albanian dialects.

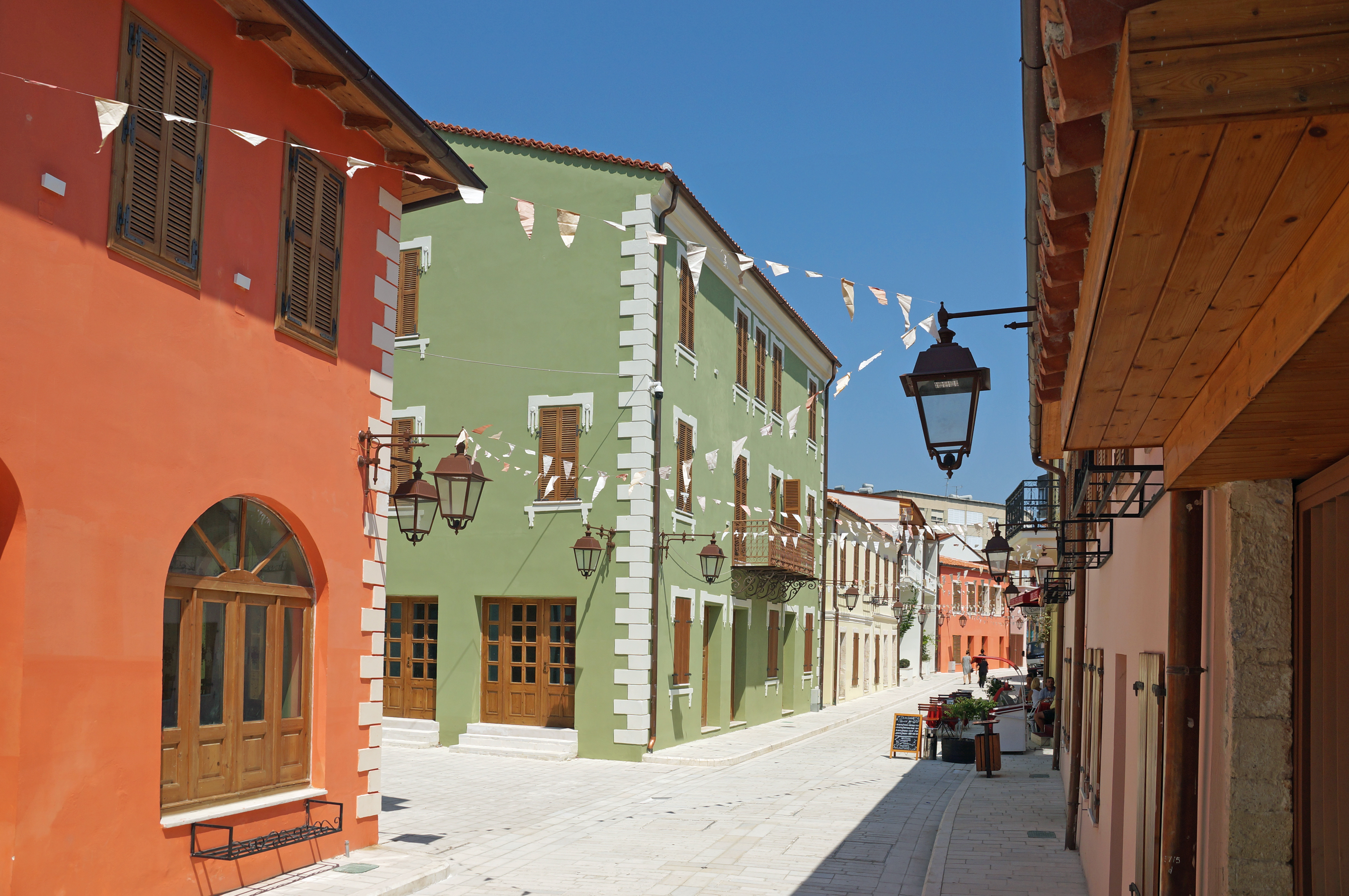
Historical center of Vlorë at the Justin Godart Street

Vlorë is home to many cultural and historical sites that also relate to the founding of Albania. The Monument of Independence is located on the Flag's Square and commemorates the Albanian independence from the Ottoman Empire. Museum of Independence is housed in a 19th-century building, where the founding fathers of Albania signed the Declaration of Independence. Its balcony is considered a symbol of freedom, victory and resilience of the Albanians to prevent the occupation of their motherland.

Located in a 19th-century mansion, the Ethnographic Museum close to the Museum of Independence displays the ethnographic heritage of Vlorë and its surrounding region. The History Museum at the Perlat Rexhepi Street is another museum exhibiting among others artefacts from the nearby archaeological sites of the Illyrians and Ancient Greeks. A museum dedicated to the historical Jewish population of Vlorë is planned to open in the historical center of Vlorë.

Among the most outstanding religious sites in Vlorë are the Muradie Mosque built in the 16th century at the Sadik Zotaj Street and the Saint Aloysius Gonzaga and Mary Church from the 19th century at the Kristoforidhi Street. Notable cultural sites in Vlorë Municipality include the Castle of Kaninë, Church of Marmiroi, Island of Sazan, Island of Zvërnec, Lagoon of Narta as well as the archaeological sites of Amantia and Oricum.

The oldest and most popular first division team based in Vlorë is the football club KS Flamurtari Vlorë. Flamurtari plays at Flamurtari Stadium in the center of Vlorë near the Independence Square.

== International relations ==
Vlorë is twinned with:

- Hollywood, Florida, United States
- Yangzhou, China

== Gallery ==
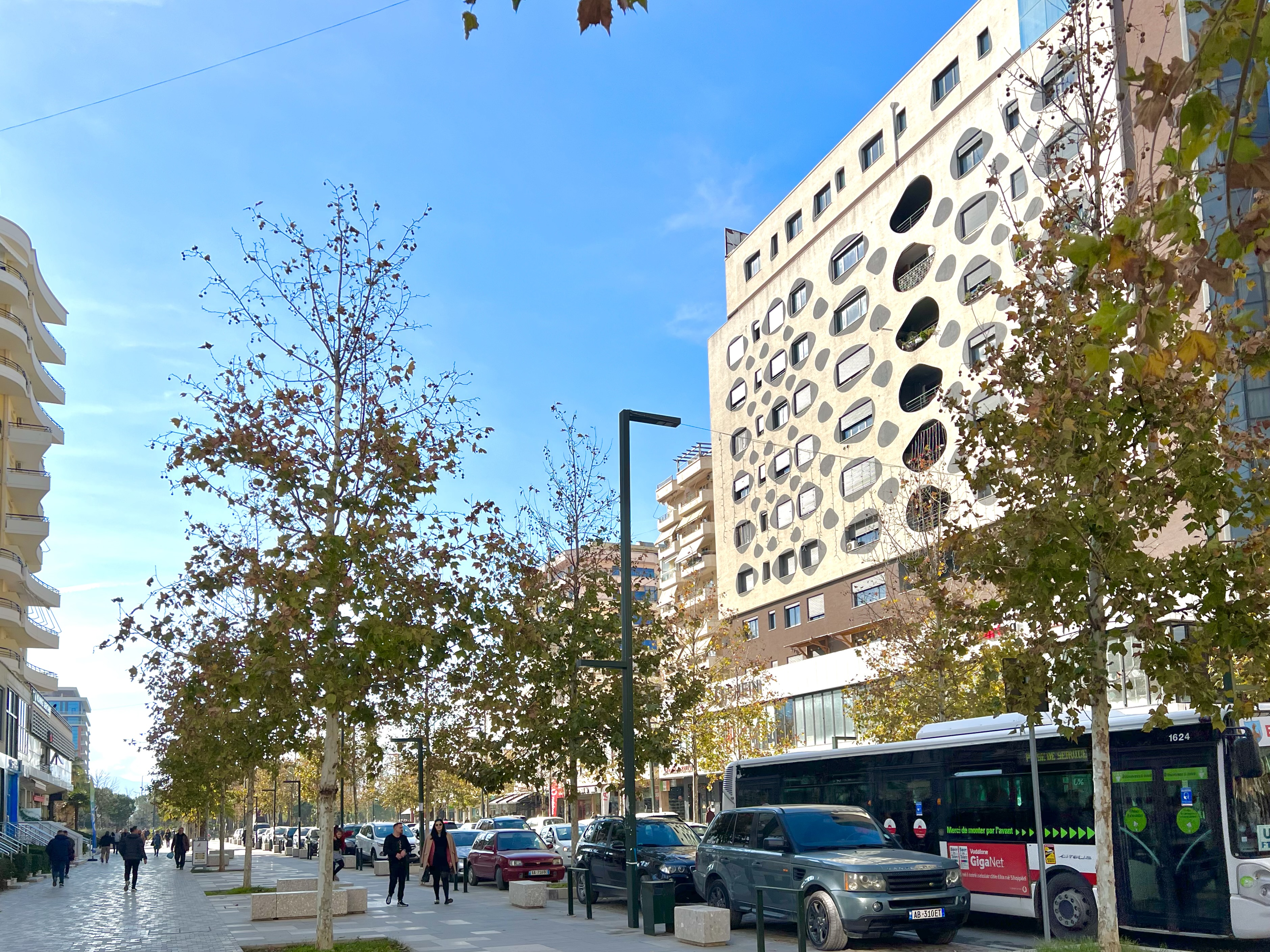
A typical street in Vlorë showing high rise buildings in the city

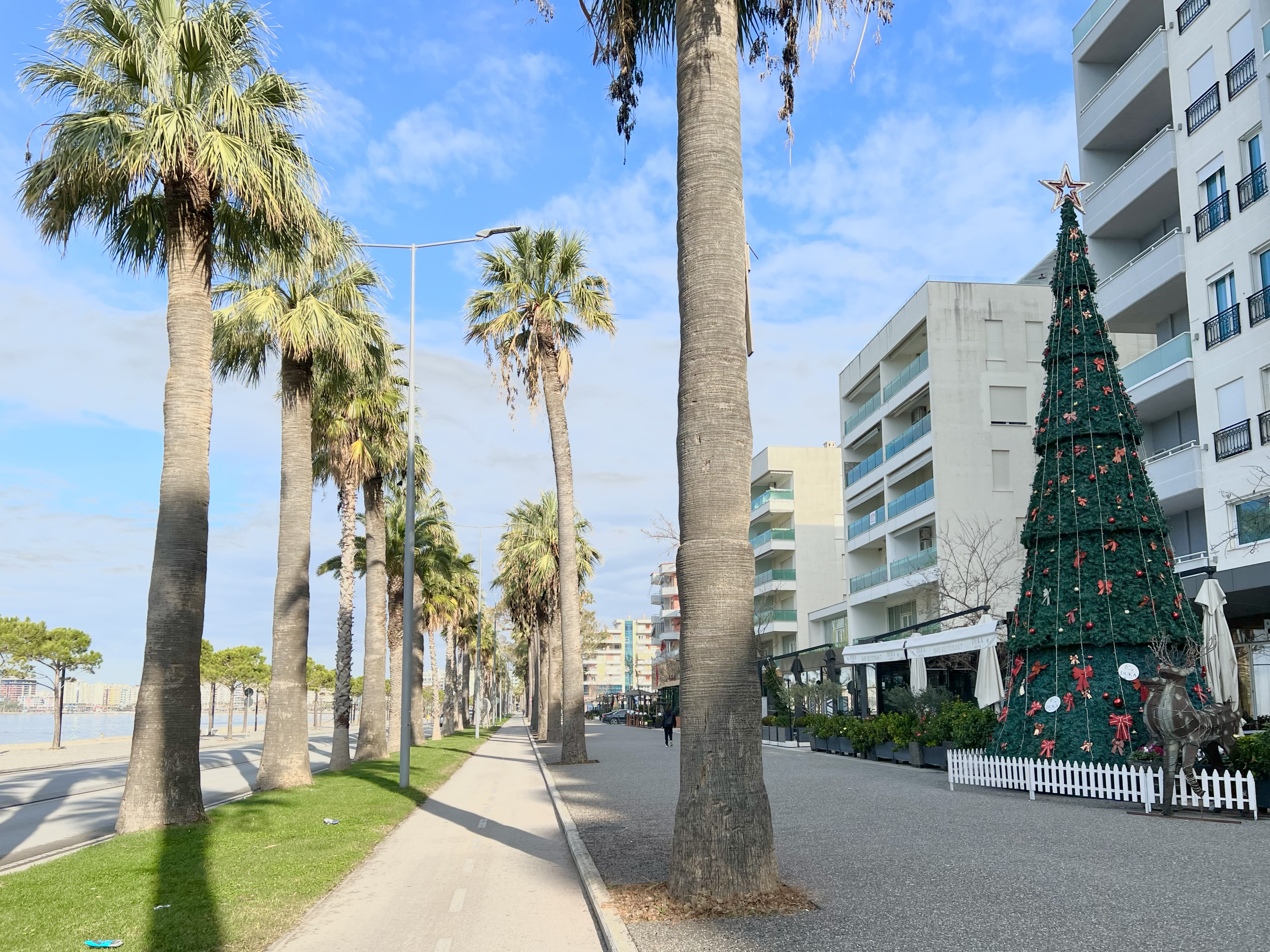
A typical street in Vlorë showing some palm trees and the Christmas tree

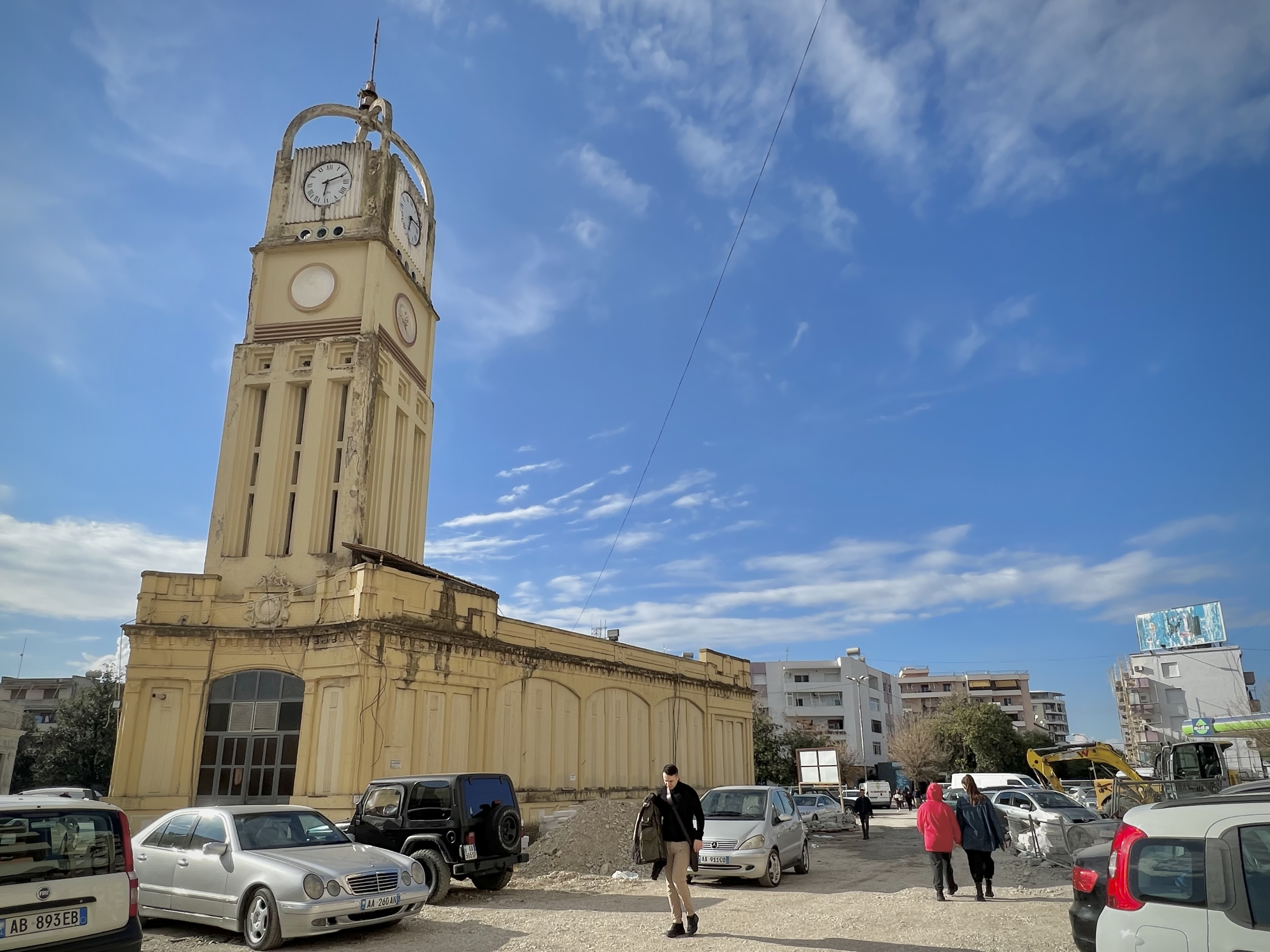
The old town of Vlorë

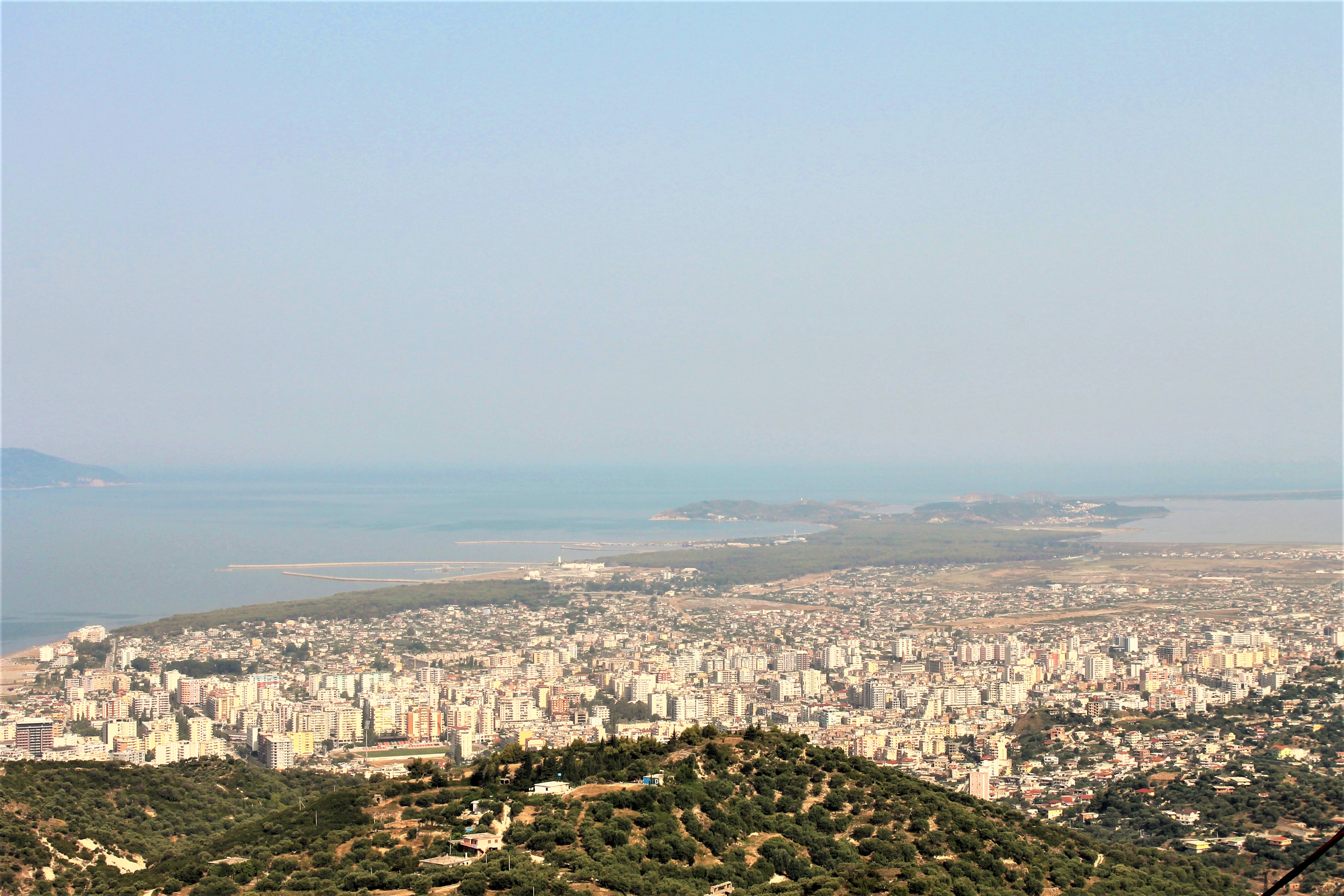
The panorama of Vlorë

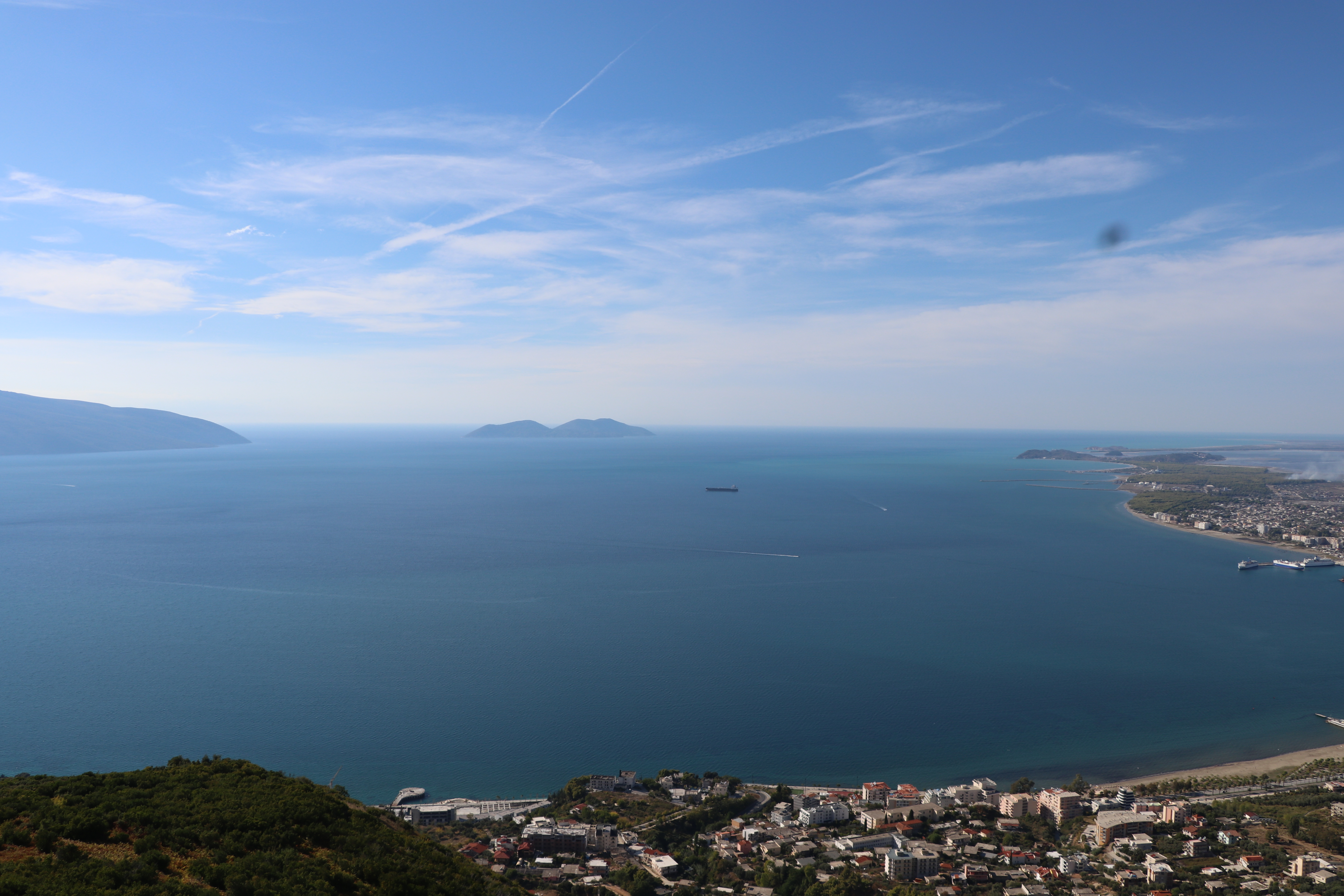
The bay of Vlorë

== See also ==
- List of mayors of Vlorë
- List of people from Vlorë
- List of Catholic dioceses in Albania

== Bibliography ==
- Bereti, Vasil (1993). "Gjurmë të fortifikimeve në vendbanimin në Treport / Traces de fortifications dans l'habitat à Treport". Iliria (in Albanian). 23: 143–159. doi:10.3406/iliri.1993.1622.
- Bereti, Vasil; Quantin, François; Cabanes, Pierre (2011). "Histoire et épigraphie dans la région de Vlora (Albanie)". REA (in French). 113 (1).
- Bowden, William (2003). Epirus Vetus: The Archaeology of a Late Antique Province (Duckworth Archaeology). Bloomsbury Academic. p. 14. ISBN 0-7156-3116-0.
- Chisholm, Hugh, ed. (1911). "Avlona" . Encyclopædia Britannica (11th ed.). Cambridge University Press. pp. 65–66.
- Fasolo, Michele (2005) [2003]. La via Egnatia I. Da Apollonia e Dyrrachium ad Herakleia Lynkestidos. Viae Publicae Romanae (in Italian). Vol. 1. Rome: Istituto Grafico Editoriale Romano.
- Volpe, Giuliano; Disantarosa, Giacomo; Leone, Danilo; Turchiano, Maria (2014). "Porti, approdi e itinerari dell'Albania meridionale dall'Antichità al Medioevo. Il 'Progetto Liburna'". Ricerche Archeologiche in Albania. Aracne: 287–326. doi:10.4399/978885487245516 (inactive 13 November 2026). ISBN 978-88-548-7245-5.
