= Kristaq Mitro =

Albanian film director (1945–2023)

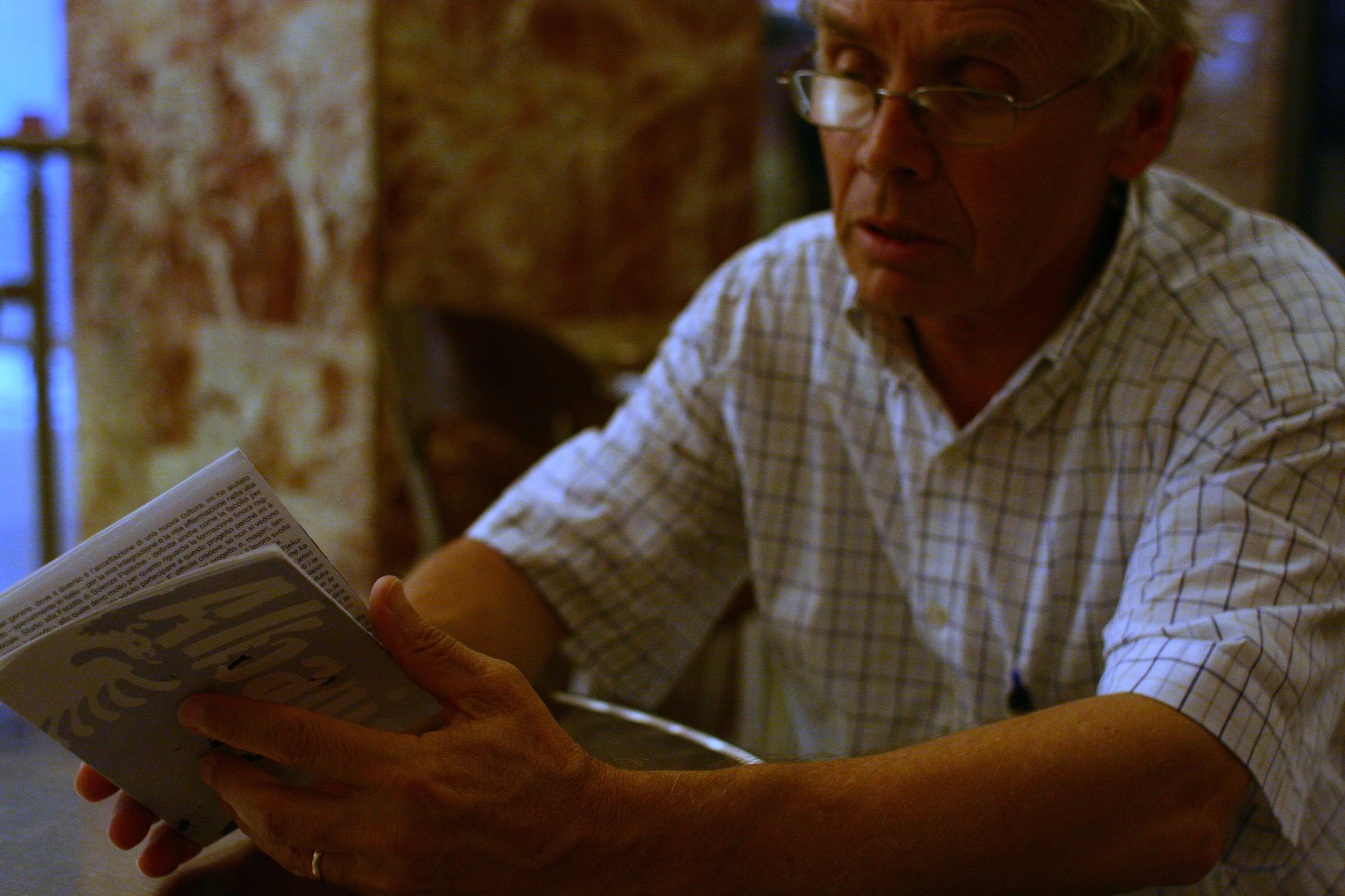
Kristaq Mitro in Tirana in 2008

Kristaq Mitro (1 December 1945 – 3 April 2023) was an Albanian film director. He was a professor at University of Arts, Tirana. He directed Apasionata in 1983 with Ibrahim Muçaj. Mitro died in Vienna on 3 April 2023, at the age of 77.

== Filmography ==
- Një djalë edhe një vajzë (1990)
- Telefoni i një mëngjesi (1987)
- Duaje emrin tënd (1984)
- Apasionata (1983)
- Njeriu i mirë (1982)
- Në prag të lirisë (1981)
- Liri a vdekje (1979)
- Nusja dhe shtetërrethimi (1978)
- Dimri i fundit (1976)
- Tokë e përgjakur (1976)
- Kur zbardhi një ditë (1971)
