= Palasë =

Palasë Παλάσα
- Village
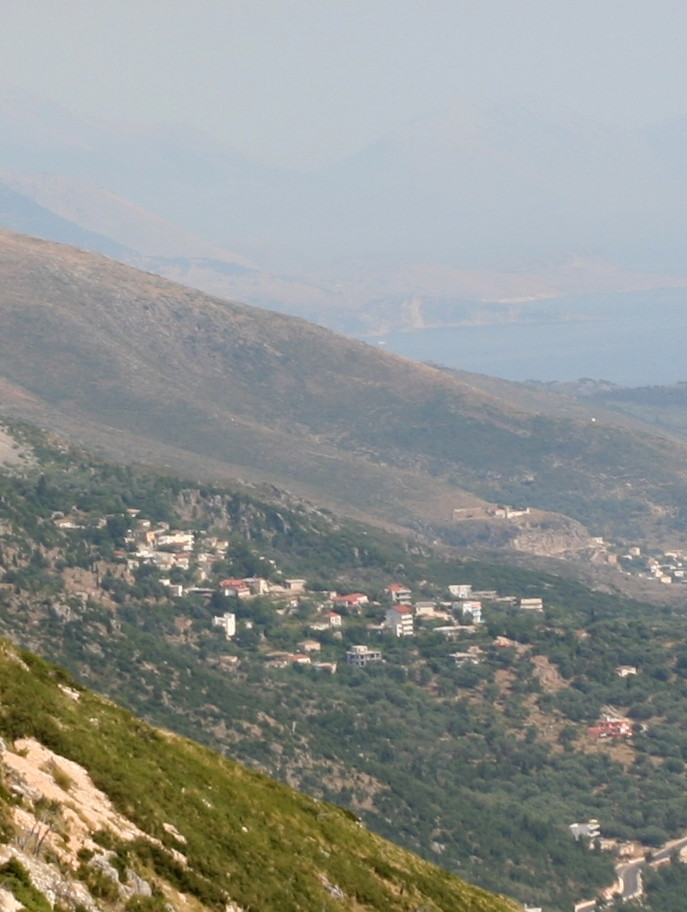

- Location within Albania
- Coordinates: 40°9′54″N 19°37′29″E
- Country: Albania
- County: Vlorë
- Municipality: Himarë
- Administrative unit: Himarë

Population
  - Total: 413
- Time zone: UTC+1 (CET)
  - Summer (DST): UTC+2 (CEST)

Palasë (Albanian definite form: Palasa; Greek: Παλάσα, romanized: Palása), also Paljasë (Albanian definite form: Paljasa; Greek: Παλιάσα, romanized: Paliása), is a village in Himarë municipality (13 kilometres from the town), Vlorë County, southern Albania. It is located near the Llogara National Park and next to the Ionian coast on the Albanian Riviera. The village is inhabited by ethnic Greeks who speak the unique Himariote Greek dialect.

== History ==
In classical antiquity, Roman writer Lucan recorded a site named Palaeste on the Ceraunian Mountains in Chaonia, which may correspond to modern-day Palasë. The name Palaeste is considered to be Illyrian. Palaeste was also considered as being geographically located in southern Illyria, next to Oricum. In Palaeste, Julius Caesar landed from Brundusium, in order to carry on the war against Pompey.

According to another local legend the settlement was initially located on the coast on a location once known as Meghalihora (Greek: Μεγάλη χώρα), but due to pirate attacks in 12th-13th century it was moved slightly inland. In the local Greek dialect of Himara the change /st/ > /s/ is a typical phonetic rule. Thus if Palaeste is linguistically connected with modern Greek Paliasa then this change must have taken place before 1582.

Palasë is recorded in the Ottoman defter of 1583 as a settlement in the Sanjak of Delvina with a total of 95 households. The anthroponymy recorded predominantly belonged to the Albanian onomastic sphere (e.g., Gjin Gjoni, Leka Kosta, Nika Pali), however, personal names reflecting broader Orthodox Christian anthroponymy - both Greek (e.g., Andrea Komnini, Jorgo Kristulli) and Slavic (e.g., Vaso Petko, Dhimo Bojko) - are also recorded.

In 1632 an Albanian school was established in Palasë. In 1663 a Greek school was established in Palasë.

The Italian missionary Giuseppe Schirò wrote in 1722 that Palasë was inhabited by Greeks. It is still not clear if there was any significant migration to or from the village. Andrei Sobolev in fieldwork in the 21st century further documented that the families Babe, Gjinajt, Çaço, Paço, Xhelilaj, and Mëhilli hailed from Dukat, while few others (Milaj, Papadhates) hailed from Krujë and the Peloponnese. In 1720, the villages of Himara, Palasa, Ilias, Vuno, Pilur and Qeparo refused to submit to the Pasha of Delvina.

Until the 1750s Himarë was composed of more than 50 villages, but by the end of the 1780s it comprised only 16, situated by the seashore from Saranda to Palasë. Later on, with Ali Pasha's defeat, the region of Himara shrunk to only seven villages. In 1872, a Greek elementary school was operating in Palasa sponsored by a wealthy local, Nasios Dimoulis.

In 1914 Palasa joined the movement of Spyros Spyromilios during the establishment of the Autonomous Republic of Northern Epirus. In September 1916, the provinces of Himarë and Tepelenë became part of the Vlorë prefecture and were placed under the control of the Italian armed forces. The city of Himarë became the official capital of the region and was responsible for the administration of the traditionally Orthodox coastal villages of Palasë, Dhërmi, Kudhës, Qeparo, Vuno and Iljas. With the incorporation of the region in the Albanian state the locals were officially recognized as part of the Greek minority. In 1934 part of the local population asked for intervention by the League of Nations for the opening of a Greek school in the village. However, the minority status in Palasë was revoked during the People's Republic of Albania with the explanation that there were not enough Greek speakers.

== Geography ==
The village is located several kilometres northwest of the town of Dhërmi, and is accessed via the main road leading out of the town. The Llogara Pass and Mount Çika are nearby. The Thunderbolt Mountains, the western chain of the Ceraunian Mountains, enclose the area on its northern and northeastern side. The area opens up on its southwestern side with the mountain of Çika and descends towards the Ionian coast, with the Greek Islands of Othonas and Corfu in the distance.

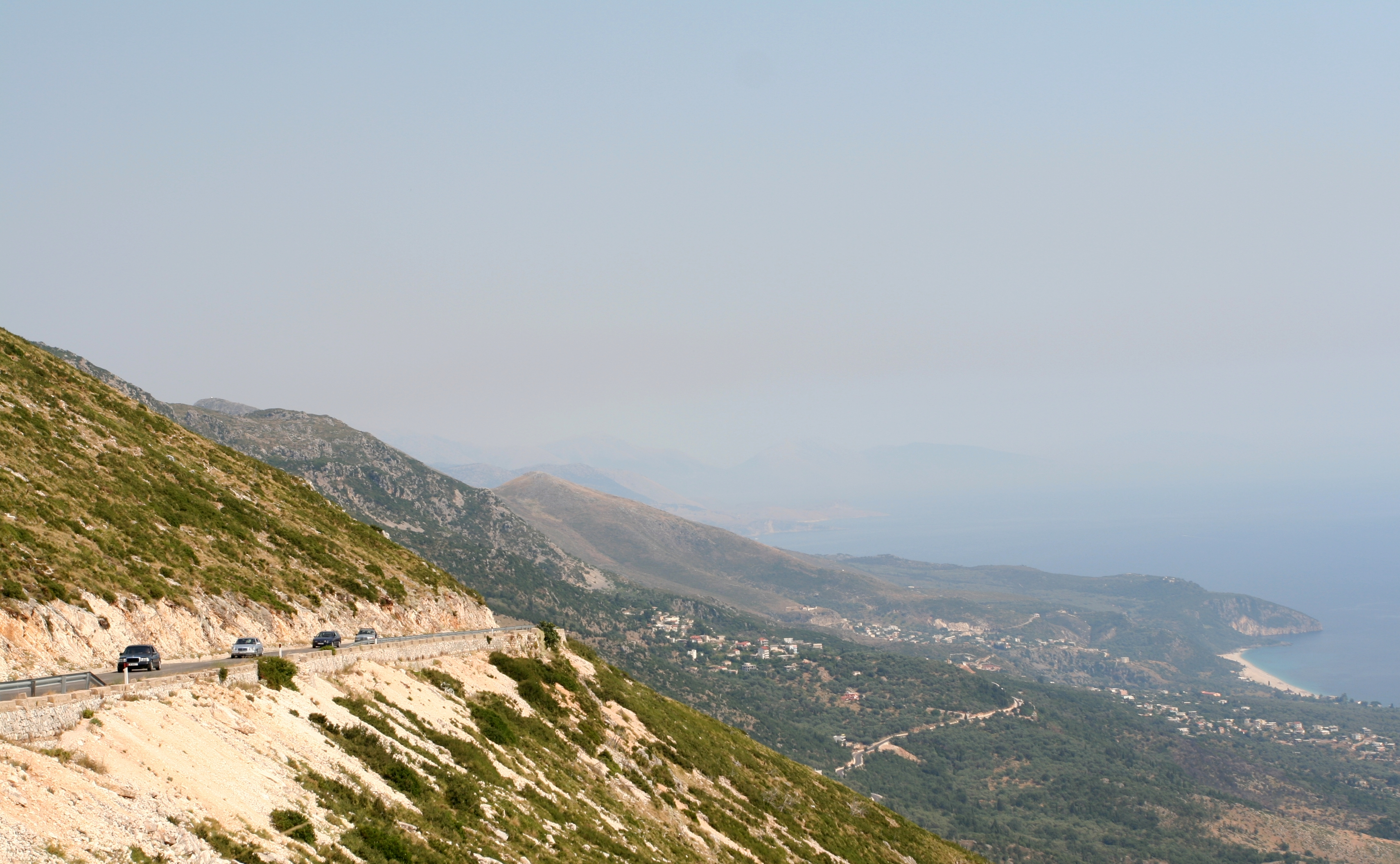
Coastline. The village can be seen to the left of the picture. Further to the right is Dhërmi

The village contains narrow stone roads and quaint white houses and is built around a 400-year-old platanus (plane tree), which is central to village life and the pride of the village. Geologically the terrain belongs to the western part of the Ionian Tectonic plate. This section of the coastline is referred to by geologists as the Palasë-Butrint coastline. Palasë's beach is 1.5 kilometres in length.

North of Palasë, is located a small bay, named Gramma ('letter' in Greek), accessible only by sea, with the surrounding cliffs containing various epigraphs, texts and symbols, perhaps carved out by sailors.

== Language ==
The inhabitants of Palasë are bilingual as they mainly speak a variant of the Himariote Greek dialect, and partly the Tosk Albanian. The local Greek idiom retains features of an older Greek linguistic substratum. Although Greek speakers, the locals are also fluent in Albanian. Bilingualism in Palasa often takes the form of compartmentalized or situational, bilingualism. In this form of bilingualism, different languages are used in different social contexts. In Palasa, Greek is used in the context of Greek Orthodox rituals, while Albanian is used in transmitting traditional, folk mythological rituals. Lexical borrowings from Albanian to Greek are found in the terminology which concerns village life. It indicates that the culture of the village was originally Albanian and reflects the function of the older language (Albanian) as prevailing in affairs of village life.

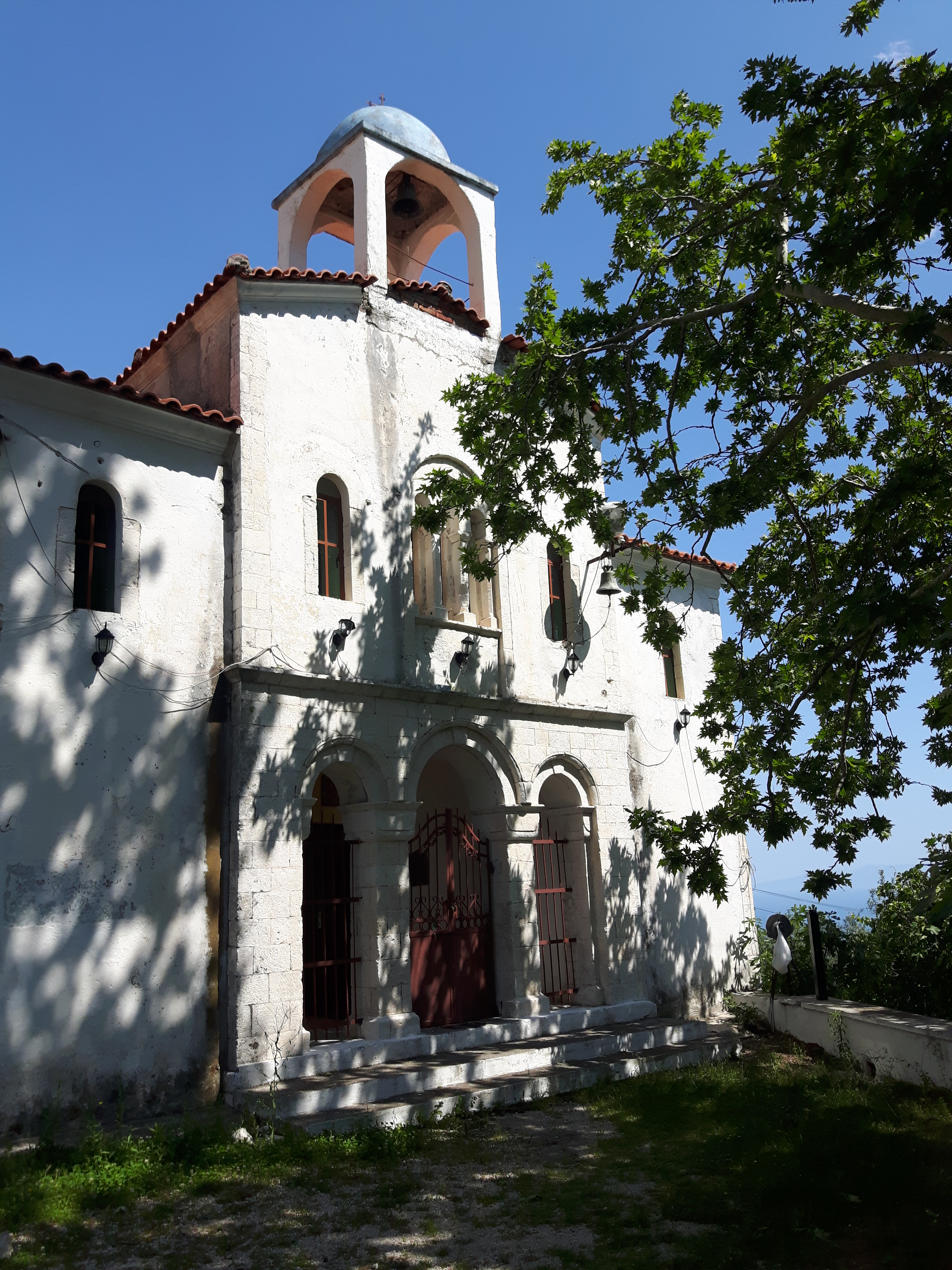
Saint Demetrius Church in Palasë

Toponyms of Greek origin are found more densely in the area of Palasë than in other areas of the southern Albanian coast. Some of them are of archaic origin and preserve unique features of the Greek language.

== Notable people ==
- Aleks Çaçi, writer and publicist
- Paskal Milo (born 1949), politician

== Movies ==
The 1987 film The Waxed Shirts (albanian: Këmishët me dyllë) was filmed in Palasë.

== See also ==
- Palaeste
- Ceraunian Mountains
- Caesar's Beach
- Chaonians
- Dhermi
- Greeks in Albania
- Himara
- Himariote Greek dialect
- Tourism in Albania

== Sources ==
- Bartl, Peter (1991). "Zur Topographie und Geschichte der Landschaft Himara in Südalbanien". Münchner Zeitschrift für Balkankunde (in German). 7–8. ISBN 9783878281962. ISSN 0170-8929.
- Hencken, Hugh (1968). Tarquinia, Villanovans, and Early Etruscans, Volume 1. Bulletin (American School of Prehistoric Research), American School of Prehistoric Research and Harvard University, Peabody Museum, American School of Prehistoric Research. Bulletin. Vol. 23. Peabody Museum.
- Jaupaj, Lavdosh (2019). Etudes des interactions culturelles en aire Illyro-épirote du VII au III siècle av. J.-C (Thesis). Université de Lyon; Instituti i Arkeologjisë (Albanie).
- Joseph, Brian; Novik, Alexander; Sobolev, Andrey; Spiro, Aristotle (2018). "Greek and Albanian in Palasa and Environs: A Report from the Field" (PDF). Proceedings of the 8th International Conference of Modern Greek Dialects and Linguistic Theory (MGDLT8) Gjirokastër, 4–6 October 2018.
- Kyriazis, Doris (2016). "Γλωσσικές επαφές και διαστρωματώσεις στην περιοχή Χιμάρας". Βορειοηπειρωτικά (in Greek). 5. Aristotle University of Thessaloniki.
- Borgia, Nilo (2014). "Kapitulli V: At Giuseppe Schirò-i". In Sinani, Shaban (ed.). Murgjit bazilianë të Italisë në Shqipëri: Shënime mbi misionet në Himarë, shek. XVI-XVIII (in Albanian). Translated by Hysa, Mimoza. Naimi. ISBN 978-9928-109-67-5.
- Likaj, Ethem (1990). "Die illyrische Herkunft des Albanischen im Lichte neuer Fakten und Interpretationen". Akten Des XIV. Internationalen Linguistenkongresses Berlin, 10. August-15. August 1987. Akademie-Verlag. ISBN 3050006579.
- Berktold, Percy; Wacker, Christian (1996). Akarnanien: eine Landschaft im antiken Griechenland. Ergon. ISBN 3928034715.
- Sobolev, N. A. (2017). "Languages in the Western Balkan Symbiotic Societies: Greek and Albanian in Himara, Albania" (PDF). Language and Literature. 14 (3). Vestnik SPbSU: 420–442. doi:10.21638/11701/spbu09.2017.310.
