= Palasa (disambiguation) =

Palasa may refer to:

- Palasa, a town in Andhra Pradesh, India
- Palasë, a village in Vlorë County, Albania
- Palasa 1978, a 2020 Indian Telugu-language film
