= Dukat, Albania =

Dukat
- Village
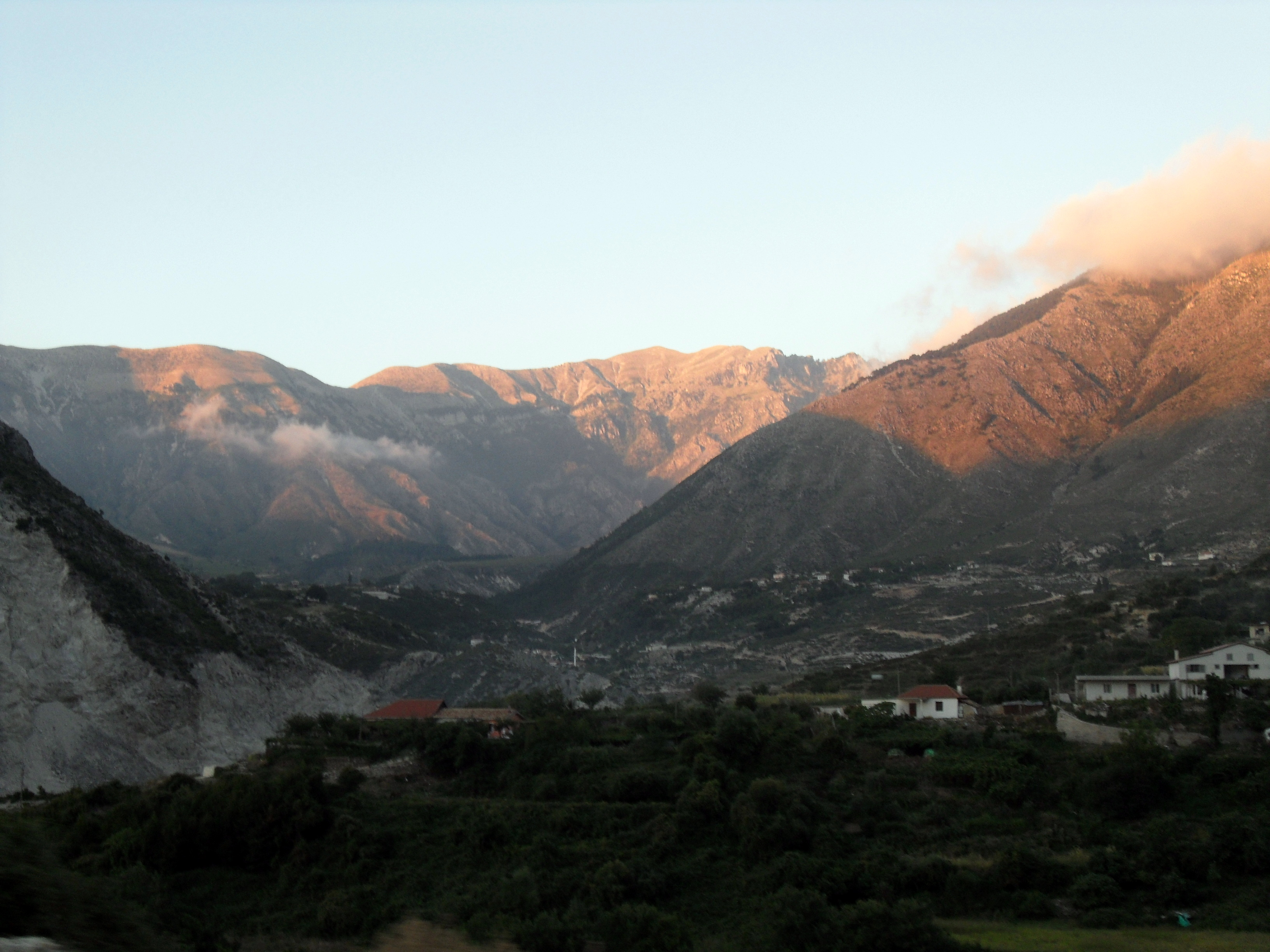

- Location within Albania
- Coordinates: 40°15′2″N 19°34′2″E
- Country: Albania
- County: Vlorë
- Municipality: Vlorë
- Administrative unit: Orikum
- Time zone: UTC+1 (CET)
  - Summer (DST): UTC+2 (CEST)

Dukat is a community in Vlorë County, southern Albania. With the 2015 local government reform, it became part of the municipality of Vlorë. The Dukat Plain covers an area of around 1,000–1,500 ha delimited by the Ceraunian Mountains and opened in the north towards the Bay of Vlorë on the Adriatic. Dukat traditionally belongs to the Albanian ethnographic region of Labëria.

== Name ==
Its name contains the Albanian suffix -at, widely used to form toponyms from personal names and surnames.

== Geography ==
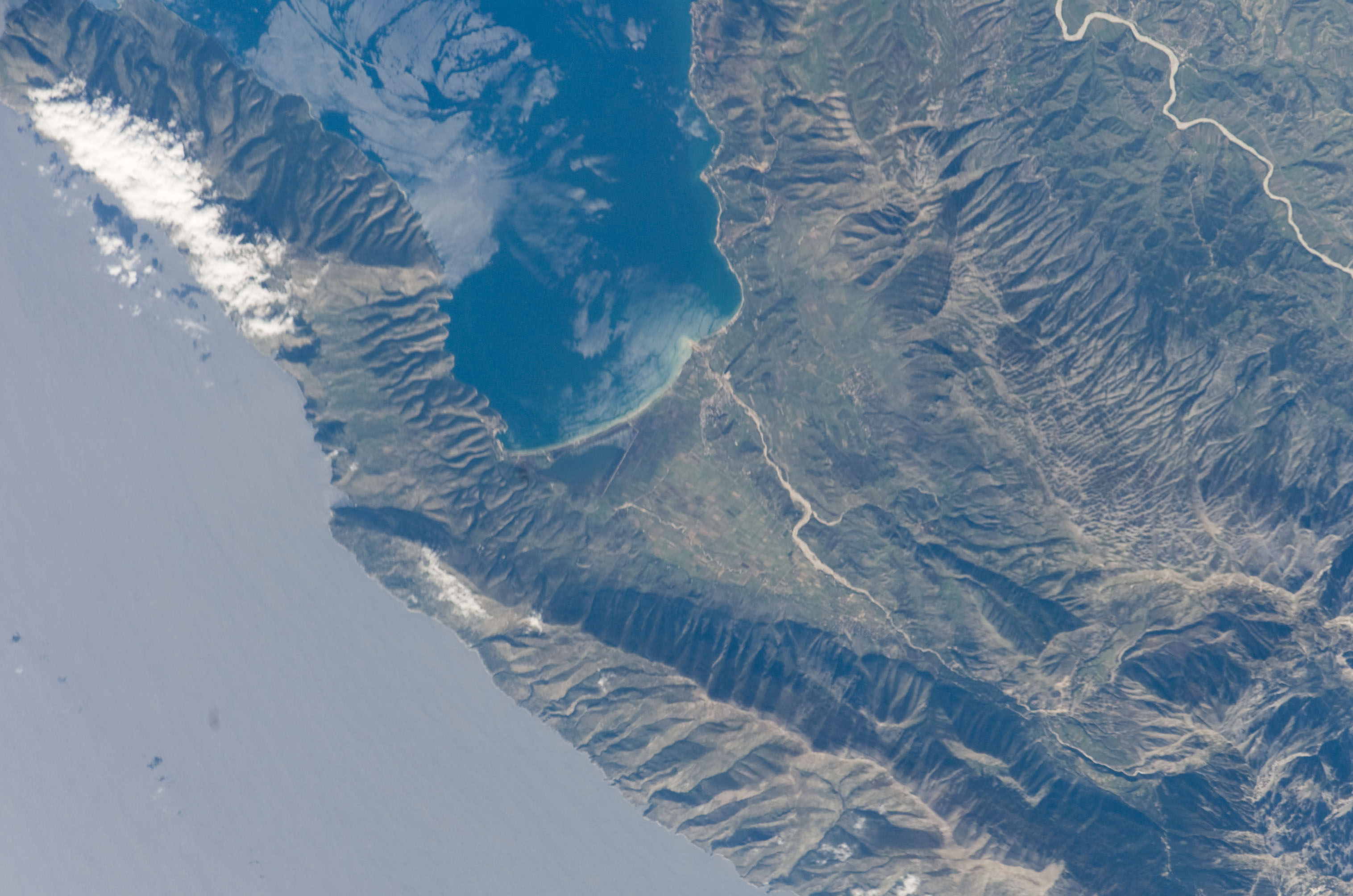
Dukat Plain

The Dukat plain is delimited by the Ceraunian Mountains, and it is opened in the north towards the Bay of Vlorë on the Adriatic Sea where the Dukat lagoon can be found. With a triangular shape, the plain covers an area of approximately 1,000–1,500 ha. The Dukat plain is irrigated by the Dukat river and numerous torrents which descend from the mountains, most prominently that of Llogara. The Llogara Pass at over 1,000 meters of altitude on the Ceraunian Mountains connects the Dukat plain with the Albanian Riviera of the Ionian Sea.

== History ==
Two Illyrian tumuli used in a period spanning from the Bronze Age to the Iron Age have been found in Dukat. The earlier graves offered a variety of Middle Helladic (2000-1550 BC) findings: Aegean type knives and Minyan ware probably of local manufacture. Naue II type swords, typical of 12th century Mycenaean Greek culture found through Albania and Greece were also unearthed. The architectural similarity with the tumulus of Torre Santa Sabina in Brindisi, Apulia, provides evidence of communication and interaction between the two shores of the Adriatic. Exchanges with the other side of the Adriatic and the Aegean World are found in the area. Around the 11th–10th centuries BC the first imports from southern Italy appear in the Dukat plain.

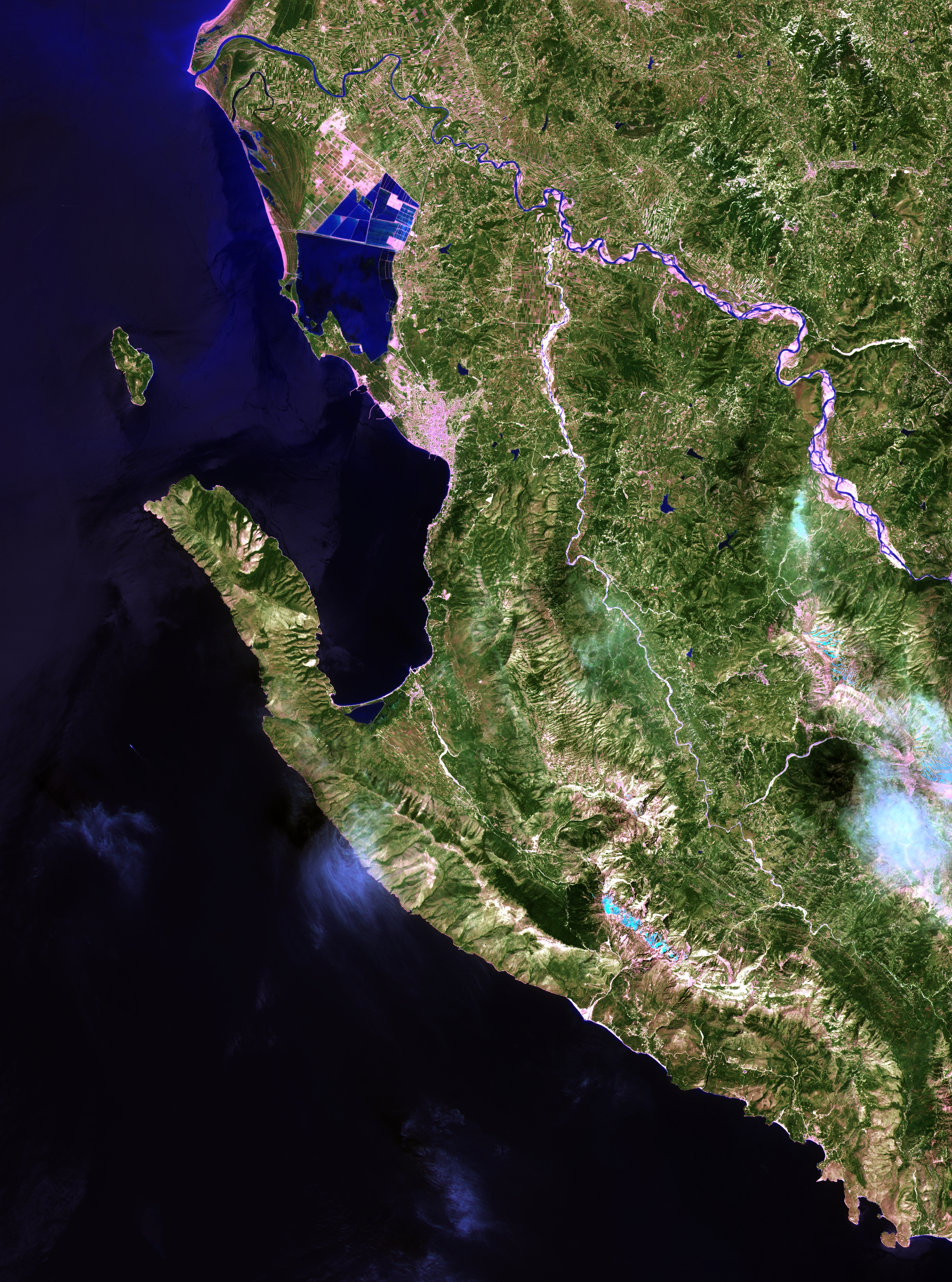

In classical antiquity, the foot of the Akrokeraunian Mountains (Karaburun Peninsula), where the Dukat plain is placed, was inhabited by the southernmost Illyrians. The Akrokeraunian mountains formed a natural separation between the Illyrians to the north and the Epirote Chaonians to the south. The Llogara Pass connected the regions of Illyria and Epirus, leading to ancient Palaeste south of the mountains, however this pass is difficult to cross.

The ancient Greek city of Oricum was located in the coastal area of the Dukat plain, in southern Illyria. The plain of Dukat formed part of the city's territory in antiquity. A Hellenistic-era brick grave unearthed in Dukat i Ri shows a building technique that is identical to the brick graves of Oricum and reveals that the same burial traditions were practiced. This type of Hellenistic graves were also widely found in Apollonia and Amantia in southern Illyria, as well as in parts of Chaonia (Phoenice). Brick-structured graves appeared for the first time around the second half of the 4th century BC in the Greek polis of Apollonia and started to spread substantially in the area of Oricum and Amantia around the second half of the 3rd century BC. The grave of Dukat i Ri probably traces back to this period. Together with the Hellenistic necropolises found in the hinterland of Oricum, they show that there was a significant number of rural settlements in the territory that surrounded the ancient city. The tradition and the techniques used to build the graves indicate that the rural population had equal needs as the urban population. As shown by the building techniques of these Hellenistic graves, Oricum developed a local tradition in burial architecture.

Sometime between the 10th and the 13th century the Church of Marmiroi was built near the village.

Dukat lied outside the Himara region, nonetheless it collaborated with Himariots in earlier anti-Ottoman initiatives. According to a 1566 document the Dukat village had 1,800 households, however only 200 potential anti-Ottoman fighters lived there, maybe because many inhabitants had converted to Islam. Dukat participated in the Anti-Ottoman revolt of 1571 and joined Himarë in organizing an uprising in 1581.

In July 1811 the Ottoman Albanian ruler Ali Pasha persuaded the region of Dukat to side with him.

Dervish Ali a native of the area known as one of the organizers of the revolt of 1847 built his towers near the village which were used by Albanian rebels during the uprising for hiding and storage and are today cultural monuments.

During the Vlora war forces from Dukat participated in the Albanian side, this included the commanders of Sheme Sadiku and Hodo Zeqiri and freed the village from Italian occupation.

During World War II Dukat was part of the battlefield of the battle of Gjorm, where Albanian resistance units defeated and routed the troops of the Kingdom of Italy.

== Culture ==
The musical style performed in Dukat belongs to the Lab musical dialect of the Albanian iso-polyphony. In the second half of the 20th century, its style took a unique identity, producing a novel way of singing in Lab music. The Dukat style gained high popularity during the 1960s and 1970s, and it was maybe the most widely performed Lab musical style in those years.

Dukat is home to the Church of Marmiroi, a medieval church and Dervish Ali's Towers.

== Demographics ==
Dukat is inhabited by both Christian and Muslim Albanians. The inhabitance of Dukat speak the Lab dialect of the Albanian language which is a sub-dialect of the Tosk Albanian dialect.
