= Radhimë =

Village in Albania

- Village
- Location in Albania
- Coordinates: 40.3247°N 19.274°E
- Country: Albania
- County: Vlorë County
- Municipality: Orikum

Area
  - Total: 20 km^{2} (7.7 sq mi)
- Elevation: 165 m (541 ft)
- Website: www.radhima.eu

Radhimë (also spelled Radhima) is a village in the municipality of Orikum, Vlorë County, in southern Albania. It is located on the western slopes of the Llogara Mountain, south of the city of Vlorë, and is known for agricultural production, especially citrus fruits, olives, and viticulture, as well as coastal tourism.

== History ==
Archaeological finds in the area date back to the 3rd–2nd centuries BCE. The first recorded archaeological discovery occurred during World War I, when construction works in the Mavro Nero area uncovered large ceramic blocks, believed to have formed part of an ancient wall. These finds are housed in the Archaeological Museum of Vlorë and the National Museum in Tirana.

The earliest known appearance of the name "Radhimë" on a map dates to 1118. Following the death of Skanderbeg, the village is believed to have been a point of departure for Albanian migrants to southern Italy. Local place names and family names still reflect this historical link. Slavic toponyms such as Sello and Dremicë also appear in the area, dating from later periods. Until the Ottoman period, the village population was predominantly Catholic and Orthodox.

During Albania's independence movement and World War II, local residents contributed to national efforts.

In 1956, a collective agricultural cooperative was formed, later merging with those in Tragjas and Dukat. Between 1968 and 1970, hillside terracing and deforestation occurred between Jonufër and Nisi, followed by the establishment of the "Rinia" agricultural enterprise. Vineyards replaced large areas of oak forest, and new settlers, particularly from the Mesaplik area, moved into the village. By 1975, Radhimë had about 80 households, subsequent decades saw expansion of residential areas.

== Geography ==
Radhimë lies on the coastal plain and hills along the Ionian Sea, with an elevation between 150 and 180 metres above sea level. The traditional territory covers about 20 km² (2,000 hectares), with a maximum north–south length of 7.5 km and east–west width of 4.5 km. The coastline extends for approximately 7.45 km, from Ura e Vrizit to the mouth of the Izvor River. Historically, the area was considered part of Labëria, under the administration of the Kanina Vilayet and later the Sanjak of Vlorë.

== Climate ==
The village has a Mediterranean climate, with mild winters and sunny, relatively cool summers.
