= Caesar's Beach =

Beach in Albania

Caesar's Beach (Albanian: Plazhi i Çezarit) is a beach in Palasë, Albania, with a coastal resort and residences. The beach is named for Julius Caesar's landing near Palaeste in what is now southern Albania during his invasion of Macedonia during the civil war in 48 BC. It is well known for its proximity with different attraction sites including UNESCO Heritage Sites such as the National Park of Llogora and Butrint, the canyon of Gjipe, Blue Eye Spring, and Pirates cave or Borsh Spring. Palasë is also known as "Caesar’s Path", defined similarly in Lucan's epic poem Pharsalia.
