= Oricum =

Ancient city and archaeological site in Albania

- Ὤρικος, Ὤρικον; Oriku, Orikumi
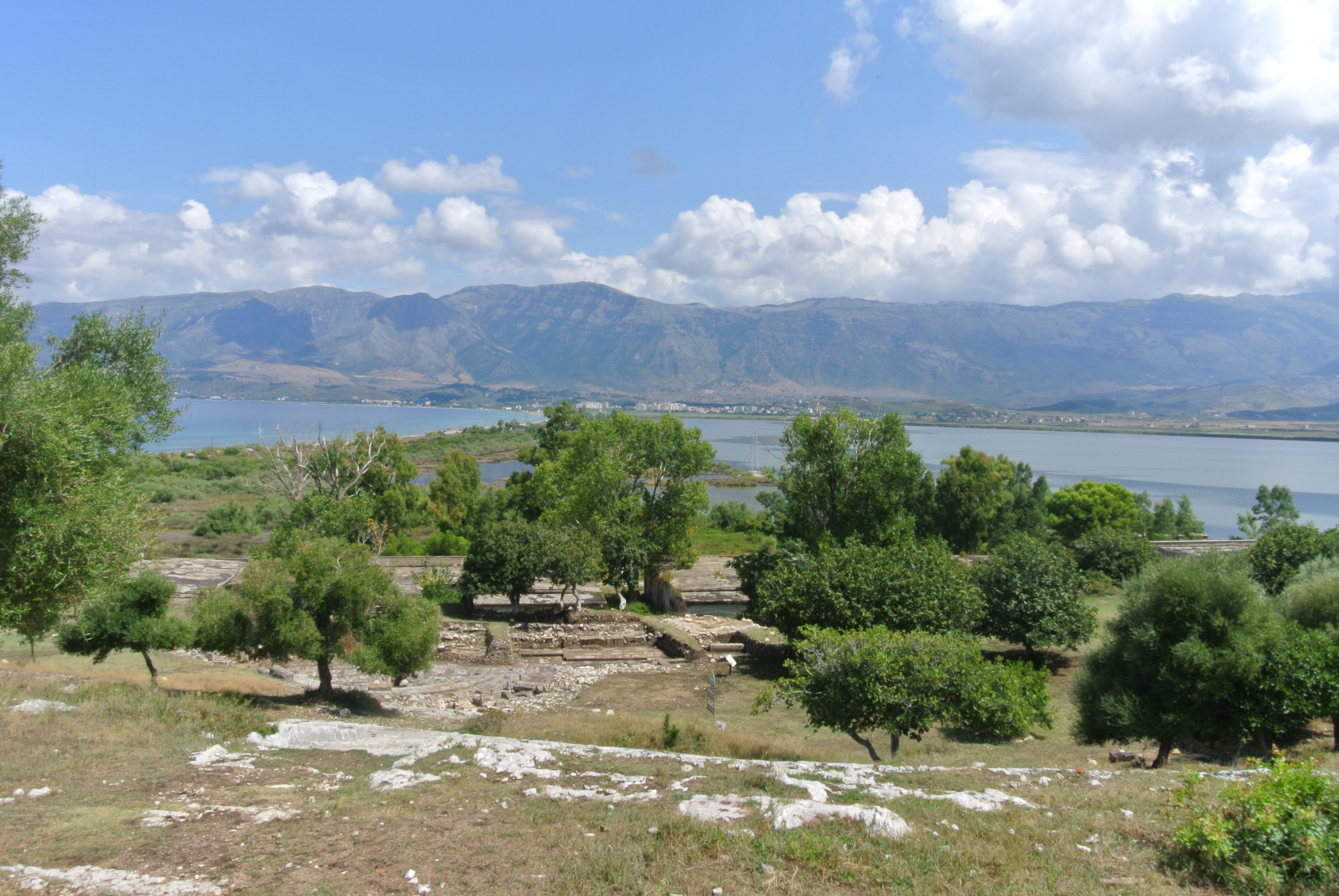
- The site of ancient Orikos

- Location in Albania
- 40°19′8″N 19°25′43″E
- Type: harbor, settlement
- Periods: Classical; Hellenistic; Roman
- Cultures: Greek; Roman
- Location: Orikum, Vlorë County, Albania
- Region: Epirus or Illyria

Site notes
- Owner: Government of Albania

Cultural Monument of Albania

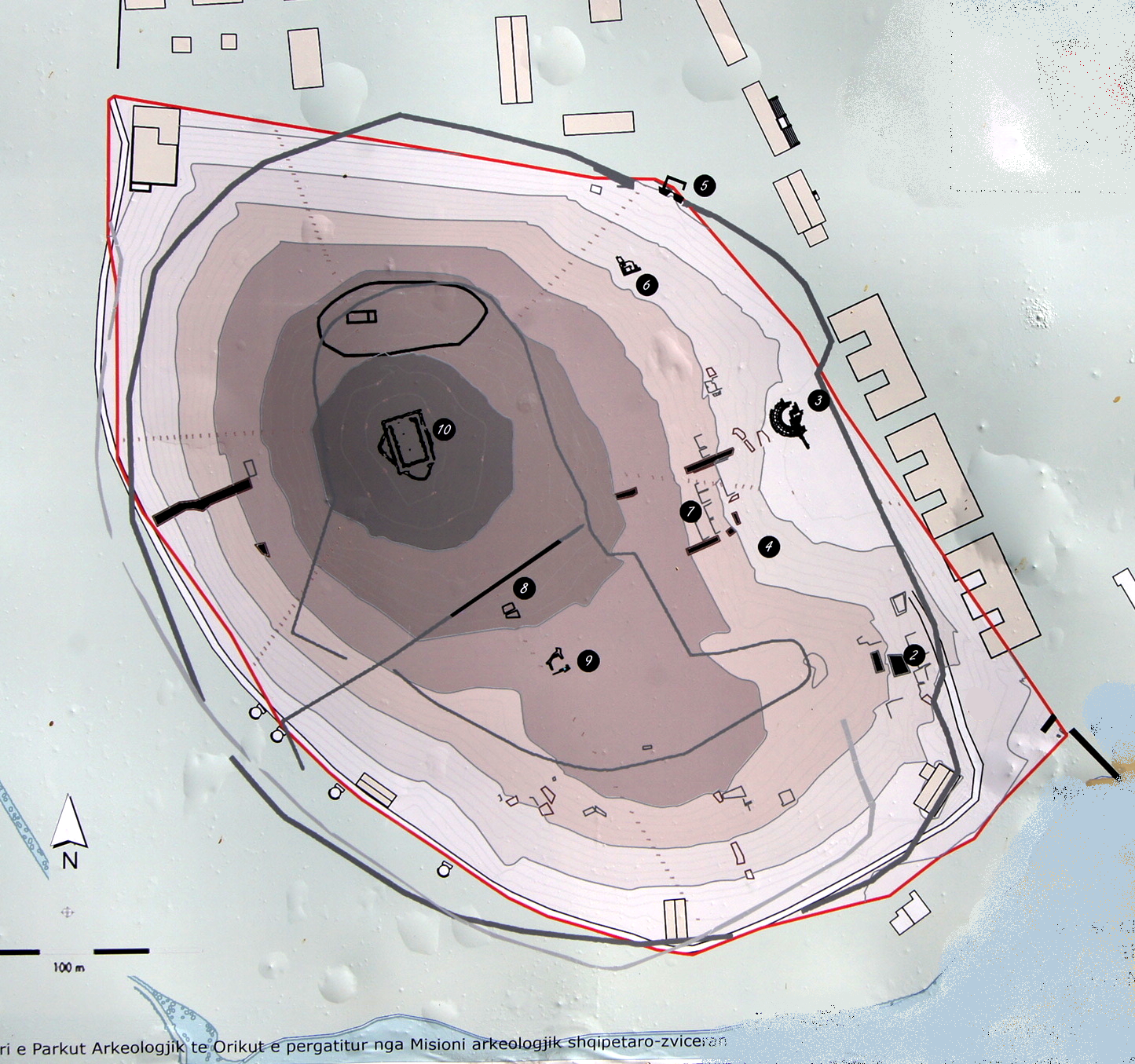
Oricum plan

Oricum (Ancient Greek: Ὤρικον, Ὤρικος or Ὠρικός; Latin: Oricum or Oricus; Albanian: Oriku or Orikum) was a harbor on the Illyrian coast that developed in an Ancient Greek polis at the south end of the Bay of Vlorë on the southern Adriatic coast. It was located at the foot of the Akrokeraunian Mountains, the natural border between ancient Epirus and Illyria. Oricum later became an important Roman city between the provinces of Epirus Vetus and Epirus Nova in Macedonia. It is now an archaeological park of Albania, near modern Orikum, Vlorë County. Oricum holds such a strategic geographical position that the area has been in continuous usage as a naval base from antiquity to the present-days.

It appears that the site of Oricum was uninhabited before the 6th century BC. In the early period contacts between the Greeks and the local Illyrians were evidently absent in the hinterland of the site. Early Greek sources describe Orikos as a harbor (Greek: λιμήν, limen). Findings from the proto-urban period in Orikos provide evidence of extensive contacts primarily with the Greek world. Like other ports of southern Illyria, the site of Orikos was a place of exchange of products and a meeting point between the outside world and the Illyrians located in the hinterland. In the Classical period Orikos was likely part of the peraia of Korkyra.

The polis of Orikos was founded as a southern Greek colony rather than an indigenous foundation. The settlement developed towards mid-5th century BC, and it was built on a Greek model. It is firstly identified as a Greek polis within the territory of Illyrian Amantia in the Periplus of Pseudo-Scylax (mid-4th century BC). At the beginning of the Hellenistic period Oricum appears to have already acquired the status of polis with its own territory. Pyrrhus gained control of Oricum, incorporating it into the State of Epirus during his rule (early 3rd century BC). After the Roman victory against the Illyrians, in 228 BC Oricum became part of the Roman protectorate in Illyricum. During the Macedonian Wars Oricum was involved in the conflicts between Rome and Macedon in the Illyrian territory that Rome had aimed to protect and control periodically for thirty years, since the First Illyrian War.

Oricum experienced a phase of great prosperity in the period between the late 3rd and the early 1st centuries BC, much like other cities in northern Epirus at the time. In the Roman period Oricum was one of the principal harbors of the new province of Epirus Nova, in the province of Macedonia. During the conflicts of the Great Roman Civil War between Caesar and Pompey in Illyria, Oricum was one of the ports of the Illyrian coast that obeyed to Pompey. However it became the first one taken by Caesar, who used it as an important naval base in his military operations. The inhabitants of the city were described as Graeci ("Greeks") by Caesar. The city experienced a decline during the Roman imperial era, when the nearby port of Aulon (modern Vlorë) appears to have gained more prominence.

== Location ==
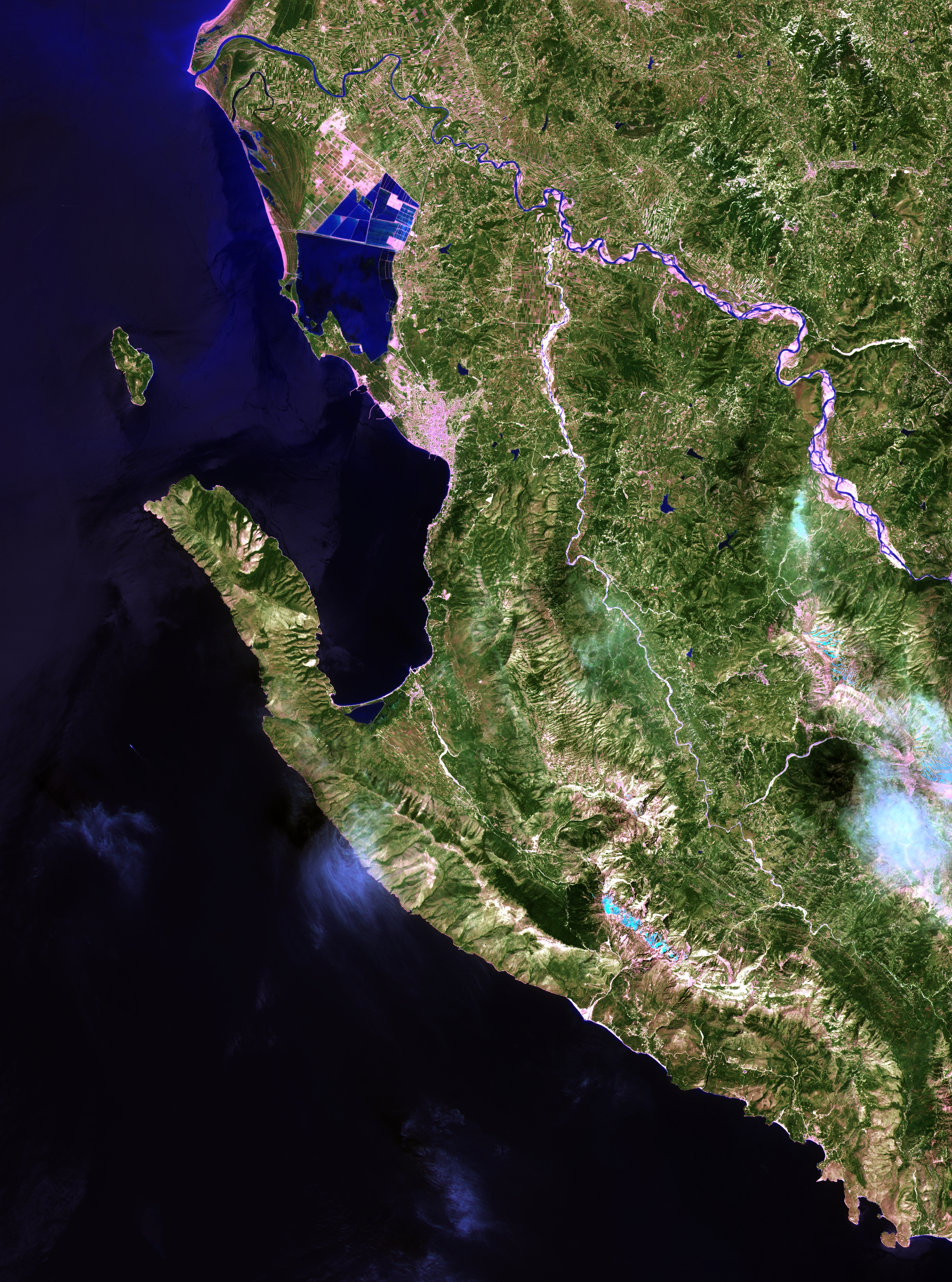

Oricum, placed at the end of the Karaburun Peninsula (ancient Akrokeraunia), constitutes the eastern point of the narrowest stretch of the sea – the Strait of Otranto – which connects the Iapygian promontory in southeastern Italy with Albania. From pre-colonial times until the Hellenistic period the Strait of Otranto was the main east-west sea route, which, with a distance of around 72 km, required about twelve hours of navigation with very favorable wind. In Roman times, a shift to the north took place, using the Brundisium-Dyrrachium route, which was considered safer, although being longer.

The Akrokeraunian Mountains have served as a navigation landmark for the ships. From Italy the navigators could have turned left towards Illyria or right towards Epirus and beyond towards the Aegean Sea; from the south they could have continued straight towards Illyria, or turned left towards Italy; from the north, they could have continued straight towards Epirus and beyond the Aegean, or turned right towards Italy. The usage as navigation landmark instead of stopping points of the Akrokeraunian Mountains is due to the fact that, except for a few small bays, its topography does not feature large harbors. The closest ports are those of Oricum, Aulona and Triport to the north, and Panormos to the south. But in classical antiquity these port towns have always been overshadowed by the more prominent port of Apollonia. Admitting that Triport corresponds to Thronion, which was conquered by Apollonia around mid-5th century BC, Apollonia's territory was close to Orikos, which would explain Orikos' probable imitation of an Apollonian coin type, intended to facilitate trade.

The harbor at Orikos ensured the link to the northern routes, while the routes to Korkyra and to the southeastern destinations, such as the Ambracian Gulf, were granted by Panormos, a harbor located in the middle of the Ceraunian Mountains. Orikos is located on the large valley of Dukat, at the foot of the Karaburun Peninsula and on the road leading to the Llogara Pass. This mountain pass connects the valley of Dukat in Illyria with the ancient Palaeste in Epirus to the south of the Karaburun Peninsula in open sea. However the Llogara Pass is difficult to cross, as highlighted also by Caesar in the De Bello Civili describing his military operations in the area during the Great Roman Civil War in winter 48 BC. Oricum was not a very favorable harbor, because it was located far from the main sea and land routes. The city based its economy on the natural resources of the Acroceraunians: timber for ships and limestone from the quarries of the peninsula. The solid limestone was cut into large square blocks by digging channels on three sides. From the archaic period until Roman imperial times the limestone was transported to Apollonia and Dyrrhachium

Orikos is firstly mentioned in ancient sources by Hecataeus of Miletus and Herodotus (fl. 6th century BC), where it is identified as a λιμήν (limen harbor in Greek) in his description of the coast of Epirus. Hecataeus also states that Oricum is located on the northern edge of the Acroceraunian which marks the border of Epirus. In the Periplus of Pseudo-Scylax (4th century BC) Orikos is identified for the first time as a Greek polis ('Ελληνίς πόλις) located within the territory of Amantia, the latter being regarded as an Illyrian city. According to Pseudo-Scylax Oricum marked the end of Illyria and the beginning of Chaonia and Epirus a fact already known from the 6th century B.C by Hecataeus. Also according to Pseudo-Scymnus in the 2nd century BC the end of the Illyrian land was around Oricum in the Bay of Vlorë. Pseudo-Scymnus as well as Lucian attribute to Oricum a Greek foundation. Ptolemy locates Oricum in Chaonia. Similarly Flavius Philostratus in the 2nd century AD states that Oricum was located in Epirus.

Placed on the foot of the Ceraunian Mountains, in a broader context Oricum is located in a border zone between the Epirotes, more specifically the Chaones located south of the Acroceraunians mountains, and the Illyrians whose southernmost territory is located at the foot of this mountain. Being on that geographic border caused misunderstandings among ancient authors about Oricum's location in Illyria or Epirus. From a geographical perspective, the territory of Epirus hardly goes beyond the Ceraunian Mountains, which represent a natural border that is difficult to cross. Available data indicate that Orikos became part of state of Epirus only during the Kingdom of Pyrrhus of Epirus (early 3rd century BC).

The territory of Orikos is delimited by high mountains on its western, southern and eastern sides: Maja e Çikës in the southeast; the Lungara massif in the east that stretches north towards Kaninë and Drashovicë near Vlorë; Rrëza e Kanalit and the Karaburun peninsula in the southwest. Those mountains form the triangular shape of the Dukat plain. The region is opened in the north towards the Bay of Vlorë on the Adriatic Sea. The site of Oricum forms an island that is separated from the edge of the Bay of Vlorë by a lagoon, which was sufficiently deep to have allowed the sheltering of Caesar's ships during his arrival in the port. Two channels placed on the sides of the island connect the lagoon with the Bay. The Acroceraunian Mountains protect the area from the winds that come from the south and from the west. Oricum has a very fertile hinterland. The mountains surrounding the Dukat valley continuously supply it with water, and a very thick forest covers the Llogara pass. There was a significant number of rural settlements in the hinteland of the ancient city.

Strabo mentions that Oricum owned a seaport, Panormos. In another passage he mentions Panormos as a large harbor at the centre of the Ceraunian Mountains, which has tentatively been identified with present-day Porto Palermo on the Ionian coast. The area of Oricum is separated from the Ionian coast by the Ceraunian Mountains, and connected to it only by the difficult Llogara Pass at over 1000 meters of altitude. Rather than conjecturing a phase in which Oricum might have extended its area of regional influence as far as Porto Palermo wresting it from the Chaonians and the city of Chimara, it is much more likely that Strabo uses the term Panormos (lit. "safe landing place") to define, in two different passages two distinct ports: one of the harbors of the Bay of Vlorë placed along the south-eastern coast of the Acroceraunian/Karaburun promontory that directly pertained to Oricum, and Porto Palermo on the Ionian coast.

Orikos was originally on an island, but already in ancient times it became connected to the mainland; it covered an area of 5 hectares (12 acres), but archaeological remains are scarce. The establishment of trading posts on small offshore islands was a common practice by Eretrian colonists from Euboia. Eretrian presence in Oricum would indicate that at that time the Corinthians were not interested in the Illyrian mainland.

== History ==
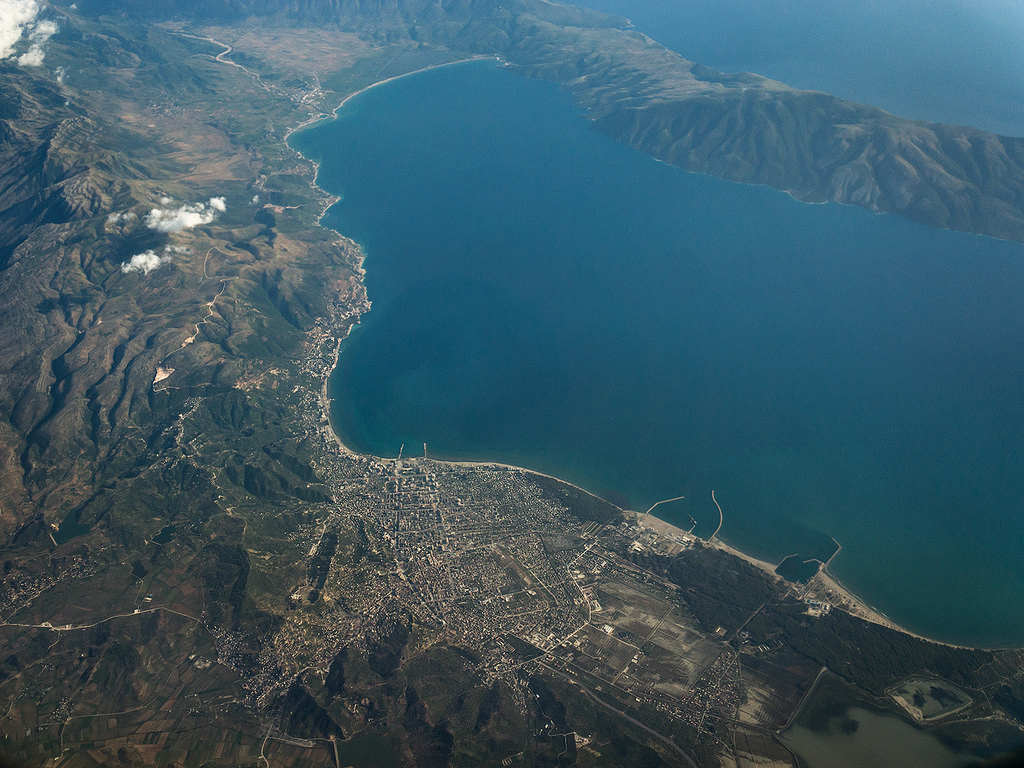

=== Pre-foundation period ===
The earliest traces of human life in the area of Oricum (rock shelter at Rrëza e Kanalit) belong to the Late Paleolithic and Mesolithic.

Two Illyrian tumuli used in a period spanning from the Bronze Age to the Iron Age have been found in Dukat, in the hinterland of Oricum. Exchanges with the other side of the Adriatic and the Aegean World are found in the area. The architectural similarity with the tumulus of Torre Santa Sabina in Brindisi, Apulia, provides evidence of communication and interaction between the two shores of the Adriatic. The earlier graves offered a variety of Middle Helladic findings, Aegean type knives and Minyan ware probably of local manufacture. Naue II type swords, typical of 12th century Mycenaean Greek culture found through Albania and Greece were also unearthed. Around the 11th–10th centuries BC the first imports from southern Italy appear in the Dukat plain.

In the early historical period the findings from the hinterland of Oricum reveal no contacts between the Greeks and the local Illyrian population. Despite the absence of archaeological evidence, Euboeans and Phoenicians might have established trade routes along the eastern shores of the Adriatic (including the site of Oricum) following the same networks that had been traversed previously during the Mycenaean period.

=== Archaic period ===
It is not known whether Orikos was originally a Euboean colony on the Illyrian coast as reported in ancient literature. As a Euboean foundation it would date back to about the mid 8th century BC, probably established as an Eretrian emporium, or as a harbor by Eretrian refugees from Kerkyra after this island was conquered by the Corinthians, although the latter hypothesis is less likely. Archaeological evidence has shown that the site of Oricum was not inhabited before the 6th century BC, however the lack of artifactual confirmation does not necessary mean that the Euboean seafarers did not reach these parts at an earlier era. The site appears to possess all the characteristics of places that were typically chosen by Greek expedition movements of the 8th–6th century BC to establish new settlements.

Little is known about the exact status of the port and the origins of the city's urbanisation. Orikos, like Epidamnos, could have served as a stopover for merchant ships coming from Corinth and heading towards the Po delta and the port of Spina, where many Corinthian vases from the 6th century BC are found. Findings from the proto-urban period provide evidence of extensive contacts primarily with the Greek world. As in the ports of Apollonia and Dyrrachion, Korkyrean merchants certainly conducted trade activities in the port of Orikos, as evidenced by the presence of Korkyrean coins from the 5th–4th centuries BC. The ports of southern Illyria were places of exchange of products and a meeting point between the outside world and the Illyrians located in the hinterland of the coastal cities. The settlement developed towards the middle of the 5th century BC, and it was built on a Greek model.

The first account that described it as a Greek polis was provided around the mid-4th century BC by Pseudo-Skylax.

=== Classical period ===
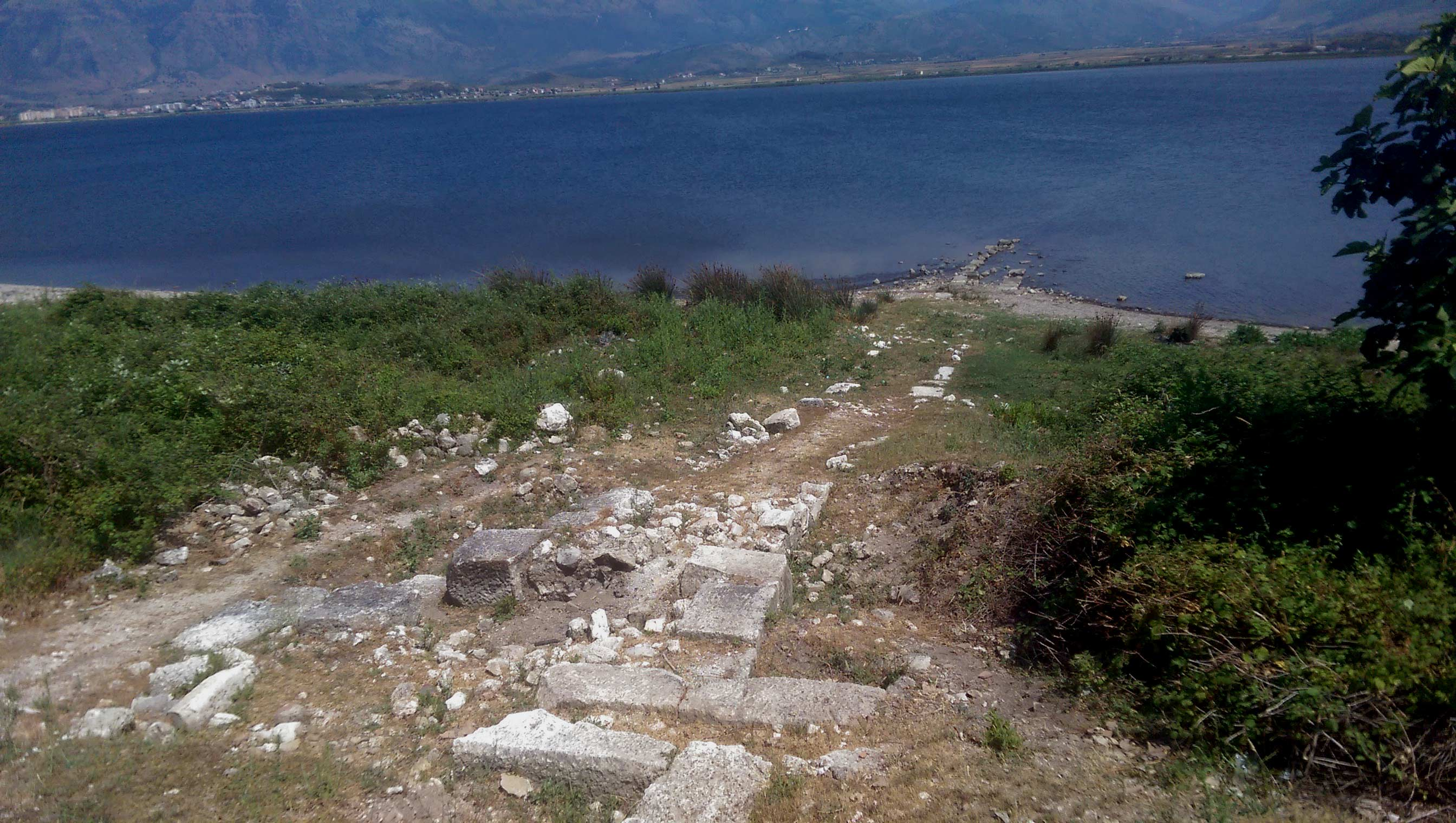
City Walls

In the Classical period Orikos was likely part of the peraia of Korkyra, which was mentioned by Thucydides. A 5th century BC oracular tablet in Dodona written in the Corinthian alphabet contains the inquity of a citizen of Orikos. The inscription mentions the chôra of Orikos.

Based on inquiries from Oricum to Dodona it has been suggested that in Oricum some dialectal variations of the local northwest Greek dialect might have existed as in the rest of northern Epirus.

In c. 450 BC the nearby polis of Apollonia was expanded towards the south after the victory it achieved against Thronium in the Bay of Aulon. This may indicate Apollonia's incursion into the region of Chaonia as well as the annexation of barbarian territory on the left bank of the Aous, as far south as Oricum.

=== Hellenistic period ===
From epigraphic material it can be inferred that at the beginning of the Hellenistic period Oricum had already acquired the status of polis with its own territory. A tablet dating to the third quarter of the 4th century BC reports that Orikos and Kerkyra have made an alliance (sympoliteia). During his rule (early 3rd century BC) Pyrrhus of Epirus gained control of Oricum.

No fortifications are found in the city and its territory most probably because Oricum was surrounded by mountains and due to the friendly relation towards its neighbors: the Chaonians, Apollonia and the Amantes.

Hellenistic brick-structured graves were largely found in Apollonia, Amantia and Oricum in southern Illyria, as well as in parts of Chaonia, specifically in Phoenice. These types of graves appeared for the first time in Apollonia around the second half of the 4th century BC, and began to spread widely in the areas of Amantia and Oricum around the second half of the 3rd century BC. In the hinterland of Oricum another type of grave appeared, brick-structured graves with false archways. The building characteristics of the graves indicate that Oricum had developed a local tradition in burial architecture.

Oricum became among the largest cities in northern Epirus that prospered during the last two centuries of the Hellenistic era compared to those of the coast of southern Epirus that witnessed depressed economies. The city ethnonym of Orikos is attested in a 3rd century BC Korkyrian decree and a 3rd century BC oracle inquiry from Orikos as well as on coins of the city dating to the 3rd-2nd centuries BC.

=== Roman period ===
The city seems to have been completely independent in the period 230–215 BC. After the Roman victory in the First Illyrian War, Illyrian Queen Teuta was forced to retreat to the Bay of Kotor, and in 228 BC the Romans imposed a protectorate on the islands of Issa and Corcyra, as well as on the cities of Epidamnos, Apollonia and Oricum. The protectorate area corresponded to the usage of the Roman concept of Illyricum. It had military importance under Roman rule, being among the Greek towns in Illyria serving as a base during Rome's wars with the Illyrians and with Macedonia (which occupied it for a time). In 214 Philip V of Macedonia raided the Illyrian coast with 120 lembs, briefly taking Oricum and besieging Apollonia. Oricum asked Rome protection against Philip, and the city was quickly recovered by Roman propraetor of the fleet Marcus Valerius Laevinus. Laevinus crossed the sea to Illyria, intervening immediately because in Philip V's hands, Oricum and Apollonia would have been good naval bases for a Macedonian attack upon Italy. After Philip V's defeat against the Romans, the Illyrian territory was divided into two parts: the independent kingdom of Pleuratus which comprised the northern territory of the Ardiaei with Scodra and Lissus, Dassaretia with Pelion, Lychnidus; and the Roman protectorate which comprised the territories of the ports of Orikos, Apollonia and Dyrrhachium.

During the civil war between Caesar and Pompey in Illyria, Lissus, Dyrrhachium, Apollonia and Orikos obeyed Pompey. Pompey's mastery of the ports of the Illyrian coast forced Caesar to land at Palaeste, south of the Acroceraunian mountains. Oricum was the first city taken by Julius Caesar after his arrival on the Acroceraunia, and he provides a vivid description of its surrender in Book 3 of his De Bello Civili:

But as soon as Caesar had landed his troops, he set off the same day for Oricum: when he arrived there, Lucius Torquatus, who was governor of the town by Pompey's appointment, and had a garrison of Parthinians in it, endeavored to shut the gates and defend the town, and ordered the Greeks to man the walls, and to take arms. But as they refused to fight against the power of the Roman people, and as the citizens made a spontaneous attempt to admit Caesar, despairing of any assistance, he threw open the gates, and surrendered himself and the town to Caesar, and was preserved safe from injury by him. (III:12)

Caesar also calls the inhabitants of Oricum "Graeci", no doubt due to the fact that they spoke Greek.

Orician terebinth ("Oricia terebintho") is mentioned by Virgil and Sextus Propertius.

Later Oricum "became more of a civilian settlement, and the few remains which can be seen today date from the 1st century BC or later. 2nd century senator Herodes Atticus built a theater at Oricum however it was later destroyed by an earthquake. Herodes stayed there for a time period probably as part of his exile. The city experienced a decline during the Roman imperial era. In that period the nearby port of Aulona appears to have gained more prominence. The restoration of the city by Herodes Atticus and the omission of the name of the city in the Tabula Peutingeriana, unlike that of Aulona which is recorded, provide evidence of its decline.

In the 11th–12th centuries, Oricum, now known as Jericho (Greek: Ἱεριχὼ), formed a Byzantine province along with Kanina and Aulon. As the Provincia Jericho et Caninon, it appears in the imperial chrysobull granted to Venice in 1198 by Alexios III Angelos.

=== Ottoman period ===
During the Ottoman Empire the harbor of Oricum was renamed Pashaliman, 'the Pasha's harbour', and the lagoon still bears this name, as does the nearby Albanian navy base.

== Mythology ==
The periegesis of Pseudo-Scymnus (c. 100 BC) reported the tradition according to which the city was founded by Euboeans on the Illyrian coast, blown off their route on their return home from Troy by strong winds.

It remains uncertain whether the myth of the foundation reported in the periegesis is to be considered as historically relevant or whether it is merely an attempt to attribute a glorious Homeric past to the city aiming to justify a Greek presence on the Illyrian coast. The first hypothesis can be supported by some other elements in literary traditions, seeming to witness to a Euboean presence in the area of Orikos dating back to the 8th century BC, but on the other hand the archaeological material found so far in the region does not precede the 6th century BC.

Various other events described in Greek mythology are associated to Oricum; Geryon was said to have pastured his cattle in the area around Oricum, while Helenus stopped at Oricum.

== Religion ==
3rd century B.C. author Apollonius of Rhodes mentions in his work Argonautica that a sanctuary of Apollon Nomios was located at Oricum which included altars of the Nymphs and the Moirai founded by Medea. Aphrodite and Eros were also worshiped.

== Coinage ==
From around 230 to 168 BC the city issued its own coins with the Greek legend ΩΡΙΚΙΩΝ ('of the Oricians').

== Archaeological remains ==
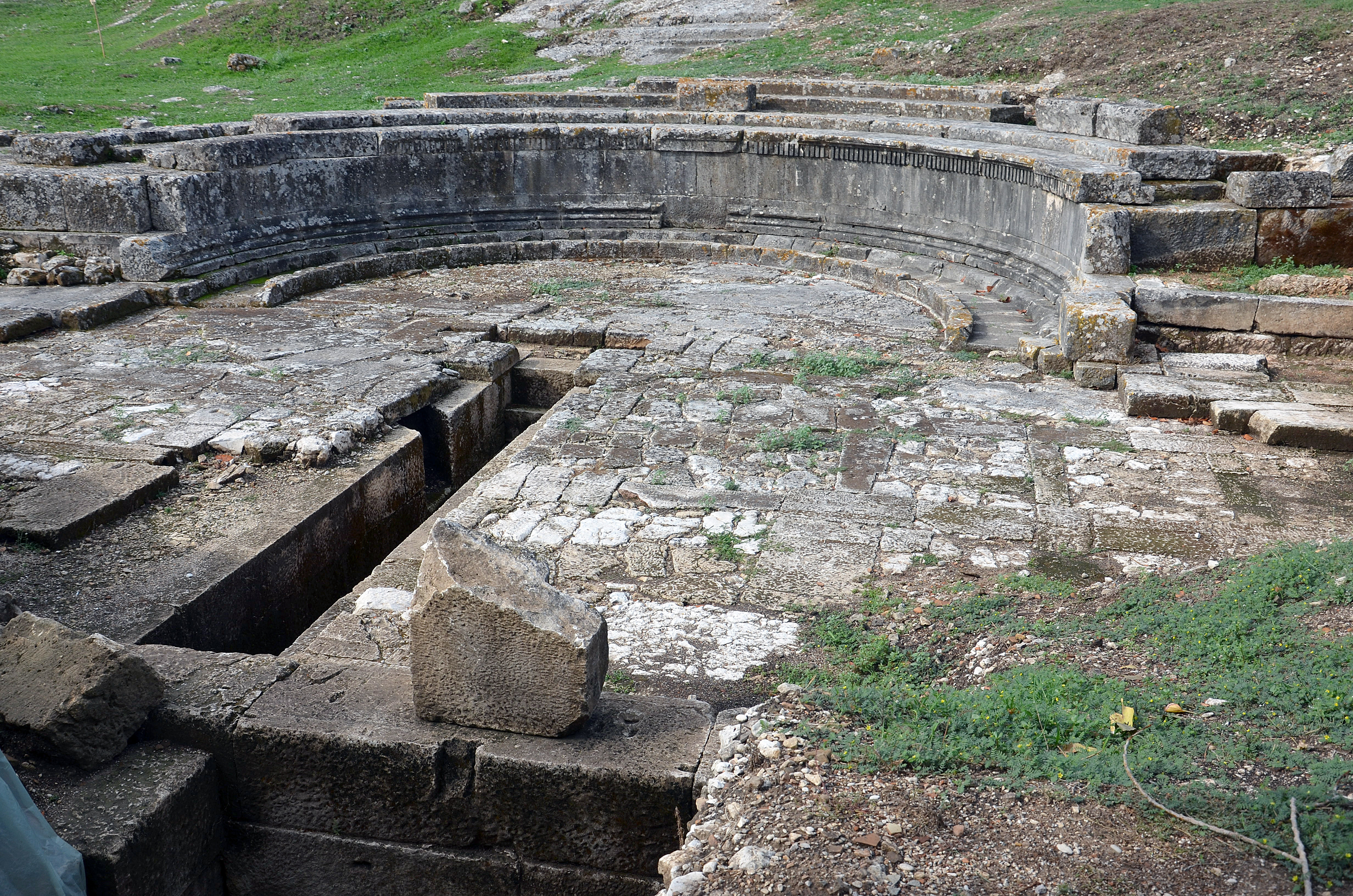
Monumental fountain

A monumental fountain (nymphaeum), previously thought to be a theatre, was also used as a cistern with diameter of 10 m (33 ft). No drinkable water springs were nearby so the city had to collect rain water.

Below, there is also an as yet unexcavated temple, and at a certain distance lies an altar that is dedicated to Dionysus. A large portion of the city found is still underwater, as a helicopter ride can show the outlines of houses underwater, indicating that the coast around the port of Oricum had slowly submerged into the sea.

Traces of walls have been found around the city, evidence shows that it was repaired during Byzantine times.

About the supreme official of Oricum publications by local archaeologists state that it was either the prytanis or the strategos; the prytanis is an institution of Epirote origin, while the title of strategos reveals influence from nearby Corfu.

== Church ==
Near the city can be found the Marmiroi Church. This is a church of dating back to the reign of the Byzantine emperor Theodore I. It has a small 6 by 9 meters (20 by 30 ft) main hall and a dome approximately 3 meters (9.8 ft) in diameter that is supported by four Roman arches. The inner walls feature fragments of typical Byzantine murals.

== See also ==
- List of cities in ancient Epirus
- List of ancient Greek cities
- List of settlements in Illyria
- Orikum
- Siege of Oricum
