= Siege of Oricum =

Siege in 48 BC

- Part of Caesar's invasion of Macedonia during Caesar's civil war
Date	Winter 48 BC
Location	Oricum, Epirus (now Albania)
Result	Populares victory

Belligerents
Populares	Optimates

Commanders and leaders
Gaius Julius Caesar	Lucius Manlius Torquatus

Strength
6 legions	Illyrian garrison

The siege of Oricum occurred in the winter of 48 BC during the Civil War, beginning in November. When Caesar approached the city of Oricum in Illyricum with an armed force, the Pompeian commander, Lucius Manlius Torquatus, surrendered without a fight. After Caesar departed for Dyrrhachium with most of his army, Gnaeus Pompeius the younger attacked Oricum with his fleet, and overcoming the harbour defenses prepared by Marcus Acilius Caninus, took the city by storm.

== Capture by Caesar ==
On January 4, 48 BC, (Note: PW gives November 6, 49 BC.) Caesar embarked from Brundisium with seven legions and six hundred select cavalry, which he carried on merchant ships, as his small number of warships was guarding Sardinia and Sicily against any approach by the Pompeians. Making for the coast of Illyricum, the fleet was driven to the Ceraunian Mountains, where the army disembarked at Palaeste, a day's march from Oricum. Caesar then sent the ships back to Italy to bring over the rest of his army, but they were attacked by the proconsul Marcus Calpurnius Bibulus, who captured several.

Because it was impossible to bring his entire force to bear upon Oricum by the same route, Caesar divided his troops into several columns, which followed different routes through the mountains that same night. Although the individual columns might have been vulnerable to attack, they reached the city without incident, and re-assembled around daybreak. The Pompeian commander, Lucius Manlius Torquatus, was prepared to defend the town with a force of Parthinian soldiers, but was forbidden by the townsfolk to resist the entry of a Roman consul, and so surrendered the town and garrison without a battle. Caesar pardoned Torquatus, whom he dismissed unharmed, and entered the city.

On the other side of Oricum, two of Pompeius' lieutenants, Lucretius and Minucius, were guarding a grain fleet with eighteen warships. Unable to get the corn to sea following the capitulation of the city, they sank the loaded vessels to prevent Caesar from obtaining the whole supply, then fled to Dyrrachium. Caesar placed Marcus Acilius Caninus, one of his legates, in charge of Oricum, and marched on Apollonia. This city likewise capitulated after the Pompeian commander, Lucius Staberius, unable to win the support of the townsfolk, fled before his approach.

== Pompeian siege ==
Caesar congratulated his army on their achievements, but was unable to strike a decisive blow in the war, as Pompeius arrived at Dyrrachium first. At Oricum, Marcus Acilius attempted to block the harbour against the Pompeian fleet by sinking a ship loaded with stones at its mouth, and anchoring another ship above it. However, the defenders were hampered by the lack of provisions, because the Pompeians had control of the sea sufficient to prevent the arrival of supplies.

Gnaeus Pompeius the younger, who had command of his father's Egyptian fleet, moved to retake Oricum. He captured the anchored ship after a fierce fight, and sent divers to remove the stones from the sunken vessel, which was then removed from the harbour. While Pompeius lay siege to the city, he attacked the undefended ships remaining in the harbour, capturing four small galleys that he brought over a natural breakwater on rollers, and burning the rest. Surrounded by hostile forces, Oricum was attacked from ship-mounted towers, while Pompeius' soldiers assaulted the walls using scaling ladders, constantly replacing his men with fresh troops, until the weary defenders capitulated.

== Aftermath ==
Having retaken Oricum, Pompeius left Decimus Laelius, detached from his father's Asian fleet, in command of a squadron charged with keeping Caesar's forces from being resupplied from Byllis and Amantia. He then proceeded to Lissus, where he burned a fleet of transports left there by Marcus Antonius, but he was unable to overcome the defenses of Caesar's garrison, and failed to take the town itself, retiring with significant losses after a siege of three days. Thus the two armies remained in a stalemate, with Caesar unable to gain Dyrrhachium, and hampered by broken supply lines, while Pompeius struggled to dislodge Caesar's footholds in Illyricum.

== See also ==
- Battle of Dyrrachium

== Bibliography ==
- Gaius Julius Caesar, Commentarii de Bello Civili (Commentaries on the Civil War).
- Appianus Alexandrinus (Appian), Bellum Civile (The Civil War).
- Lucius Cassius Dio, Roman History.
- Dictionary of Greek and Roman Geography, William Smith, ed., Little, Brown and Company, Boston (1854).
- August Pauly, Georg Wissowa, et alii, Realencyclopädie der Classischen Altertumswissenschaft (Scientific Encyclopedia of the Knowledge of Classical Antiquities, abbreviated RE or PW), J. B. Metzler, Stuttgart (1894–1980).
- T. Robert S. Broughton, The Magistrates of the Roman Republic, American Philological Association (1952–1986).
- Fik Meijer, A History of Seafaring in the Classical World, Croom Helm, London (1986).
- Michael J. G. Gray-Fow, "The Mental Breakdown of a Roman Senator: Marcus Calpurnius Bibulus", in Greece & Rome, vol. 37, No. 2 (Oct. 1990), pp. 179–190.
