= Aleks Çaçi =

Albanian author (1916–1989)

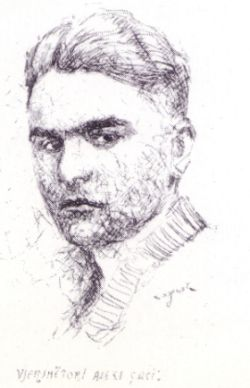
- From an early sketch of Albanian writer Lasgush Poradeci
- Born: 15 August 1916; Palasë, Himara, Albania
- Died: 23 February 1989 (aged 72); Tirana, Albania
- Writing career
- Language: Albanian
- Genre: Socialist realism

Aleks Çaçi (15 August 1916 – 23 February 1989) was an Albanian author of the socialist realism period.

== Early life ==
Aleks Çaçi came from a respected Albanian family from Palasa. He started to work at a very early stage of his life. While working the land, he also found himself employed in the printing offices of the time. Aleks Çaçi finished the Trade School of Vlora and the Institute of High Trade (business would be the equivalent of today) in Greece. After the liberation of Albania from fascism, he completed the school of the regime "Vladimir Ilic Lenin". He was among the early and young authors of the realist literature, or socialist realist as it was later dubbed, of the 1930s, as well as a member of the Communist Group of Korça.

== Literary career ==
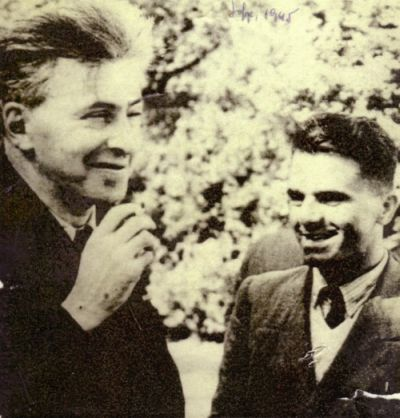
Aleks Çaçi(left) and Ilya Ehrenburg in Sofia, Bulgaria 1945

As a result of his revolutionary activities as well as his writings, in 1936, he was isolated in the city of Berat for two years by King Zogu's regime. Çaçi was an active member of the war for independence from foreign oppression. Since the early days of the organisation, he worked in the editing group of "Kushtrimi i Lirise"(Battle cry of Freedom) where he published many articles, poems and prizes. Aleks Çaçi was also in charge of another newspaper, "Trumpeta Clirimtare" (The Freedom Trumpet) which used to be published in wartime in the Kurvelesh region in south Albania.

After the war, he worked in many newspapers and literary magazines. He spent many years in China as a writer and publicist during the time when Albania had close relationships with Maoist China. For work and creative merits, Çaçi was awarded by the Congress of that time with the order of "Flamuri i Kuq i Punes"(Red flag of Work) of the First Degree. He published many books and worked in "Lidhia e Shkrimtareve" (The league of writers) until his death in 1989. Towards the 1980s, he retired in a smart fashion from the political life in Albania, which was eating countless intellectual heads for the pleasures of Enver Hoxha. This was a time of instability with the political assassinations and/or suicides and mass arrests of intellectual figures that plagued the country in the 1980s. During the last 15 years of his life, he detached himself from the political arena as corruption became rampant and the ideals of communism crumbled under the weight of ruthless dictatorship.

With his friends, he translated many books from Ancient Greek, Modern Greek and Italian into Albanian. He is widely known in Greece and Italy, and his figure is an example of an Albanian intellectual and patriot that is revered in all that area, which few people have managed to do. A Collected Works series was published by the Naim Frashëri publishing house two years before his death, featuring three volumes containing poems, prose and short plays of his diverse literary career.

== Notable works ==
- 1943: Margarita Tutulani - A Play
- 1947: Ashtu Myzeqe (That way Myzeqe)
- 1948: Me ty Stalin (With you Stalin)
- Poezia Shqipe (Albanian poetry), Tirana, Shtypshkronja "8 Nentori", 1973, OCLC: 500456887
- Këngët e dheut (The songs of the earth), Tirana, Shtëpia Botuese "Naim Frashëri", 1951. OCLC: 796234254
- Bisedë me diellin (A talk with the sun), Tirana, Shtëpia Botuese "Naim Frashëri", 1983. OCLC: 17875942
- Ëndrrat e mia (My dreams), Tirana, Shtëpia Botuese "Naim Frashëri", 1965. OCLC: 660236584
- Aroma e bukës (The scent of the bread), Tirana, Shtëpia Botuese "Naim Frashëri", 1980. OCLC: 837909419
- Na hoqën çatinë (They took our roof out), Tirana, Shtëpia Botuese "Naim Frashëri", 1965. OCLC: 660236593
- Shtëpia përballë diellit (The house in front of the sun)
- Flamuj të kuq (Red banners), Tirana, Shtëpia Botuese "Naim Frashëri", 1963. OCLC: 252410309
- Legjenda e kuqe (The red legend), Tirana, Shtëpia Botuese "Naim Frashëri", 1968. OCLC: 252410311

== See also ==
- Albanian literature
