= Dervish Ali's Towers =

Coordinates: 40.2516°N 19.5684°E

- Kullat e Dervish Aliut (Albanian)
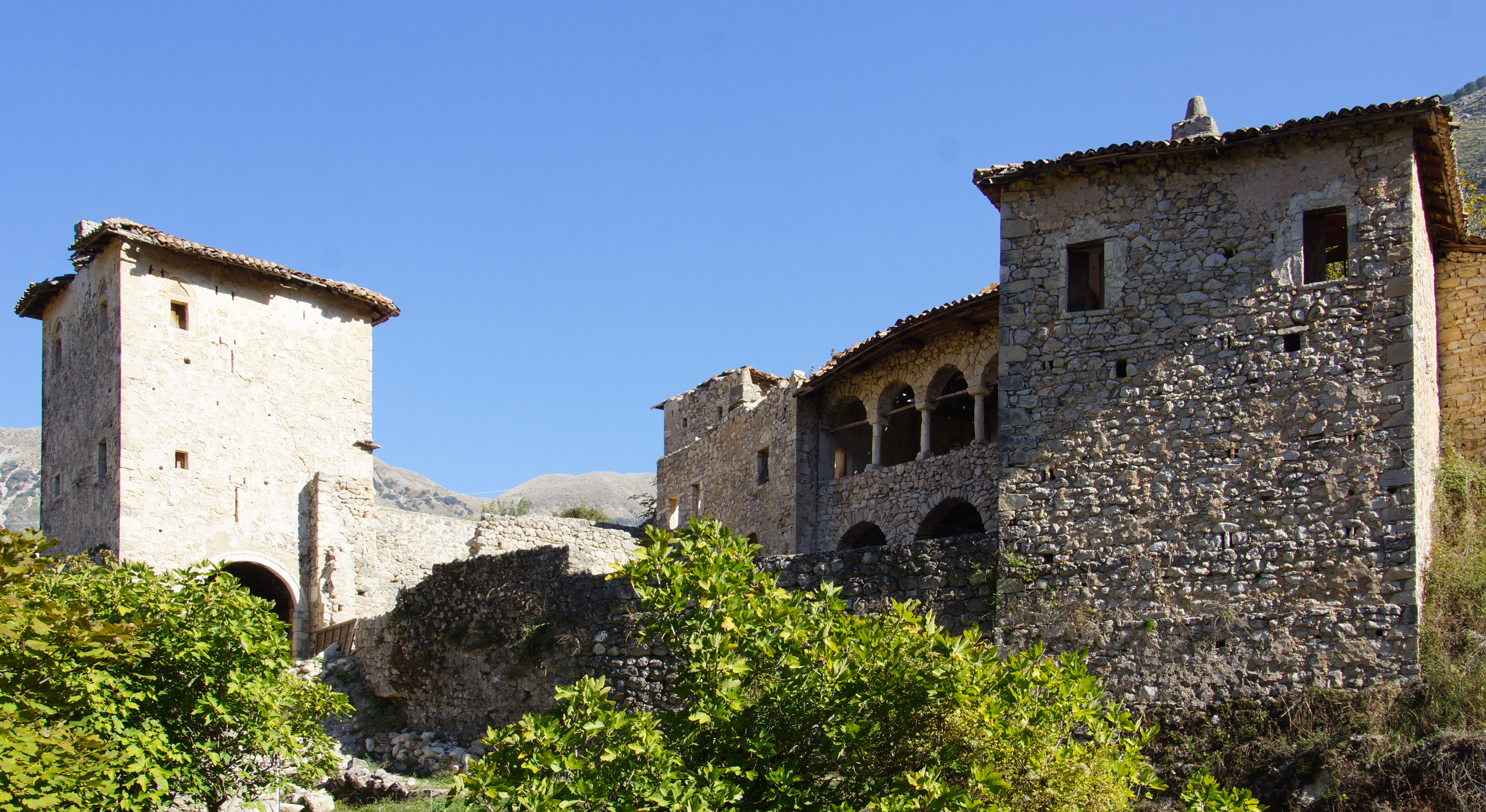
- Interactive map of Dervish Ali's Towers
- Location: Dukat

Cultural Monument of Albania

Dervish Ali's Towers (Albanian: Kullat e Dervish Aliut) are an early 19th century complex of towers in Dukat, Vlorë County, Albania. It is a Cultural Monument of Albania since 1979

== History ==
The towers were built during the beginning of the 19th century as a personal property for Dervish Aliu, a local native, known as one of the organizers of the revolts against the Ottoman Empire Tanzimat reforms. The building was constructed on his land by master builders who hailed from Ioannina. It is one of the most representative defensive buildings in Southern Albania. There is a watchtower, a defensive tower, a main hall, called divan, which has stone pillars and arches, the bread house, the guest room, and other surrounding buildings. On the highest edifice, which is in a dominating position, there are small windows made exclusively for shooters to fit their rifle and defend the property. The towers are not reachable by car; they are 1 km from Dukat, and there is a walking path that leads the visitors to the Dervish Ali's towers.

Until 1991 the towers were a well visited landmark, as the 1979 reconstruction and rehabilitation with furniture, carpeting and pictures of Dervish Aliu and his family were well made, and the government funded its maintenance. After 1991 maintenance stopped and, as of June 2018, the towers are almost in a complete abandoned state, and likely to be thoroughly destroyed by the elements.
