= Marmiroi Church =

Historic site in Vlorë County, Albania

Marmiroi church
- Kisha e Marmiroit (Albanian)
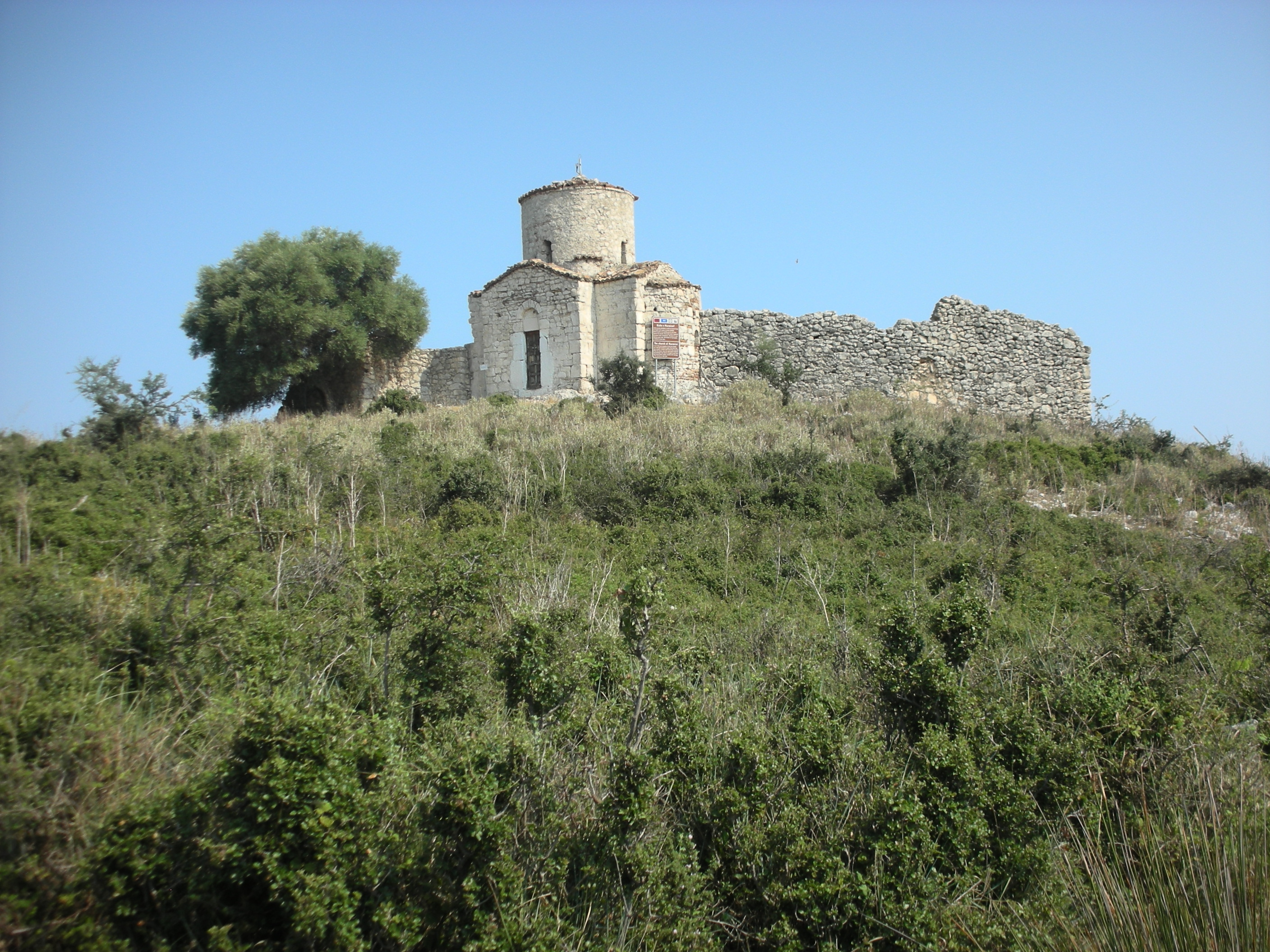
- Marmiroi church
- Interactive map of Marmiroi church
- 40.3040°N 19.4468°E
- Location: Pashaliman

Cultural Monument of Albania

Marmiroi church (Albanian: Kisha e Marmiroit) is a church near Pashaliman, Vlorë County, Albania. It is declared a Cultural Monument of Albania.

The church is mentioned in historical records for the first time in 1307. Since it has no narthex, and because of other similarities to other similar churches in Bulgaria and former Yugoslavia, it is thought to have been built in the 12th or 13th century AD, although some researchers have put its construction period in the 10th century at the end of the middle Byzantine era. The most accredited hypothesis is that it was dedicated to Saint Mary, in particular to the Mother of God of the Life-giving Spring (Zoodochos Pege).

The church is located at the gulf of Vlorë near the archaeological site of Oricum.
