= Panormus (Epirus) =

Epirus in antiquity

Panormus or Panormos (Ancient Greek: Πάνορμος) was an ancient Greek harbor settlement mentioned by the geographer Ptolemy, in Chaonia in ancient Epirus, situated nearly midway between Oricum and Onchesmus. Strabo describes it as a great harbour in the midst of the Ceraunian Mountains.

It site is possibly located at Porto Palermo south of Himare, Albania.

== See also ==
- List of cities in ancient Epirus
