= Llogara Pass =

Pass in Albania

- IUCN category II (national park)
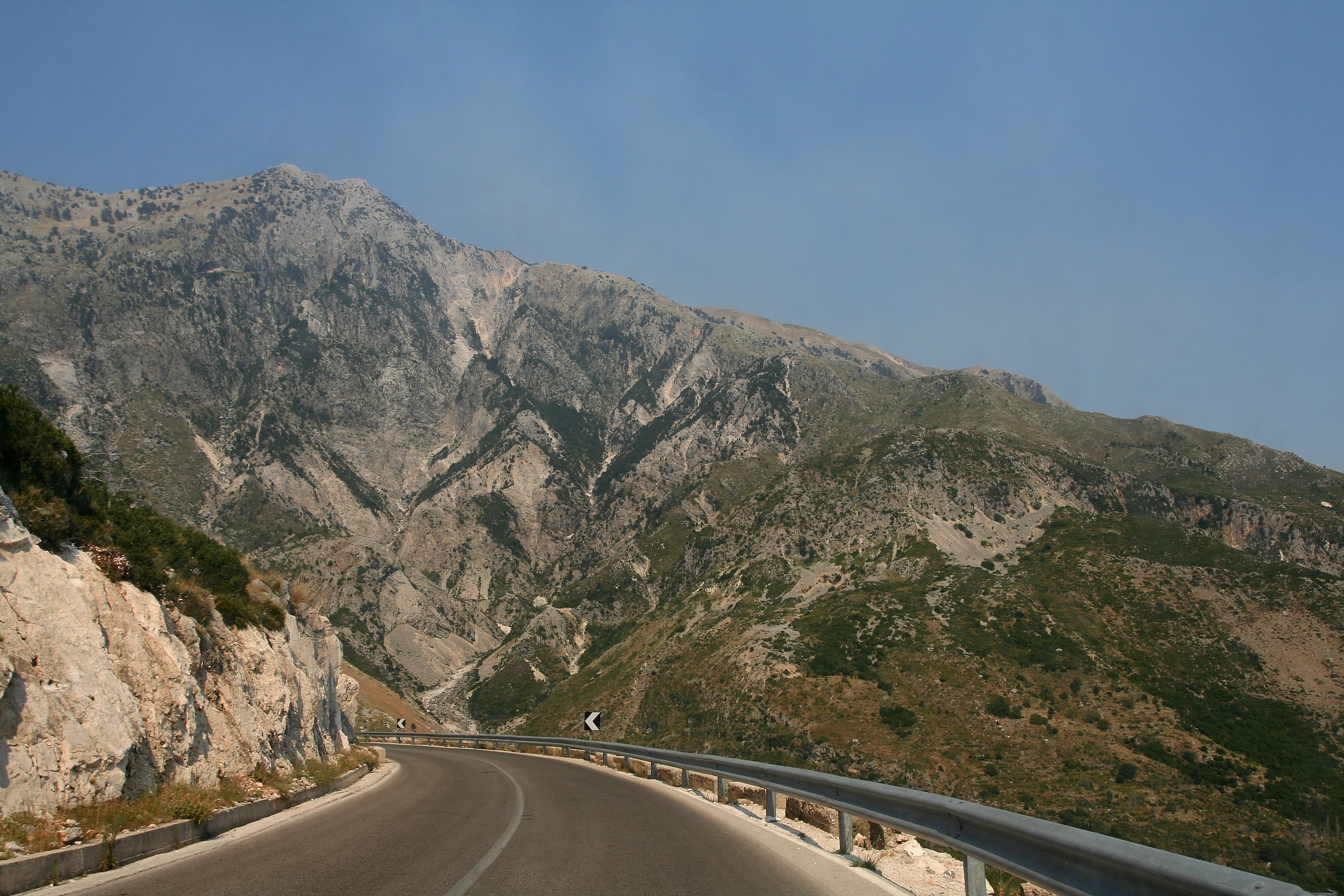
- View of Maja e Çikës from the SH8

- Location within Albania
- Interactive map of Llogara Pass
- Location: Orikum and Vlorë, Albania
- Coordinates: 40°11′55″N 19°35′30″E
- Elevation: 1,027 metres (3,369 ft)
- Established: 1966

The Llogara Pass (Albanian: Qafa e Llogarasë); (also Llogora in local dialect) is a high mountain pass within the Ceraunian Mountains along the Albanian Riviera. It connects the Dukat Valley in the north with Himarë in the south. Orikum is the nearest city on the northern side of the pass and the village of Dhërmi in the south.

The Llogara Pass is also part of the Llogara National Park, which spans an area of 10.1 km^{2} (3.9 sq mi).

== See also ==
- Llogara National Park
- Geography of Albania
- Mountain passes of Albania
