= Bay of Vlorë =

Bay in Albania bordering the Adriatic Sea

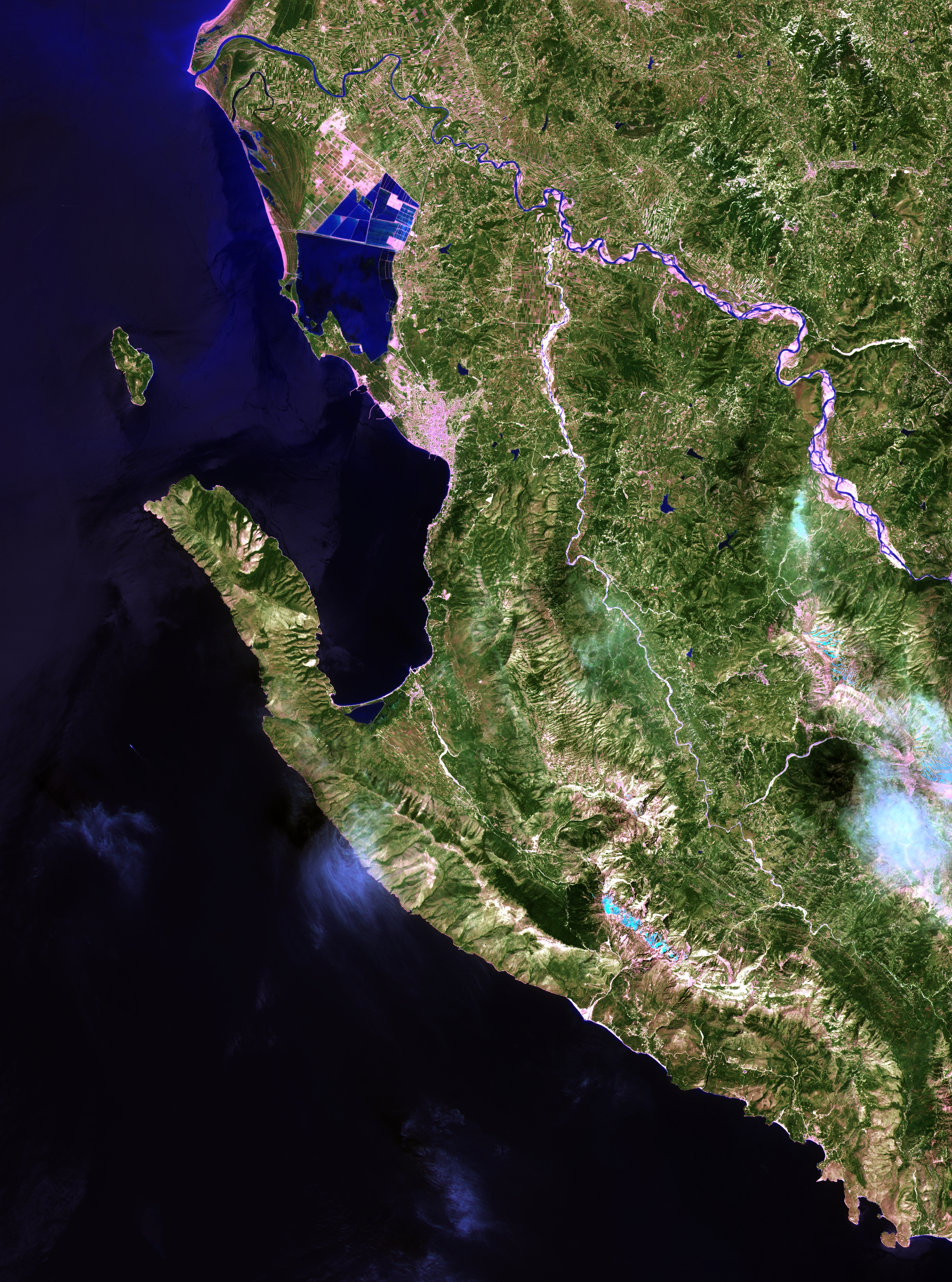
- Map of the Bay of Vlorë

- Location within Albania
- Location: Southern Europe
- Coordinates: 40°27′0″N 19°24′0″E
- Ocean/sea sources: Adriatic Sea, Ionian Sea (Mediterranean Sea)
- Basin countries: Albania
- Max. length: 10 km (6.2 mi)
- Surface area: 250 km^{2} (97 sq mi)
- Average depth: 25 m (82 ft)
- Settlements: Vlorë

The Bay of Vlorë (Albanian: Gjiri i Vlorës, pronounced [ˈɟiɾi i ˈvlɔɾəs]) is a large bay of the Adriatic Sea situated along the Albanian Adriatic Sea Coast on the Mediterranean Sea in Southern Europe. It opens to the sea in the northwest and is largely surrounded by the lagoon of Narta in the north, the city of Vlorë in the northeast, the mountains of the Ceraunians in the east and southeast, and the peninsula of Karaburun in the southwest and west.

== Biodiversity ==
The bay is categorized as an Important Bird and Plant Area by virtue of it provides excellent habitats for a vast array of bird and plant species.

== Geography ==
The Karaburun Peninsula, which stretches at the meetingpoint of the Adriatic and Ionian Sea, encompasses the western shoreline of the bay that is highly hilly and irregular in structure and is home to the Karaburun-Sazan Marine Park.

== History ==
In classical antiquity the Bay of Vlorë constituted the southern limit of the Illyrian coast. The Bay is delimited by the mountainous area of the Karaburun Peninsula (ancient Akrokeraunia) to the southwest and the Ceraunian Mountains to the south, which represented a natural frontier separating Illyria from Epirus. The coastal area of the Bay was settled by Ancient Greek colonists, who traditionally founded Oricum, Thronion and Aulon. Illyrians were found in the hinterland of the Bay. The area at the foot of the Akrokeraunian Mountains including the Dukat plain in the south of the Bay was inhabited by the southernmost Illyrians, while Chaones and their territory, Chaonia, were located to the south of the Akrokeraunia.

In Roman times, the region was a significant place and was the scene, for example, of some of Caesar's battles. It has been suggested that Julius Caesar landed inside the Bay of Vlorë from Brundusium across the Adriatic, in order to carry on the Civil War against Pompey in Illyricum and the oncoming Battle of Dyrrhachium on 10 July 48 BC. Ptolemy mentions Aulon (Vlorë), locating it in Taulantian territory.

In one account, 18 ships full of merchandise have sunk in the Bay. Studying the Bay of Vlorë, it has been one of the main projects of the navigation department of the University of Vlora in the last few years. The southwestern end of the Bay, at the naval base of Pashaliman, has been used as a harbor since antiquity. The city was called Oricum. During the Cold War, it was temporarily a Soviet naval base, the only one in the Mediterranean sea.

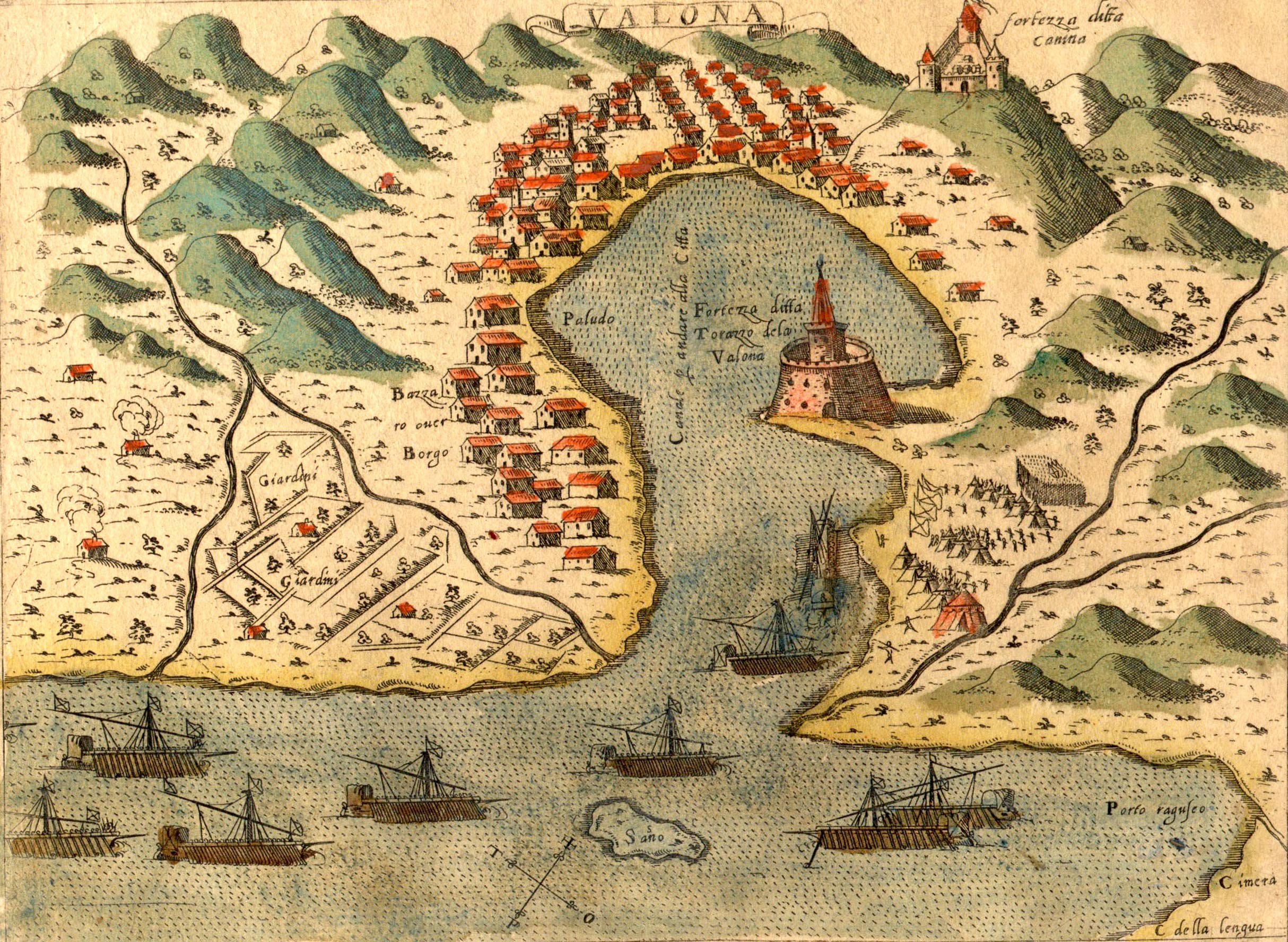
Historical map of the Bay in 1573

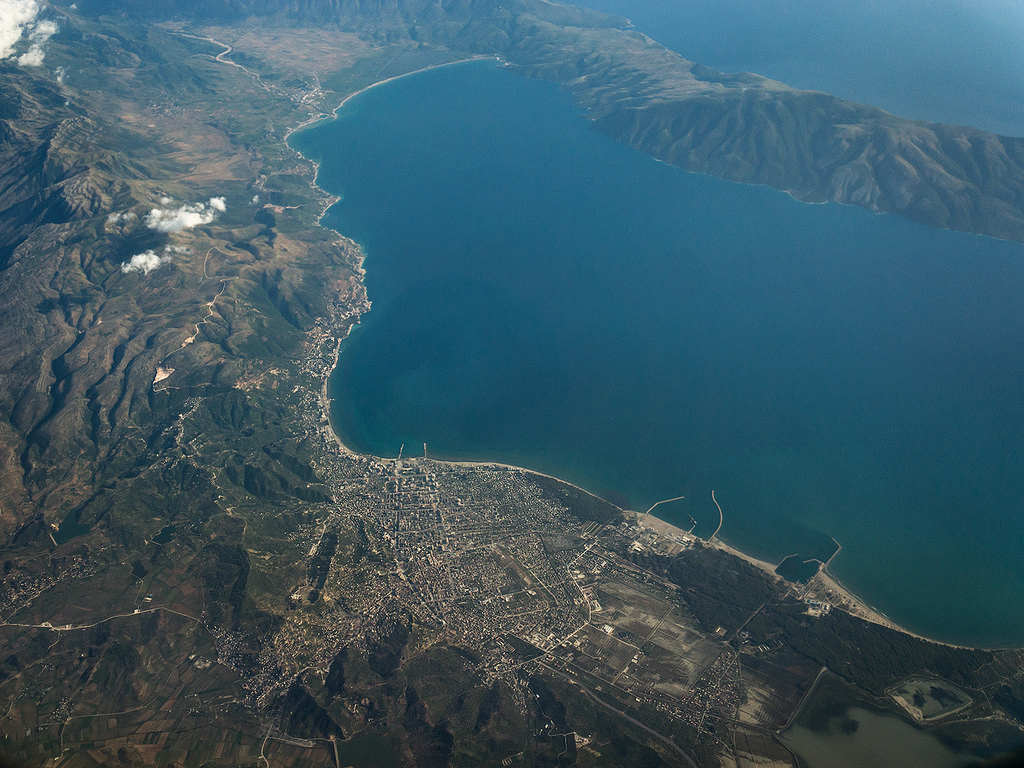
View from the air

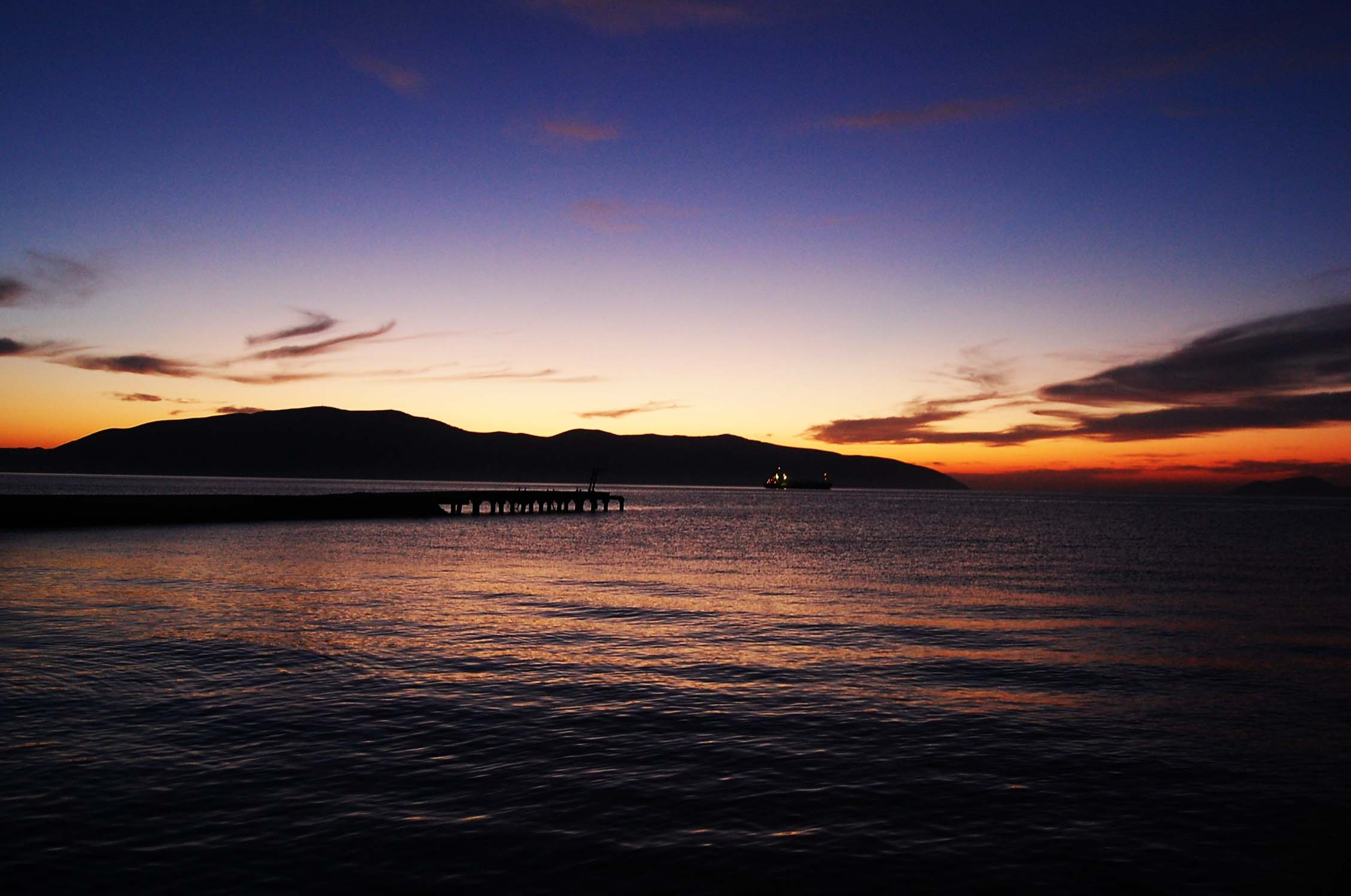
At sunset

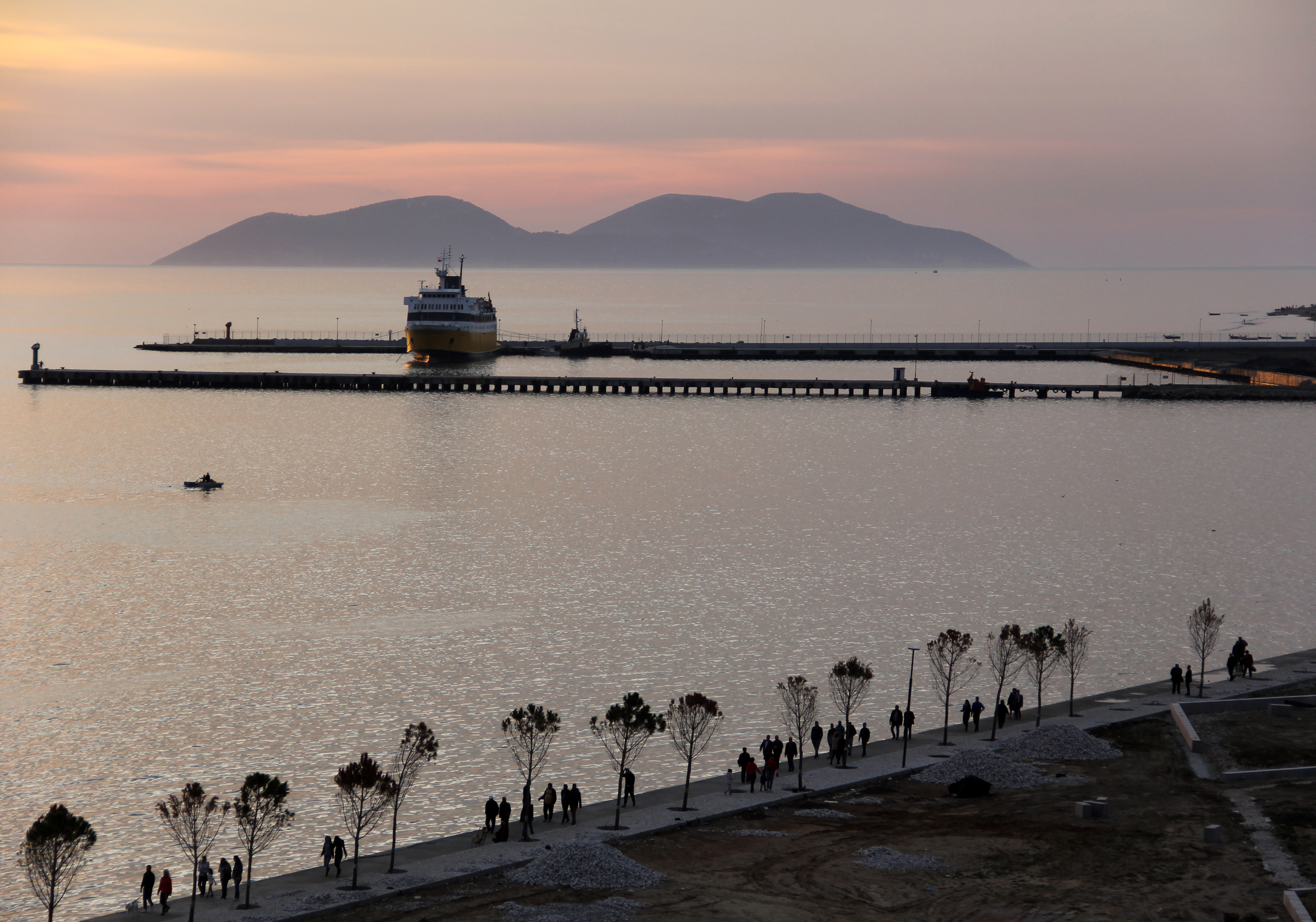
Port of Vlorë

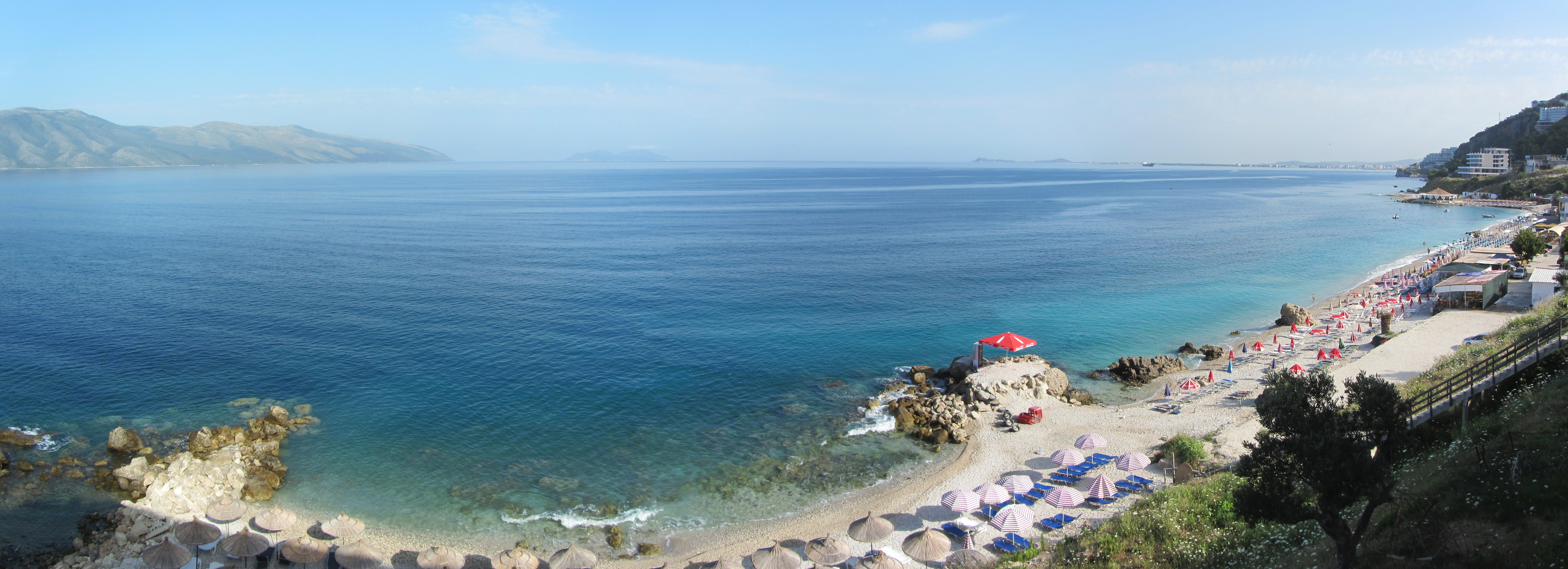
Panoramic view

== See also ==
- Biodiversity of Albania
- Geography of Albania
- Protected areas of Albania

== Bibliography ==
- Bejko, Lorenc; Morris, Sarah; Papadopoulos, John; Schepartz, Lynne (2015). The Excavation of the Prehistoric Burial Tumulus at Lofkend, Albania. ISD LLC. ISBN 978-1938770524.
- Cabanes, Pierre (2008). "Greek Colonisation in the Adriatic". In Tsetskhladze, Gocha R. (ed.). Greek Colonisation: An Account of Greek Colonies and Other Settlements Overseas. Vol. 2. Brill. pp. 155–186. ISBN 9789047442448.
- De Simone, Carlo (2017). "Illyrian". In Klein, Jared; Joseph, Brian; Fritz, Matthias (eds.). Handbook of Comparative and Historical Indo-European Linguistics. Vol. 3. Walter de Gruyter. pp. 1867–1872. ISBN 978-3-11-054243-1.
- Hammond, N. G. L.; Wilkes, J. J. (2012). "Illyrii". In Hornblower, Simon; Spawforth, Antony; Eidinow, Esther (eds.). The Oxford Classical Dictionary. OUP Oxford. p. 726. ISBN 978-0-19-954556-8.
- Jaupaj, Lavdosh (2019). Etudes des interactions culturelles en aire Illyro-épirote du VII au III siècle av. J.-C (Thesis). Université de Lyon; Instituti i Arkeologjisë (Albanie).
- Longhurst, Ian (2016). "Caesar's Crossing of the Adriatic Countered by a Winter Blockade During the Roman Civil War". The Mariner's Mirror. 102 (2). Routledge: 132–152. doi:10.1080/00253359.2015.1054681. S2CID 163921681.
- Malkin, Irad (2001). "Greek Ambiguities: Between "Ancient Hellas" and "Barbarian Epirus"". In Malkin, Irad (ed.). Ancient Perceptions of Greek Ethnicity. Center for Hellenic Studies colloquia. Vol. 5. Center for Hellenic Studies, Trustees for Harvard University. pp. 187–212. ISBN 978-0-674-00662-1.
- Papadopoulos, John (2016). "Komai, Colonies and Cities in Epirus and Southern Albania: The Failure of the Polis and the Rise of Urbanism on the Fringes of the Greek World". In Molloy, Barry P.C. (ed.). Of Odysseys and Oddities: Scales and Modes of Interaction Between Prehistoric Aegean Societies and their Neighbours. Oxbow Books. pp. 435–460. ISBN 978-1-78570-232-7.
- Shpuza, Saimir (2022). "D'un limên à une polis. Orikos aux périodes archaïque et classique". In Brancato, Rodolfo (ed.). Schemata: la città oltre la forma : per una nuova definizione dei paesaggi urbani e delle loro funzioni: urbanizzazione e società nel Mediterraneo pre-classico : età arcaica. Edizioni Quasar. ISBN 9788854912755.
- Zindel, Christian; Lippert, Andreas; Lahi, Bashkim; Kiel, Machiel (2018). Albanien: Ein Archäologie- und Kunstführer von der Steinzeit bis ins 19. Jahrhundert (in German). Vandenhoeck & Ruprecht. ISBN 9783205200109.
