= Orikum =

- Administrative unit
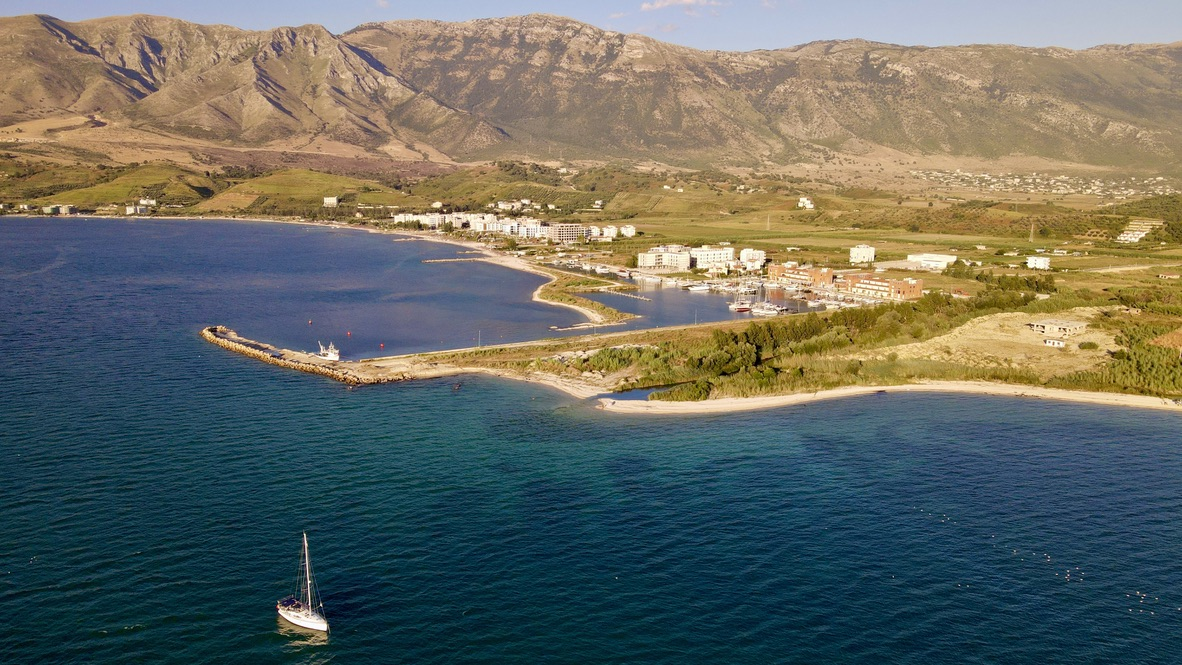

- Location within Albania
- Coordinates: 40°20′N 19°28′E
- Country: Albania
- County: Vlorë
- Municipality: Vlorë

Population (2011)
  - Administrative unit: 5,503
- Time zone: UTC+1 (CET)
  - Summer (DST): UTC+2 (CEST)
- Postal Code: 9426
- Area Code: 0391

Orikum is a town and a former municipality in Vlorë County, southwestern Albania. With the 2015 local government reform, it became a subdivision of the municipality Vlorë. It was named after the ancient city Oricum, which was located 4 km west of modern Orikum. The population at the 2011 census was 5,503. The municipal unit consists of the town Orikum and the villages Dukat Fushë, Dukat, Tragjas and Radhimë.

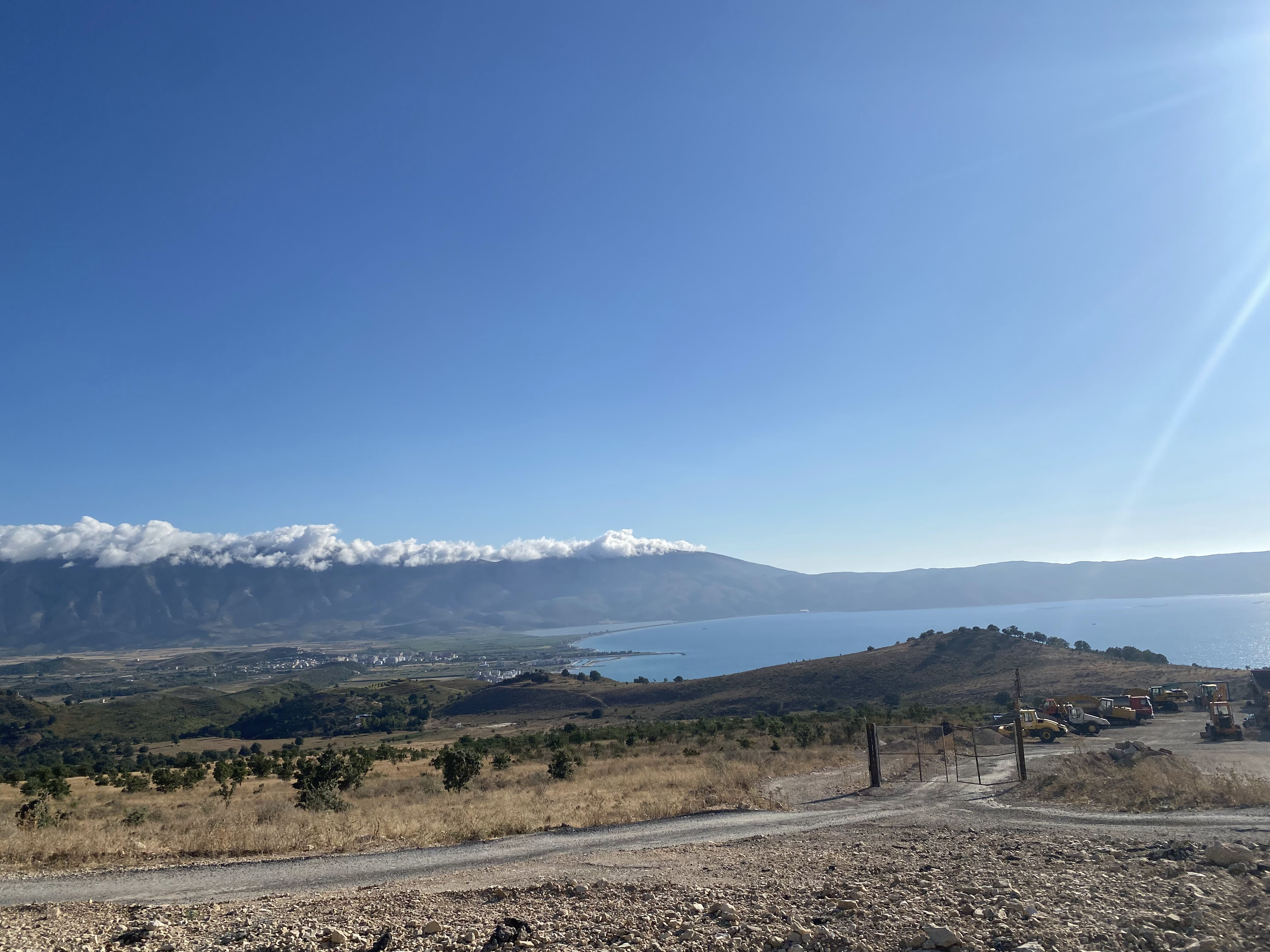
The town of Orikum is situated in the most southern part of Vlora Bay. The image is taken from the high grounds in the eastern side of Vlora Bay
