= Palaeste =

Ancient Greek settlement

Palaeste or Palaiste was a town in the Ceraunian Mountains, on the Chaonian coast, between the southern Adriatic and the Ionian Sea. The town was placed south of the Akrokeraunian Promontory, the natural boundary that separated Epirus from Illyria in classical antiquity. It was located near modern day Palasë in Albania.

== Etymology ==
The name Palaiste is considered to be Illyrian. It is linked to the root morpheme *pal- (shallow water) and the typical Illyrian suffix -este. The ethnic name Palaistinoi comes from Palaiste, with the typical Illyrian suffix -ino often used to form tribal names. The root *pal is also found in the name of the Illyrian tribe of the Plaraioi/Palarioi. Pseudo-Plutarch reports that Palaistinos was another name of the river Strymon. The name has been speculated to be related to the ethnonym Philistines.

== History ==
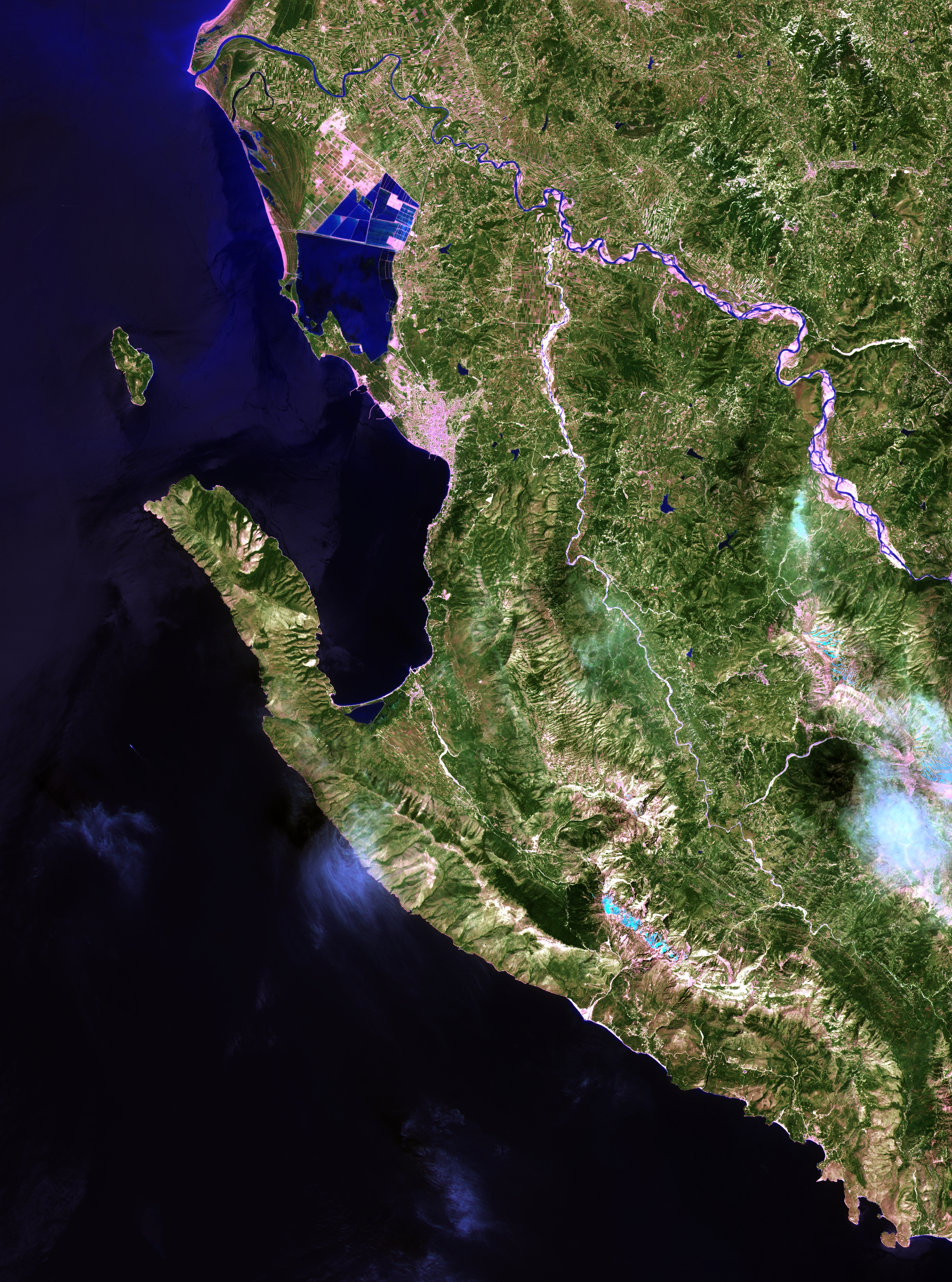

=== Caesar's landing in 48 B.C ===
Ancient Roman writer Lucan reported that it was here that Julius Caesar landed from Brundusium across the Adriatic, in order to carry on the Civil War against Pompey in Illyricum and the oncoming Battle of Dyrrhachium on 10 July 48 BC. According to Ian Longhurst, an analysis of other ancient sources, based on geographical and military data, suggests a more likely location for Caesar's landing inside the Bay of Vlorë north of the Ceraunian Mountains. Neritan Ceka analysed the local places by a site survey on the Acroceraunia comparing their situation with the ancient sources, and accepted the historical account of Caesar's landing on Palaeste.

== Geography ==
In classical antiquity Palaeste was located in the Ceraunian Mountains, between the southern Adriatic and the Ionian Sea. The town was placed south of the Akrokeraunian Promontory, which was the natural boundary that separated Epirus from Illyria in classical antiquity. Located near modern day Palasë on the northernmost coastal part of the ancient Kemara region (modern Himara, Albania), Palaeste was part of the territory of the Chaones. The present-day village of Dhërmi has been proposed as a possible location of the ancient site.

== Bibliography ==
- Berktold, Percy; Wacker, Christian (1996). Akarnanien: eine Landschaft im antiken Griechenland. Ergon. ISBN 3928034715.
- Jaupaj, Lavdosh (2019). Etudes des interactions culturelles en aire Illyro-épirote du VII au III siècle av. J.-C (Thesis). Université de Lyon; Instituti i Arkeologjisë (Albanie).
- Ceka, Neritan (2011). "Cezari në Akrokeraune- vende dhe gjurmë / Cesare in acroceraunia-luoghi e tracce". Iliria. 35: 99–122. doi:10.3406/iliri.2011.1101.
- de Ligt, Luuk (2008). "An Eteocretan inscription from Praisos and the Homeland of the Sea Peoples". Talanta (XL–XLI): 151–172.
- Hencken, Hugh (1968). Tarquinia, Villanovans, and Early Etruscans, Volume 1. Bulletin (American School of Prehistoric Research), American School of Prehistoric Research and Harvard University, Peabody Museum, American School of Prehistoric Research. Bulletin. Vol. 23. Peabody Museum.
- Likaj, Ethem (1990). "Die illyrische Herkunft des Albanischen im Lichte neuer Fakten und Interpretationen". Akten Des XIV. Internationalen Linguistenkongresses Berlin, 10. August-15. August 1987. Akademie-Verlag. ISBN 3050006579.
- Longhurst, Ian (2016). "Caesar's Crossing of the Adriatic Countered by a Winter Blockade During the Roman Civil War". The Mariner's Mirror. 102 (2). Routledge: 132–152. doi:10.1080/00253359.2015.1054681. S2CID 163921681.
- Sakellariou, M. V. (1997). Ηπειρος: 4000 χρόνια ελληνικής ιστορίας και πολιτισμού. Ekdotike Athenon. ISBN 9789602133712.
- Strobel, August (2015) [1976]. Der spätbronzezeitliche Seevölkersturm: Ein Forschungsüberblick mit Folgerungen zur biblischen Exodusthematik. Beihefte zur Zeitschrift für die alttestamentliche Wissenschaft (in German). Vol. 145. Walter de Gruyter GmbH & Co KG. ISBN 9783110855036.
