= Karaburun-Sazan Marine Park =

Protected area and a tourist attraction in Albania

- Parku Detar Karaburun-Sazan
- IUCN category II (national park)
- Official logo

- Location within Albania Location within Europe
- Location: Vlorë County
- Nearest city: Vlorë
- Coordinates: 40°21′59.99″N 19°21′59.99″E
- Area: 12,437.7 hectares (124.377 km^{2})
- Designated: 28 April 2010
- Governing body: National Agency of Protected Areas
- Website: https://karaburun-sazan.net/

Karaburun-Sazan Marine Park (Albanian: Parku Detar Karaburun-Sazan) is a national marine park in the Vlorë County of southwestern Albania. The marine park encompasses over 125.70 km^{2} (48.53 sq mi) and comprises the boundaries of both the Peninsula of Karaburun and the Island of Sazan. It is home to a vast array of landforms, including mountains, caves, islands, depressions, bays, cliffs, canyons and rocky coasts, all contributing to an exceptionally considerable biological diversity. The marine park has been identified as an Important Bird and Plant Area, because it supports immense bird and plant species. Containing ecosystems and habitats that are specific to the Mediterranean Basin, the convention of Barcelona has classified the marine park as a Specially Protected Areas of Mediterranean Importance.

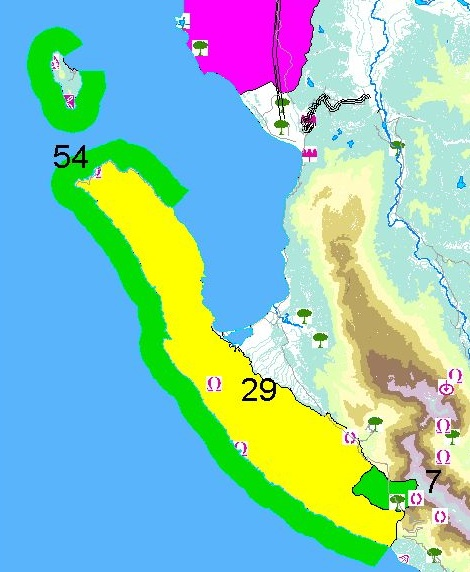
Karaburun-Sazan Marine Park coverage area

The Karaburun Peninsula is mostly hilly and a geological continuation of the Ceraunian Mountains, a mountain range rising immediately along the Ionian Sea. Its crests combine a northwest–southeast line with a series of distinct peaks along its irregular structure that are broken apart by steep and irregular slopes. The coastal landscape is marked by a rough relief and calcareous limestone cliffs, that dips vertically into the sea. The uninhabited Sazan Island is primarily made up of limestone rocks, which was formed during the Cretaceous period. The waters of Mezokanal in the south separate the island from the peninsula. The most characteristic feature of the island is its unique climate. The island's climate is not mediterranean but rather subtropical on account of its warm winters and hot summers, resembling those of the south of Crete, of Tunisia and Egypt.

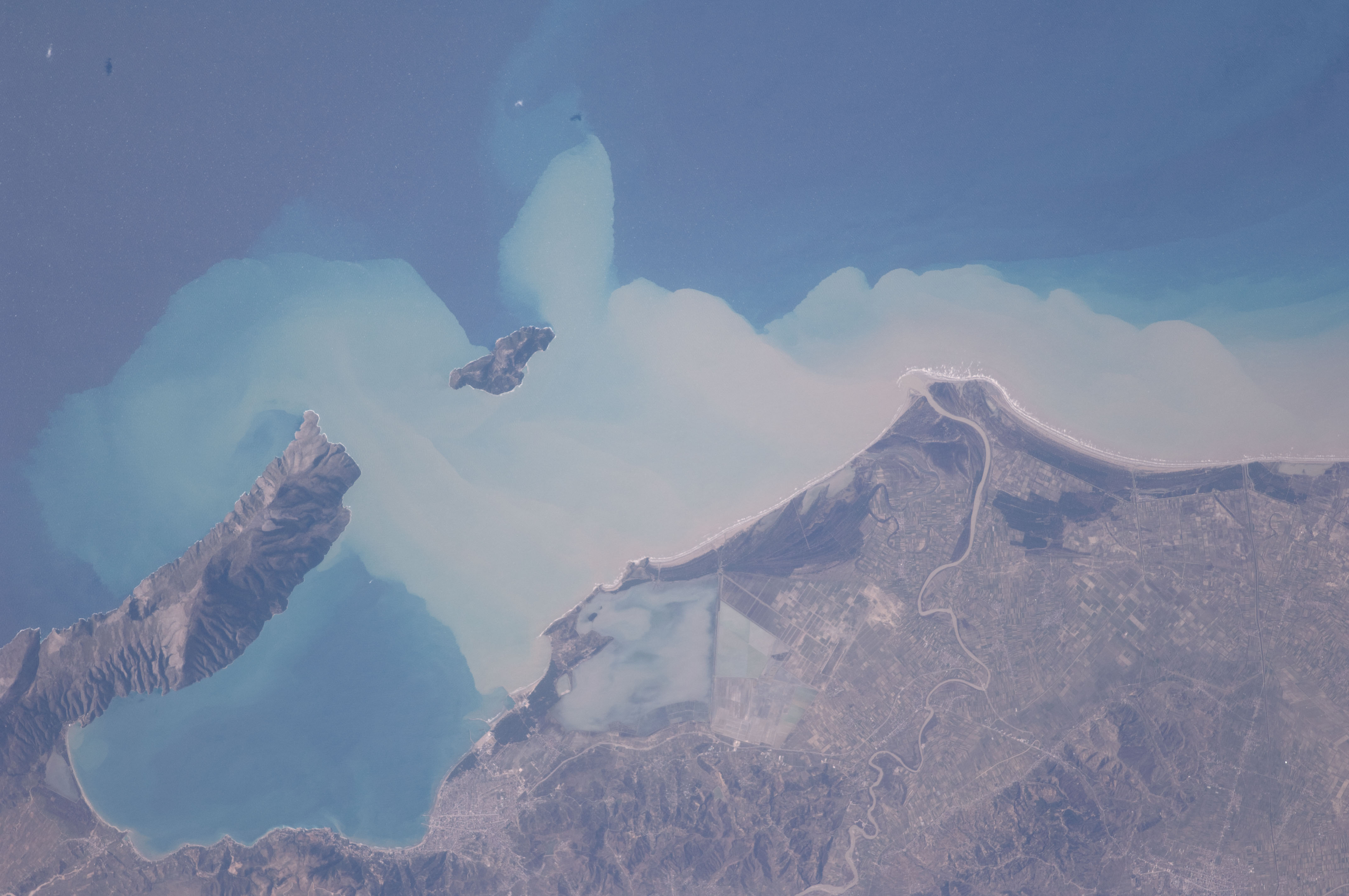
Satellite view of the Karaburun Peninsula and Sazan

The marine park contains diverse landforms offering favourable conditions for a great vegetation and biodiversity. In terms of phytogeography, it falls completely within the Illyrian deciduous forests terrestrial ecoregion, of the Palearctic Mediterranean forests, woodlands, and scrub biome. The marine park is distinguished for its diversity of habitats and its richness in flora and fauna. Hundreds of species of mammals, birds, fish, and reptiles have been documented, including several that are either endangered or threatened. Almost 55 species of mammals, 105 species of birds, 28 species of reptiles and 10 species of amphibia are known to occur within peninsula, while the island is inhabited by 15 species of mammals, 39 species of birds, 8 species of reptiles, 1 species of amphibia and as well as 122 species of invertebrates.

The marine park features ruins of sunken ancient Greek, Roman and World War II ships, rich underwater fauna, steep cliffs and giant caves, ancient inscriptions of sailors on shore, secluded beaches and scenic views of the Adriatic and Ionian Sea. The marine park is located near military bases, so permission may be required from local authorities first. The hiring of a professional local diver for serving as tour guide is thoroughly recommended. Roads are in inaccessible, and the only ways to reach the above areas are by sea or through all day hiking.

== Geology ==
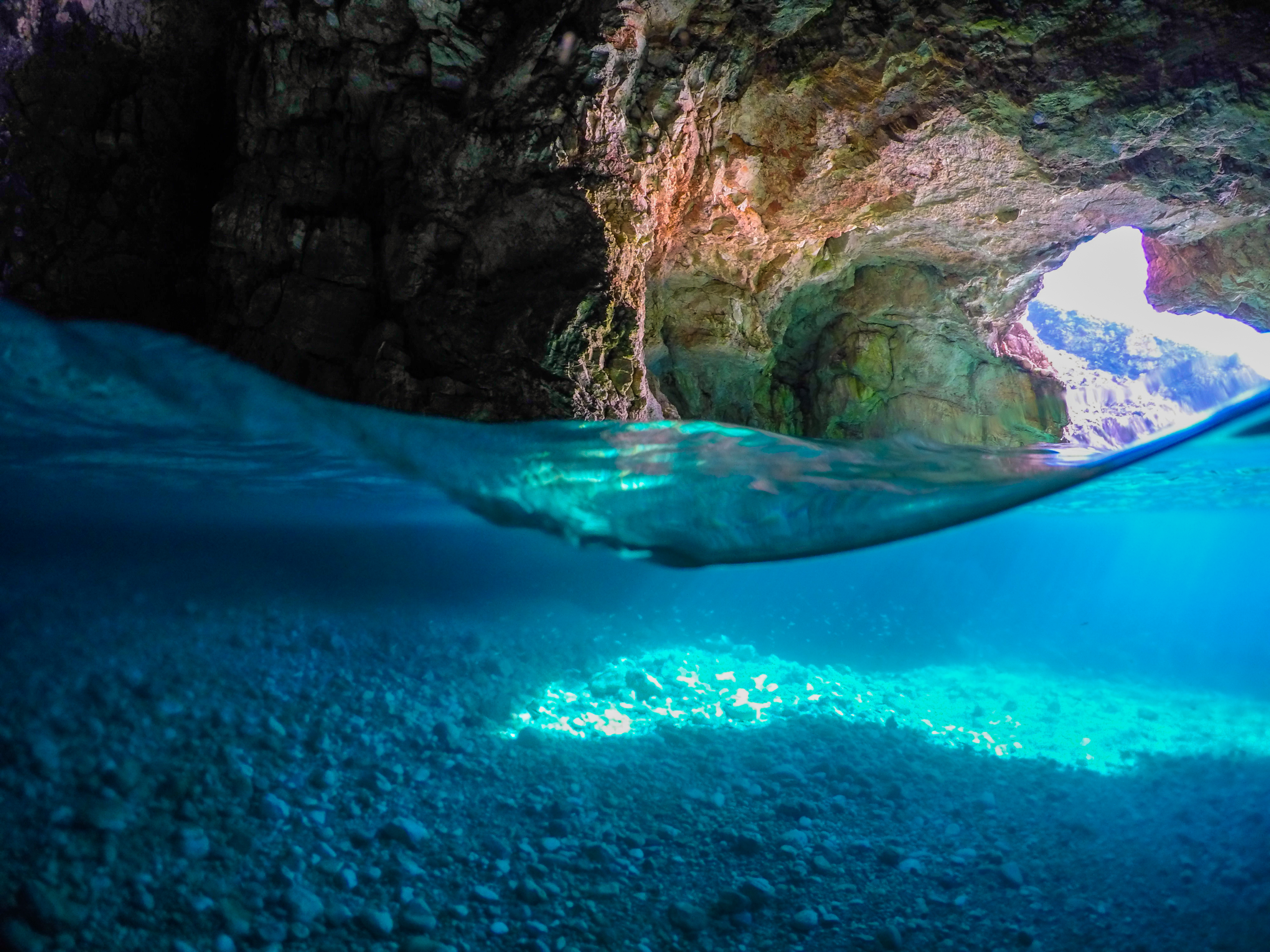
Shpella e Dafinës, caves appear mostly underwater.

The Karaburun-Sazan Marine Park is strategically located in the eastern shore of the Strait of Otranto. It lies primarily between latitudes 40° and 26° N and longitudes 19° and 18° E. The marine park comprises 125.70 km^{2} (48.53 sq mi) in Vlorë County in southwestern Albania. The marine park includes the Karaburun Peninsula with Reza e Kanalit and Sazan Island. In terms of geology, the peninsula belongs to the Ceraunian Mountains, which rises steeply along the Albanian Ionian Sea Coast. Running towards the Llogara Pass, the mountains gets divided into two mountain chains. Reza e Kanalit encompasses the southern portion of the Karaburun Peninsula. It is marked by a narrow and steep platform, extending from the peninsula to the Dukat Valley close to Orikum. The mountains are about 24 km (15 mi) long and about 4–7 km (2.5–4.3 mi) wide. The marine park's mountainous terrain and its geographic features result in the area being of high interest to both visitors and researchers. It experiences a mediterranean climate. This means that the winters are rainy and dry, and the summers are warm to hot. Mean monthly temperature ranges between 8–10 °C (46–50 °F) (in January) and 24–26 °C (75–79 °F) (in July). Mean annual precipitation ranges between 1,000 millimetres (39 inches) and 1,200 millimetres (47 inches) depending on geographic region and prevailing climate type.

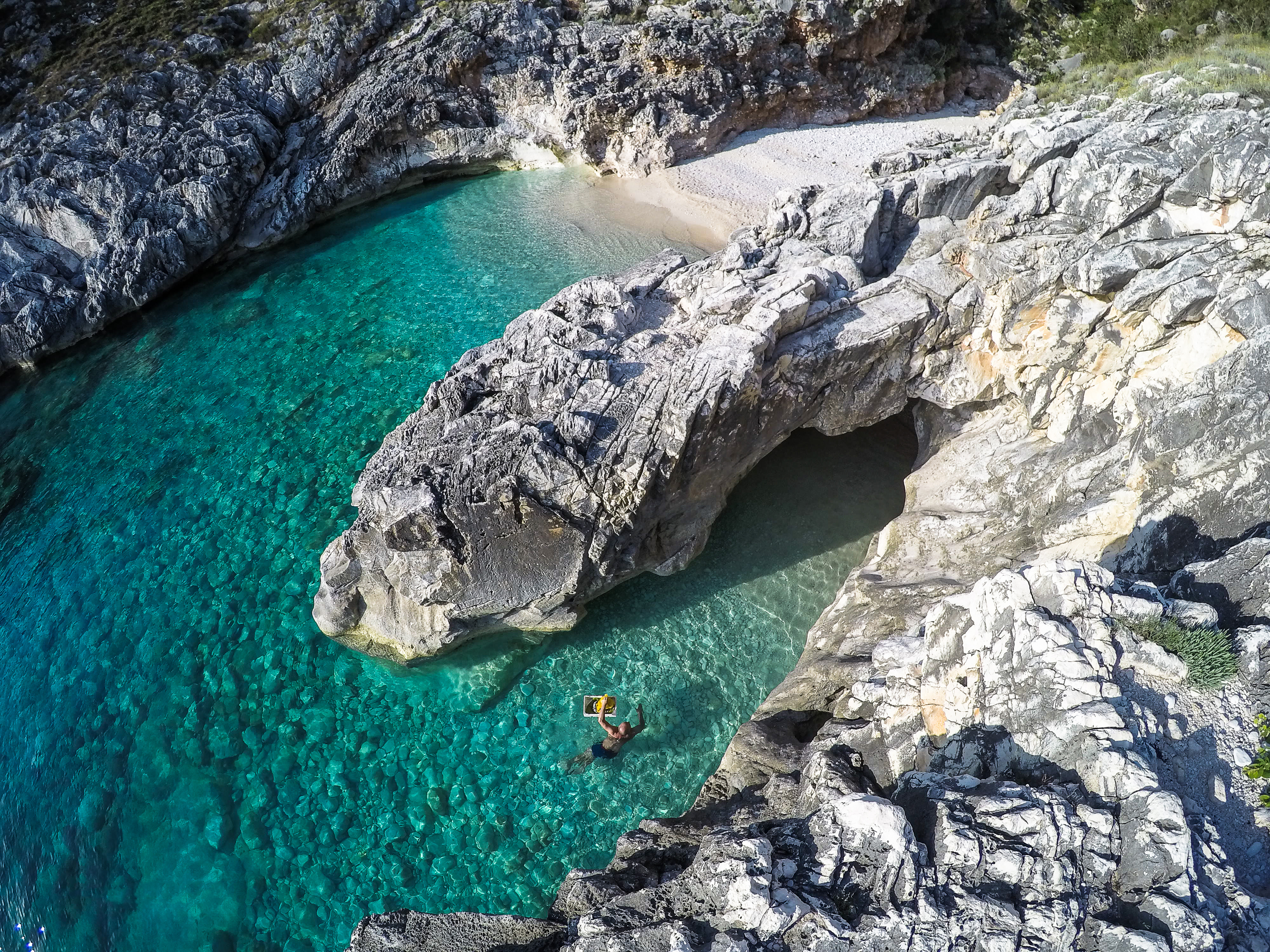
Gjiri i Skalomës. Numerous bays are located on the western shore of the Peninsula.

The relief comprises a number of mountains that rises to an elevation of 800 metres (2,600 ft) above the Adriatic. In the west, the mountains in the peninsula falls steeply into the Ionian Sea. The most elevated natural points are Maja e Shendelliut at 1,499.5 metres (4,920 ft), Maja Ali Hila at 1,318 metres (4,324 ft), Maja e Ilqes at 733 metres (2,405 ft), Maja e Flamurit at 826 metres (2,710 ft) and Maja Çadëri at 839 metres (2,753 ft). The Mesokanali, a narrow natural channel, separates the peninsula from the island. Sazan is the largest island in the country, having a length of 4.8 km (3.0 mi) and a width of 2.7 km (1.7 mi), with a surface area of 5.7 km^{2} (2.2 sq mi). It is surrounded by the Adriatic Sea in the north and the Ionian Sea in the south.

The peninsula was shaped into its current form over several geological eras with the tectonic merging of Paleozoic schist formations, Mesozoic limestone and marble deposits. It is principally made up of carbonic limestone from the Mesozoic period, while the northwest is composed of terrigenous sediment. The south is chiefly composed of Pliocene rock formations and a variety of sediments. The rocks found in the west of the Sazan Island are primarily Cretaceous rocks. The east is essentially composed of limestone rocks, that has been formed during the Burdigalian age.

== Fauna and flora ==
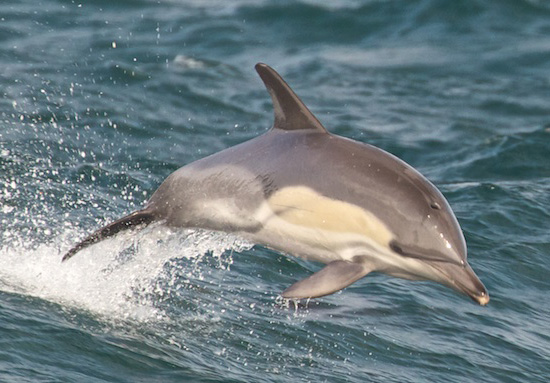
The short-beaked common dolphin is often seen in the region

The optimal conditions, in terms of geology and hydrology as well as the Mediterranean climate with subtropical influences, have created diverse habitats that in turn provide favourable circumstances for the equally diverse mix of plants and animals that thrive in the area. The park is home to at least 70 species of mammals, 144 species of birds, 36 species of reptiles and 11 species of amphibia. It also contains a vast array of invertebrates represented with 167 species.

The diverse landscapes of the park, with an exceptionally considerable marine and terrestrial life free of any marks of human disturbance, maintain a particular appeal. The park is home to an incredible array of mammal species whose numbers are more than 70. The most common are the golden jackal, wildcat, chamois, roe deer, wild boar, badger and otter. A few of the smaller mammals typically include the red squirrel, hazel dormouse and pine vole. There are 8 species of bats to be found merely in the island of Sazan. Several of them, like the Kuhl's and Nathusius's pipistrelle, are widespread and common, while others, like the Mediterranean long-eared bat, are relatively rare and restricted in distribution.

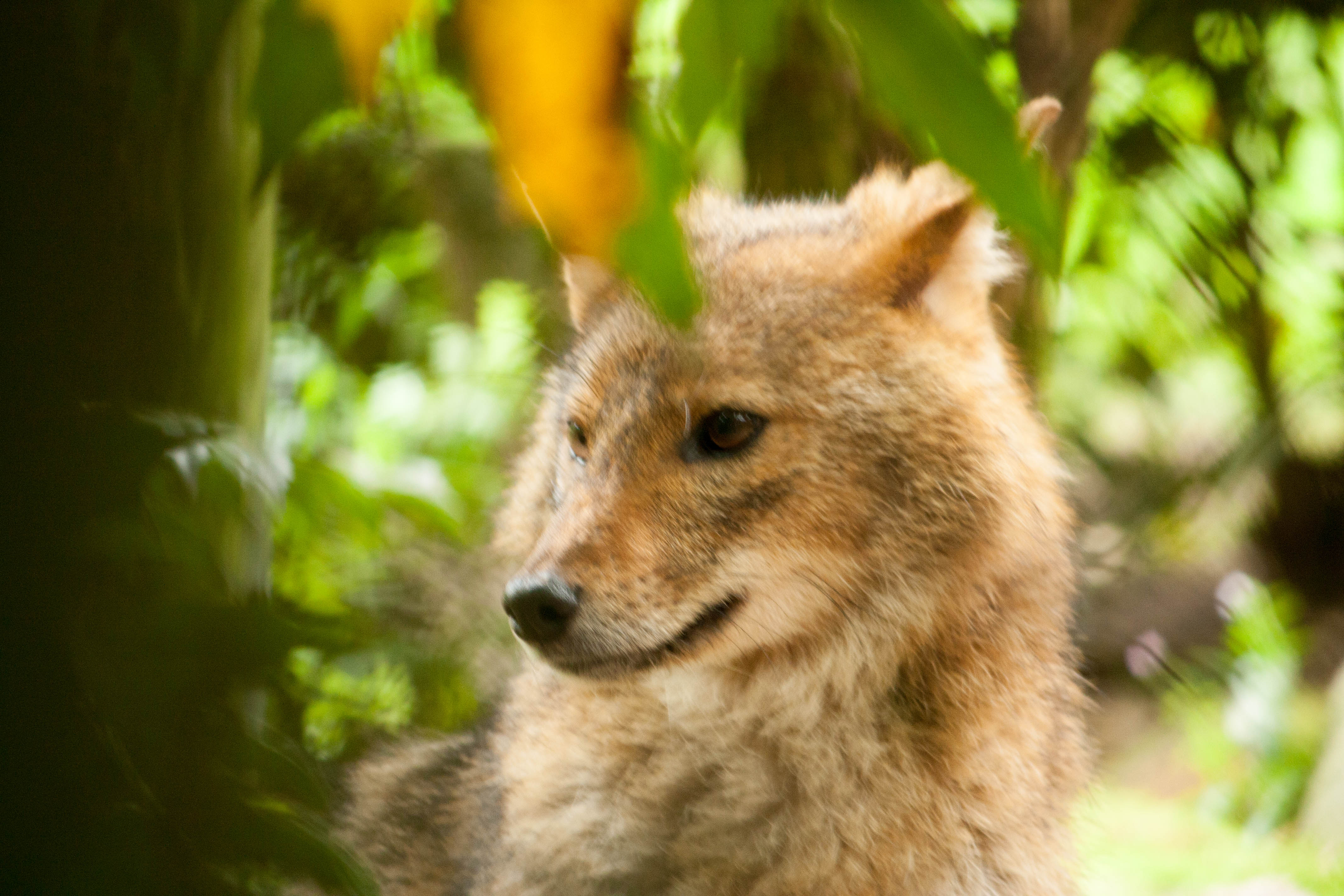
The golden jackal is present in the region.

The biodiversity of the local oceanic fauna is not well understood. Sea turtles, seals, and dolphins are considered to reside in the park area, although sufficient regularity of occurrences is unclear. Three primary species of sea turtles are to be found along the pristine beaches of the park such as the loggerhead sea turtle, green sea turtle and leatherback sea turtle. Dolphins such as the short-beaked common dolphin, common bottlenose dolphin and the endangered sperm whale has been reported in the waters of the park. Outstanding is the mediterranean monk seal, one of the most endangered mammals in the world, mostly seek refuge in the inaccessible caves and canyons of the park.

The marine area is characterised by exceptionally rich and varied flora. The coasts along Karaburun and Sazan are rocky with significant calcareous limestone cliffs, properly covered with Mediterranean maquis with a dominance of lentisk, kermes oak and Phoenicean juniper. The western coasts of are incised by caves and canyons and characterized by high vertical cliffs that appear underwater at great depths. The cliffs are mostly dotted by sea fennel, statice and caper bush. Moreover, Mediterranean tapeweed hosts macrofauna such as sponges, cnidarias, bryozoas, molluscas and many countless others.

== Attractions ==
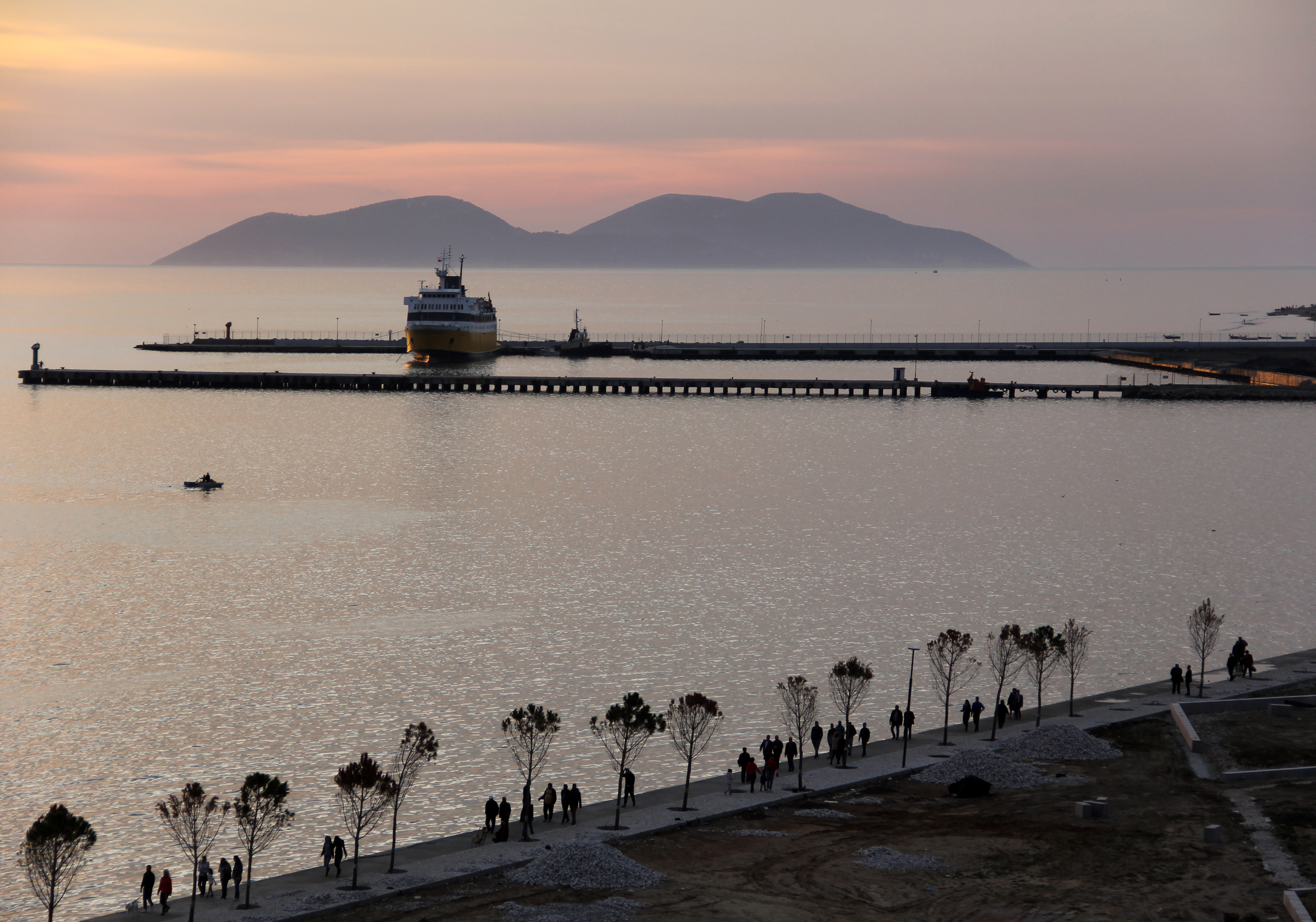
Island of Sazan

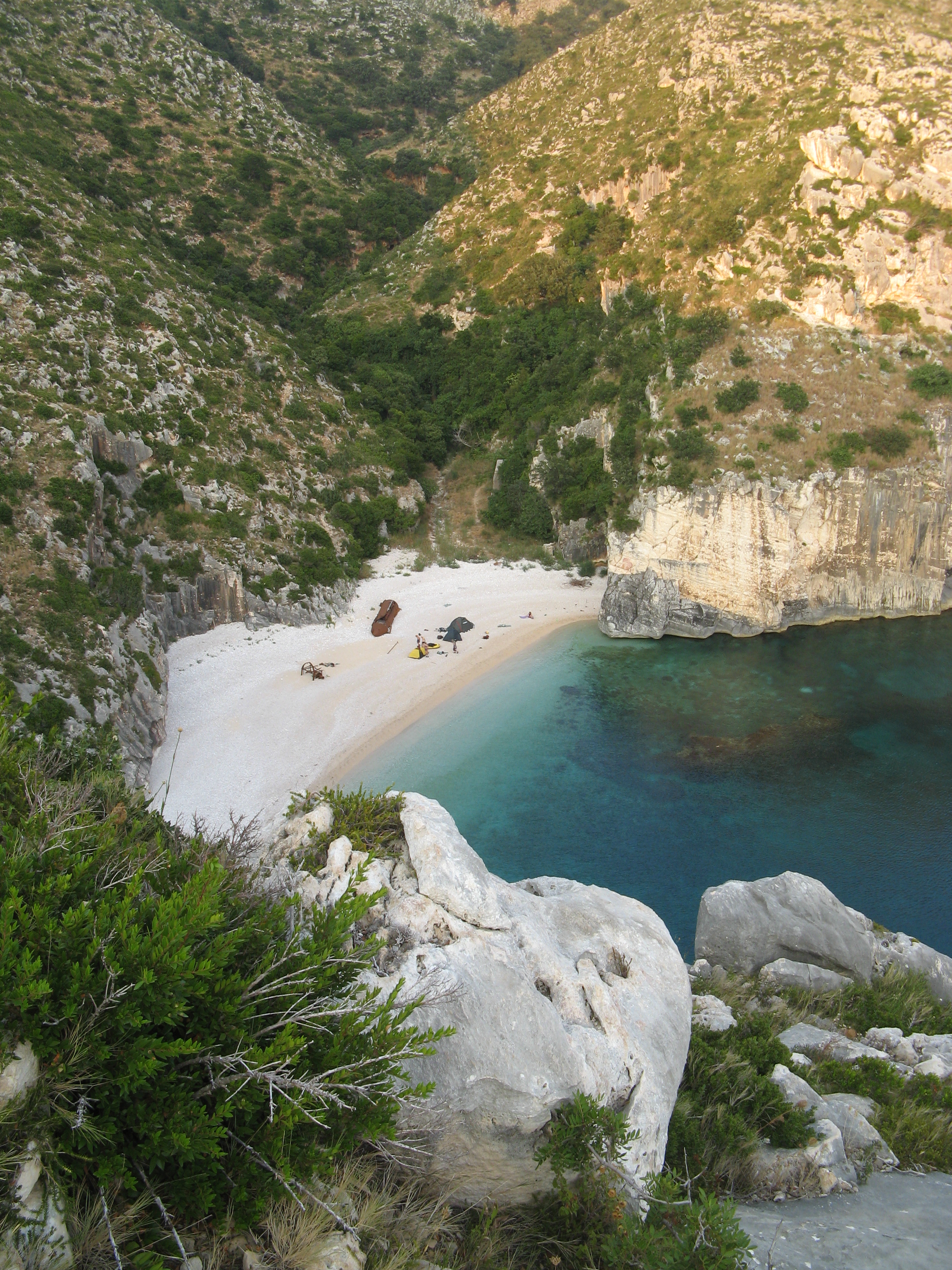
Bay of Grama

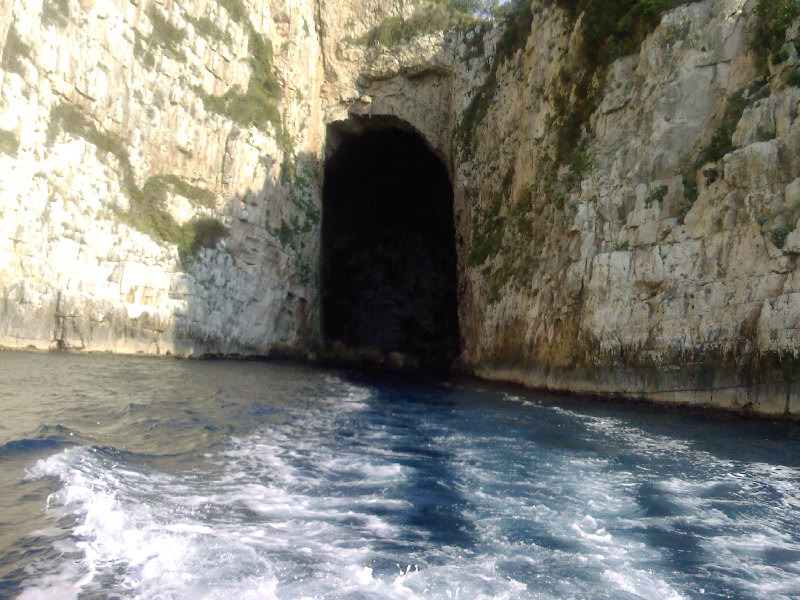
Cave of Haxhi Ali

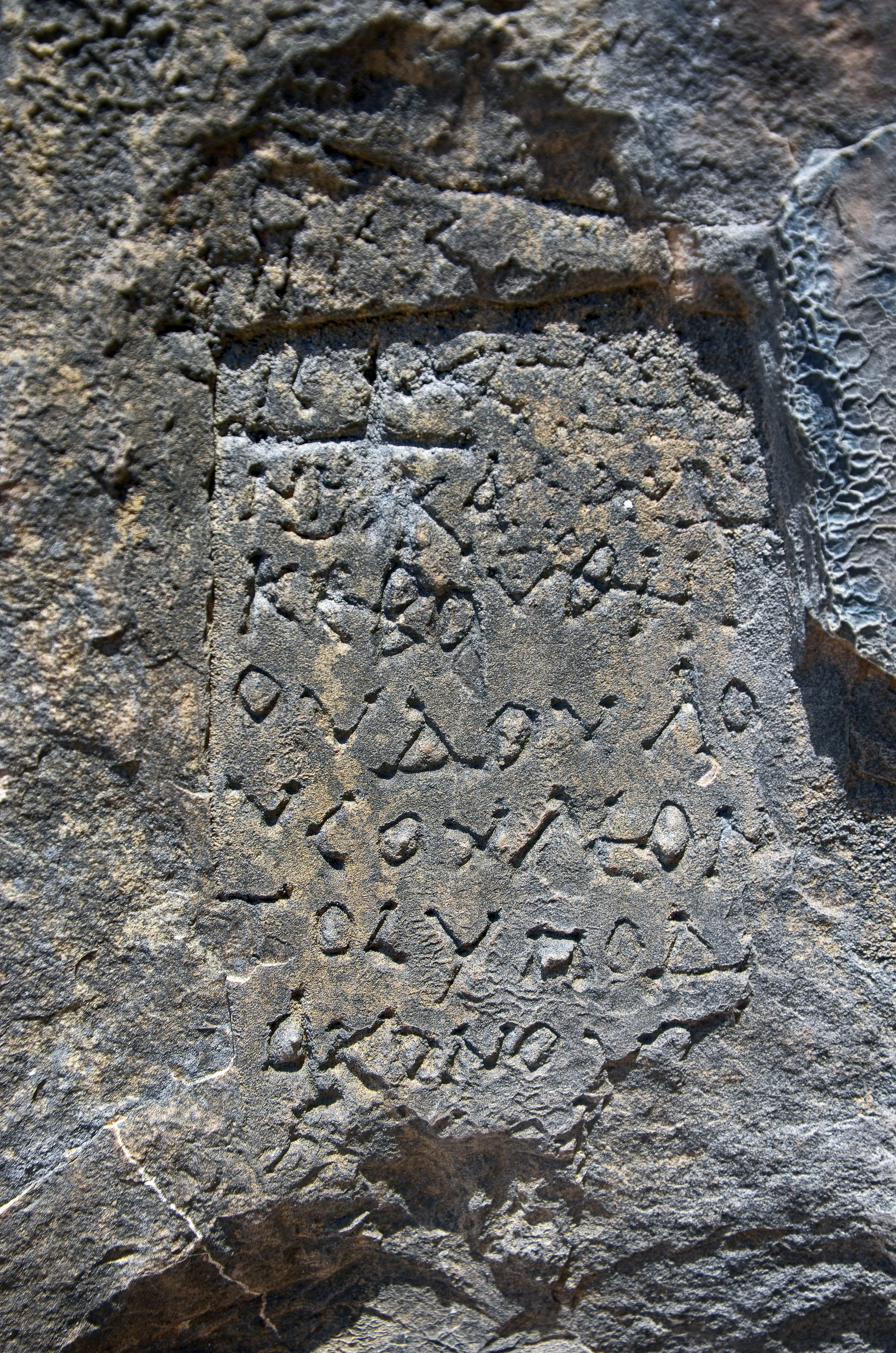
Rock inscriptions of the Bay of Grama

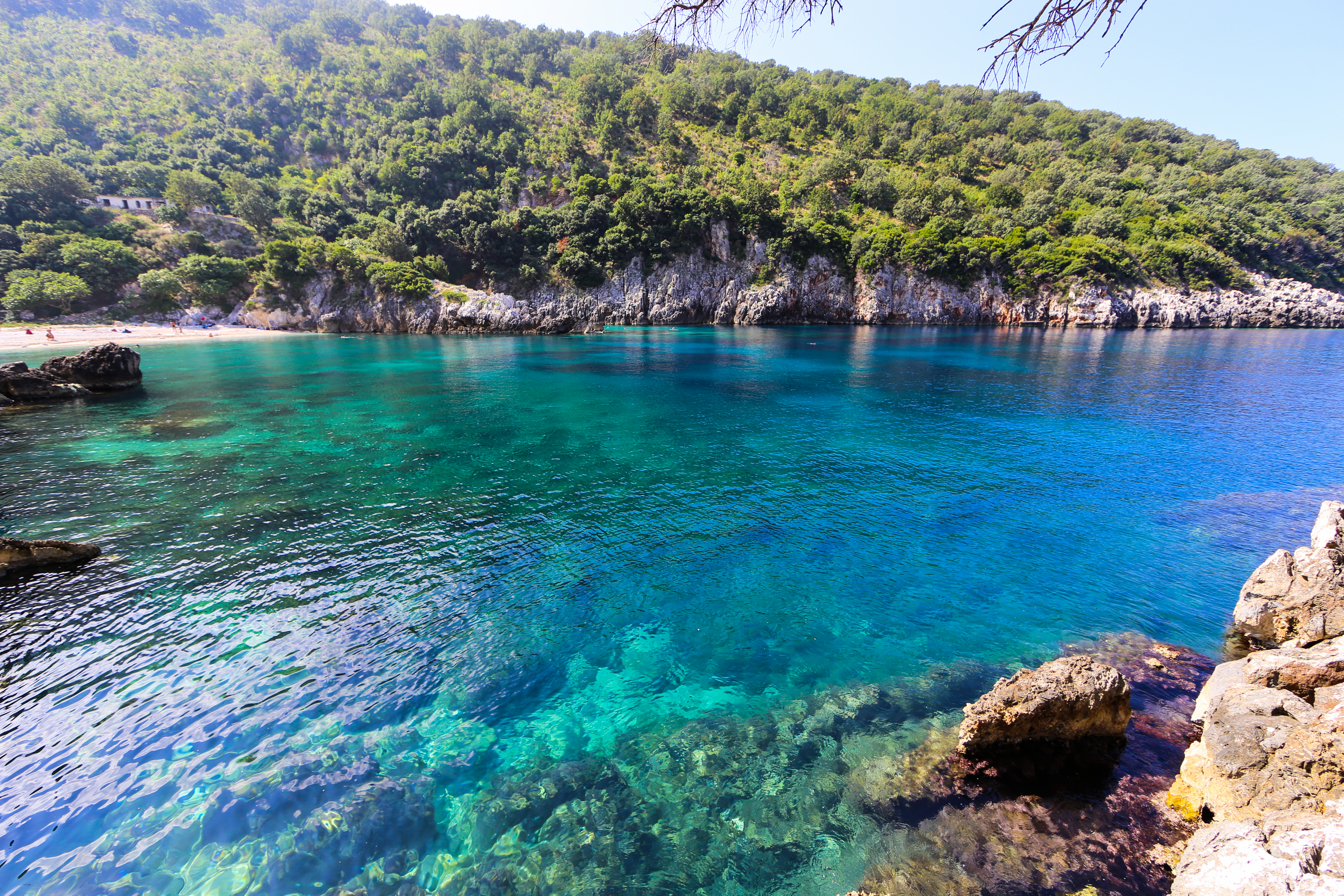
Bay of Brisani

== Sazan Island development controversy ==
In 2025, the Albanian government approved an investment project by American businessman Jared Kushner, son-in-law of U.S. President Donald Trump, to develop a luxury tourist resort on Sazan Island and in the Vjosa–Narta Lagoon area. According to Albanian Prime Minister Edi Rama, the project would be "transformational" for the former communist country as it seeks to develop a high-end tourism sector and continue its path toward membership in the European Union. The project has drawn strong criticism from environmental organizations and sections of the public over its potential impact on protected natural areas. In 2026, large-scale protests were held in Tirana and southern Albania against the development, with demonstrators calling for the project to be halted and for the government's decisions to be reconsidered.

== See also ==
- Geography of Albania
- Protected areas of Albania
- Albanian Riviera & Albanian Ionian Sea Coast
- Rock inscriptions of Grama Bay
- Haxhi Ali Cave
