= Hadji Alia =

Albanian pirate lord

Hadji Alia or Haxhi Alia
- Born: c. 1569; Ulcinj
- Died: 1625; Karaburun
- Piratical career
- Nickname: Haxhi Aliu Ulqinaku
- Type: Pirate
- Allegiance: None
- Years active: 1589–1625
- Rank: Captain
- Base of operations: Adriatic Sea

Hadji Alia or Haxhi Aliu Ulqinaku (c. 1569–1625) was an Albanian pirate lord from Ulcinj. Born in Ulcinj,(today Montenegro) , to an Albanian Family from calabria. He was known as one of the most legendary pirates of the Mediterranean Sea.

== Piracy ==
Between the years of 1587 to 1593, Alia finished his military education in the Ottoman Empire. He continued to study in Istanbul from 1594 to 1597. Later he served the Ottoman fleet and between 1609 and 1624 he moved to live with his two sons and other Albanian sailors in the Karaburun Peninsula. During his sailing, he fought the French and Venetian fleets who seemed to control the Mediterranean. Haxhi Ali cooperated with many captains against foreign pirate attacks.

The forests of Karaburun supplied Ali Hoxha with materials needed for the sea faring. According to folklore, Haxhi Alia roamed the coasts of Northern Africa and Misir of Spain.

In the summer of 1623, outside of Otranto, Haxhi Alia collided with the ships of Venice and England. They aimed to wipe out all the pirates from the Mediterranean. Though they outnumbered him with powerful ships, Alia resisted and they could not break it or capture him. These battles made Alia a legend in Ulcinj and Tivar and he helped poor peasants financially so they could marry their daughters making him very popular.

In the summer of 1625, Alis shepherds had gone out in the mountains and Karaburun was left empty when Alia was out in the seas. When he returned he encountered several ships which attacked him. Alia broke through the siege and docked his ship. The battle continued on land where Alia was killed on the Frëngu Peak (Albanian: Maja e Frëngut). When the shepherds returned, they mourned Alias death. Local peasants in the village sang heroic songs

== Legacy ==
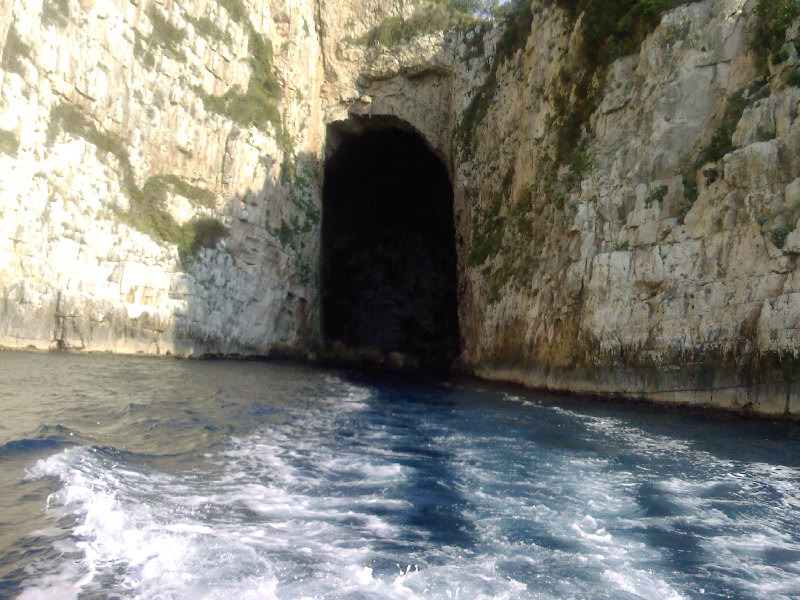
Cave of Haxhi Ali near Vlorë, Albania

A karst cave in Albania where Alia is said to have taken shelter is known as the cave of Haxhi Alia.

== See also ==
- Albanian piracy
