= Cave of Haxhi Ali =

Cave in southern Albania

- IUCN category III (natural monument or feature)
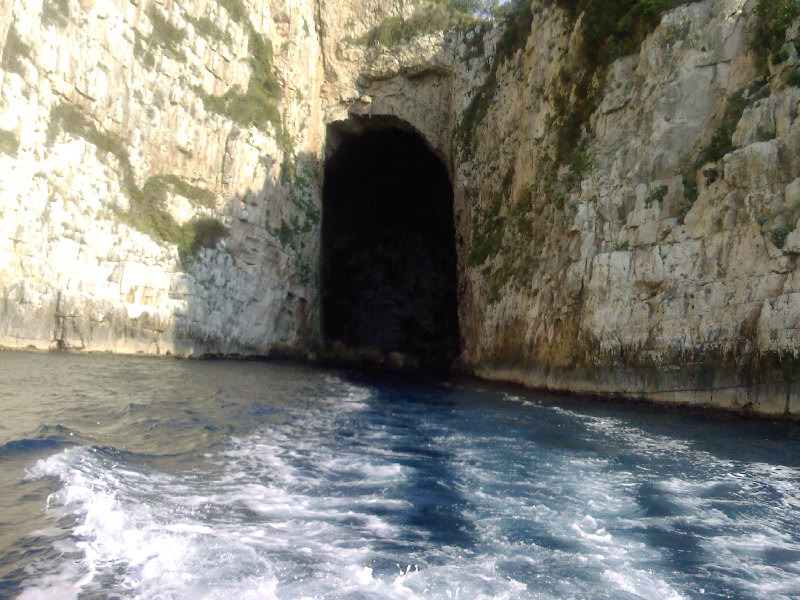
- Cave of Haxhi Ali
- Interactive map of Cave of Haxhi Ali
- Location: Vlorë County
- Nearest city: Vlorë
- Coordinates: 40°26′0.12″N 19°18′0″E
- Designation: Natural Monument
- Governing body: Ministry of Tourism and Environment

The Cave of Haxhi Ali (Albanian: Shpella e Haxhi Aliut or Shpella e Ilirëve) is a karst cave located in the limestone cliffs of the Karaburun Peninsula in southwestern Albania, near the Cape of Gjuhëz in Vlorë County. The cave measures approximately 30 meters (98 ft.) in length, with a variable width between 10 and 12 meters (33-39 ft.), and a height off about 18 meters (59 ft.)

The cave is named after Haxhi Ali, a historical figure described as an Albanian sailor and warrior from Ulcinj, who is said to have sought refuge there with his son. Archaeological discoveries within the cave, including artifacts associated with ancient trade and travel, suggest that it was used historically by traders and travelers.

The cave is situated along the Albanian Riviera and is accessible only by boat due to its location along the rugged coastline of the Karaburun Peninsula. Boat tours to the cave typically depart from the city of Vlorë. It is part of the Karaburun-Sazan Marine Park and has been designated a Natural Monument of National Importance by Albania's Ministry of Tourism and Environment, reflecting its geological and cultural significance.

== See also ==
- Geography of Albania
- Protected areas of Albania
- Karaburun-Sazan Marine Park
- Albanian piracy
