= Albanian Hydrographic Service =

- Shërbimi Hidrografik Shqiptar
- Official logo

Government agency overview
- Formed: 25 September 1957 (68 years ago)
- Jurisdiction: Council of Ministers
- Headquarters: Durrës, Albania
- Employees: 31
- Minister responsible: Pirro Vengu, Ministry of Defence
- Government agency executive: Artan Malo, Captain 2nd rank

The Albanian Hydrographic Service (Albanian: Shërbimi Hidrografik Shqiptar – SHHSH) is a state-owned scientific and technical institution of the Naval Forces of the Republic of Albania which directs, organizes and processes the publication of naval, yearbook, navigational and lantern maps.

The service conducts hydrographic and hydrological studies of the recent sea relief and the placement of sea lanterns and marine cables. It publishes and supplies the necessary naval documentation to all Albanian vessels, such as warships, transport ships, fishing and tourism boats.

== Overview ==
With the formation of the Naval Combat Fleet (FLD) on 15.8.1945, the navigation security section was also created, which at first dealt with the readiness of naval beacons and the provision of instructions for navigation at sea. The growth of FLD expanded with the Commercial and Fishing Fleet, completed with staff and equipped with the necessary tools, which on 25.9.1957 established the Hydrographic Service of the FLD. The Service follows maritime changes along the coast, compiles nautical charts, maintains and places nautical beacons and other nautical signs on land and at sea, administers and equips ships with nautical charts and navigation guides, etc. It maintains 74 lighthouses, of which 47 are on land and 27 at sea.

In 2015, SHHSH began collaboration with the Norwegian Hydrographic Service (ALNO-HIP) in a project that focused on performing bathymetric surveys, data processing, management and production of electronic marine charts.

The Albanian Hydrographic Service became the 98th member of the International Hydrographic Organization on 17 May 2022.

== See also ==
- List of lighthouses in Albania
