= Kepi i Gjuhëzës =

Cape in Albania

Cape of Gjuhëza Kepi i Gjuhëzës
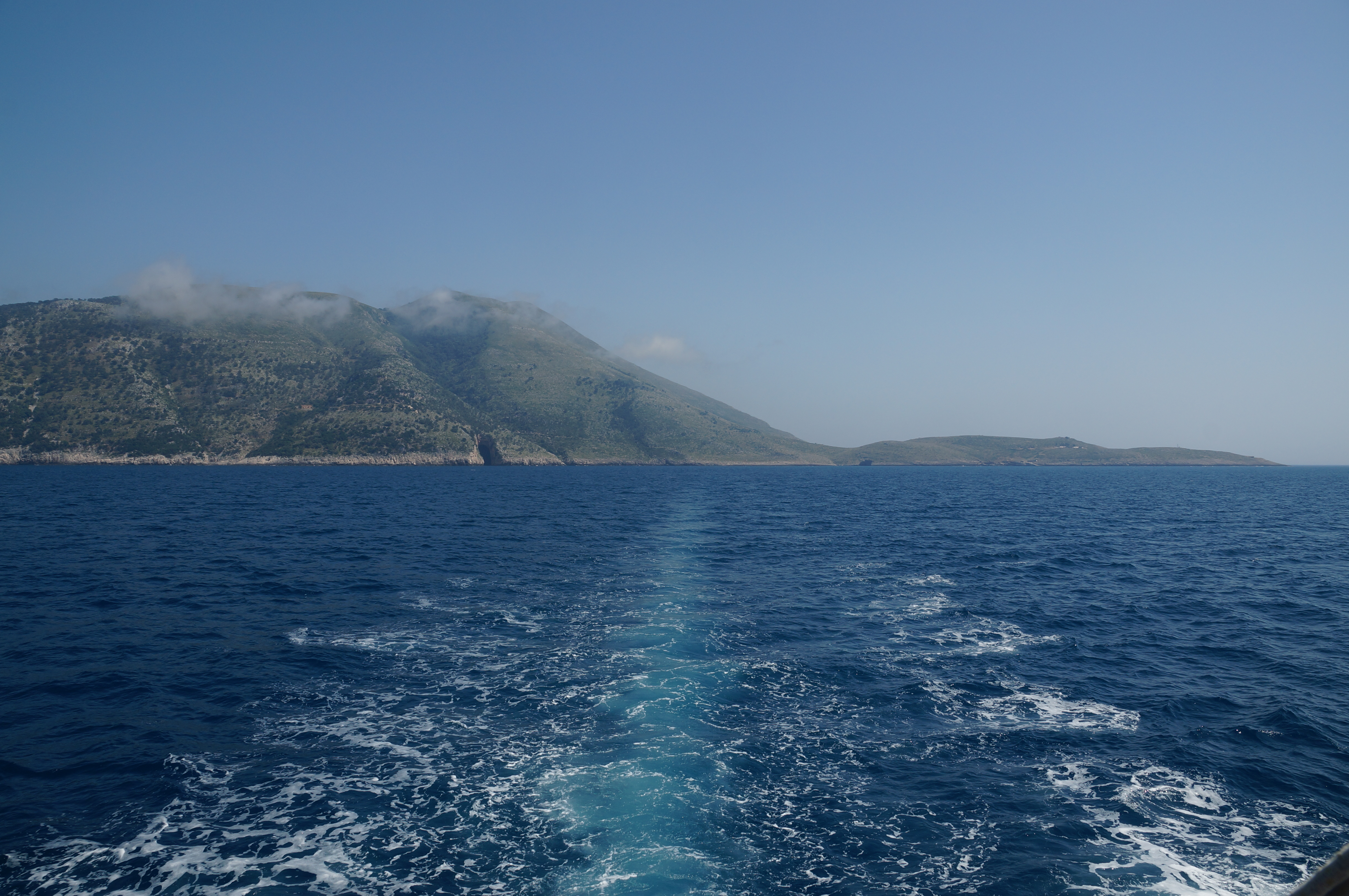
- Karaburun Peninsula from the North with Cape of Gjuhëz on the right side
- Location: Kepi i Gjuhëzës, Albania
- Coordinates: 40°25′19″N 19°17′29″E

Tower
- Foundation: concrete bunker base
- Construction: metal lamp post
- Height: 6 m (20 ft)
- Shape: cylindrical lamp post
- Markings: white post with light
- Power source: solar power

Light
- Focal height: 58 m (190 ft)
- Range: 11 nmi (20 km; 13 mi)
- Characteristic: Fl W 6s

The Gjuhëza Cape (Albanian: Kepi i Gjuhëzës) is a rocky cape northwest of Karaburun Peninsula as well as the westernmost point of continental Albania. It projects 1.1 kilometres (0.68 mi) into the sea in the form of the tongue, thus the origin of its name. The altitudes of the cape slope gradually towards the water, whereas the southern shores form 30 to 40 metres (98 to 131 ft) high steep cliffs that fall directly to the Ionian Sea. The cape lacks vegetation, while limestone rocks, highly eroded by Karst are spread over whole the area.

== See also ==
- List of lighthouses in Albania
