= List of lighthouses in Albania =

The first light navigational structure in Albania was built in the north-western side of Sazan Island in 1871. More than a decade later, in 1884, a second structure was erected in Shëngjin. Between the years 1878 to 1890, maritime experts from the Austro-Hungarian Empire drafted the first hydrographic maps in the country which were further improved by Italian experts during the period from 1933 to 1941. They planted new light navigational structures at the main entry points of the coast, in places such as: Durrës, Vlorë and Sarandë (Çukë). After the war, some major headlights were repaired and in collaboration with Soviet maritime specialists, new maps were published for the entire coast and marine region.

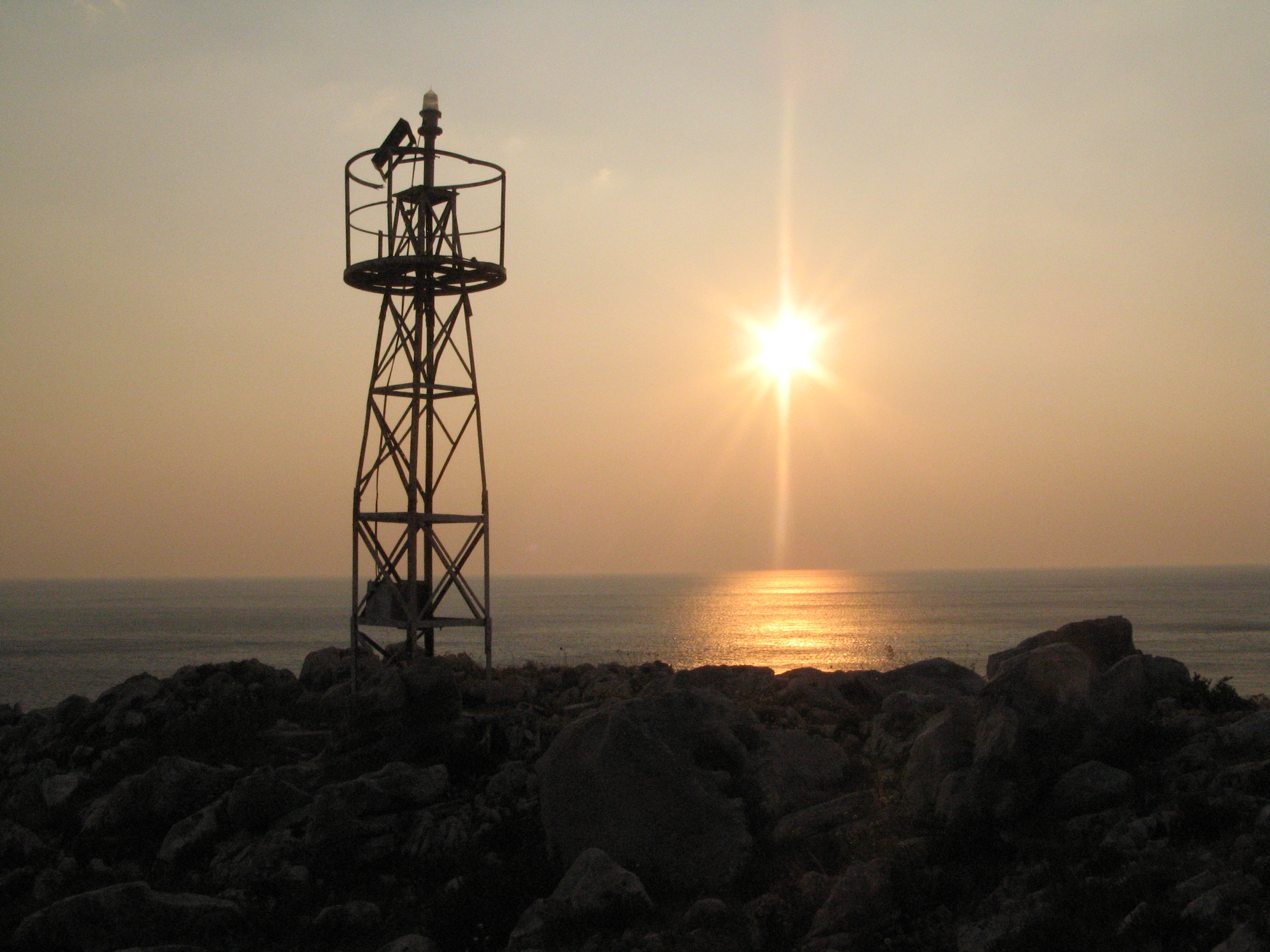
Light tower near Grama Bay

Lanterns powered by acetylene gas were put into operation and some of the older lanterns were refurbished with new parts. From 1958 to 1960, concrete and stone lantern towers of 8–14 m in height were built in the Cape of Panorma, south of the island of Sazan, in Shën Vasil, Pashaliman, Treport, Selita Cape, atop the Durrës Mountain, etc. From 1984 to 1986, two new beacon towers were built with the architecture of the time, one at the mouth of Vjosa River (20 m) and the other at Pali Cape (14 m). After 1985, some lamps were fitted with automatic electronic equipment, which increased their vision and reduced electricity consumption by 40%. At this time, more than 40 marine lanterns were numbered on the Albanian coast, covering the coastal waters at a range of 6 to 13 nautical miles, and in some capes up to 25 nautical miles. Presently there are a total of 84, mostly functional, lanterns from Buna to Saranda in full alert.

== Lighthouses, buoys, maritime navigational marks ==
This table shows a complete list of lighthouses, buoys and other navigational marks spread throughout the coast of Albania.

No.	Name	Coordinates	Class of Light	Range nml	Light Color	Type	Elevation	
No.	Name	$\phi$ north $\lambda$ east	Class of Light	Range nml	Light Color	Type	Ground level	Sea level
Shëngjin-Talë Region
1	Shëngjin lighthouse	41°48′38″N 19°34′59″E	Fl. W 5s	12		Inox pipe 2m atop military structure.	11 m	32 m
2	Red lighthouse at the entrance of Shëngjin port (left)	41°48′26″N 19°35′13″E	Fl. R 5s	4		White concrete tower with a red open deck standing on a scaled base.	6 m	11.5 m
3	Temporary green trellis at the entrance of Shëngjin port (right)	41°48′32″N 19°35′18″E	Fl. G 5s	4		Metal trellis standing on a scaled base.	4 m	6 m
4	Shëngjin with course 1	Non-functional (turned off until the redefining of the channel)						
5	Shëngjin with course 2	Non-functional (turned off until the redefining of the channel)						
6	Buoy no.0	Non-functional (removed until the redefining of the channel) Buoy no.0: open waters; Buoys no.1-4: entry channel						
7	Buoy no.1	Non-functional (removed until the redefining of the channel) Buoy no.0: open waters; Buoys no.1-4: entry channel						
8	Buoy no.2	Non-functional (removed until the redefining of the channel) Buoy no.0: open waters; Buoys no.1-4: entry channel						
9	Buoy no.3	Non-functional (removed until the redefining of the channel) Buoy no.0: open waters; Buoys no.1-4: entry channel						
10	Buoy no.4	Non-functional (removed until the redefining of the channel) Buoy no.0: open waters; Buoys no.1-4: entry channel						
11	Talë trellis	41°42′37″N 19°35′13″E	Fl. W 6s	6		White steel trellis 2 m above the Hidrovori.	9 m	10 m
Durrës-Karavasta Region
12	Rodoni Cape lighthouse	41°35′14″N 19°26′42″E	Fl.(2) W 10s	9		Inox pipe atop the cape.	3.5 m	44.5 m
13	Rodoni buoy	41°35′25″N 19°26′30″E	Fl.(9) W 15s	6		Cardinal western buoy.	–	3 m
14	Pali Cape lighthouse	41°24′48″N 19°23′30″E	Fl. W 10s	10		Concrete square tower.	11 m	34.5 m
15	Pali Cape channel buoy (left)	41°24′56″N 19°24′08″E	Fl. R 2s	3		Lateral red buoy.	–	3 m
16	Pali Cape channel buoy (right)	41°25′01″N 19°24′04″E	Fl. G 2s	3		Lateral green buoy.	–	3 m
17	Pali Cape covered trellis 1	41°24′38″N 19°23′45″E	Fl. W 2.5s	4		Course light steel trellis.	6 m	9 m
18	Pali Cape covered trellis 2	41°24′36″N 19°23′43″E	Fl. W 6s	4		Inox pipe.	1.7 m	10 m
19	Romano Port buoy (open waters)	41°22′42″N 19°23′12″E	–	2.5		Red buoy.	–	1.5 m
20	Romano Port side buoy (entrance)	41°22′43″N 19°24′18″E	–	4		Red buoy.	–	2.5 m
21	Romano Port green lighthouse (entrance)	41°22′36″N 19°24′18″E	–	4		Inox pipe standing on a scaled base.	2 m	6 m
22	Durrës lighthouse (Vila)	41°18′56″N 19°26′07″E	Fl.(2) 10s	20		Octagonal decorative stone tower.	14 m	126 m
23	Durrës Port red lighthouse (left entrance)	41°18′09″N 19°27′20″E	Fl. R 5s	6		Red plastic tower.	4 m	8 m
24	Durrës Port green lighthouse (right entrance)	41°18′15.5″N 19°27′24.2″E	Fl. G 5s	6		Green plastic tower.	4 m	8 m
25	Durrës Channel directional sign	41°18′49.97″N 19°27′57.83″E	Iso. WRG 2s	5-7-5		Xingaro pole.	5 m	7 m
26	Durrës Channel buoy no.0 (open waters)	41°15′54″N 19°26′45″E	LFI W 10s	–		Buoy with red and white light.	–	4 m
27	Durrës Channel buoy no.1 (entrance)	41°16′37″N 19°27′12″E	Fl. G 3s	3		Lateral right buoy with green light.	–	4 m
28	Durrës Channel buoy no.2 (entrance)	41°16′42″N 19°27′00″E	Fl. R 3s	3		Lateral left buoy with red light.	–	4 m
29	Durrës Channel buoy no.3 (entrance)	41°17′06″N 19°27′22″E	Fl.(2) G 6s	3		Lateral right buoy with green light.	–	4 m
30	Durrës Channel buoy no.4 (entrance)	41°17′12″N 19°27′12″E	Fl.(2) R 6s	3		Lateral left buoy with red light.	–	4 m
31	Durrës Channel buoy no.5 (entrance)	41°17′35″N 19°27′36″E	Fl.(3) G 9s	3		Lateral right buoy with green light.	–	4 m
32	Durrës Channel buoy no.6 (entrance)	41°17′38″N 19°27′25.6″E	Fl.(3) R 9s	3		Lateral left buoy with red light.	–	4 m
33	Durrës Channel buoy no.7 (entrance)	41°18′07″N 19°27′41″E	Fl. G 5s	3		Lateral right buoy with green light.	–	4 m
34	Talbot cekinë buoy	41°16′42″N 19°26′48″E	Q(6)+LFIW. 15s	6		Cardinal southern buoy (with yellow and black).	–	4 m
35	Durrës cekinë buoy	41°18′18″N 19°25′12″E	Q(9)W. 15s	6		Cardinal western buoy (with yellow and black).	–	4 m
36	Closed vessel buoy	41°16′41″N 19°26′45″E	Q(6)+LFIW. 15s	–		Cardinal southern buoy (with yellow and black).	–	4 m
37	Fishing Port lighthouse (left)	41°18′03″N 19°27′07″E	Fl.(2) R 8s	3		Red metal tower.	8.5 m	10.5 m
38	Fishing Port lighthouse (right)	41°18′07″N 19°27′07″E	Fl.(2) G 8s	3		Green metal tower.	8.5 m	10.5 m
39	Cekina e Seladës 1 (northern)	41°13′12″N 19°26′30″E	Q W 1s	6		Cardinal northern buoy (yellow and black).	–	4 m
40	Cekina e Seladës 2 (western)	41°12′17″N 19°25′30″E	Q(9) W 15s	6		Cardinal western buoy (yellow and black).	–	4 m
41	Cekina e Seladës 3 (western)	41°09′41.8″N 19°25′30.3″E	Q(9) W 15s	6		Cardinal western buoy (yellow and black).	–	4 m
42	Selina lighthouse (Lagji Cape)	41°18′47″N 19°27′20″E	LFl. W 6s	11		White plastic tower.	4 m	71 m
43	Karavasta trellis (Hidrovori)	40°52′49″N 19°25′26″E	Fl. W 3s	10		Steel trellis above the Hidrovori.	12.8 m	15.8 m
Vlorë Region (Vjosë-Gramë)
44	Treportet lighthouse (Zvërnec)	40°30′44″N 19°23′45″E	Fl(2). W 8s	9		Grey octagonal concrete tower.	12 m	70 m
45	Triport Left	40°29′01″N 19°26′00″E	Fl(2). R 5s	6		Red plastic base atop a rounded concrete tower.	6 m	8 m
46	Triport Right	40°28′56″N 19°26′01″E	Fl(2). G 5s	6		Green plastic base atop a rounded concrete tower.	6 m	8 m
47	PIA, red buoy (Pair I)	40°27′53.8″N 19°26′17.2″E	Fl. R 3s	6		Side red buoy.	–	4 m
48	PIA, green buoy (Pair I)	40°27′50.3″N 19°26′20.6″E	Fl. G 3s	6		Side green buoy.	–	4 m
49	PIA, red buoy (Pair II)	40°28′13.8″N 19°26′30.8″E	Fl. R 6s	6		Side red buoy.	–	4 m
50	PIA, green buoy (Pair II)	40°28′11.8″N 19°26′35.1″E	Fl. G 6s	6		Side green buoy.	–	4 m
51	Northern wavebreakrer	40°28′14″N 19°26′25″E	Q(6)+LFIW. 15s	6		Cardinal southern buoy.	–	4 m
52	Southern wavebreaker	40°28′09.4″N 19°26′55.8″E	Q(9)W. 15s	6		Cardinal western buoy.	–	4 m
53	PIA aquarium buoy no.1	40°28′29.1″N 19°26′38.8″E	Iso. W 2s	4		Small open waters buoy (red and white).	–	1 m
54	PIA aquarium buoy no.2	40°28′14.6″N 19°26′40.7″E	Iso. W 2s	4		Small open waters buoy (red and white).	–	1 m
55	PIA aquarium buoy no.3	40°28′22″N 19°26′32.3″E	Iso. W 2s	4		Small open waters buoy (red and white).	–	1 m
56	PIA aquarium buoy no.4	40°28′21.7″N 19°26′31.6″E	Iso. W 2s	4		Small open waters buoy (red and white).	–	1 m
57	Vlorë TEC black buoy	40°28′35.2″N 19°23′35.9″E	Without lighting			Small black buoy.	–	1 m
58	Vlorë TEC red buoy	40°28′33.8″N 19°23′37.3″E	Without lighting			Small red buoy.	–	1 m
59	Vlorë Port western red lighthouse	40°26′57″N 19°28′50″E	Fl. R 3s	5		Red plastic tower atop a square concrete base.	8 m	10 m
60	Vlorë Port eastern green lighthouse	40°26′54″N 19°29′03″E	Fl. G 3s	5		Green plastic tower atop a square concrete base.	7 m	8 m
61	Kalaja lighthouse	40°24′54″N 19°28′54″E	LFl. W 10s	10		White square concrete tower.	8 m	44 m
62	Benzinato Vlorë	40°28′25″N 19°24′01″E	Fl(2)W. 6s	6		Possibly isolated.	–	4 m
63	Orikum lighthouse (Pashaliman)	40°19′41″N 19°25′11″E	Fl(2)W. 5s	8		Grey square concrete tower.	8 m	21 m
64	Shën Vasili lighthouse	40°22′33″N 19°24′16″E	Fl(3)W. 8s	8		Grey octagonal concrete tower.	6 m	55 m
65	Gallovec trellis (Shën Jan)	40°26′18″N 19°19′17″E	Fl. G 3s	4		Steel trellis atop a concrete base.	4 m	14 m
66	Gjuhëza Cape lighthouse	40°25′19″N 19°17′29″E	Fl. W 6s	11		Land beacon (bunker).	4 m	58 m
67	Grama trellis	40°12′57″N 19°28′18″E	Fl. W 6s	5		Steel trellis.	4 m	51.5 m
68	Orikum Marina (red)	Currently non-existent	Fl. R 4s	3		Side buoy.	–	4 m
69	Orikum Marina (green)	40°20′32″N 19°28′18″E	FG	3		White steel pipe.	–	5 m
Vlorë Region (Sazan Island)
70	Sazan lighthouse (northern entrance)	40°30′11″N 19°17′07″E	Fl. G 4s	4		Green plastic tower atop a concrete base.	4 m	10 m
71	Sazan lighthouse (southern entrance)	40°30′07″N 19°17′07″E	Fl. R 4s	4		Red plastic tower atop a concrete base.	4 m	10 m
72	Sazan southern lighthouse	40°28′27″N 19°17′09″E	Fl. R 3s	4		White concrete tower.	8 m	32.5 m
73	Sazan northern lighthouse	40°30′40″N 19°16′11″E	Fl(4)W. 15s	12		Inox pipe atop a bunker.	5 m	157 m
Vlorë Region (Llogara-Qefali Cape)
74	Himara lighthouse	40°05′59″N 19°44′29″E	Fl. W 3s	6		White plastic tower.	6 m	8 m
75	Panorma Cape lighthouse	40°02′58″N 19°47′40″E	Fl. W 8s	6		White square stone tower.	10 m	114 m
76	Course towards Panorma	Temporarily shut off						
77	Qefali Cape lighthouse	39°54′28″N 19°54′49″E	Fl. W 5s	20		Metal pole.	8 m	155 m
Sarandë Region (Limion-Çukë)
78	Limion (right)	39°52′32″N 19°59′21″E	Fl. G 3s	4		Green steel pole.	6 m	8 m
79	Limion (left)	39°52′21″N 19°59′18″E	Fl. R 3s	4		Red steel pole.	6 m	8 m
80	Cekina e Paladinës	39°51′50″N 20°00′05″E	Q(6)+LFIW. 15s	6		Cardinal southern plastic buoy (yellow and black).	–	4 m
81	Saranda Port	Currently non-existent						
82	Saranda Beach buoy	39°52′13″N 20°00′39″E	Fl(2)W. 6s	6		Isolated danger buoy (red and black).	–	4 m
83	Lëkurësi lighthouse	39°51′51″N 20°01′34″E	Fl(3)W. 30s	20		Concrete tower covered with decorative stone.	5 m	214 m
84	Bredeneshi trellis (Çukë)	39°50′44″N 20°01′30″E	Fl(4)W. 12s	6		Trellis atop concrete base.	4.5 m	37.5 m

The lantern icons displayed in the table above are precise graphical recreations of the light navigational structures found along the coastal waters of Albania. The yellow light bulb icon represents in fact color white but due to technical limitations that made it difficult to properly display a white bulb in the current table background, yellow was the closest color chosen.

== See also ==
- Lists of lighthouses and lightvessels
- Albanian Hydrographic Service
