= Karaburun Peninsula, Albania =

Peninsula on the southwest coast of Albania

Karaburun Peninsula
Albanian: Gadishulli i Karaburunit
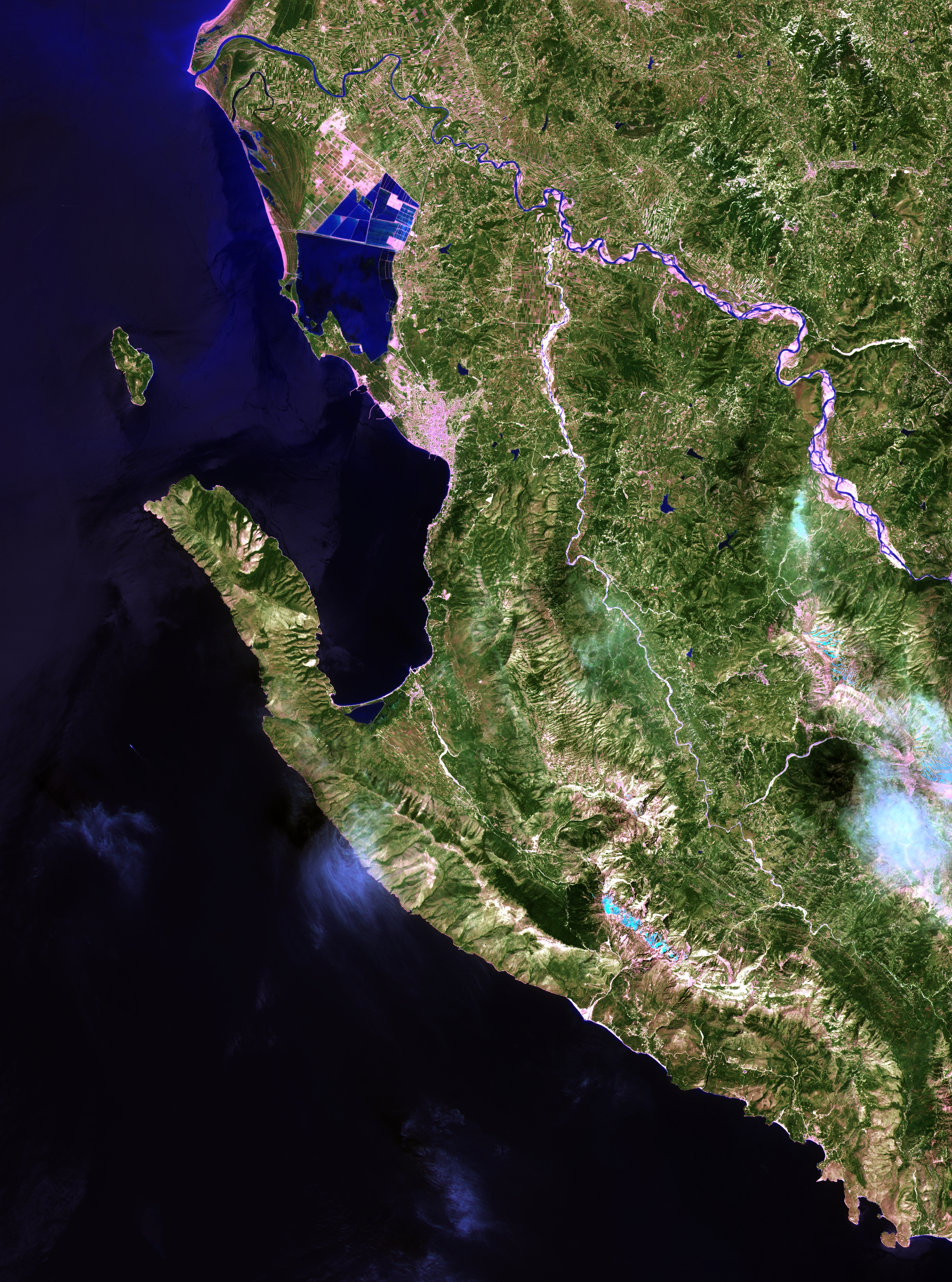
- Satellite imagery of Karaburun Peninsula
- Interactive map of Karaburun Peninsula

Geography
- Location: Vlorë County, Albania; Southern Europe
- Coordinates: 40°20′N 19°22′E
- Adjacent to: Adriatic Sea (north); Ionian Sea (south)
- Area: 62 km^{2} (24 sq mi)
- Highest point: Maja Çaderës (839 mAA)

The Karaburun Peninsula (Albanian: Gadishulli i Karaburunit, named after the Turkish term for "black cape"), also known as Cape Linguetta, is a peninsula of the Mediterranean Sea located in Southeastern Europe, which is almost completely surrounded by both the Adriatic Sea to the north and the Ionian Sea to the south. It is located in Southwestern Albania along the Albanian Ionian Sea Coast, whereas the Strait of Otranto separates it from Italy. The Strait of Mezokanal separates the peninsula from Sazan Island, while in the southeast stretches the Bay of Vlorë. In classical antiquity, its name was the "Akrokeraunian Peninsula" (Ακροκεραύνιο ακρωτήριο), whose name was derived from the eponymous Akrokeraunian mountains; this is because, in terms of geology, the Rrëza e Kanalit on the peninsula represent the continuation of said mountains, which are the highest and most extensive mountain range system that extends parallel to the Ionian Sea. Karaburun peninsula is sometimes called Ceraunian Peninsula due to the name of the mountain range. Formed during the mesozoic era of the cretaceous and paleogene period, the crests of the mountain range form a northwest-southeast line with a series of distinct peaks along its irregular structure that are broken apart by steep and unequally slopes. The highest peaks are namely, the Maja Çaderës, Maja e Flamurit, Maja e Koretës and Maja e Ilqes.

The western section comprises a rough relief and is dotted with sandy and rocky beaches, sea caves, steep cliffs and several bays amongst them Cave of Haxhi Ali, Cape of Gjuhëz, Bay of Skaloma, Bay of Arushë, Bay of Dafinë, and most notably Bay of Grama, where ships and vessels anchored during classical antiquity. On the high and steep rock faces of the bay, which served also as a marble quarry, there are hundreds of rock inscriptions dating back to the 4th century BC.

Under the Köppen climate classification, the peninsula experiences a mediterranean climate with hot summers and generally warm to cool, dry winters. The ideal climate and contrasting landscapes located at the sea have favored the development of a vast array of habitats which in turn are home to a diverse wildlife. The fauna is represented by several threatened and endangered species such as the loggerhead and green sea turtle but also the mediterranean monk seal, the rarest seal species in the world.

The landmass of the peninsula is designated as nature reserve, while the shoreline and its surrounding sea waters are part of the marine park. In 2014, the Regina Blu ferry was established by a Radhime-based hotel owner making trips between the peninsula and the island of Sazan, while stopping along the secluded beaches.

The peninsula belongs to the Sazan Zone that is a constituent of the Albanides tectonic unit. Albanides form the link between Dinarides and Hellenides orogenic belts. They are considered allochthonous and mobilist theories deduce they come from the east. These formations have been continuously under the effect of Karst and are exploited as marble (metamorphosed limestone) since antiquity. The widespread Karst topography is responsible for the absence of potable water and thus the absence of any population on the peninsula. Despite the dry surface and upper soil layers, there are several water sources that pour deep directly into the sea. The geological evolution has formed also capes such as Galloveci cape and Kepi i Gjuhëzës, as well as a total number of 20 caves along the whole coast.

== Gallery ==
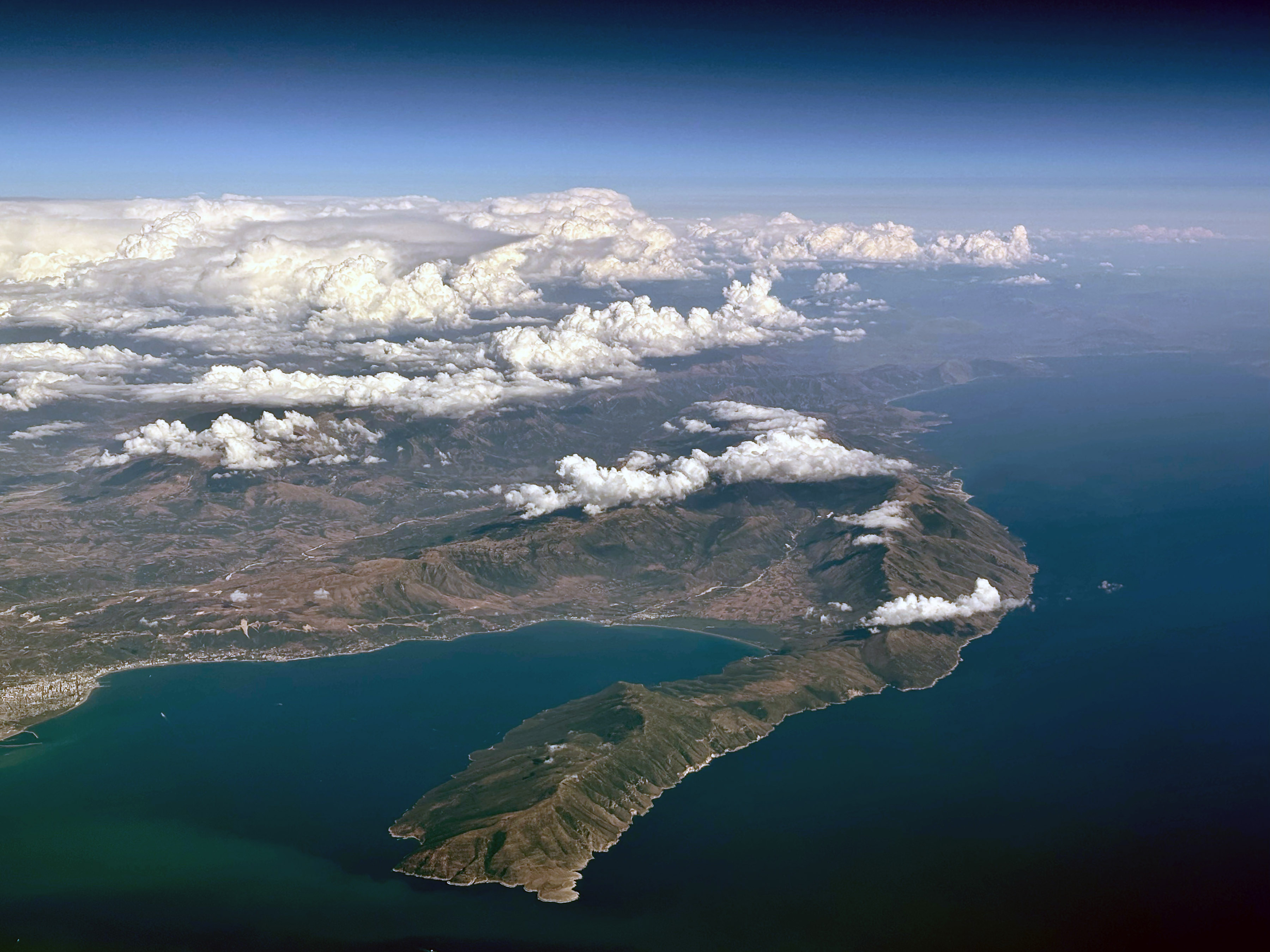
Aerial view of the peninsula

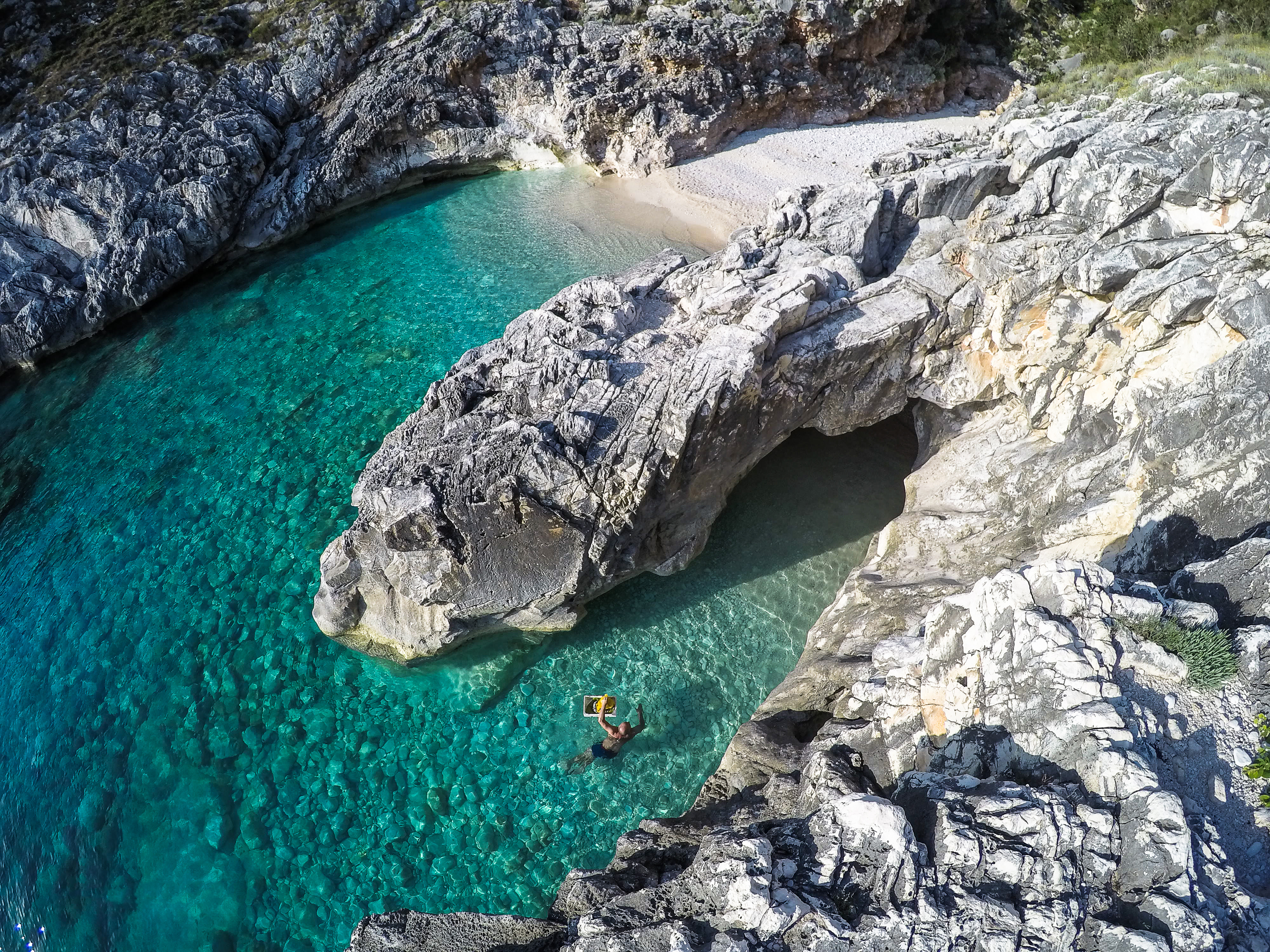
Bay of Skaloma

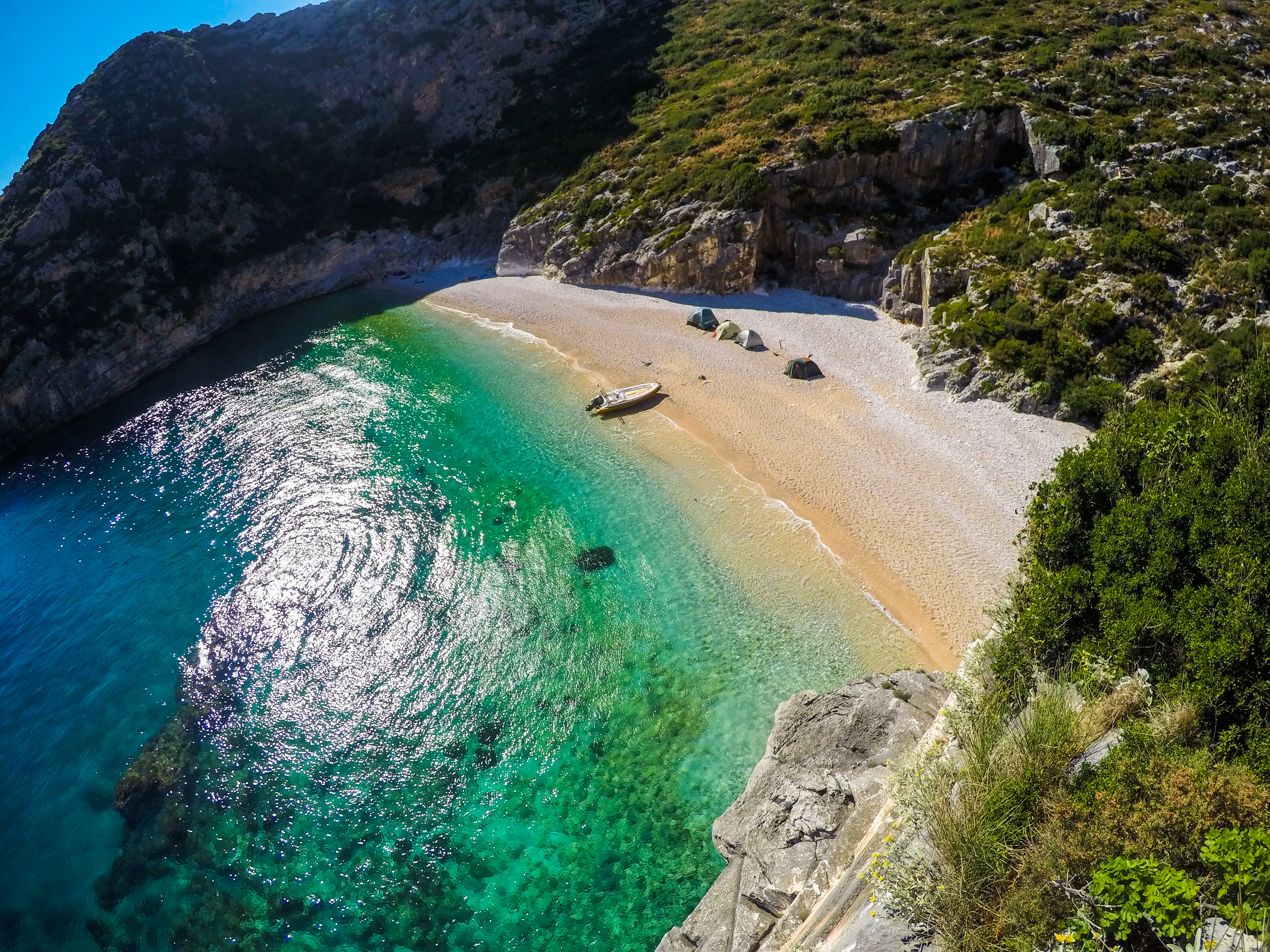
Bay of Grama

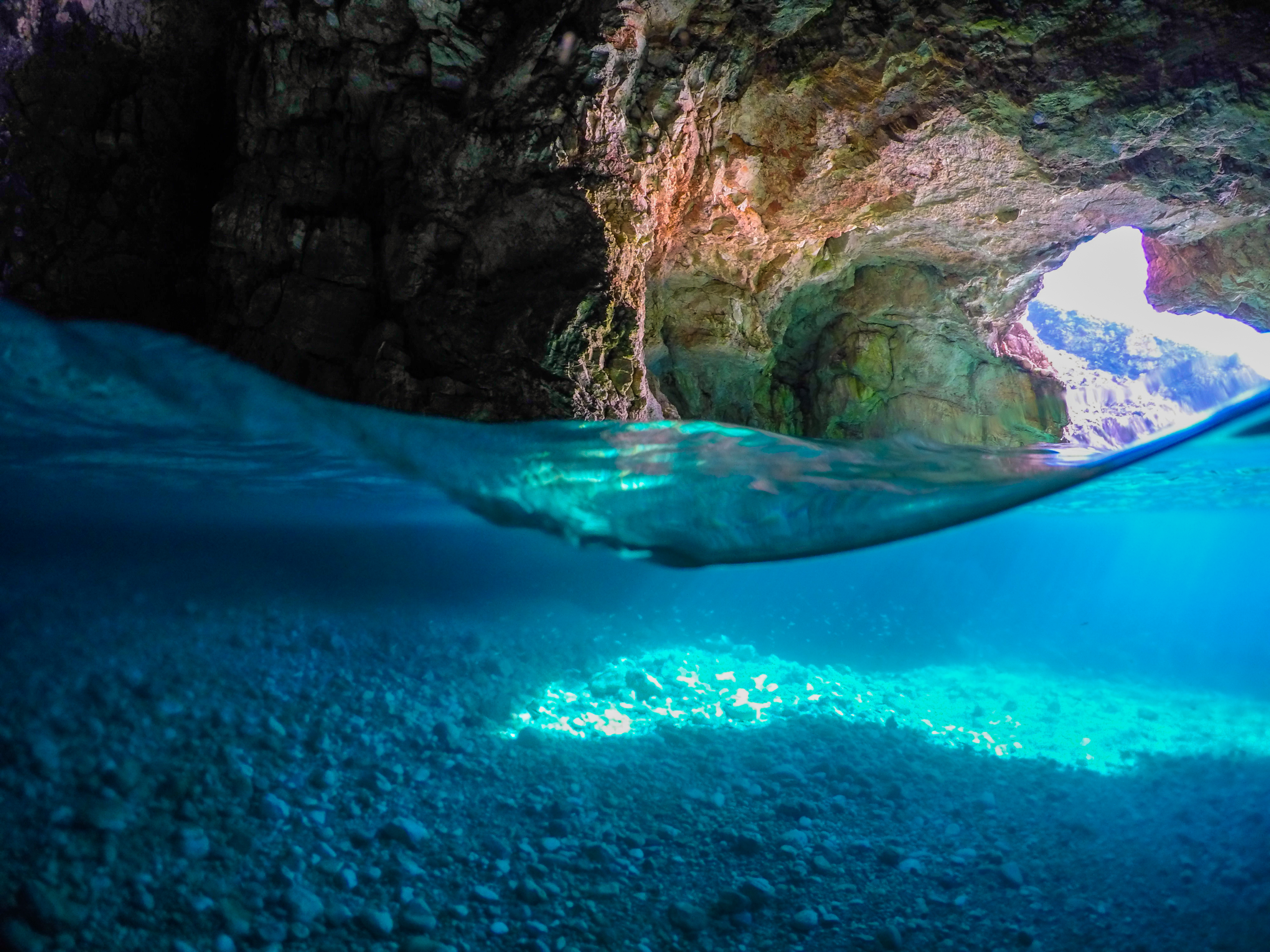
Cave of Dafinë

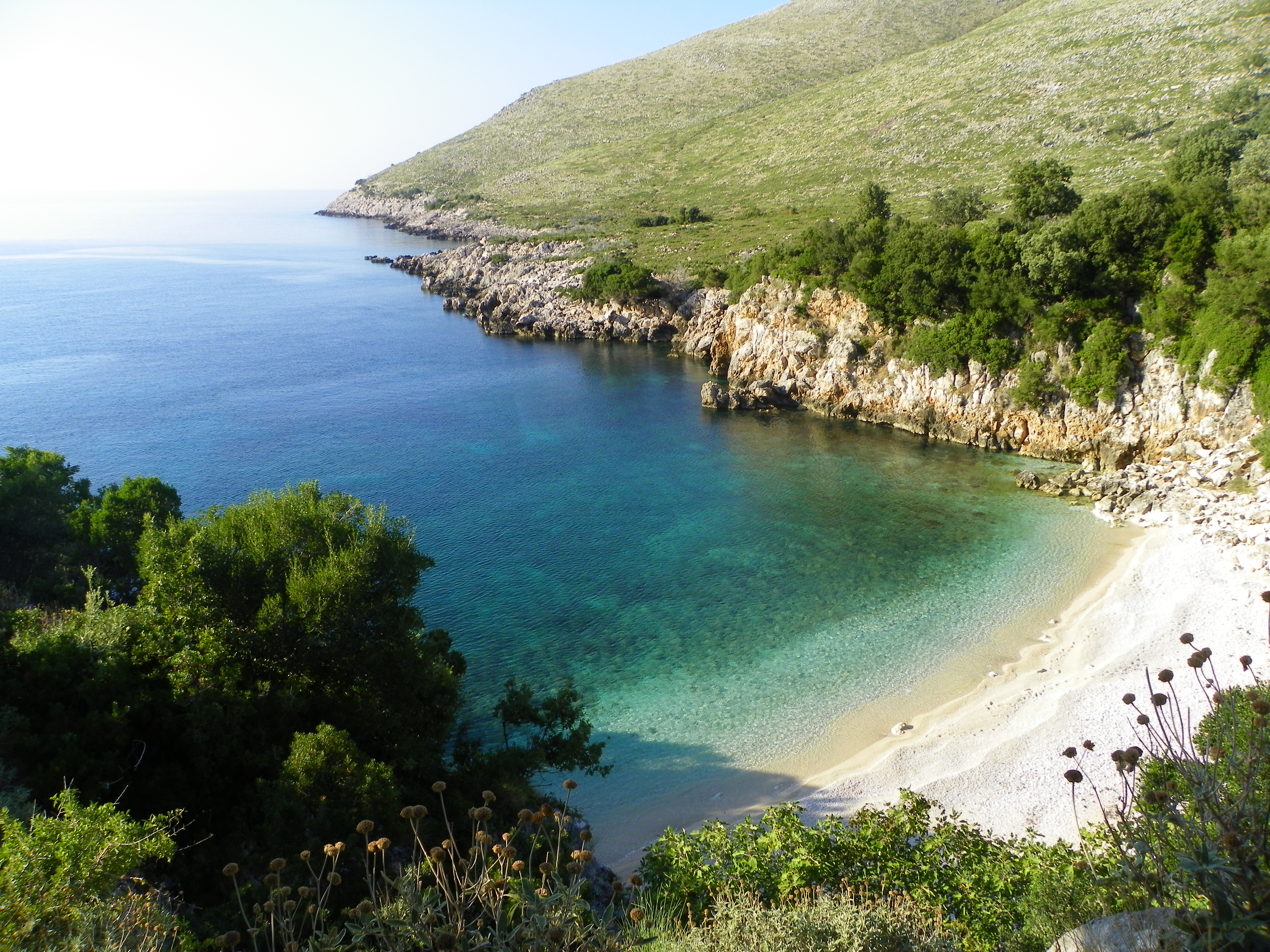
Bay of Arushë

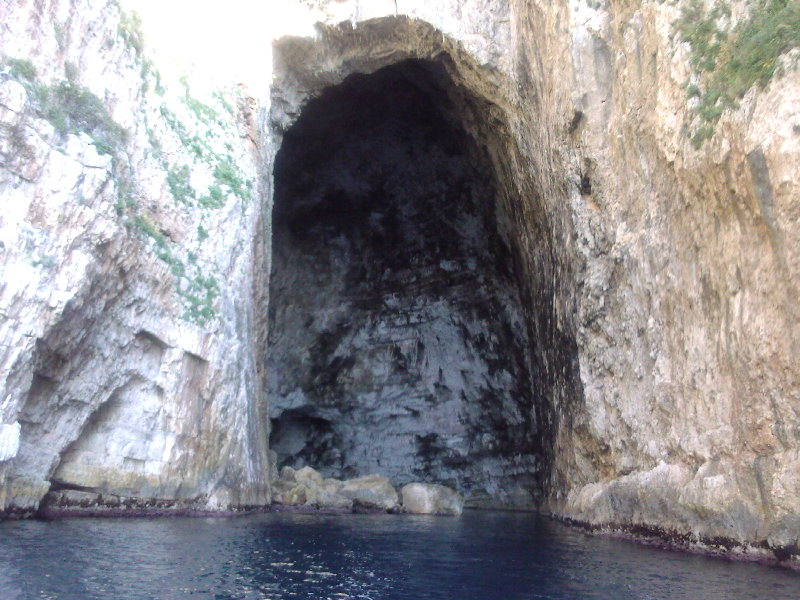
Cave of Haxhi Ali

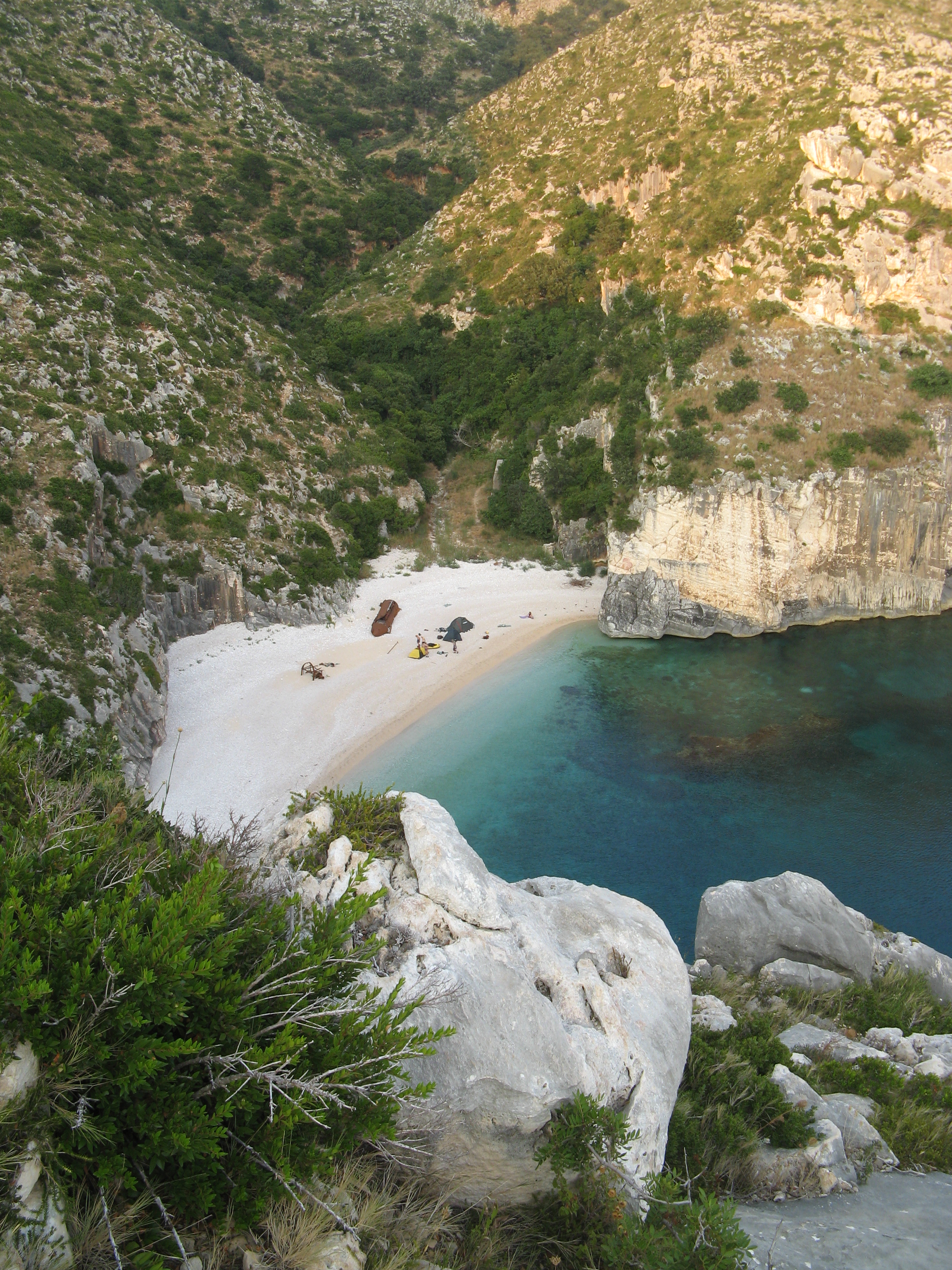
Bay of Grama

== See also ==
- Albanian Ionian Sea Coast
- Biodiversity of Albania
- Cape Lopez
- Geography of Albania
- Karaburun-Sazan National Marine Park
- Protected areas of Albania
