= Rock inscriptions of the Bay of Grama =

Archaeological site in Albania

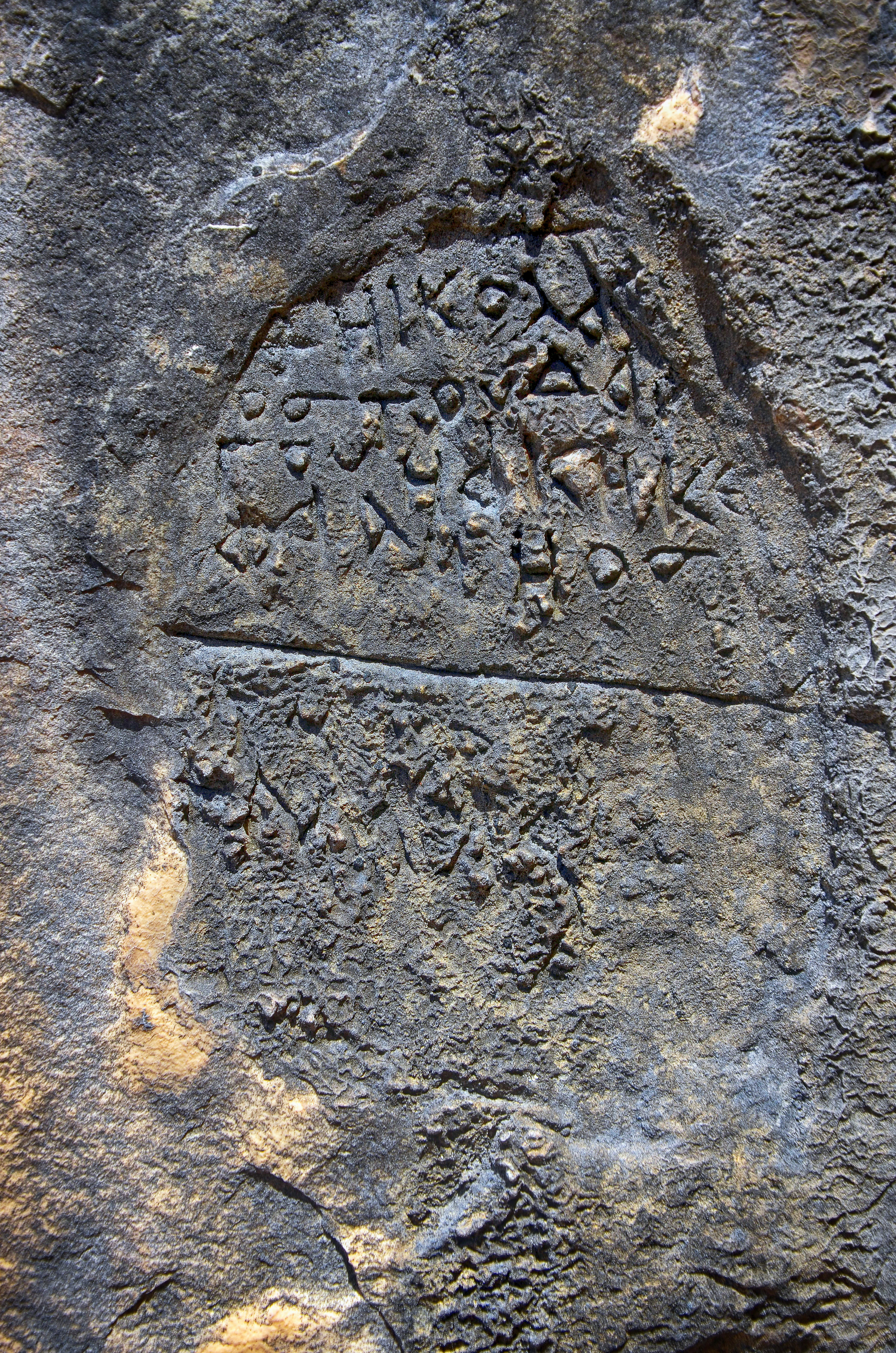
One of the antique rock inscriptions of the Grama Bay

The rock inscriptions of the Grama Bay Albanian: Mbishkrimet shkëmbore në Gjirin e Gramës) is an archaeological site in Southwestern Albania, Vlorë County, in the Grama Bay located on the Ionian coast of the Karaburun Mountains, including roughly 1,500 rock inscriptions that date from the 3rd century BC to the 15th-16th centuries. The name of the bay originates from the Greek word γράμμα meaning 'letter'.

The little bay with difficult overland access but with abundant springs had always been a favorite stopping place and shelter for the ones sailing along the coast: mariners, soldiers, merchants and pirates. The city of Oricum, located 12 km to the north, was founded in the 7th century BC, and the inhabitants started to use the Grama Bay as a quarry in the 3rd century BC from where they could extract limestone of good quality. The first inscriptions carved into the eastern rock face of the bay were made by the quarry workers themselves. During the following 2,000 years further mariners made their signs on the rock which ended up in the former quarry covered by 1,500 inscriptions. Majority is written in Ancient Greek and Latin, but inscriptions in Messapian language as well as ones made by Byzantine Greeks or Ottoman Turks are also included. These typically give the name of the people and that of their vessels and often invoke the Dioscuri. Historical figures also showed up in the Grama Bay and put their marks on the rock, such as Pompey in 48 BC or John V Palaiologos in around 1369. The Roman statesman Sulla was actually never visiting the bay, but in 86 BC after defeating Mithridates VI of Pontus during the First Mithridatic War he ordered to commemorate his triumph with a new inscription made on the Grama Bay's rocks. The medieval inscriptions call upon the Lord for his help.

Those arriving to the Grama Bay after the 15th century continued the tradition of making their own graffito, but these pieces are of less archaeological value. Most considerably one can see inscriptions made by the hands of Himariotes during the 19th-20th centuries as well as graffito of Enver Hoxha's soldiers in the second half of the 20th century.

== See also ==
- Messapian language

== Sources ==
- Neritan Ceka: The Illyrians to the Albanians. Tirana: Migjeni. 2013. pp. 322., 396., 496. ISBN 9789928407467
- Oliver Gilkes: Albania: An archaeological guide. London; New York: I. B. Tauris. 2013. pp. 203–204. ISBN 9781780760698
- Arben Hajdari, Joany Reboton, Saïmir Shpuza & Pierre Cabanes: Les inscriptions de Grammata (Albanie) Revue des Études Grecques Année 2007 120-2 pp. 353–394
