= Grama Bay =

Bay in the Ionian sea and a tourist attraction in Albania

- Gjiri i Gramës
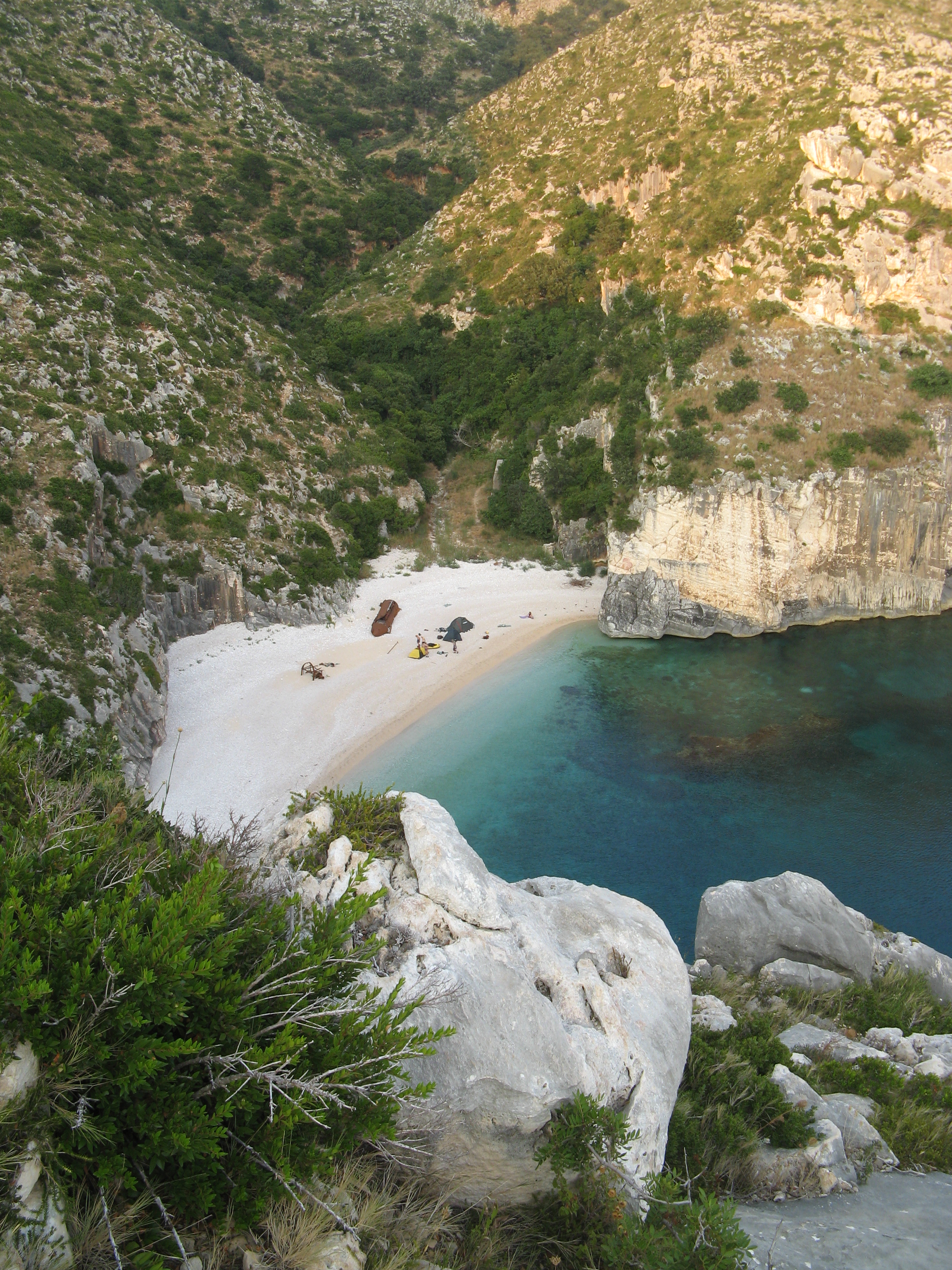
- Grama Bay

- Location within Albania
- Location: Southern Europe
- Coordinates: 40°12′56″N 19°28′24″E
- Ocean/sea sources: Ionian Sea, Mediterranean Sea
- Basin countries: Albania
- Max. width: ca. 100 m (330 ft)
- Average depth: ca. 200 m (660 ft)

Grama Bay (Albanian pronunciation: [ˈɟiːɾi i ˈgraːməs] — Albanian: Gjiri i Gramës) is a bay in the Ionian Sea along the Albanian Riviera. One of many bays of the western Ceraunian Mountains, it is primarily known as a touristic place, and for the engraved inscriptions in the surrounding coastal cliffs.

== Name ==
The name of the bay is closely associated with the engraved inscriptions in the surrounding coastal cliffs; Grama for the Greek word for 'letter'. It is also referred to as Gram(m)ata, the plural form of 'Gram(m)a' from the inscriptions of thanksgiving left by Greek, Roman and medieval sailors in honour of the Dioscuri, Castor and Pollux, and other patrons.

== Human history ==
In antiquity the bay of Grama was a cove along the Chaonian coast west of the Ceraunian Mountains. The bay is home to precious archaeological, historical and cultural values, as it served as an important harbour and shelter for those sailing along the coast during classical antiquity. On the vertical cliffs and rocks, there are numerous carved inscriptions in Ancient Greek, Latin and Medieval Greek. This kind of inscriptions were known in antiquity as euploia (Greek: ευπλοϊα) inscriptions.

During World War II, the bay was used as a base for the Special Operations Executive.

== Geomorphology ==
Representing a rocky bay, the shore is dominated by coastal cliffs, sloping vertically into the sea and rocky, pebbled beaches. It stretches within the Karaburun-Sazan Marine Park and was designated as a natural monument because of its outstanding landscape dotted with solutional and sea caves.

== Biodiversity ==
The precious landscapes of the bay are of global importance, because they contribute to the country's ecological balance and provide habitat for numerous globally threatened and endangered species. The sea caves are an exceptional ecosystem and give important refuge to the mediterranean monk seal, the rarest seal species in the world.

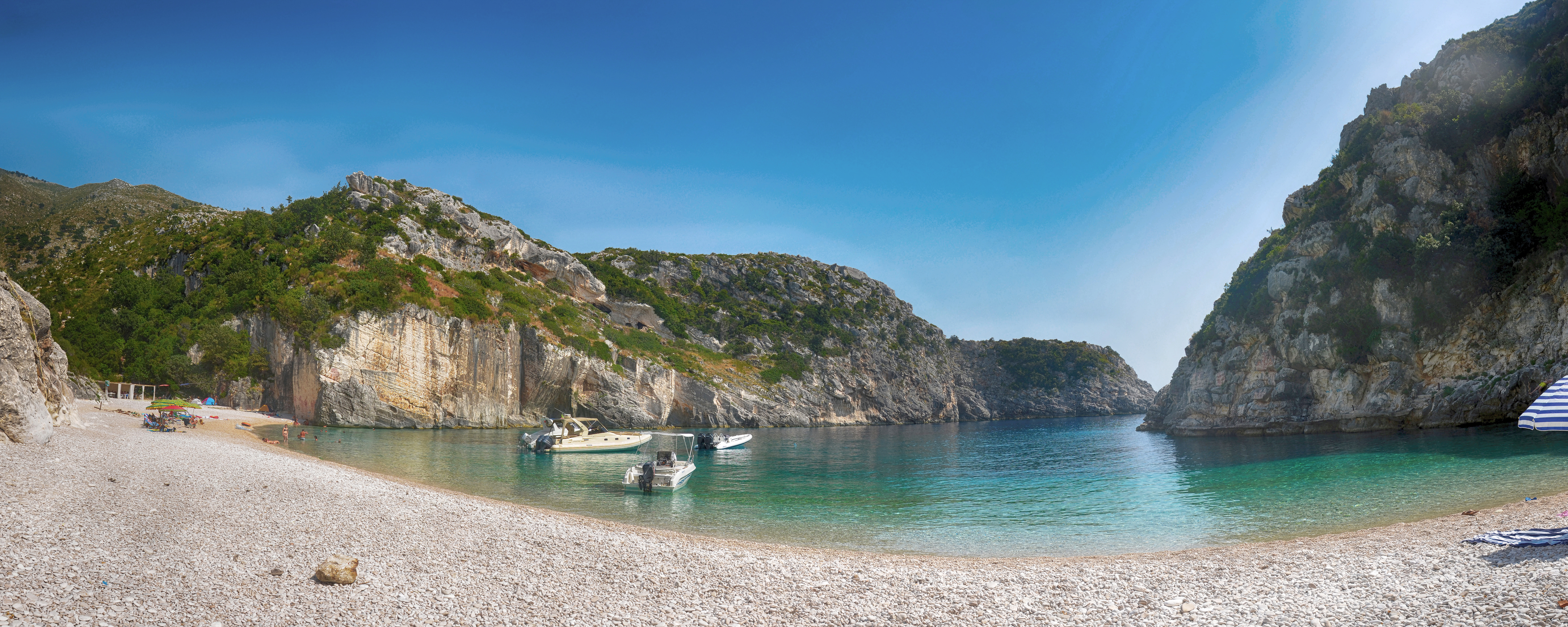
A panoramic view above the Bay of Grama.

== See also ==
- Albanian Ionian Sea Coast
- Biodiversity of Albania
- Geography of Albania
- Protected areas of Albania

== Sources ==
- Hajdari, Arben; Reboton, Joany; Shpuza, Saïmir; Cabanes, Pierre (2007). "Les Insciprtions de Grammata (Albanie)". Revue des Études Grecques. 120 (2): 353–394. doi:10.3406/reg.2007.7870. ISSN 0035-2039.
