= Dhoda =

Dhoda may refer to:

- Dhoda, Kohat, a village and union council in Khyber Pakhtunkhwa, Pakistan
- Dhoda, Chakwal, a village in Chakwal District, Punjab, Pakistan
- Dhoda, Ludhiana, a village in Punjab, India
- Tahta, known in Coptic as Dhoda, a city in Egypt

== See also ==
- Dhodha, a Hindu festival in Nepal
- Doda (disambiguation)
