= Action of 26 September 1575 =

1575 naval battle

- Part of Ottoman–Habsburg wars
Date	26 September 1575
Location	near Cadaqués
Result	Algerian victory

Belligerents
(Spain) Spanish Empire	Regency of Algiers

Commanders and leaders
(Spain) Pedro Gaspar de Villena † (Spain) Miguel de Cervantes (POW)	Arnaut Mami; Dali Mami

Strength
1 galley	3 ships

Casualties and losses
1 galley captured Majority were killed The rest were enslaved	Heavy

The action of 26 September 1575 was a naval battle on 26 September 1575 near the coasts of Catalonia, when 3 Algerian vessels fought with a Spanish galley and captured it, taking the famous Spanish writer, Miguel de Cervantes, as a prisoner.

During the first week of September 1575, Miguel de Cervantes embarked on a Spanish galley named El Sol with his younger brother, Rodrigo, who both fought at the Battle of Lepanto. The galley El Sol was one of the four-ship squadron led by Sancho de Leiva. On September 5 or 6, the squadron left Naples to Barcelona. On September 18, however, the squadron was hit by a violent storm near Port-de-Bouc. The galley El Sol was swept to Corsica. The rest of the three galleys successfully reached their destination.

The El Sol continued its journey, and on September 26, the galley approached the Catalan coast near Cadaqués. However, one of the sailors spotted a squadron of three ships approaching the galley, he quickly realized they were Algerian ships. The Algerians surrounded the vessel. The Algerian commander of the squadron, Aranut Mami, an Albanian renegade, and his lieutenant, Dali Mami, asked the Spanish commander, Pedro Gaspar de Villena, to surrender. The offer was refused and the Algerians attacked the ships. The Algerians charged at the Spanish galley for four hours, resulting in an engagement where both sides sustained heavy losses. Miguel de Cervantes summarized the battle:

After we had fought for sixteen hours, and after the captain and nearly all the crew of the ship had perished, at the end of nine assaults, the Turks furiously boarded the ship.

The majority of the Spaniards were killed, including the commander. The survivors, including Miguel and Rodrigo, were enslaved and taken to Algiers. The squadron of Sando suddenly appeared and chased the Algerians, however, they were able to escape the Spanish. Rodrigo would be ransomed on August 1577, while Miguel on 1580.

== Sources ==
- Nic Fields (2021), Lepanto 1571, The Madonna's Victory.
- Alan G. Jamieson (2013), Lords of the Sea, A History of the Barbary Corsairs.
- María Antonia Garcés (2002), Cervantes in Algiers, A Captive's Tale.
