= Doda (surname) =

Doda is a surname of multiple origins.

== People with this surname ==
- Bib Doda, 19th-century Albanian chieftain
- Anton Doda (c. 1680 – 1766), Albanian vice consul and merchant
- Carol Doda (1937–2015), American stripper
- Federico Seismit-Doda (1825–1893), Italian politician
- Haruna Doda (born 1975), Nigerian footballer
- Xhevdet Doda, An Albanian from Kosovo who was a resistance fighter during World War II
- Bajrush Doda (1936–2011), a traditional Albanian singer from Kosovo, well known for performing with traditional instruments like the çifteli.

== See also ==
- Doda (disambiguation)
