= Ceni =

Ceni or Cenis may refer to:

- Mont Cenis, a mountain in France
- Hasinai, a Native American tribe
- Ceni (surname), the name of several notable people
- Cenizo, a band of Coahuiltecan Native Americans

== See also ==
- CENI (disambiguation).
