= Albanian piracy =

Historical period, 15th-19th centuries

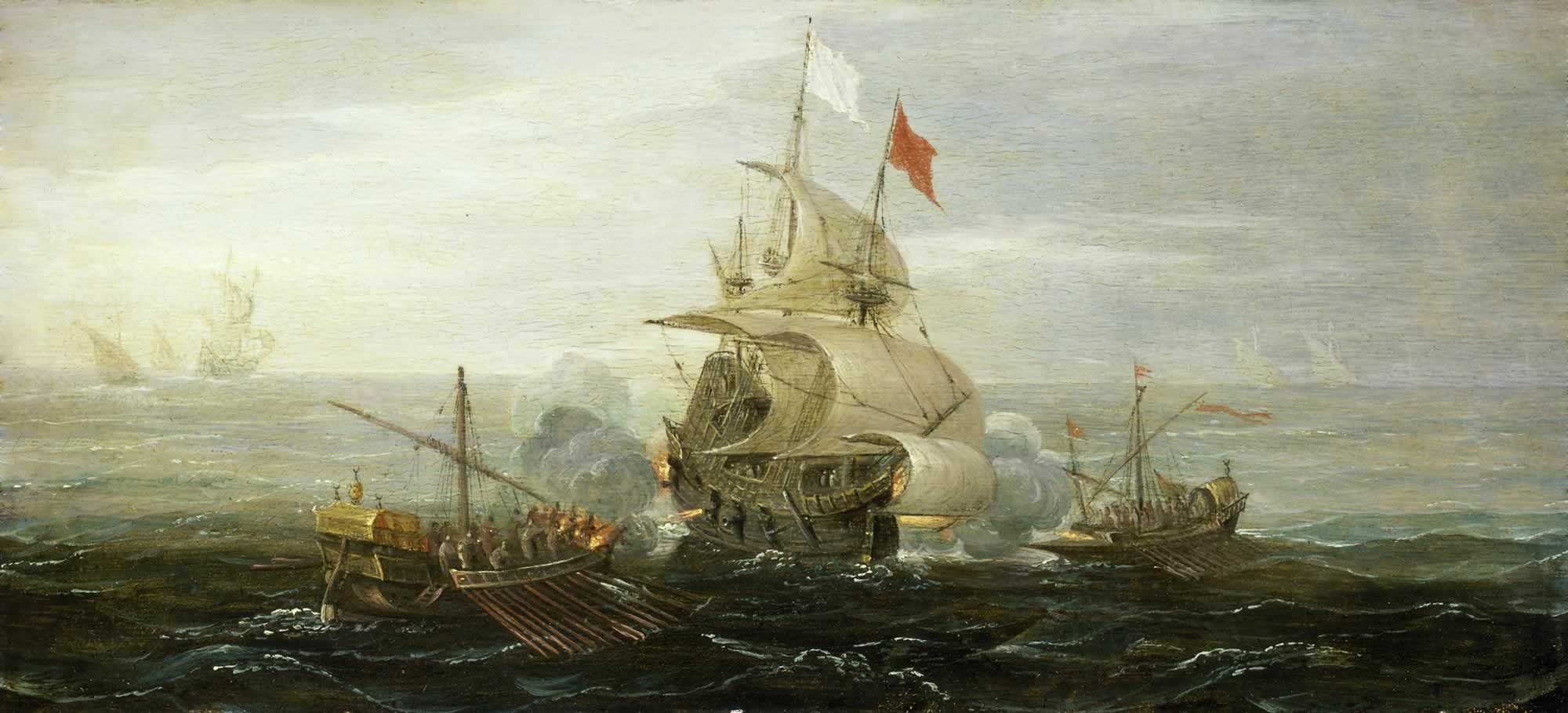
Pirates attacking a French ship

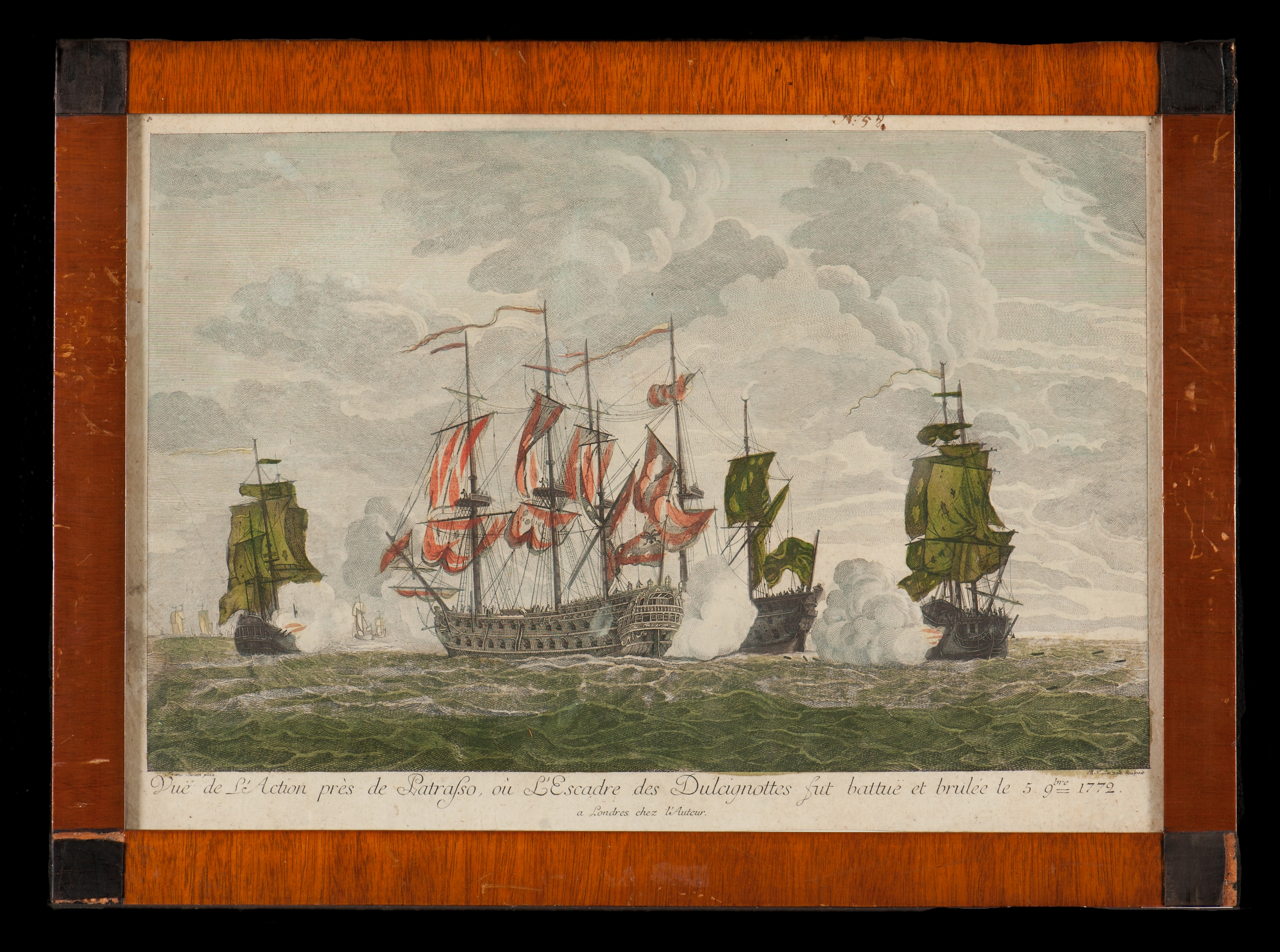
Painting from 1772 depicting British and French sailors at battle with Dulcignottes (Ulcinj pirates). These pirates were defeated on 5 September 1772.

A period of Albanian piracy (Albanian: Piratëria shqiptare) occurred from the 15th to the 19th centuries, during which Albanian pirates plundered and raided ships. These pirates were based mainly in Ulcinj, but were also found in Bar and Ragusa (now Dubrovnik), and had connections with North Africa.

They plundered European ships mainly for the Ottoman Empire, disrupting the Mediterranean economy and forcing European powers to intervene. Some of the pirate leaders from Ulcinj, such as Lika Ceni and Hadji Alia, were well-known during this period. The Porte gave the name "name-i hümayun" ("imperial letters"), bilateral agreements to settle armed conflicts. The Ottoman Empire was also known to hire these pirates during periods of war. Some of the most famous barbary pirates of the Mediterranean Sea were the Ottoman Barbarossa brothers Oruç and Arnaut Mami.

The pirates of Ulcinj, known in Italian as lupi di mare Dulcignotti (Alb. ujqit detarë Ulqinakë, 'Ulcinian sea wolves'), were considered the most dangerous pirates in the Adriatic. They were not poor and violent criminals, but rather well-paid and established professionals; they were tactical merchants, traders, transporters, smugglers, diplomats and pirates whenever it suited them. They alternated between piracy and trading depending on season, enemies or local conflicts. Indeed, the captain of the Venetian galleys Alvise Foscari (1675–1751) wrote:

The Dulcignotti are not like the other corsairs who mostly compose their crew of miserable and hungry people. They are all well-off, established in this fortunate condition with the traffic after peace, so that a sinister accident would strike them, and put the present licentiousness in check. It's hard to catch them. With agile but small boats, they don't trust to stay too much on the sea, and after a rapid raid in Apulia, they return in Albania, equipped with more available hiding places which provide them asylum and security.

— Alvise Foscari, Dispacci 1708-1711, n. 44, 7 October 1710.

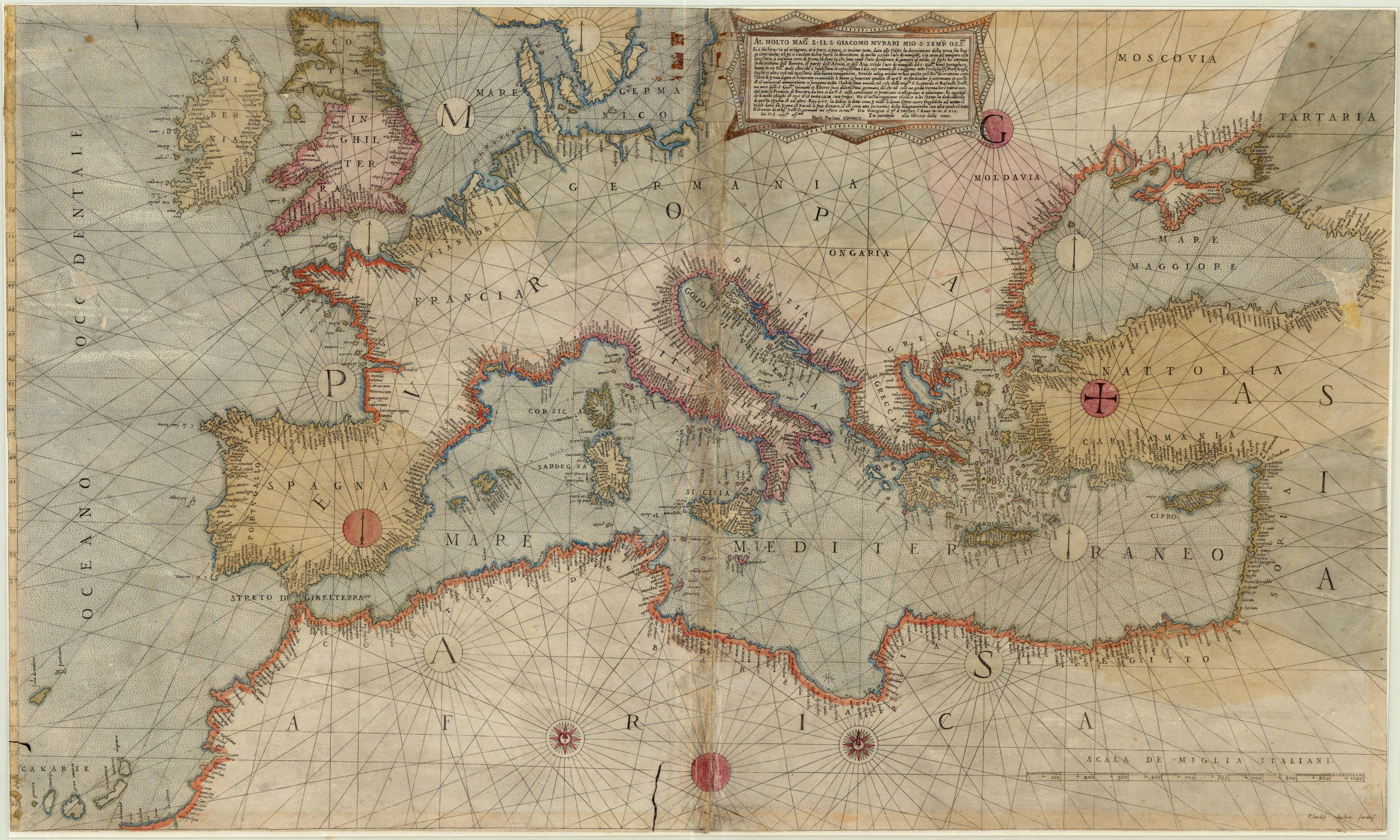
A 1569 nautical map of the Mediterranean Sea illustrating the Gulf of Venice (Golfo di Venetia) with the Albanian coast between Dalmatia and Greccia (top); Albanian coast (bottom)

== Origin ==
The first sign of piracy around the region of Ulcinj was documented during the Illyrian period, with pirates raiding Roman ships. The Labeates-tribe was known to live off piracy. In 1405, Ulcinj was occupied by Venice and remained a pirate haven despite the Ottoman conquest in 1571. By the end of the 16th century, around 400 pirates from Malta, Tunisia, and Algeria were based in Ulcinj. The coast of Ulcinj, Durrës and Cape of Rodon was sailed by pirates since the year 1096.

== Accounts of pirate activity ==
=== 14th century ===
Between 1320-1347, Albanian privateers, among other pirates, attacked both Muslim and Christian vessels in the Ionian and Adriatic sea.

Between 1368 and 1389 the Albanian Balsha owned their own ships and operated as Albanian pirates. Because of their anti-Ottoman attitude, the pirate activity of these Albanian lords was tolerated by the Republic of Venice. However, they limited Venice's operations.

=== 15th century ===
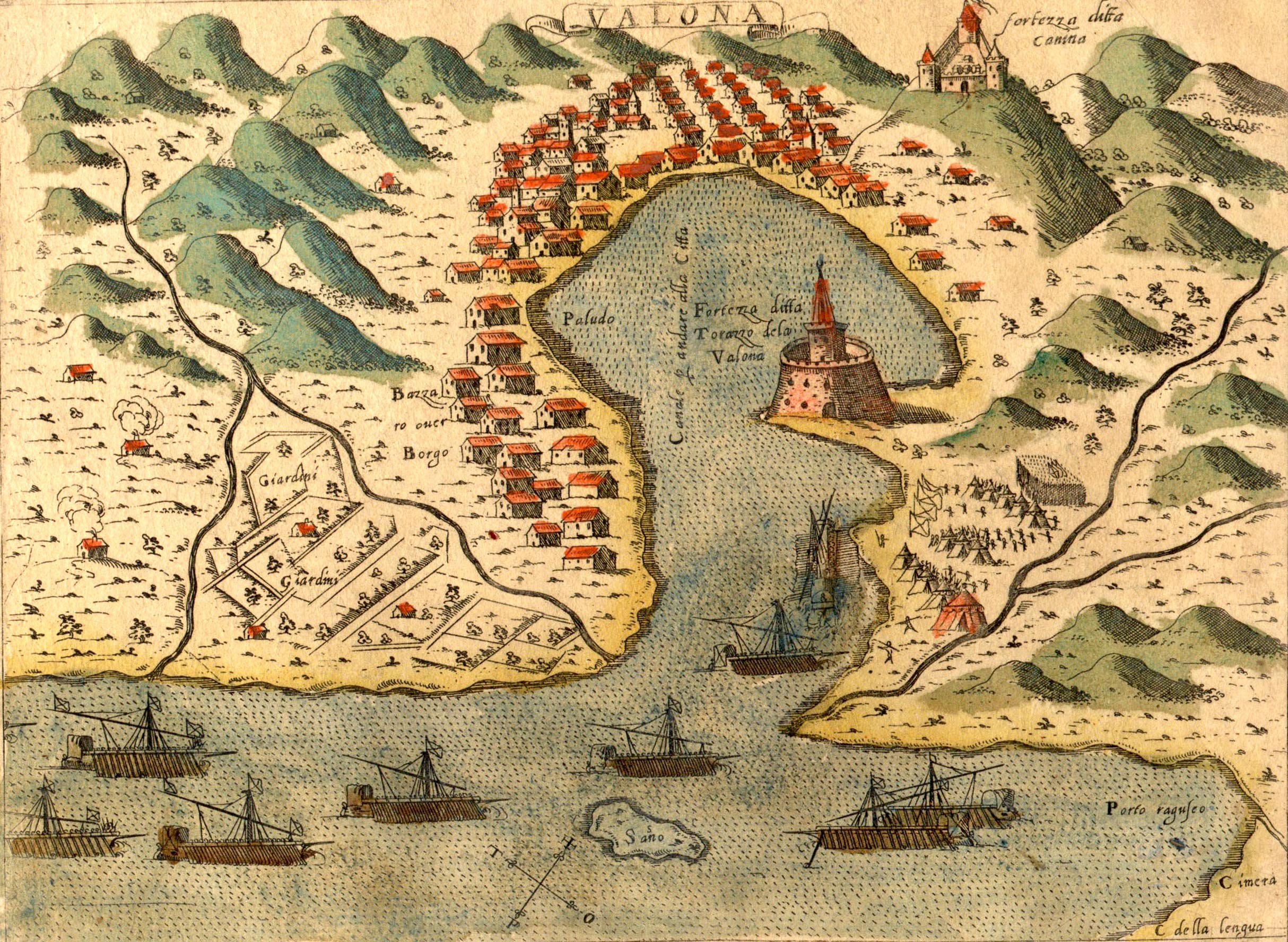
Map of Vlorë in 1573 by Simon Pinargenti

The Dalmatian writer Coriolano Cippico published in 1442 a short story in Venice of the campaign of the Doge Pietro Moceniga describing the Dulcignotes:

Indeed, even to our day the citizens of this town have retrained something of the savageness of their founder, and show themselves harsh and hostile towards strangers.

— Coriolano Cippico, Venice, 1442.

In 1479, Vlorë had become a pirate nest who raided both Venetian and when a peace agreement was signed between Venice and the Porte, Mehmed II ordered Gedik Ahmed Pasha to pay damages done by the pirates of Vlorë. The locals did not obey.

In 1486, during the Venetian-Ottoman wars, Albanian pirates raided the lower Adriatic and Venice sent commander Dario to deal with them.

Fernand Braudel notified in 1536 the Venetian senate that Albanian pirates were actively raiding ships between Corfu and Albania. In 1570, Albanian pirates were recorded to have inflicted heavy casualties on Venetian boats. In 1571, the pirates reached a climax with about 400 pirates from North Africa, Maltese, Serbian, Albanian and Turks causing chaos in the region. There was also "The Pirate Dance" invented by Albanian pirates where after a successful attack, the pirates celebrate by roasting meat, eating halvah and dancing ritual dances.

=== 16th century ===
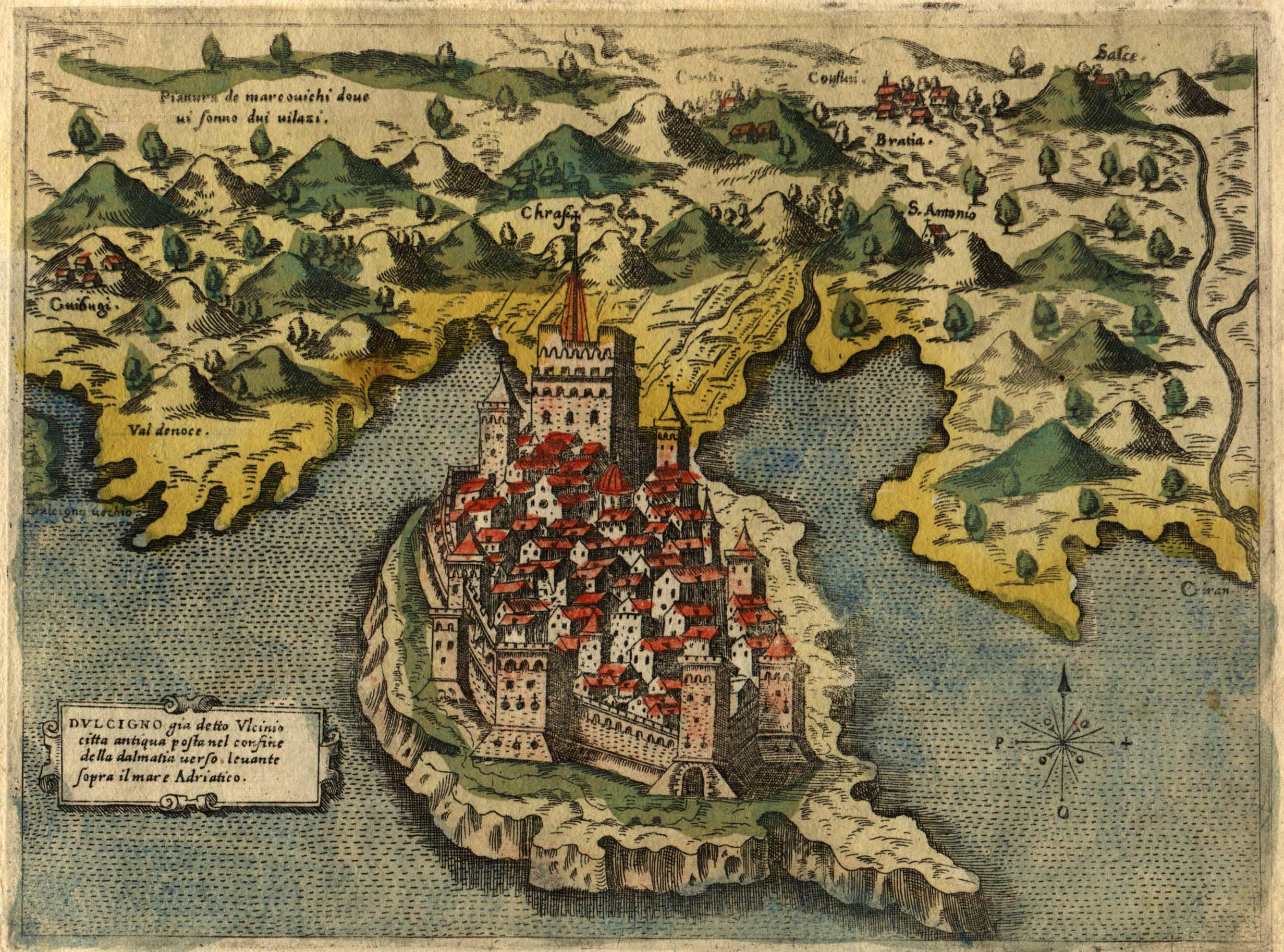
Map of Ulcinj in 1573 by Simon Pinargenti

During the 16th century, Ottomans attacked Ulcinj, the most notorious pirate haven of the Adriatic sea. There the Ottomans destroyed much of the pirate fleet. Nevertheless, the raids persisted.

In October 1503, six ships sailing from Vlorë reached Santa Maria di Leucca cape, and captured 60 people and offered their liberation for a price of 30 dukats.

In 1525, the pirates of Dulcigno attacked the city of Riviera delle Palme (Marche).

In January 1537, the Venetian ambassador in Istanbul, Tomasso Mocenigo, according to a letter from Suleiman I to the sandjakbey of Elbasan, had complained that privateer ships had attacked the Venetian territories and taken slaves who were sold in Durrës.

In 1554, 6 pirate vessels returned to Vlorë and were intercepted by a Venetian squadron who captured them, liberated their captives and then held the pirates under captivity.

In 1559, the Provveditore Pandolfo Contarini saw a pirate ship while patrolling the Gulf, and began pursuing it. The ship stopped at Durrës, where the pirates found protection under the Ottomans thus violating the agreement of 1540. Contarini ordered an attack and bombarded the harbor and the pirates had to surrender the goods and the ship, and when Contarini returned to Venice, he was removed from service and replaced. The sultan Qânûnî blamed the commander for having assaulted a merchant ship and Venice replied that they had negative experience with piracy and that Albanian merchants and pirates were not always discernible. The Sultan reacted rhetorically to Venice saying "I take care of my pirates, and you take care of yours" referring to Venice inability to deal with Maltese, Genoese and Cyprian pirates.

In 1571, in preparation for the Battle of Lepanto, Kara Hace, an Albanian pirate lord, commander and aga from Vlorë, gathered a fleet of ships.

In 1573, after the peace between Venice and the Ottomans, Dubrovnik served as an intermediary for Albanian pirates and those wishing to liberate their captives who would be kept at the Ragusans houses until the money arrived.

In May 1575, the pirates attacked the Spanish galley Sol, defeated the crew and towed the ship to the port of Ulcinj. Among the captives was Miguel de Cervantes, who was eventually released in 1580. The pirate leader Deli Topal Memi (Deli Topal Memi'ye) was given Cervantes' slave. In 1580, the pirates seized 25 ships at the bay of Kotor and the locals of Dubrovnik sent for help at the local pashas. In 1581, Ulcinj pirate lord Cafer Reis (Xhafer Reis) gathered 18 ships and robbed ships in the southern and central Adriatic forcing locals in the coastal towns to enforce their defences. The Ulcinj pirates became known as "Pulya and Sicilian whip". The locals of Kotor were mobilised by the Venetians who handed out rifles and gun powder to oppose the pirates. In the spring of 1587, the pirates robbed a frigate from Dubrovnik carrying 3,000 ducats to Carcass to buy wheat. The captain was killed and the crew wounded and sold into slavery in the Ottoman Empire. Venetian studies at the time estimated that around 36% of all the cargo of the ships were damaged by the pirates.

In 1586, Murad III ordered the sanjakbeg and the qadi of Vlorë to prevent the Albanian pirate Mehmed reis from shipping with his galliot to pillage Venetian lands. In 1590, a Venetian ship anchored in the Buna river, near Shkodër, to get water but were looted by the locals. In 1593, the Sultan ordered that ships built in Shkoder, fit for privateering, were to be prohibited and that pirate ships be burned.

In 1593, a conflict between Venice and Habsburg Spain emerged after the Venetian building of the fortress of Palma. For this reason, the Venetians were accused for getting too close to Habsburg territory with the rational of "to oppose the arms of the Turks". It also turned out that the Venetians targeted the region of Gradisca and were, according to Colemberg, financing Albanian pirates to raid Habsburg ships in the Gulf of Trieste.

=== 17th century ===
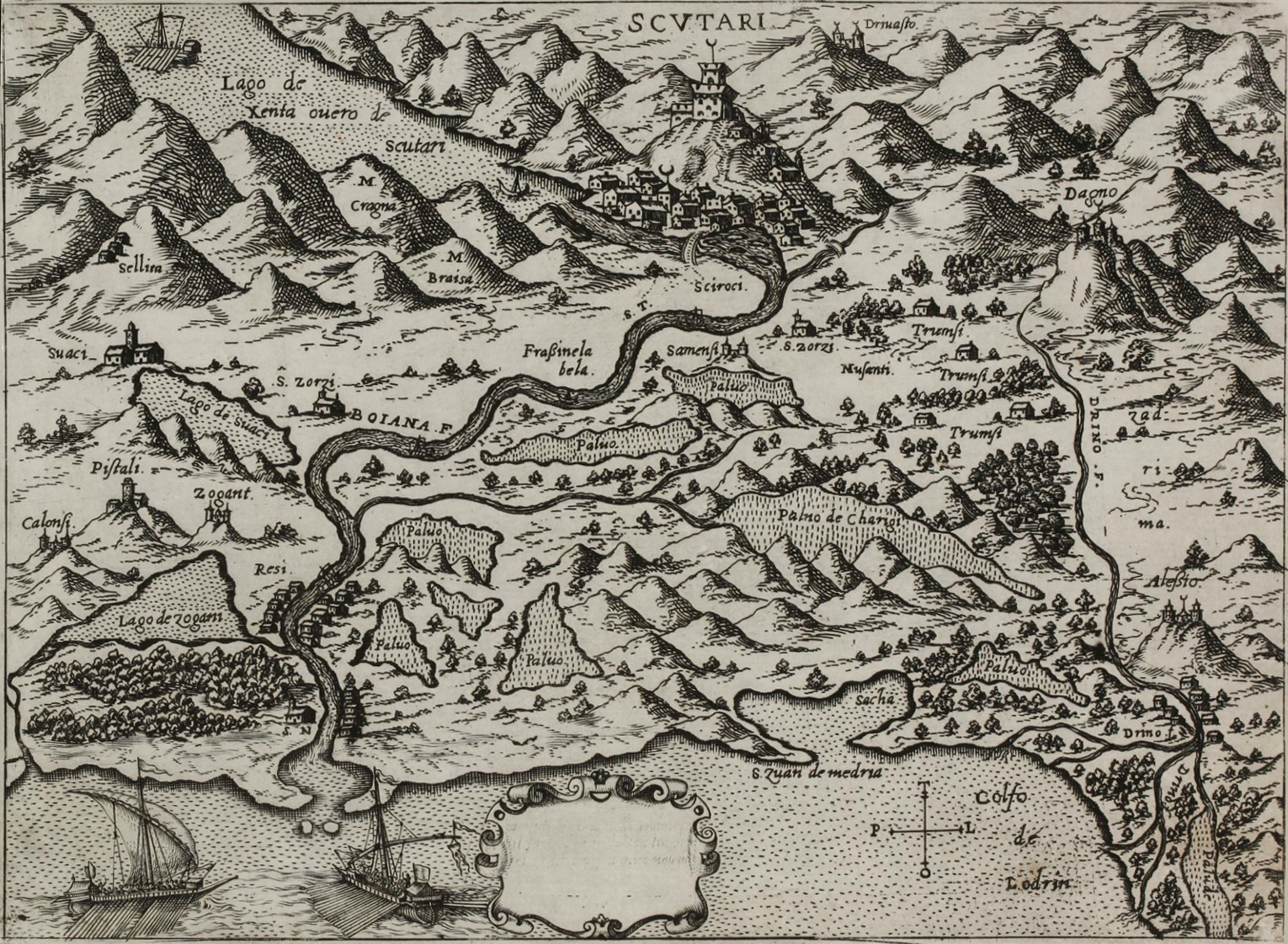
Map of Shkodër with the Buna river in 1571 by Giovanni Francesco Camocio

In 1602, the Venetian ambassador, Nicolo Molin, complained about the situation, describing the Albanian pirates as "unbearable." In 1605, captain Bernardo Venier attempted to eliminate the pirates but failed. In the same year, the Sultan ordered that the pirates İbrahim ağa of Durrës, Mustafa ağa, Ahmed kahya, Bali, Mustafa, and Hasan kahya be arrested. In 1611, despite warnings from the Sultan, the former sanjakbeg of Karlı-eli (Mehmed bey) and the sanjakbeg of Dukagin (Mehmed bey) continued to raid the Adriatic with their galliots, caiques and fustas. In 1612, Albanian pirates, hired by Ottomans, attacked Venetian ships as a retaliation for the Uskoks raid, according to the Sultan who wrote a letter to the beylerbey of Bosnia: "Uskoks raided the zone of Makarska (Macarsca) but some Albanian boats attacked them and freed the Turks they had made prisoners; thus, the inhabitants of Gabela and Makarska equipped some kayıks to protect themselves from the pirates".

On May 8, 1607, 12 Uskok boats clashed in the Adriatic with Albanian-Muslim pirate ships and the Uskoks suffered a severe defeat.

In 1615, Prince Ferdinand II, Holy Roman Emperor of Styria hired Albanian Uskok pirates to harass Venetian ships which led to war with Venice.

In 1617, Albanian pirate lords Avci Oglu, Kara Mustafa, Karaca Bali, and Aksak Hoca operated around Shkodër.

By 1630, Albanian pirates became a severe problem again, forcing Venice to request assistance from the Ottoman Empire. In 1638, Venetian sources refer to the raids of the pirates of Ulcinj along the Dalmatian coast and in the Candian War (1648-1669). In 1653, Venetian war ships patrolled the ocean warning nearby ships of the pirates.

In 1622, some pirates from Delvinë attacked ships in Venetian territory and 1623, Ulcinj pirates (Ülgünlular korsanları) attacked the subjects of Budva with vessels, which resulted in the Ottomans demanding that the stolen goods be returned and the pirates punished.

In 1637, the cities of Modon, Coron and Navarino demanded that the Ulcinj pirates release two Venetian slaves who had been captured during peace time.

In 1645, during the Cretan War, pirates from Ulcinj raided the Dalmatian coast forcing the islanders to defend their houses. In 1656, Ottoman pirates from Ulcinj and Santa Maura attacked and robbed Venetians ships into Trogir but were successfully chased away by the Venetian navy. In 1670, the Sultan ordered his commanders to stop the pirates from Ulcinj attacking Venetian ships. Antonio Baldacci wrote in the 17th century that there were at least 500 pirates around Ulcinj.

In 1672, Venice demanded that the sandjakbeys of Shkoder burn the armed ships of Ulcinj.

In 1675, Krsto Zmajević from Perast was sent to eradicate the Ulcinj pirates for which he was rewarded with a golden necklace by the Venetian Senate.

In 1685, the Dulcignote pirates attacked Novigrad, numbering a population of 100, who were enslaved including the Venetian mayor.

On March 31, 1685, the Republic of Ragusa requested from the Sulejman Pasha of Shkodër in a document stating that they wanted 19 captives back who had been taken by Ulcinj pirates. In July, the pirates had liberated 19 captives but instead captured another 16.

In 1696, from August 9 to September 5, Venetian forces tried to invade Ulcinj which was defended by Ulcinj pirate lord Hajdar Karamindja (Hajdar Karamidžolu) who defended the city successfully.

In 1680, the Dulcignote pirates were hunted by two Venetian galleottes and a bloody fight ensued in Cattolica. The Dulcignotes threw bombs at the Venetians, resulting in them being burnt down and defeated. Around 120 Venetian sailors were killed and five survived in the water where they remained for over five hours.

=== 18th century ===
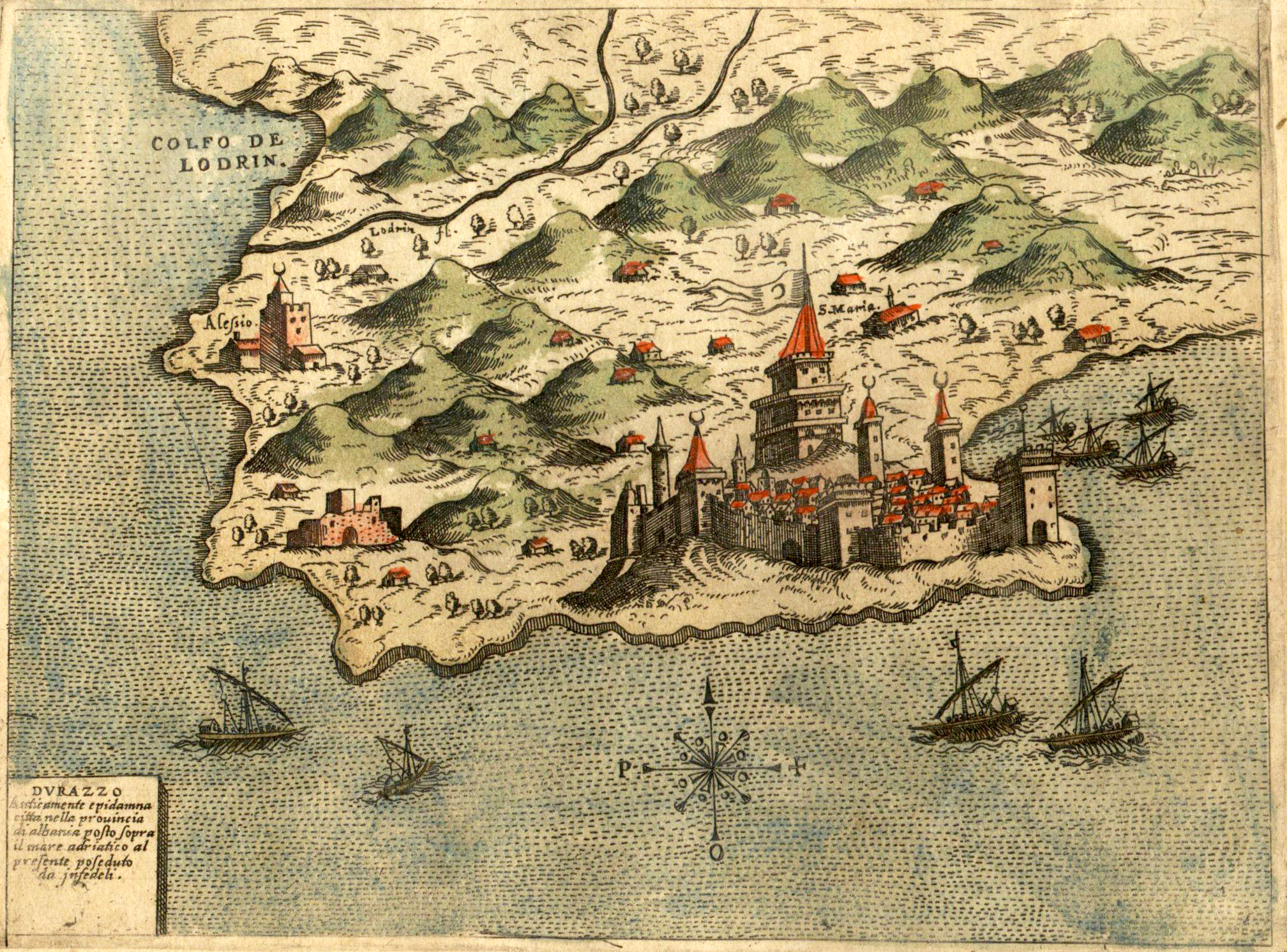
Map of Durrës in 1573 by Simon Pinargenti

Throughout the 18th century, Venice complained that their economy was harmed because privateers of Ulcinj were smuggling and taking advantage of the fact that Venice demanded high taxes for the transportation of goods attracting merchants to Albania.

At the end of the 18th century, after the withdrawal of the French government from Levant, Greek ships were given patents or passports, liberating them from cartaz, from the Grand Master of Malta and Greek notables. However, these passports were resold to the pirates of Ulcinj who would use these passes at the corsair city of Tripoli. Privateers and governors of Ulcinj protected the pirates and Venice complained vehemently as their economy was severely damaged.

On July 12, 1700, there was a complaint sent from Pontchartrain, the consul of the French consulate in Constantinople (1668–1708), to the Chamber of Commerce of Marseilles, after a certain Chateauneuf restituted a ship after it had been stolen by the Dulcignotes. Another letter was sent on August 4, 1700, complaining that the Chamber of Commerce had not yet repaid the consul in Constantinople after the French barque was taken by the Dulcignotes. A third letter was sent on August 24, 1700, once again demanding that the Chamber pay the sum for the barque of Dulcigno so that Constantinople could balance the accounts for the year. Eventually, the Chamber responded on June 13, 1701, that the receipt was acknowledged on March 2 and that the Chamber had begun working the case of Dulcigno as it now had turned into a dispute between France and Constantinople which resulted in the refusal of a payment.

In 1714, a Christian merchant from the court of the Pasha of Scutari confided to the Neapolitan consul in Ragusa, Giovanbattista Vlaichi, that the Dulcignotti had obtained permission to plunder the ships of the Papacy, Maltese and Puglia. On November 12, 1715, the Dulcingotti captured a ship with an imperial banner, on the island of Lastovo, Croatia, and brought it to Ulcinj. In May 1712, the Dulcignotti plundered the towns of Armeri and Terranova, where 32 people were captured. Again, in 1726, the Neapolitan consul Giovambattista Zicchi in Ragusa began to exert pressure on the Pasha of Albania due to the raids.

On August 15, 1711, Venetian captain Carlo Miani proposed to poison the Albanian pirates. Between May and November 1726 the captain poisoned a kidney and met with Dulcignot pirate captain Bego Bolotti, but due to a misunderstanding the poisoned kidney was eaten by another sailor and the pirate escaped.

According to archives from Vienna, between 1711 and 1712, the Dulcignoti plundered more than 500 sailors.

During the Ottoman–Venetian War (1714–1718), trade relations were suspended and Ulcinj ships were ordered by Istanbul to stop Venetians from loading goods onto the Albanian coast and that all ships be suspended. This led the Ulcinj agas to kill the dizdar of Ulcinj who intended to implement the Sultans orders. As the piracy grew, the Sultan ordered Ibrahim Pasha of Bosnia to stop the pirates which was only possible after a joining of the Pasha of Shkoder. It is believed that Black slaves arrived in Ulcinj thanks to the Albanian pirates who traded with the Maghreb barbary pirates. Mehmet Pasha of Shkoder burned down the ship of Ulcinj pirate captain Ajdar Piri in the city port in front to the inhabitants.

Around 1713, Ottoman officials and Jean-Louis d'Usson (known as De Bonnac) exchanged letters on the "privateers of Ulcinj" where French ships had been plundered. This led to Ibrahim Pasha, governor of Alexandria, accompanying the Porte agent Osman Aga to Ulcinj.

On April 13, 1715, the mayor of Rovinj was warned that the Dulcignotti (Ulcinj pirates) planned to sail the sea and use their convicts to run the Gulf. On August 18, several armed pirates boarded the port of Rovigno two miles outside of the city where they defeated the land forces and enslaved the locals, as well as stealing three trabaccolo ships. Many ships from the city fell into the hands of the Ulcinj pirates. On June 13, 1718, the pirates took a trabaccolo loaded with oil and almonds in the vicinity of Rovinj, and attacked a party of marciglianas with salt and wood as they were sailing through Venice.

In 1715, Monsignor Matranga of Dionysius arrived in Rome and requested to be compensated for the expenses of his missionaries were raided by "Dolcignotti corsairs" and as a result the missionaries had to take refugee in Zara.

In 1715, captain Julije Balović met two Ulcinj pirate convicts at Safeno, Levant, and helped them escape and in a kidnapping which occurred in Novo Porto in Albania.

In 1716, German author P.G. Pfotenhauer writes in the "Historie des Jahrs oder zur Kirchen- politisch- und gelehrten Historie dieses Jahrs gehörige Haupt-Anmerckungen" that the Dulcinotis flying the Kaisers flag, attacked Venetian, Genoese, Florentine and Papal ships.

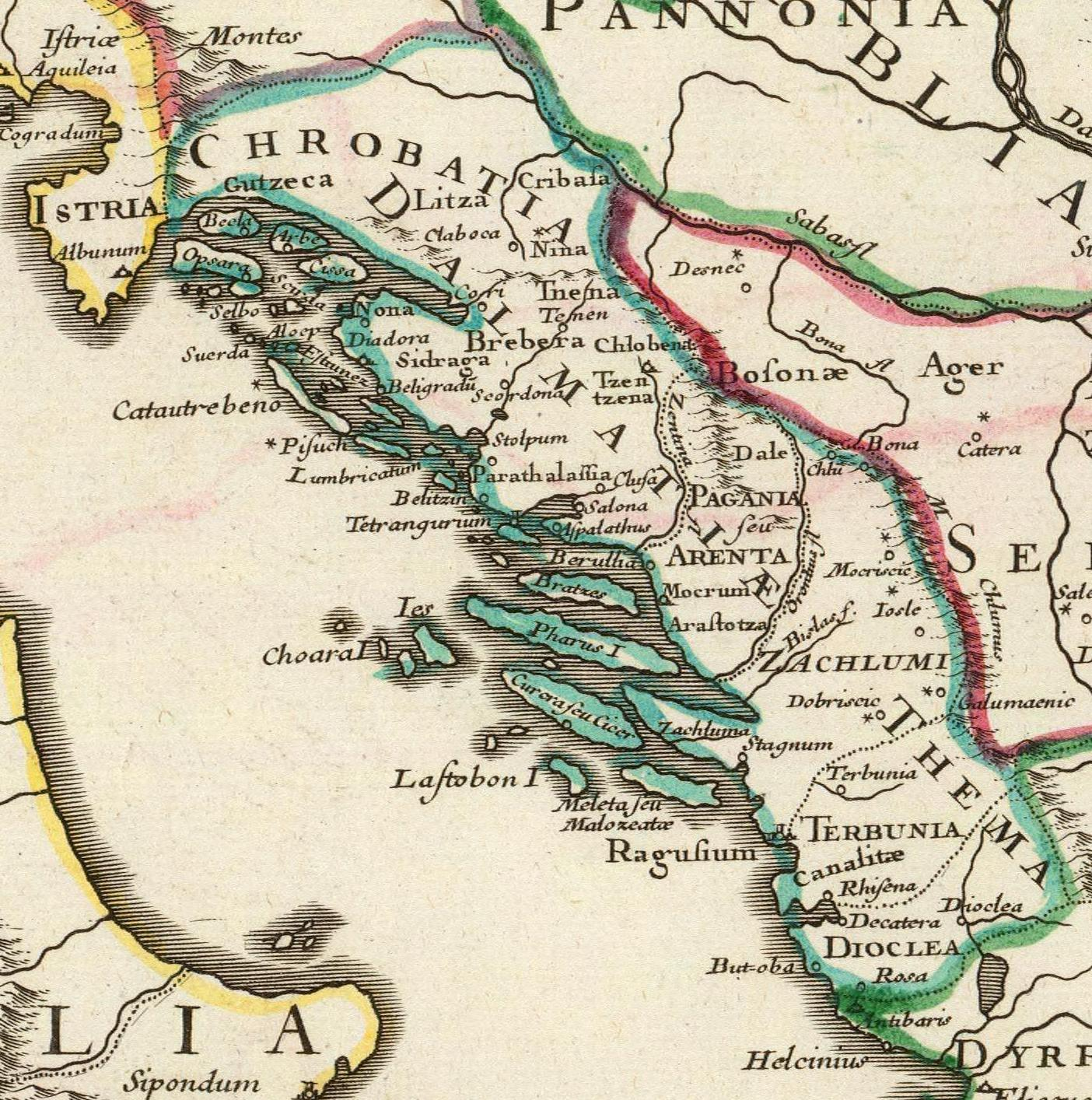
Map of Dalmatia in 1715 by Guillaume Delisle

In December 1707, corsairs from Ulcinj assaulted a French ship in the port of Gruž's port and when Ragusans offered aid and managed to overpower the pirates, two Ragusans and a Frenchman were killed. In 1708, The General Provider of Dalmatia found that the strength of the pirates of Ulcinj had grown considerably. These pirates now fully controlled the trade routes of Drače and Bojan. The pirates of Ulcinj were also quite active in Dalmatia, Istria, and Friuli. During raids on merchant vessels, Albanian pirates habitually disguised themselves as pirates from the Maghreb. However, after the Treaty of Passarowitz in 1718, imperial orders were issued that targeted all groups of pirates.

On June 22, 1717, the Dulcignotti landed in Aridonniche and spread to the surrounding plains. In the Lice building there was a German garrison made up of a lieutenant and 26 men on horseback who rushed to face them and routed them, killing 15 and wounding many. Only two of the German soldiers died. On May 12, 1719, a Genoese tartana led by Padron Andrea Gorgone, loaded with 2300 tomoli of wheat, was attacked under the Vecchia tower by the Dulcignotti. The sailors, to escape life and slavery, rushed into the sea and took refuge in the nearby tower.

After the treaty, Venetian official Giacomo Diedo stated in a document of how Venetian ships faced difficulties in navigation after Spanish Habsburg repurchased territories lost in Utrecht thus forcing Venice to focus on the Adriatic. Here Venetian ships would continue to face threats from the Dulcignotti pirates, dressed as merchants and corsairs, who continued to raid ships on their way to Naples. The treaty had failed to protect Venetian commercial interests from constant raids and Ottomans failed to stop the piracy, sometimes even aiding them. Many ships were stopped by the maritime fleets for controls but sometimes it proved troublesome. In July 1735, the Spanish had stopped a turquoise "Veneto trabaccolo" and detained it, originating from Shkodër and carrying "many Turks and Christian subjects of the Porte". However it was a Dulcignotte ship which the Spanish had seized who then proceeded to take the slaves, according to the French consul in Ancona. The merchants of Shkodër complained to Venice. It turned out that the Spanish had confused the Shkodër ship with another as the former traveled with no Venetian sign of certificate for Pubblica Veneta Rappresentanza qualifying the Albanian merchants as subjects to Venice.

In 1718, Jose Isnar, the French council in Durrës, wrote that the pirates terrorizing the Adriatic coast "respected neither Sultan nor any other authority." In the same year, an English merchant ship known as The Adventure, led by a commander Cleveland, met 12 ships from Dulcigno who went on board the English ship as friends. When they outnumbered the English, numbering 32, they were seized, had their hands tied and were then thrown over board. The pirates transported the ship to Durrës where they sold the goods. The English consul in the city immediately reported what he heard to the British ambassador in Istanbul who then ordered Ottoman captain Capighi Bassa (Pasha) to find and punish the pirates.

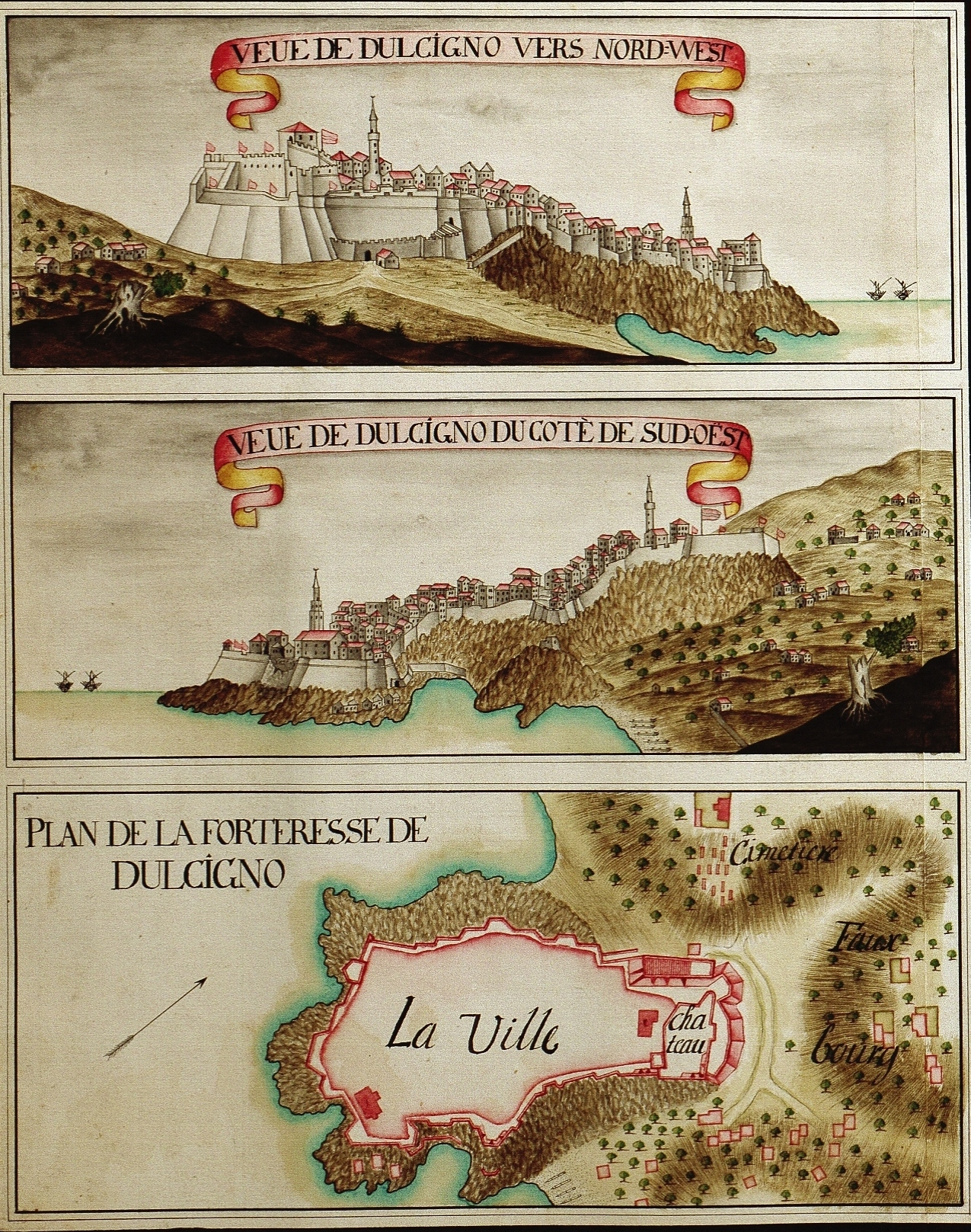
Views of Ulcinj in 1718 bz H. C. Bröckell

In 1718, Venetian ships bombarded ships boarded by "Ulcinian corsairs" outside the coast of Durrës who had seized seven vessels, however, the attacks were too far away thus proving ineffective.

In 1720, the merchant Ibrahim of Vlorë was killed on the Venetian ship of Puppa Rossa (Eng. Red Stern) commanded by Ali Reis from Ulcinj, in the harbor of Venice. The victim had powerful relatives who wanted justice and the Ottomans demanded an investigation which showed that he had been killed by sailors from Ulcinj.

On February 14, 1721, the captain of Piran had chased away a "tartan of Ulcinj" who was there to plunder. On February 28, the captain of Capodistria (Istria) give instructions to the representatives of Istria, so that they would be prepared if they met "dulcignote tartane" (Tartans of Ulcinj).

On Januar 7, 1721, the Spanish agent Dom Felix Corvèse arrived in Rome who together with the Cardinal of Altam was ordered to ask the Sacred College for money as the threat of the Ottomans was closing in. A Venetian ambassador in Ulcinj had discovered that at night, the Dulcignotes (Ulcinj pirates) were stealing muskets from the Spanish which they carried into their homes. The Inquisitors, after finding out, had the merchants arrested who eventually confessed that they had sold arms to the Ottomans.

On September 15, 1721, The Weekly Journal : Or British Gazetteer published an article about an event which had occurred some time before in Venice. A crew of Dulcignote sailors were at the harbor. One of the pirates got in a fight with a butcher. The rest of the crew wielded arms and opened fire at passersby, killing five or six. The sailors were then killed by Venetian soldiers. The event was denied by the Grand Vizier and instead demanded compensation for the loss of his subjects.

In 1826, the Austrian paper Geschichte der Republik Venedig published a volume mentioning an event which had occurred in 1722 during the war of Peter the Great against the Ottomans. A ship from Ulcinj flying the Turkish flag landed in the port of Venice. There was a dispute between the Slavonians and some of the crew. Several Dulcignottes were killed and the ship was set on fire. The Porte demanded compensation for the loss of their subjects, while the Venetians claimed that the death of the Dulcignottes was not a valid reason of compensation. The Porte stated that a foreign ship received in the port had to be under the protection of the government of the country. After a long negotiation and threats from the Porte, Venice released 200 slaves and paid a sum of 12 000 pilasters. This led to the Venetian government fortifying the islands of Greek sea.

In 1722, Italian writer Francesco Paci mentions in the "Regole ed istituti dell'antichissima real Casa santa dell Redenzione de' Cattivi di questa citta e regno di Napoli" that the Eminent Cardinal Signor Prencipe Borghese received royal slaves, transported by "Turchi Dulcignotti", stating that they would be treated with every solicitude.

In 1726 a Dulcignotte pirate and a Barbarian Tartan took refuge in the Maghreb, and the Sultan sent orders to Tripoli and Tunis to have the marcigliana they had stolen on returned. Again, in 1728-29 the inhabitants of Ulcinj were forbidden from helping the Barbary corsairs.

A Venetian report from 1743 mentions a report from 1721 that a vessel of the Dulcignotes, alongside several Turks, have been seized and the ship burned by the order of the Senate, which resulted in the Sultan being offended considering the Peace of Passarowitz.

The pirate problem had grown so large that in 1723 the Sultan forbade the inhabitants of Ulcinj from leaving their harbors and they were forced to use only their own ensigns.

An Italian study of the history of Rovinj from 2010 mentions the writings of a Paolo Paulovich who in turn mentioned the canon Constantini who in 1733 founded the "Confraternity for the liberation of slaves" with the goal of freeing the crews of Rovinj that "fell miserably into the hands of pirate ships of the Dulcignottes".

In 1739, during The Treaty of Belgrade, the Ottomans were forced by Austria and Russia to stop the Dulcignotes (Ulcinj pirates), which led to a serious riot in Istanbul, in 1740. According to Joseph von Hammer-Purgstall, most of the rebels were Albanian which resulted in them being sent home.

In June 1742, Venice encouraged the Paštrovići tribed led by Boško Perazić to attack and rob the pirates of Ulcinj. However, Perazić continued pirating, resulting in the Providence Generale arresting Perazić in 1759.

In 1774, a Croatian captain named Antun visited Shkodër and Ulcinj and maintained contact with Dalmatian authorities in order to investigate an Albanian pirate named Omer Krika, who had sailed his ship from Ulcinj the Zaton and disturbed the government.

In September 1746, a certain Cristoforo Grillo was banished from Perast who irritated the Ottomans preying on their ships in Livorno. Eventually the pirates of Ulcinj captured him and hanged from a flagpole. The inhabitants of Perast, led by a Bujovich, avenged him by plundering a Dolcignatta tartana (Ulcinj ship) killing many Ottoman subjects. The Porte was much upset after the Dolcignotti complained and Venice promised to punish Bujovich. In order to please the Ottomans, the city of Perast had to pay a large sum.

In 1748, a pirate captain named Hadji Mustafa from Ulcinj robbed a Venetian ship in the waters of Buna and took the captain along two other crew members.

German author Joseph von Hammer-Purgstall writes in the Histoire de L'Empire Ottoman, published in 1840, of the "Barbaresques et les Dulcignotes" (Barbaresques and Ulcinj pirates) who inflect heavy damages on the Gulf of Naples in the year of 1750 costing over 1,000,000 piastres.

Leaving Bologna in 1750, at the age of 25, a young Venetian traveler named Gian-Marco traveled to the Ottoman world. On his journey, he was serving a Venetian officer when he was captured by Montenegrin and then sold to the Ottomans. After a year, he fled and reached Shkodër where he set sail for Durrës where he was captured by the Dulcignotti pirates.

From the 1750s, French and Neapolitan ships engaged in the Spanish war of succession and due to continuous raids from Ulcinj pirates, the locals of Ancona and Bar fled the cities. There were also Ulcinj pirates who sailed under French flags in order to pray on Ragusan ships.

In 1755, Commander Angelo Emo was the ship governor protecting convoys from pirate attacks from the Dulcignotti. He continued doing so in 1770–71, where he participated in the naval campaign for the elimination of the Dulcignotti pirates from the islands of Zante, Corfu, Cerigo.

On February 3, 1757, the Venetian ambassador wrote to the Senate describing an incident of piracy which had occurred in September 1756. A certain Paolo Caliga from Cephalonia had arrived in the port of Azder mentioning two armed Dulcignotti armed ships flying the flag of Tripoli. Before, he began speaking Venetian and managed to persuade the pirates to hand over the merchandise and arms which he placed in the house of the French consul. When the pirates, numbering 150 and led by Ulcinj pirate captains Hassan and Ibrahim, arrived in the harbor to make necessary provisions, they were suddenly approached by the poor peasants to which the pirates responded by raiding the Cephalonia vessel and the bay. The ambassador contacted the Porte and demanded that the Ulcinj inhabitants be suspended. The Porte sent the local reis from Shkodër who explained that it was impossible to gain compensation and that suspending Ulcinj from trade would result in innocent traders being punished for the crimes of a wicked few.

On December 17, 1757, the ambassador, again, wrote from Constantinople, Pera, mentioning a trabaccalo captain named Tiozzo who had been killed by Dulcignotti pirates in the waters of Puglia several months earlier. The ambassador also proposed to send an auctioneer to the Venetian Dalmatian general who would contact vice consul Anton Doda in Shkodër in order to settle complaints related to raids committed by Dulcignotte pirates. On Mars, 1759, the Ambassador wrote again to the Senate mentioning that on December 21, 1758, around 30 miles outside of Patras, opposite of Morea, Ulcinj pirate lord Sinan Komina was commanding a ship with eight roars on each side and new modern canons, on which 100 pirates served with 50 being from Ulcinj.

In 1763, a large "Dulcignotta" galley arrived at the port of Povijest at Drvenika. The inhabitants of Lugar tried to stop them but the Dulcignotte pirates beat them and proceeded to enter the village where a bloody fight ensued. One pirate was killed and others wounded on both sides. The authorities decided to ban the inhabitants from leaving the island of Vinišće. In 1765, the Dulcignottes decided to avenge themselves by banning "23 schiavis" (slavs) on Drevnik and robbing the village.

At the end of 1764, pirate captain, Sinan Komina, seized a ship from Livorno in Koron (Peloponnese) with a crew of 40 pirates. He then brought the seized ship to Bar. When Sultan Mehmed's men notified him the ship was missing, the Sultan ordered the arrest of Komina. Komina was forced to flee to Paštro, the home of his close allies, the Kažanegra family. In spite of continued Ottoman opposition, the pirates of Ulcinj regrouped under Komina at the beginning of 1765. Led by Kara Mahmud Pasha, the Ottomans launched an attack on Montenegro in 1785, once again destroying the pirate fleet. This measure, although successful, did not prevent future sporadic raids.

In January 1765, Albanian crews from Dulcino (Ulcinj) carried out frequent raid of all ships regardless of flag, taking advantage of the Russo-Turkish war.

In 1767, Joseph de Cambis held a journal between April 1 and September 17, describing his service on the king ship The Chimera destined to meet César Gabriel de Choiseul in Naples and beyond with the intention of fighting in the coast of Morea against the "Dulcignottes and other privateers". The ship was placed under the command of M. Grasse-Brianson and left the harbour of Toulon on April 28, 1767, and returned August 31.

On August 15, 1768, roughly 40 miles off the coast of Cape Passero in the south-east of Sicily, a Maltese ship spotted a pirate ship with two guns, four scuttles and 50 men led by captain Hossein Spahia Raïs from Dulcigno, towing another ship from Lazio loaded with timber. The pirates released the ship and tried to escape but were eventually caught by the Maltese who threw overboard various equipment thus enabling speed. Fighting began whereupon the Dulcignottes boarded the Maltese ship with the crew members opening fire with pistols and then using knives. The pirate captain was shot down with a blunderbuss and out of 28 Dulcignotte pirates and 8 Moors, 13 were killed, 12 wounded and 11 captured. The Maltese lost 5 men with 11 wounded with 2 being severe. The First Mate (second Raïs) survived and was released and indeed, he continued as a captain of a new ship.

On January 15, 1768, the Venetian head of administration of Dalmatia, Paolo Boldù, wrote to captain Zuane Zusto of the feuds between the inhabitants of Dobrota and Dolcigno (Ulcinj) with the first village being under Venetian jurisdiction and the other under Ottoman. Antonio Orio, another Venetian official, had written to Venice of the useless attempts of stopping the feud calling the inhabitants "treacherous". Paolo Boldù stated that the problems began when the two villages would not trade.

In April 1770, the Albanian captains from Ulcinj destroyed the Russian navy commanded by Alexei Grigoryevich Orlov outside the coast of Navarino.

According to a written source from 1840, titled "Encyclopédie Des Gens Du Monde, Répertoire Universel Des Sciences, Des Lettres Et Des Arts; Avec Des Notices Sur Les Principales Familles Historiques Et Sur Les Personnages Célèbres", in 1770 the Porte was to weak to defeat the Albanian pirates. On June 10, 1779, the Porte then sent out Gagi-Haça, an experienced sailor, who gathered a small naval force and engaged the pirates defeating them. The Albanian pirates from Tripoli however united and defeated the Russian fleet at Corinth and Patras.

In July, 1770, during the Battle of Chesma, part of the Russo-Turkish War (1768–1774), Vice Admiral John Elphinstone of the Russian navy, engaged in a battle with the Ulcinjian pirates and privateers, hired by the Ottomans, who lost. In English newspapers at the time, the pirates were described as "the only people who had the courage or fidelity to put to sea with a fleet in search of the enemy".

On August 2, 1770, Italian traveler Pietro Godenti reported in St. Petersburg that he had received a letter written from Trieste to Dmitri Alekseyevich Gallitzin that in Corfu and d'Ancona, the Ottoman fleet had been defeated by the Russian fleet led by Alexei Grigoryevich Orlov in the archipelago and that many "tartans of the Dolcignotti" had been sunk and dispelled.

In 1771, Alexei Grigoryevich Orlov hired Albanian sailors to attack the Ottomans and allowing them to fly the Russian flag. However, 300 sailors soon deserted the Russian navy and joined the Albanian pirates, and Orlov was sent to stop them.

Sometime in 1772, Albanian pirates seize two Russian ships and used them for piracy forcing Admiral Grigory Spiridov and Alexei Grigoryevich Orlov to warn the Ottomans as well as neutral ships in the Aegean sea.

On December 9, 1772, Joseph-Dimitri Gaspary, French consul in Athens, sent a letter to the French minister mentioning that a fleet of 30 ships from Dulcigné (Ulcinj) was destroyed by the Russians in the Gulf of Patras. Prior to this, four Dulcignote ships had enslaved 15 German and French soldiers from the island of Corfu and sold them to Salone. One of them, Joseph Vichel, from Alsace, escaped to the building of Captain Blanc of La Ciotat.

On March 15, 1775, The Pennsylvania Gazette published an article from a letter in Istanbul dated on November 17, 1774, where the Russian navy had discharged Albanian sailors from service, which resulted in the seas being overtaken with pirates with two Albanian Ulcinj pirates being mentioned: Manoli and Doli Constantine, who had taken three French ships and massacred the crew. Another ship was wrecked outside of Caramania where only two crew members survived.

In April 1775, Captain Ermanno Cinif Inglis set sail alongside Giovanni Patriarch, both under the Naples navy, from Trieste with knowledge of the armada of Tartane Dulcignotte numbering twice as big. Knowing this, the squad was split with two waiting in Ancona and Brindisi waiting for the Russian fleet to join them. In June, Ottoman corsairs alongside Dulcingotte pirates numbering 140 men attacked a Greek vessel in the port of Brindisi. The crew survived by covering under the cannons.

According to an article by French journalist Louis-François Metra published in the German paper Correspondance littéraire secrète in Neuwied in 1781, originally published in Venice, six English officers were captured by Dulcignotes (Ulcinj pirates) who then proceeded to rob them, strip them naked and leave them on the shores of the Nile where a Ragusan captain helped them. The reason was that the English were planning a mission against the Dutch.

In 1782, German scholar Johann Hübner writes that in 1717 the Dulcinotis (Ulcinians) transported much grain to Peru.

In January 1781, French traveller and translator Dérival de Gomicourt published in the Dutch correspondence "Lettres hollandoises, ou Correspondance politique, sur l'etat present de l'Europe, notamment de la république des sept Provinces-Unies" a letter from a London merchant destined for his correspondent in Ostend. The letter explains that the English government had sent six English officers to India to order Edward Hughes to launch an attack on British enemies. The same order was to be carried out in all the places where it was important that it be known. The English officers sailed along the coast of Egypt when a Dulcignote corsair captured them and stripped them of all they had. One of the officers wrote a letter at the end of the month from Venice to one of the parents in London and Gomicourt described it as "being sad".

In 1783, Anne-Charles-Sigismond de Montmorency-Luxembourg (1737–1803), grand seigneur and franc-macon, proposed to recruit at his own expense a French legion of Dulcignotes and of Albanians of which one would form a large and respectable unit.

In 1870, author Francesco Protonotari mentions in the "Nuova antologia di scienze, lettere ed arti" a letter from July 27, 1785, written by an Albanian to a friend in Pera, sent by the bailiff of Venice, where it is mentioned that sailors from Dulcigno, having visited Montenegro, witnessed how the Aga of Trebigne had kissed the feet of Mahmud Pasha of Scutari, with the intent of joining the Pashas journey to Castelnuovo and Ragusa. According to the witness, the Pasha had answered that he could not proceed with the travel after having sworn a truce to the inhabitants of Trebigne and Bossina. It is also mentioned that the Pasha had stopped all ships from leaving Duclignto after Ei-Mubarak, since he was planning to attack Curd Achmet Pasha of Beratto, continuing to Valona, in order to reach Morea.

In 1788, the paper Gazzetta universale: o sieno notizie istorice, politiche, di scienze, arti agricoltura published an article mentioning that the captain of the ship Vesua from Smyrna stated that a Russian fleet of 30 guns had left Trieste and engaged a fleet of Dulcignote pirates and slavs, lasting 14 hours.

In 1789, The Lady Magazine published an article from Trieste on June 4 describing a battle between "Dulcigno pirates", numbering 7 fleets, and the Russian fleet led by a major of Greek origin Lambros Katsonis outside the cost between Ulcinj and Kotor. The pirates lost 50 men and the Russians none. The Russians also freed a Venetian ship captured by Ulcinj pirates where 1000 Albanians then switched side. It is believed that the Ulcinj pirate lord Lika Ceni defeated and executed Lambros Katsonis in a duel, who himself had become a pirate before he joined Katsonis had joined the Orlov Revolt in 1770

In 1789, Gazetta universale published an article from June of a skirmish between Captain Constantine Livaditi, commander of a Russian fleet, against Dulcignotte trabaccolos, flying the Papacy flag, outside the port of Marina di Ragusa in modern day Italy. When they were spotted, the pirates left the trabaccolo and the captain opened fire resulting in five dead and one wounded. In the same time period, Major Lambros Katsonis reported while commanding the Russian fleet that seven Dulcignotti vessels were present in the Bay of Kotor. The Russian commander then proceeded to attack the pirates but to no avail. The Dulcignottes then placed themselves on the shores and prepared cannons from which they fired upon the Russians who themselves returned the fire with artillery sinking two Dulcignotti ships and resulting in 50 dead pirates.

In 1798, the French traveler François Pouqueville boarded the Italian merchant ship La Madonna di Montenegro in Alexandria heading to Calabria when they were attacked by Uluc Alia and his pirates from Ulcinj.

=== 19th century ===
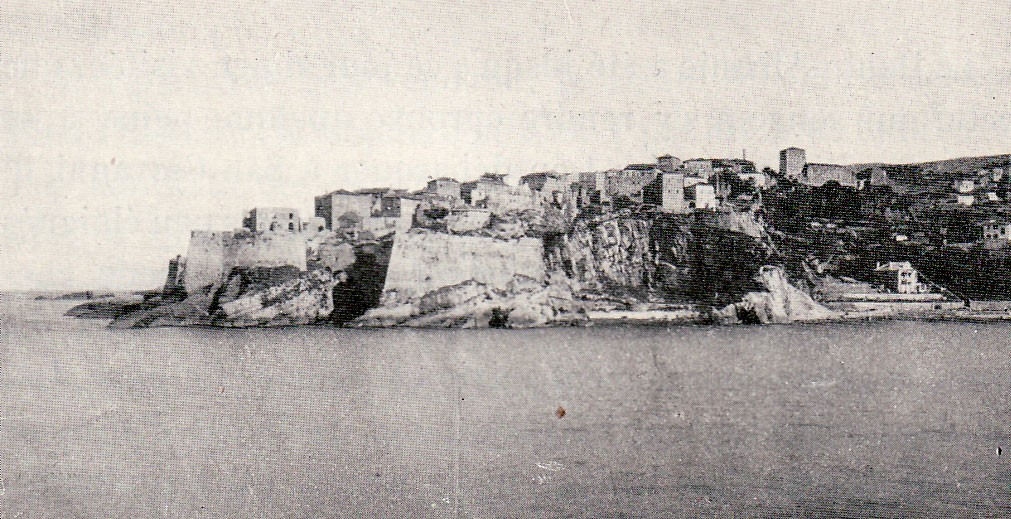
Castle of Ulcinj in the 1890s

At the beginning of the 19th century Henry Holland reported that in the Gulf of Salonika the name Albanian was applied to all pirates, similarly to the use of the name Cilician in Roman times. The archipelago at the entrance of the gulf has been a chief resort of pirates because of the number of vessels passing there and of the easy recruitment of Albanians who came down upon the coast. In 1813, the German painter and archaeologist, Otto Magnus von Stackelberg, was sailing close to Salonica when his ships were attacked by Albanian pirates. The artist was captured and held for a ransom of 60,000 piasters.

In 1816, the British government was in a dispute with the Neapolitan ambassador in London regarding the failure of dealing with Albanian pirate.

On August 14, 1817, journalists reported Albanian pirates raiding ships near Venice. James John Best wrote that an Albanian pirate attacked a British ship outside of Corfu in 1840. In 1818 more than 400 ships were counted among the Ulcinj navy.

Parliamentary Papers wrote of an attack in 1837 where 100 Albanian pirates, part of a secret organization in European Turkey, attacked a village outside the coast of Otranto and massacred the villagers. The leader was a pirate named Rafil Bey. John Hobbhouse wrote that the pirates of Dulcigno numbered some 6,000. The raids continued until the latter half of the 19th century and the piracy finally ended after the European powers united and forced the Ottomans to hunt them down.

Henry Alexander Scammell Dearborn noted in 1819 that Ali Pasha of Ioannina had some armed galliots manned by Dulcignotes.

In 1863, Viscountess Emily Anne Beaufort Smythe wrote that the Dulcignote pirates used to the "terror of Italy" and that the sailors were requested by the Porte.

== Ottoman support for the Albanian pirates ==
The pirates played a role in the competition between the Ottoman Empire and its rivals, usually siding with the Ottomans. In 1687, when the Ottomans lost the city of Herceg-Novi, Venice attempted to fill the vacuum but was prevented from doing so by a population of 500 pirates from Malta, Tunis, and Algeria, many of whom were veterans of the Kandyan Wars of 1669. The Ottomans are reported to have provided support to the pirates as long as they focused their raids on Venetian ships.

During this time period, the Ulcinj ship builders were the richest inhabitants of Northern Albania and they had a representative in Istanbul who would keep the pirates under control by bribing the Sultan. They were also supported from time to time by the Pasha of Shkodër who would warn them if England complained against the piracy. Evlia Celebi writes that the Sanjak-bey of Scutari would receive one tenth of the booty of the Albanian pirates after they had looted and raided.

=== Albanian Barbary corsairs ===
==== Barbarossa brothers ====
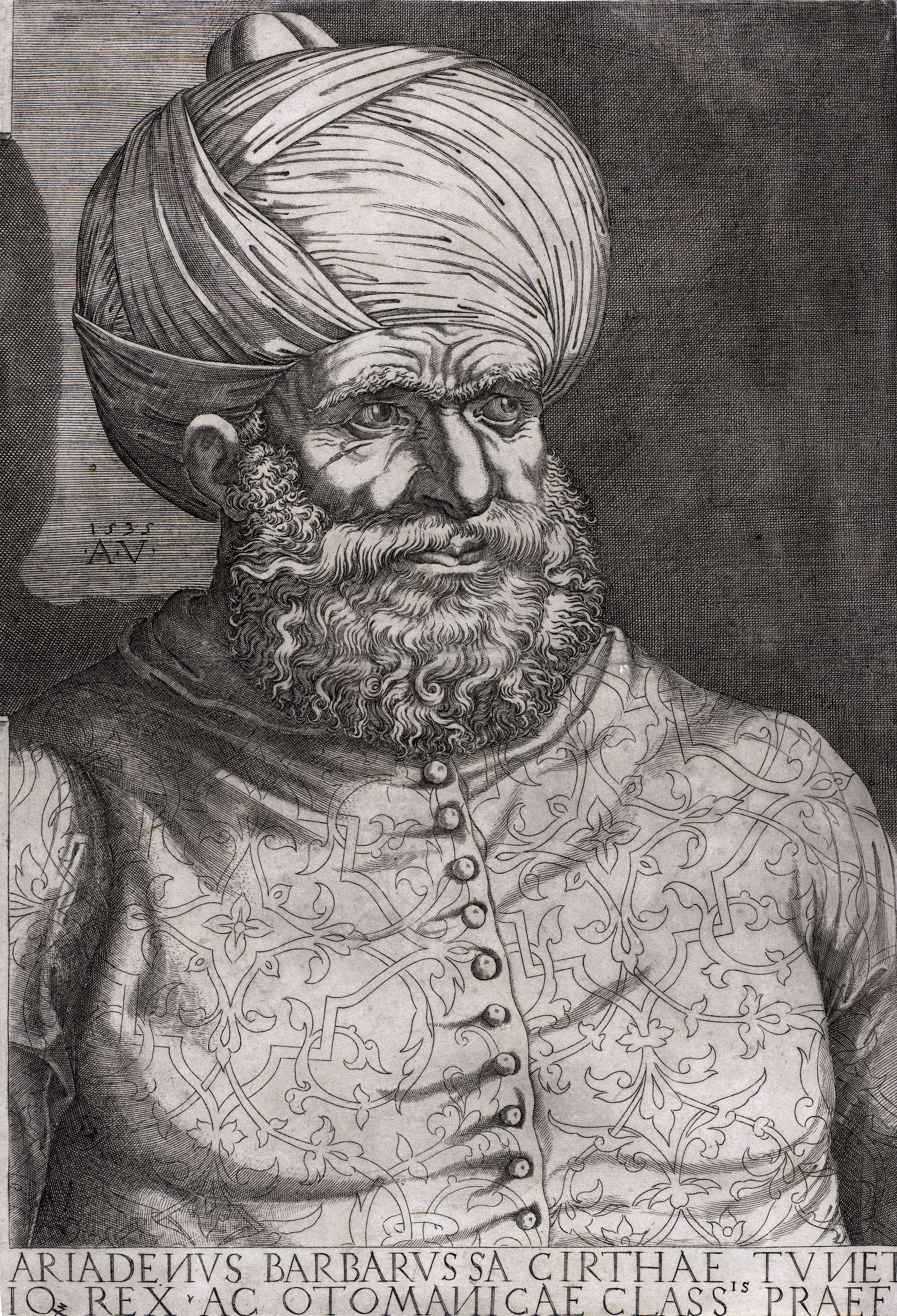
Hizir Hayreddin

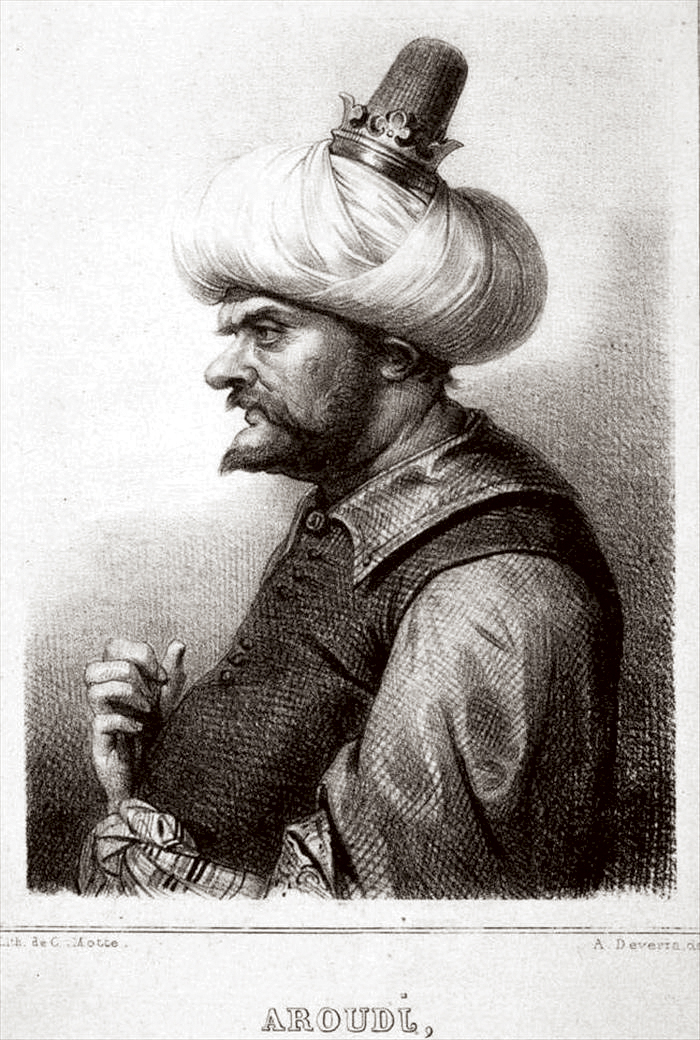
Oruç Reis

The most famous of the pirates in North Africa were the Ottoman brothers Oruç and Hızır Hayreddin. Their maternal ancestry was Greek, while their paternal ancestry is disputed as either Albanian or Turkish. They, and two less well-known brothers all became Barbary corsairs in the service of the Ottoman Empire; they were called the Barbarossas (Italian for Redbeards) after the red beard of Oruç, the eldest.

Oruç captured the island of Djerba for the Ottoman Empire in 1502 or 1503. He often attacked Spanish territories on the coast of North Africa; during one failed attempt in 1512 he lost his left arm to a cannonball. The eldest Barbarossa also went on a rampage through Algiers in 1516, and captured the town with the help of the Ottoman Empire. He executed the ruler of Algiers and everybody he suspected would oppose him, including local rulers. He was finally captured and killed by the Spanish in 1518, and put on display.

Oruç's youngest brother Hızır (later called Hayreddin or Kheir ed-Din) was a capable engineer and spoke at least six languages. He dyed the hair of his head and beard with henna to redden it like Oruç's. After capturing many crucial coastal areas, Hayreddin was appointed admiral-in-chief of the Ottoman sultan's fleet. In 1537 Hayreddin captured the island of Aegina and populated it with Albanians. Under his command the Ottoman Empire was able to gain and keep control of the eastern Mediterranean for over thirty years. Barbaros Hızır Hayreddin Pasha died in 1546 of a fever, possibly the plague.

==== Arnaut Mami ====
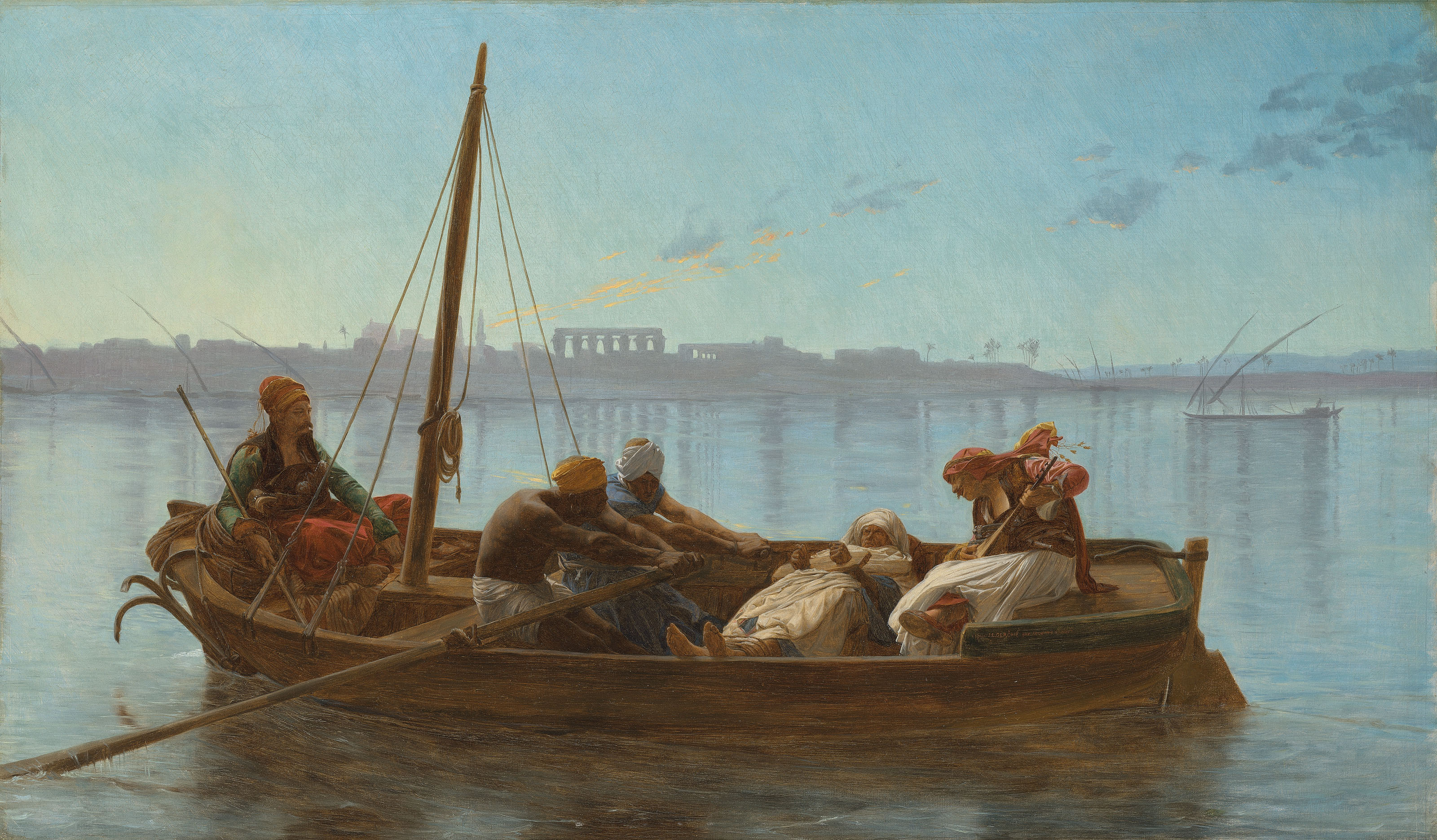
The Prisoner by Jean Lecomte du Nouÿ after Jean-Léon Gérôme, c.1871

Arnaut Mami was an Ottoman (of Albanian origin) renegade, the squadron admiral and the supreme commander of all Islamic vessels in North Africa and Pasha Algiers.

Leading a team of Ottoman vessels, on the morning of September 26, 1575, he attacked the Spanish galley "El Sol" in the Gulf of Lion, where Miguel de Cervantes was embarked from Naples. Despite an intrepid defense of the Spaniards, many of whom died in combat, the ship did not escape the corsairs and Cervantes was taken with other passengers to Algiers as captives. There, Cervantes became the slave of Arnaut Mami's second-in-command, Dali Mami. Cervantes was ransomed by his parents and the Trinitarians and returned to his family in Madrid after almost five years and four unsuccessful escape attempts. This period of his life influenced several of Cervante's literary works, notably the Captive's tale in Don Quixote and the two plays set in Algiers El trato de Argel (Life in Algiers) and Los baños de Argel (The Dungeons of Algiers).

== Links to North Africa ==
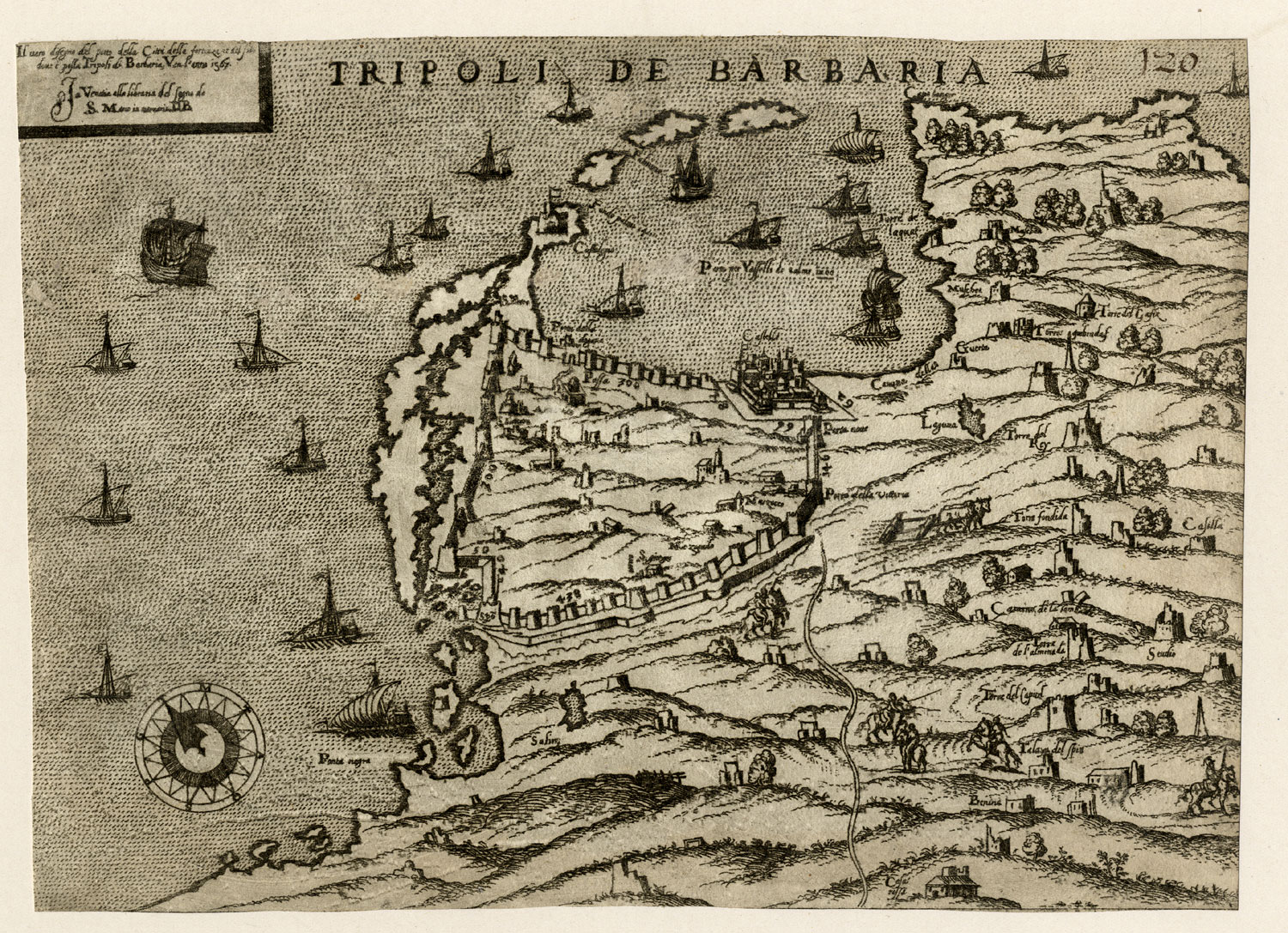
Map of Tripoli in 1561

Following a siege in Tripoli, several hardened pirates fled to Albania and joined the ranks of the Albanian pirates. Ali Hoxha was noted for burning down the village of Mljet in 1725. Following this incident, he was expelled from Ulcinj and returned to Tripoli. In 1731 a new pasha defeated the pirates once again, and many fled to Tripoli.

== Relations with local populations ==
Some pirate leaders maintained good relations with the local population. Hadji Alia earned the admiration of local peasants by generously sharing his loot, and became something of a legend after putting up fierce resistance to a powerful combined Venetian and British fleet, despite being significantly outmanned and outgunned.

== Legacy ==
Today there are numerous memorials in Ulcinj of the pirate lords who lived in the city. Haxhi Ali's fame among the Albanians led to naming one of the most important caves of the Albanian coast with his name.
