= Slavery in Albania =

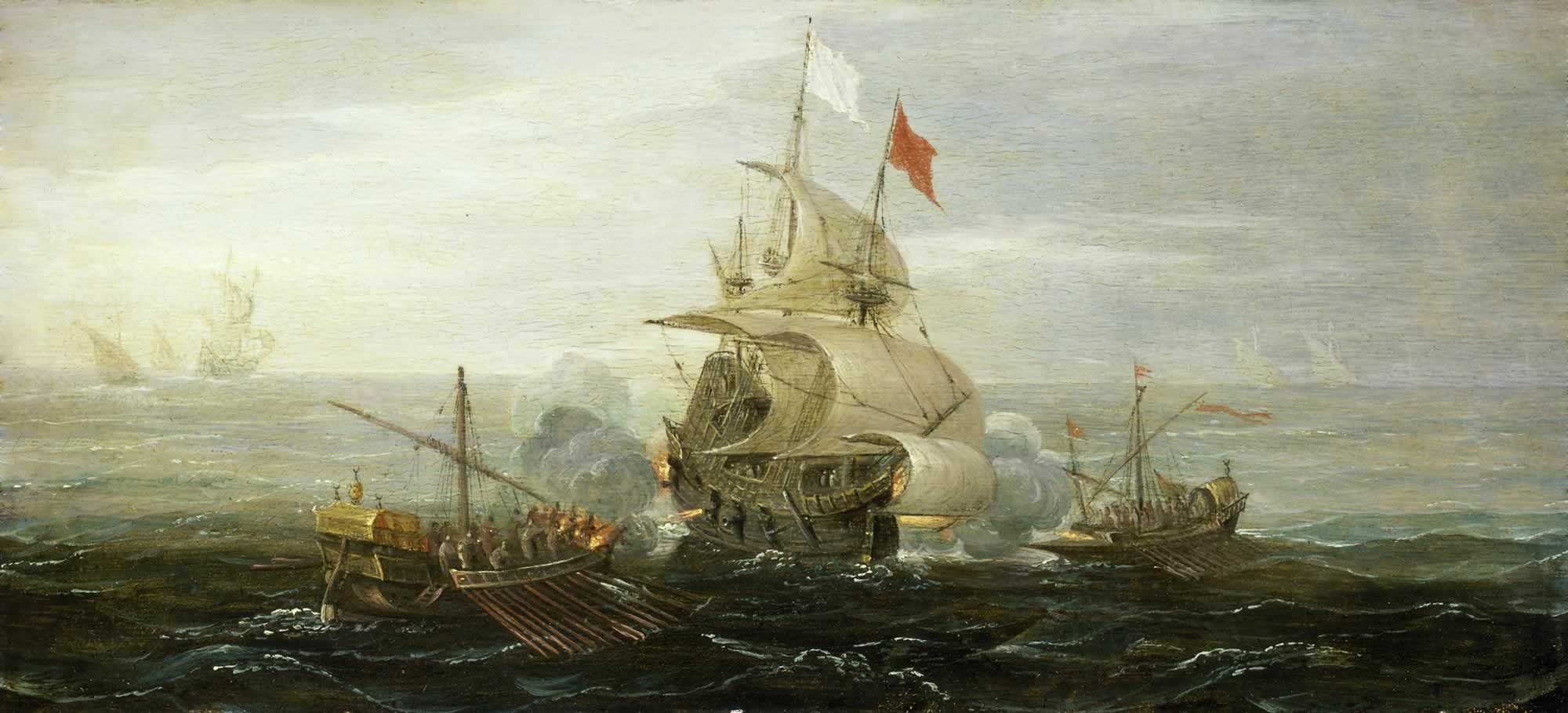
Pirates attacking a French ship. The Albanian piracy played an important part in slavery and slave trade in Ottoman Albania.

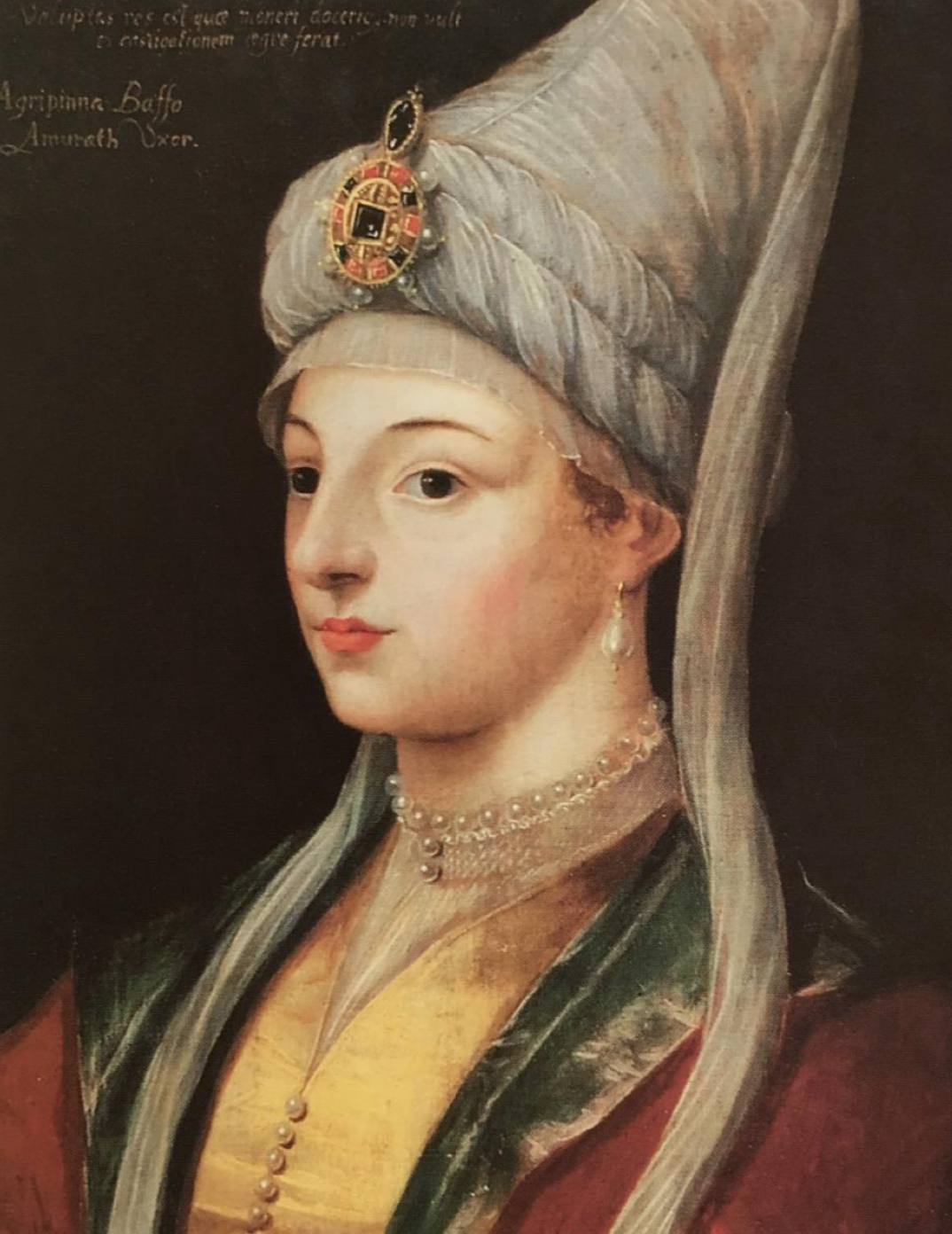
High version of ideal portrait of Safiye Sultan (mother of Mehmed III)

Slavery in Albania refer to the history of slavery in the area that was later to form the nation of Albania.

In Ancient Albania, the institution of slavery in the area was a part of the history of slavery in the Roman Empire. During the early middle ages, Albania was subjected to the laws of the Byzantine Empire, were slavery died out from the 10th century.

During the Ottoman conquest of the Balkans, Albania became a religious and political border zone between Christian Europe and the Islamic Ottoman Empire, and as a consequence the Albanians was termed as infidels kafir of Dar al-Harb and vulnerable to Ottoman slave raids and slave trading. During the Ottoman era, slavery was legal in accordance to Islamic law. As a non-Muslim province, Albania was also subjected to the blood tax of tributary slaves to the Ottoman Empire.

Albania also participated actively in the Ottoman slave trade via the Albanian piracy in the Adriatic Sea, where Albanian pirates captured ships coming largely from Christian states and enslaved the crew and passengers. These people remained enslaved in Albania and the rest of the Ottoman Empire until the 19th century. The Ottoman era in Albania ended in 1914, after which Ottoman law was no longer applicable.

== History ==
During the temure of Roman rule in Ancient Albania, slavery was regulated in accordance with the laws of slavery in the Roman Empire.

=== Byzantine rule ===
During the middle ages, the institution of slavery in Albania was regulated by the laws governing the institution of slavery in the Byzantine Empire. During the Byzantine campaign against the Pagan tribes on Balkan in the 10th century, slavery in the Byzantine Empire reached it maximum, when it was supplied by Pagan war captives.

While slavery in the Byzantine Empire was never formally abolished, it was gradually phased out in favor of serfdom by the landowners in the countryside, which eventually reduced slavery to become a marginal urban phenomena after the 10th century onward.

=== Ottoman Albania ===
During the time period when Albania was a province of the Ottoman Empire, the practice of slavery in Ottoman Albania (1385–1914) was governed by the Islamic law, that regulated the institution of slavery in the Ottoman Empire.

==== Slave trade ====
During the Ottoman era, slave trade in Albania was connected to the Albanian piracy which occurred from the 15th to the 19th centuries.

In January 1537, the Venetian ambassador in Istanbul, Tomasso Mocenigo, according to a letter from Suleiman I to the sandjakbey of Elbasan, had complained that privateer ships had attacked the Venetian territories and taken slaves who were sold in Durrës. In 1580, the pirates seized 25 ships at the bay of Kotor and the locals of Dubrovnik sent for help at the local pashas. In 1581, Ulcinj pirate lord Cafer Reis (Xhafer Reis) gathered 18 ships and robbed ships in the southern and central Adriatic forcing locals in the coastal towns to enforce their defences. The Ulcinj pirates became known as "Pulya and Sicilian whip". The locals of Kotor were mobilised by the Venetians who handed out rifles and gun powder to oppose the pirates. In the spring of 1587, the pirates robbed a frigate from Dubrovnik carrying 3,000 ducats to Carcass to buy wheat. The captain was killed and the crew wounded and sold as to slavery in the Ottoman Empire. Venetian studies at the time estimated that around 36% of all the cargo of the ships were damaged by the pirates. In 1637, the cities of Modon, Coron and Navarino demanded that the Ulcinj pirates release two Venetian slaves who had been captured during peace time.

In 1685, the Dulcignote pirates attacked Novigrad, numbering a population of 100, who were enslaved including the Venetian mayor. It is believed that Black slaves arrived in Ulcinj thanks to the Albanian pirates who traded with the Maghreb barbary pirates. Mehmet Pasha of Shkoder burned down the ship of Ulcinj pirate captain Ajdar Piri in the city port in front to the inhabitants.

On June 22, 1717, the Dulcignotti landed in Aridonniche and spread to the surrounding plains. In the Lice building there was a German garrison made up of a lieutenant and 26 men on horseback who rushed to face them and routed them, killing 15 and wounding many. Only two of the German soldiers died. On May 12, 1719, a Genoese tartana led by Padron Andrea Gorgone, loaded with 2300 tomoli of wheat, was attacked under the Vecchia tower by the Dulcignotti. The sailors, to escape life and slavery, rushed into the sea and took refuge in the nearby tower. An Italian study of the history of Rovinj from 2010 mentions the writings of a Paolo Paulovich who in turn mentioned the canon Constantini who in 1733 founded the "Confraternity for the liberation of slaves" with the goal of freeing the crews of Rovinj that "fell miserably into the hands of pirate ships of the Dulcignottes".

On December 9, 1772, Joseph-Dimitri Gaspary, French consul in Athens, sent a letter to the French minister mentioning that a fleet of 30 ships from Dulcigné (Ulcinj) was destroyed by the Russians in the Gulf of Patras. Prior to this, four Dulcignote ships had enslaved 15 German and French soldiers from the island of Corfu and sold them to Salone. One of them, Joseph Vichel, from Alsace, escaped to the building of Captain Blanc of La Ciotat.

==== Slavery ====
Ottoman Albania was subjected to Ottoman law. Slavery in the Ottoman Empire was regulated by the Seriat, the religious Islamic Law, and by the secular Sultan's law Kanun, which was essentially supplementary regulations to facilitate the implementation of the Seriat law. The Islamic law regarding Islamic views on slavery legitimized enslavement by purchase of already enslaved people from middleman slave traders; by children born from two enslaved parents or from a slave mother without an acknowledged father; or by enslaving war captives, specifically kafir of Dar al-Harb, that is non-Muslims from non-Muslim lands, with whom Muslims of Dar al-Islam (the Muslim world) were by definition always in a state of war. A Muslim man was by law entitled to have sexual intercourse with his female slave (concubinage in Islam) without this being defined as extramarital sex (zina); if he chose to acknowledge paternity of a child with her the child would become free, and his mother would become umm walad and manumitted on the death of her enslaver; but if he did not acknowledge paternity both the child and mother would remain slaves, continuing the line of slavery.

As in other non-Muslim Ottoman provinces in the Balkans, Albania was subjected to the blood tax of slave children known as the Devshirme system. The system had been introduced by Murad II, and was imposed upon the Christian provinces of the Balkans when the Ottomans felt a need to increase their slave supply of Palace state slaves or slave soldier (janissaries). When the Ottomans needed to increase their slave supply, Ottoman officials travelled to Christian villages, demanded a list from the village priest of the baptised boys of the village, and selected one son from each family: boys that were healthy, intelligent, uncircumcised and beautiful were prioritized for selection. There are claims of very poor families who villingly offered their children, but in general, Christian families tried to avoid having their children taken as slaves. Boys taken during this system were subjected to a long training during which they became Islamicized and fostered to loyalty to the Sultan. The official Devshirme system was however not the only way in which non-Muslims could be enslaved in the province. Ottoman governors and officials are known to have supplied the Ottoman slave market also with non-Muslim slave girls. Ballaban Badera and Safiye Sultan (mother of Mehmed III) were reportedy among the most known examples of the people enslaved from Albania.

Chattel slavery remained legal in the Ottoman Empire, and consequently legal in Albania, until the end of Ottoman rule and the formation of the Principality of Albania in 1914. It was however subjected to changes during the end of Ottoman rule, such as the Kanunname of 1889, which was introduced to restrict slavery due to diplomatic pressure.

== See also ==
- Balkan slave trade
- Venetian slave trade
