= Ceni (surname) =

Ceni is a surname. Notable people with the surname include:

- Lika Ceni (1749–?), Albanian pirate leader
- Rogério Ceni (born 1973), Brazilian football coach and former player
