= CENI =

CENI is an abbreviation for Commission Électorale Nationale Indépendante, and may refer to:

- Independent National Electoral Commission (Democratic Republic of the Congo)
- Independent National Electoral Commission (Guinea)
- National Independent Election Commission (Mauritania)

== See also ==
- Ceni (disambiguation)
