= Doda =

Doda may refer to:

== Places ==
- Doda, Jammu and Kashmir, a town and a notified area committee in India
  - Doda Assembly constituency
- Doda district, in Jammu and Kashmir, India
- Doda River, also known as the Stod River, in Jammu and Kashmir, India
- Doda, Punjab, a settlement in Punjab, India
- Doda Lake, Quebec, Canada
- Doda Dome, a granite dome in Yosemite National Park, California, United States

== People ==
- Doda (surname), including a list of people with this name
- Doda of Reims (before 509–?), French saint
- Doda (c. 584–?), wife of Arnulf of Metz (c. 582–c. 645), Frankish saint, bishop of Metz and advisor to the Merovingian court of Austrasia
- Doda Conrad (1905–1997), Polish-born American operatic singer
- Álvaro de Miranda Neto, known as Doda Miranda, Brazilian show jumper
- Doda (singer), Polish musician Dorota Rabczewska-Stępień (born 1984)

== Other uses ==
- Doda (drug), an opioid made from poppy husks
- Doda Bodonawieedo, a Star Wars character

== See also ==
- Dhoda (disambiguation)
