= Lika Ceni =

18th-century Barbary pirate

- Born: 1749; Ulcinj, Sanjak of Scutari, Ottoman Empire (modern day Montenegro)
- Other names: Ali Kaceni, Ali Kapidani, Likacen-Lazoja
- Occupation: Pirate

Lika Ceni (born 1749, Ulqin) known as Kapidan Likaceni, was a pirate leader from the Ottoman Empire.

Lika Ceni was a legendary Albanian pirate from Ulcinj. He reportedly was one of a number of Barbary corsairs who helped seize the port from Venice and stayed on raiding Venetian and other merchant ships along the Dalmatian coast.

His legend has also become synonymous with the famous Lambros Katsonis (1752-1804); a Greek naval admiral of the 18th century (born in Levadia, he joined the Orlov Revolt in 1770). As captain of the Greek fleet against the Ottoman Empire he had become a thorn in the side of the Sultan. Greeks called him Katsonis, the Italians called Lambro Cazziani, Cazzoni. Ali Kaceni, the name that history remembers him by, is said to be a derivative of Katsonis. As he was attributed with defeating Lambros, thus earning his name of Ali Kaceni; Ali, the one who slew Labro Katsonis, which is in fact exaggeration as Greek commander was defeated, but not killed. In the legend of Lambros, it said that he died in battle with the Turks in Crimea; which culminates to the legend we know about Likaceni. Due to Karalambro (Black Lambro) deeds and actions against the Ottomans, the Sultan was forced to eliminate this foe. For this act, Likaceni accepted the bounty made by the Sultan; with a reward of an official title for the one could defeat Lambro Katsonis. The legend says that Likaceni defeated Karalambro, thus given the title "Kapidan". Due to Likaceni's actions and activities in the Adriatic and Mediterranean; , many Ottoman pashas and captains of the Ottoman fleet convinced the Sultan that this Albanian was a massive threat and ordered his death as well. Upon being detained in the Bosphorus, Likaceni was able to slip through an Ottoman blockade and return to his home of Ulcinj.

His direct-descendents still allegedly survive today in Ulcinj under the surnames Lazoja and Kapidani.

== See also ==
- Albanian piracy
