= Anton Doda =

Albanian vice consul

Anton Duoda
- Born: c. 1680; Shkodër
- Died: 24 November 1766; Shkodër
- Citizenship: Venetian
- Education: dragoman
- Occupations: Translator, merchant and diplomat
- Years active: c. 1700–1766
- Employer(s): Venice and the Ottoman Empire
- Known for: Maintaining trade relations between Venice and the Ottoman Empire
- Spouse: Marija Borci
- Family: Doda family, part of Hani e Tushi

Anton Duoda (Italian: Antonio Duodo) (German: Antonios Duoda) (c. 1680, Shkodër – died November 24, 1766) was an Albanian vice consul and merchant from Shkodër between 1706 and 1756 working for Venice. He was married to Marija Borci. Doda derived from the family today part of Tushi and Shani. In 1734, he writes that Kurt Mahmut Pasha, bey of Shkodër, traveled to his home city Gjakova. According to the Albanian newspaper Leka from 1933, in July 1733, Doda warned that the Pasha of Shkodër was planning on launching an attack on Montenegro. He sent the news to Zorzi Grimani, the General of Dalmatia. In 1735, Anton Doda thanked secretary Cromwell for the position of vice consul of Venice. In 1736, Doda writes that Shkodër has 1000 shops in the market. At the beginning of the 17th century, Doda built his house in Tophane close to the Venetian embassy in Shkodërr. In 1747 Doda practiced the system of leasing contracts for ships travelling to Venice from Ulcinj due to the fear of pirates. In 1755, Doda writes to the Venetians of Moro that an army was grazing in Catarro (Kotor) forcing Catholic Albanians to emigrate to the Ottoman Empire. He also writes about the pirates from Ulcinj in Tripoli where he states that ”no one even dares visiting the barber”. According to Doda, ”the war between the Begolli family of Peja and the Pashaliks of Gjakova had disrupted the economy of Shkodër”. Doda was fluent in Albanian, Italian, Latin, Slavic and Ottoman. According to Doda, in 1758, March 18, the border of Albania ended in Nis. He died on November 24, 1766.

In 1771, Duoda was criticized in a German publication by Johann Friedrich Le Breto (1732-1807) who accused Duoda for serving the consul Cumano in Durrës and for having given himself the title of consul.

A certain member of the family was Tush Duoda Kapiteni and his portrait was painted in 1844 by a certain E. Kaizer, which was photographed by Kel Maurbi on Januar 14, 1934 which can be found in the archives of the Marubi collection.
