= Arnaut Mami =

16th-century Ottoman corsair

- Allegiance: Ottoman Empire
- Branch: Ottoman Navy

Arnaut Mami or Mahomed the Albanian (fl. 1572–76) was an Ottoman Albanian commander and admiral of the Ottoman fleet and the squadron admiral and the supreme commander of all Islamic vessels in North Africa and Pasha Algiers, known as the most formidable corsair of that period for his terrorizing of the narrow seas. He was also captain general of Ottoman galleys in Algiers. He was called Arnaut after his Albanian origin.

On the morning of 26 September 1575, Arnaut's ship attacked the galley Sol on the Catalan coast, with Miguel de Cervantes aboard. After significant resistance, in which the captain and many crew members were killed, the surviving passengers were taken to Algiers as captives. After five years as a slave, Cervantes was released when his family paid the ransom.

== See also ==
- Albanian piracy
