= Dhoda, Kohat =

Dhoda
- Union Council
- Country: Pakistan
- Province: Khyber Pakhtunkhwa
- District: Kohat

Population (2022)
  - Estimate: 35,000
- Time zone: UTC+5 (PST)

Dhoda is a union council of Kohat District in the Khyber Pakhtunkhwa province of Pakistan. It is located 13 km from Kohat city bazar and 4 km from national highway.

District Kohat has 2 Tehsils i.e. Kohat and Lachi. Each Tehsil comprises certain numbers of Union council. There are 27 union councils in district Kohat.

== See also ==
- Kohat District
