= Dhodha =

Observance of Dusshera in Nepal

Navaratri
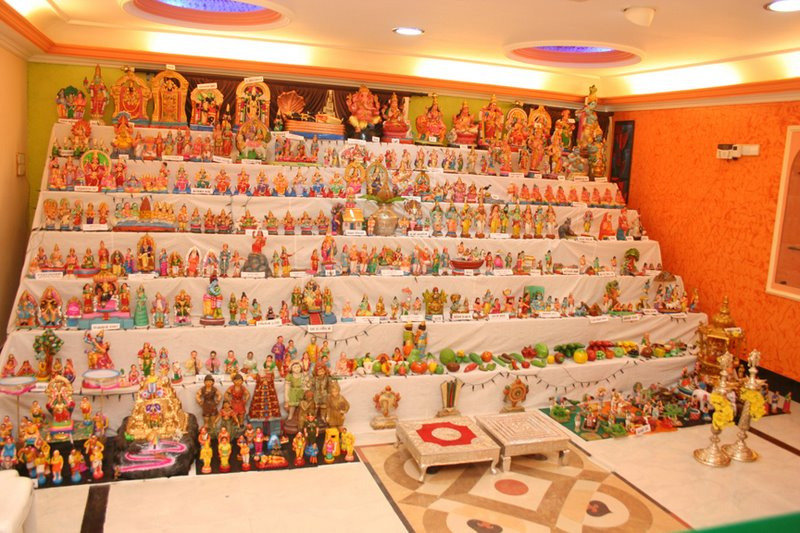
- Dhodha navratri depicting various forms of Hindu deities worshiped for 9 days and in 10th day in is dashera
- Observed by: Hinduism
- Type: Hindu
- Celebrations: 9-10 days
- Observances: Major [Hindu] Festival
- Begins: September/October
- Ends: October/November
- Date: Usually September–November. The date changes as per lunar calendar.

Dhodha is a festival in Navratri dedicated to the worship of Hindu saurastra deity Shakti. The word dhodha is song. the is savrastrian trik or tretli. During these nine nights and ten days, nine forms of Shakti/Devi are worshipped. The 10th day is commonly referred to as Vijayadashami or "Dussehra."
